= Jewish Cemetery, Chinchpokli =

Chinchpokli Jewish cemetery

Coordinates: 18.9753241°N 72.8380539°E

Jewish Cemetery, Chinchpokli, is a cemetery in Chinchpokli, Bombay, laid out near the Chinchpokli railway station by Elias David Sassoon in 1878. Covering two acres, the burial ground now contains more than a thousand graves, and new burials continue to take place.

== History ==
Elias David Sassoon, a leading Bombay merchant and banker, created the cemetery in January 1878 in memory of his son Joseph, who had died at Shanghai in 1868. It was originally intended for Sephardic Baghdadi Jews.

The cemetery has declined since the days when there was a large community of Jews in Bombay, with numbers falling during the second half of the 20th century from around 7,000 to only a small fraction of that.

== Mausoleums ==
Two large mausoleums of very similar design contain the remains of Sir Jacob Sassoon (1844–1916) and his wife, Rachel Sassoon. A third mausoleum is that of Sir Albert Abdullah David Sassoon, 1st Baronet (1818–1896), who in the event was buried in England.

== Notable monuments ==
The first Miss India, Esther Victoria Abraham (1916–2006), also an actress and film producer, is mentioned on the monument to the Abraham family. There are plaques to the memory of Otto Mass, who was murdered in Buchenwald, and Ernst Mass, who was murdered in Auschwitz-Birkenau.

== 21st century ==
In 2014, the cemetery was reported to be "overrun with weeds" and still used largely by the small Baghdadi Jewish community, said to number just over a hundred. While some Israelis were also being buried, they were usually ones related to the Baghdadi Jews.

== See also ==
- Sassoon family
