= Victor Sassoon =

British businessman and hotelier (1881–1961)

Sir Victor Sassoon Bt GBE
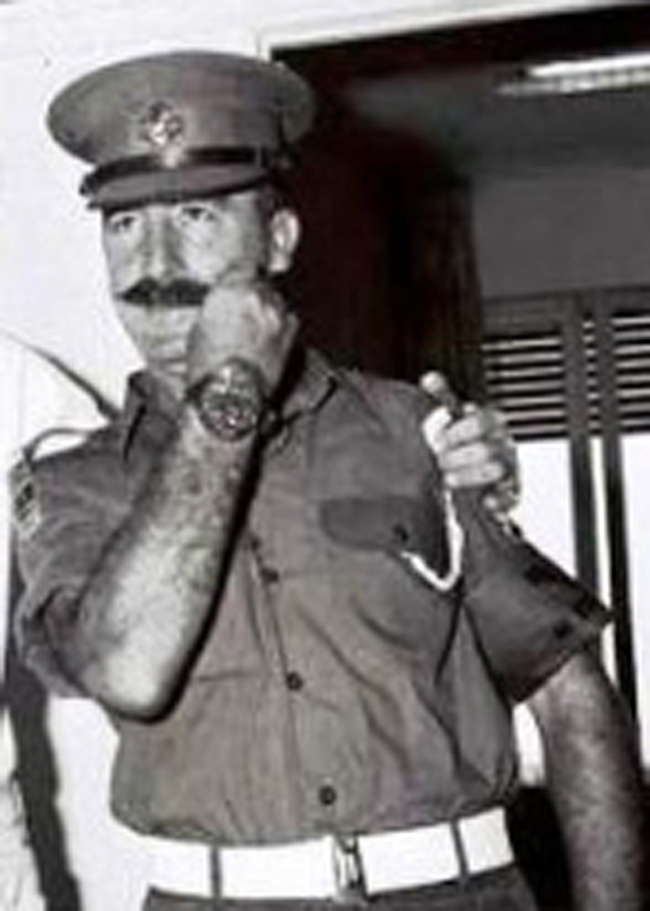
- Born: 20 December 1881; Naples, Kingdom of Italy
- Died: 13 August 1961 (aged 79); Nassau, The Bahamas
- Education: Trinity College, Cambridge
- Occupations: Businessman; hotelier
- Family: Sassoon family

Sir Ellice Victor Sassoon, 3rd Baronet GBE (20 December 1881 – 13 August 1961) was a British businessman and hotelier from the wealthy Baghdadi Jewish Sassoon merchant and banking family.

== Biography ==
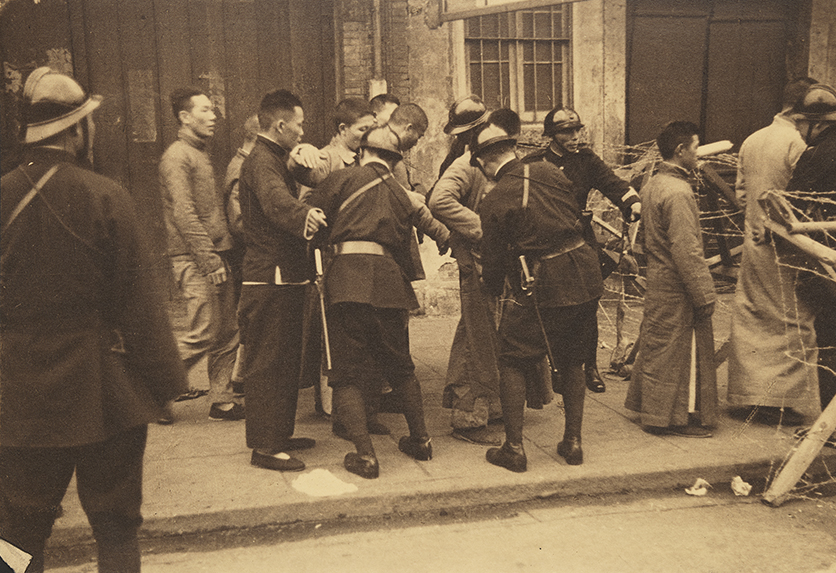
Chinese Civilians with Japanese Soldiers at Checkpoint (1937), a photograph by Victor Sassoon taken in Shanghai during the Second Sino-Japanese War.

Ellice Victor Elias Sassoon was born 20 (some sources cite 30) December 1881 in Naples, Kingdom of Italy. He was born to the Baghdadi Jewish Sassoon family, which dealt successfully in commodities including precious metals, silks, gums, spices, wool and wheat. Later, the firm specialised in trading Indian cotton yarn and opium from Bombay to China.

Sassoon lived in Shanghai as a "wealthy bon vivant who worked tirelessly to protect Western interests in the Orient" and helped European Jews survive in the Shanghai Ghetto. Sir Victor walked with the aid of two sticks as the result of injuries in World War I in which he served in the Royal Flying Corps. He founded the Cathay Hotel (now the Peace Hotel) but left under increasing Japanese pressure in 1941.

Sassoon loved photography and opened a studio in Shimla first called Hamilton Studios. In 1928 he established his hobby and opened a studio in Bombay State at Ballard Estate by the same name as Hamilton Studios at E.D.Sassoon Building (one of his property), Ballard Estate, and all the negatives from Shimla were brought here, to Bombay, closing down that studio completely. He was also fond of horse racing and Chinese ivories (his vast collection was eventually bequeathed to the British Museum in 2018).

During the 1950s, Sassoon lived at his home on Cable Beach in Nassau. He also spent time in the remote town of Hillsboro, New Mexico, located about a three-hour drive north of El Paso, Texas. He built a house there and named it El Refugio. It has since been turned into a bed and breakfast.

Late in life he married his American nurse, Evelyn "Barnsie" Barnes, who remained in Nassau long after Sassoon's death in 1961. Lady Sassoon continued to provide support for the charity founded by her late husband to help Bahamian children, by hosting the black-tie Heart Ball each year over the Valentine's Day weekend.

== E. D. Sassoon & Co. ==
On the death of his father in 1924, Sassoon inherited the trading house "E.D. Sassoon & Co. Limited". "E.D. Sassoon Banking Company Limited", a subsidiary in Hong Kong formed in 1928, was bought by the merchant bank "Wallace Brothers and Company (Holding)" in 1972, which in turn was taken over by the Standard Chartered Bank in 1976. The other parts of the "Sassoon Group" and the "Sir Victor Sassoon Heart Foundation", created by Lady Sassoon after Sassoon's death, are run from Nassau.

== Woodditton Stud ==
A fan of thoroughbred horse racing, Sassoon owned a highly successful stable of horses that won numerous prestigious races in the United Kingdom. In 1925, he purchased the Bungalow Stud, founded 1851 in Cambridgeshire not far from the Newmarket Racecourse. He renamed it Eve Stud Ltd. as he was known to his intimates as 'Eve' - a contraction of his first two names, Ellice Victor. Sir Noel Murless purchased the property from Sassoon's widow in 1970 and gave it the name Woodditton Stud. Today, it is owned by Darley Stud Management.

Sassoon purchased Beech House Stud from Martin H. Benson in 1960 and along with Eve Stud it became part of Sassoon Studs Incorporated managed by Murless. Sassoon's wife sold the Sassoon Studs to Louis Freedman in 1971.

Among Sassoon's stables' significant performances were wins in The Derby (Pinza, Crepello, Hard Ridden, St. Paddy), Epsom Oaks (Exhibitionnist), 1,000 Guineas (Exhibitionnist, Honeylight), 2,000 Guineas (Crepello), St. Leger Stakes (St Paddy) and King George VI and Queen Elizabeth Stakes (Pinza).

== Family ==
On the death of his father, Sir Edward Elias Sassoon, in 1924, Victor Sassoon became the 3rd Baronet of Bombay. Late in life, in 1959, he married his American nurse, Evelyn Barnes ("Barnsie"). He had no issue and the baronetcy became extinct.

He was related by marriage to the Mocatta family and he himself was a Sephardic Jew. One of his former employees, Lawrence Kadoorie (later the Lord Kadoorie), later founded the Hong Kong-based utility company China Light and Power. One of his right-hand men in Shanghai was Gordon Currie who was put into a concentration camp by the Japanese and remained there for several years.

== Honours and awards ==
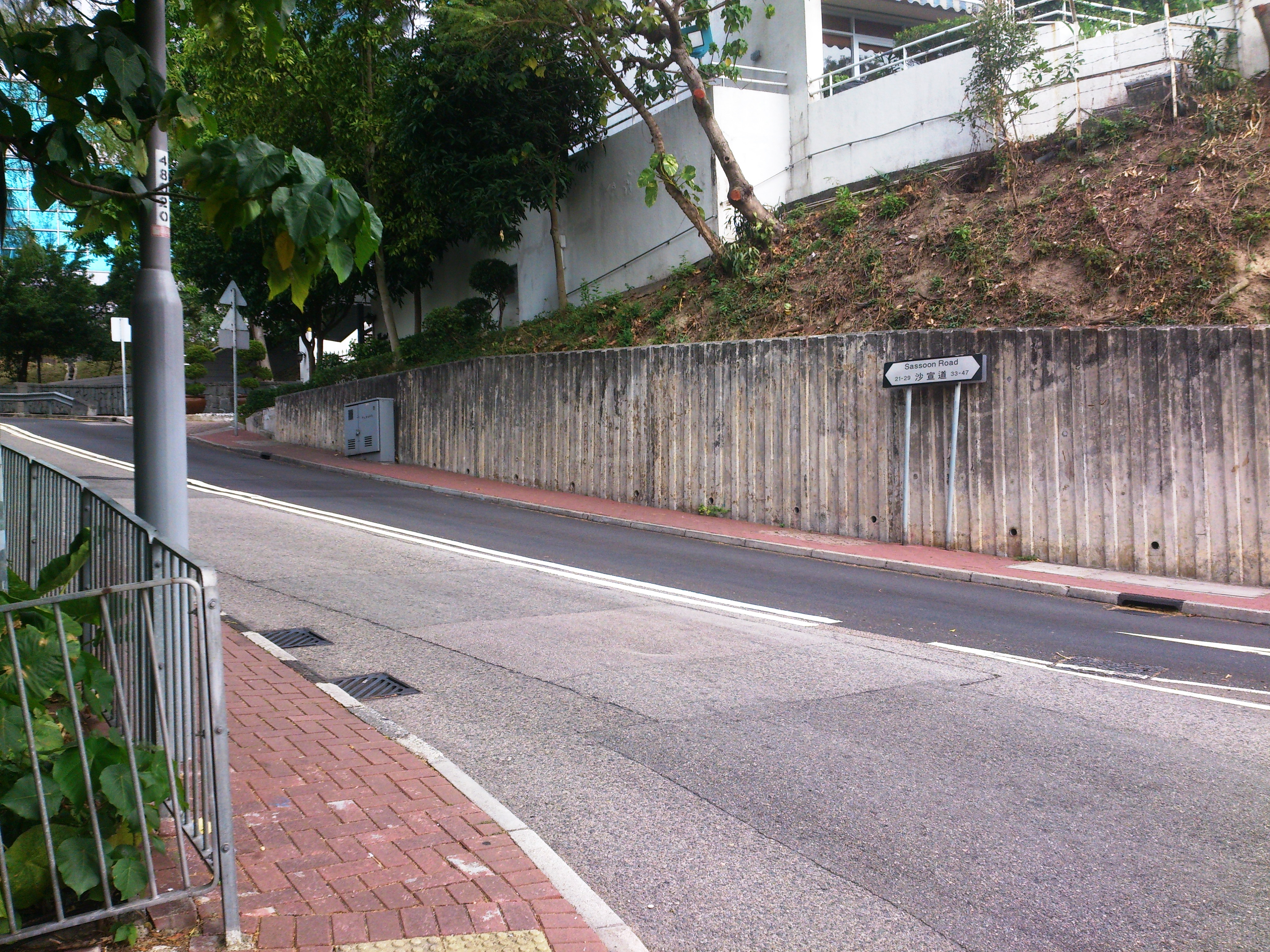
Sassoon Road in Pok Fu Lam

- Knight Grand Cross of the Order of the British Empire, dated 1 January 1947
- Sassoon Road (沙宣道) in Pok Fu Lam, a residential area on Hong Kong Island in Hong Kong, is named in his honour
- On 11 February 2011, the Bahamas Postal Service issued four commemorative postage stamps to highlight the 50th anniversary of the Victor Sassoon Heart Foundation. One of them portrays Sir Victor Sassoon.

== See also ==
- Sassoon family
- David Sassoon & Co.

Baronetage of the United Kingdom
Preceded by Edward Elias Sassoon	Baronet (of Bombay); 1924–1961	Extinct
