= Elias David Sassoon =

Indian merchant of Baghdadi Jewish origin (1820–1880)

- אליהו דוד ששון
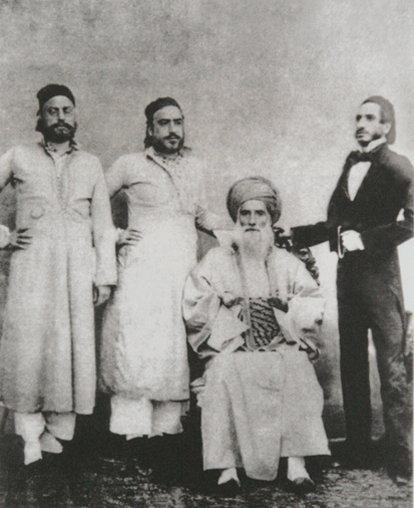
- David Sassoon (seated) and sons, including Elias David Sassoon (left)
- Born: 27 March 1820; Baghdad, Baghdad Eyalet, Ottoman Iraq
- Died: 21 March 1880 (aged 59); Galle, British Ceylon
- Resting place: Bombay
- Occupation: Merchant
- Spouse: Leah Gubbay
- Children: 6
- Father: David Sassoon
- Relatives: Sassoon family

Elias David Sassoon (27 March 1820 – 21 March 1880) was an Indian Baghdadi Jewish merchant. He was the son of David Sassoon and a member of the Sassoon family. Sassoon earned an immense fortune alongside his family and he was the founder of E. D. Sassoon & Co., a trading company he founded in 1867.

== Early life and background ==
Born in Baghdad, Ottoman Iraq, into a Baghdadi Jewish family, Sassoon was the second son of David Sassoon and a member of the Sassoon family. His father, David, was an Iraqi Baghdadi Jewish merchant and trader who fled with his family from Baghdad to Bombay, India, in 1832, and later began trading in textiles. Sassoon was one of 14 siblings.

== Career ==
In 1832, Sassoon's father, David, founded David Sassoon and Sons, which later became David Sassoon & Co., a trading company. After the First Opium War, which ended in 1842, Sassoon, at the age of 24, was sent by his father, David, to China to seek new opportunities for their family’s trading business.

In 1844, Sassoon arrived in Guangzhou, known then as Canton, and in 1845, he moved to Shanghai after recognizing that the best business opportunities were in Shanghai. Sassoon was instrumental in his family businesses' growth in China. In the 1850s, Sassoon and his older brother, Albert, became partners in David Sassoon & Co., with their father. Sassoon expanded the Sassoon family's businesses in China and eventually, the family's trading fleet carried around one-fifth of the total opium imported into China. The Sassoon businesses would sell opium and British textiles in China in exchange for silk, tea and silver.

In 1867, Sassoon separated from his family company and established his own company, named E. D. Sassoon & Co., as a result of a feud with his brother Albert. The feud arose from resentment over Albert's appointment as head of the family and being placed in charge of the family businesses after the death of their father, David, in 1864. Sassoon also made it a business policy that his company, E. D. Sassoon & Co., would directly compete with David Sassoon & Co. in every area and tradable product. After establishing E. D. Sassoon & Co., he would import cloth from Britain and sell it to luxury stores in Shanghai that catered to wealthy European settlers in the city.

== Personal life and death ==
Sassoon was married to Leah Gubbay. They were parents to 6 children, including Jacob, Edward, Joseph, and Hannah. In 1878, Sassoon established the Jewish Cemetery, Chinchpokli in memory of his son Joseph, who had died in Shanghai in 1868. His daughter Hannah married Sassoon David. He died in 1880 in British Ceylon. Sassoon's sons built the Keneseth Eliyahoo Synagogue in Mumbai, which was completed in 1884, in memory of Sassoon. After his death, E. D. Sassoon & Co. was led by his son, Jacob Sassoon. In 1909, his son, Jacob, became the 1st Baronet of Bombay in the Baronetage of the United Kingdom. Jacob funded the Jacob Sasson Hospital for Europeans at Poona which opened in 1909.

== See also ==
- Sassoon family
- David Sassoon & Co.
- E.D. Sassoon & Co.
- Victor Sassoon
- Ohel Leah Synagogue, Hong Kong was named after his wife Leah, founded with donations from Jacob's brothers.
