= Sir Edward Sassoon, 2nd Baronet =

Sir Edward Sassoon, 2nd Baronet may refer to:

- Sir Edward Sassoon, 2nd Baronet, of Kensington Gore, British businessman and politician
- Sir Edward Elias Sassoon, 2nd Baronet
