= Chinchpokli =

Coordinates: 18°59′N 72°50′E

- Neighbourhood
- Location within Mumbai
- Country: India
- State: Maharashtra
- District: Mumbai City
- City: Mumbai

Government
  - Type: Municipal Corporation
  - Body: Brihanmumbai Municipal Corporation (MCGM)

Languages
  - Official: Marathi
- Time zone: UTC+5:30 (IST)
- PIN: 400011
- Area code: 022
- Civic agency: BMC

Chinchpokli (Marathi: चिंचपोकळी) is a neighbourhood in South Mumbai. It is also the name of a railway station on the Central line of the Mumbai suburban railway. Historical British era spellings include Chinchpugli and Chinchpooghly. The neighbourhood is named after the Marathi words for tamarind (chinch) and betel nut (pofali).

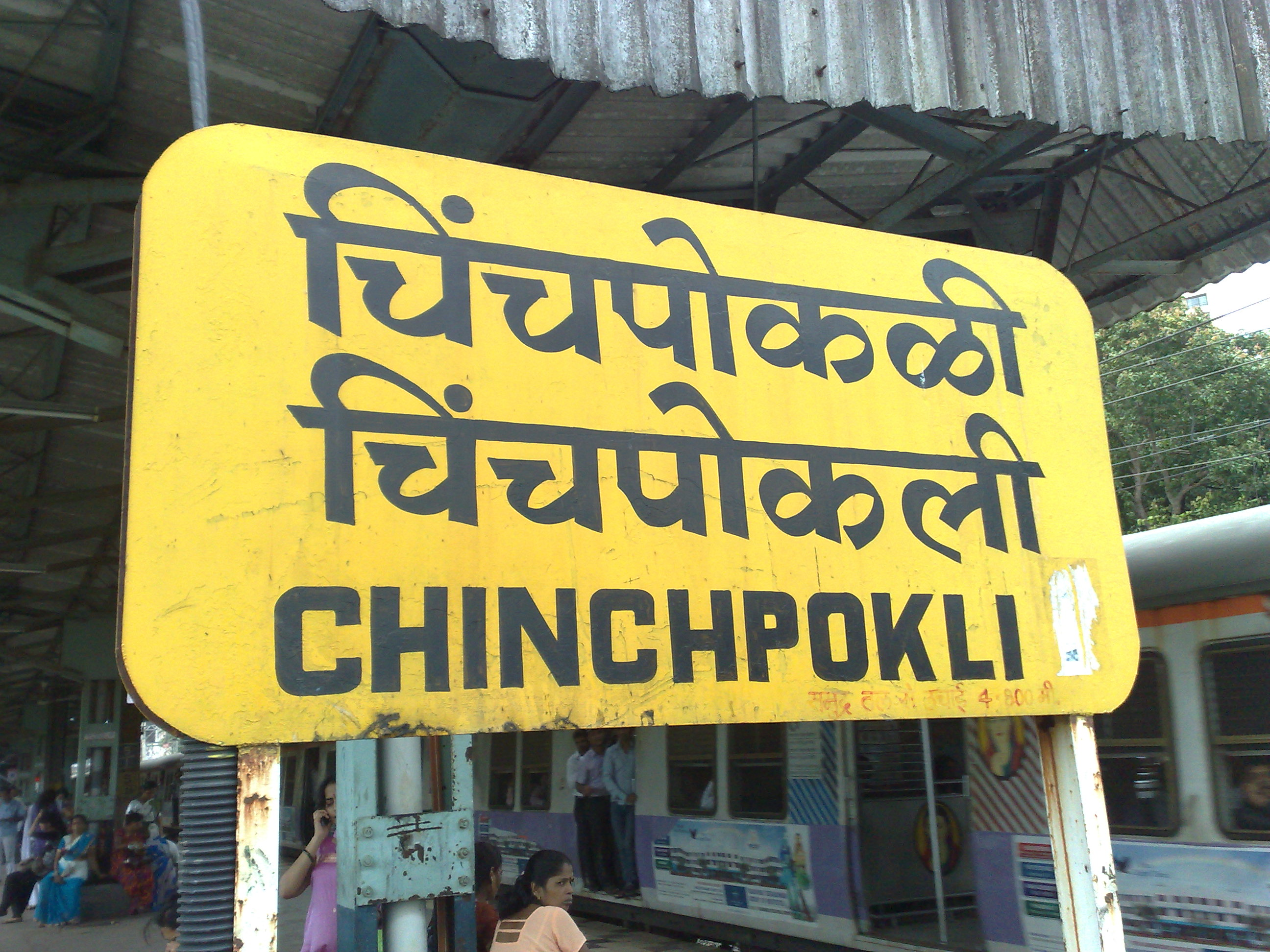
Chinchpokli stationboard

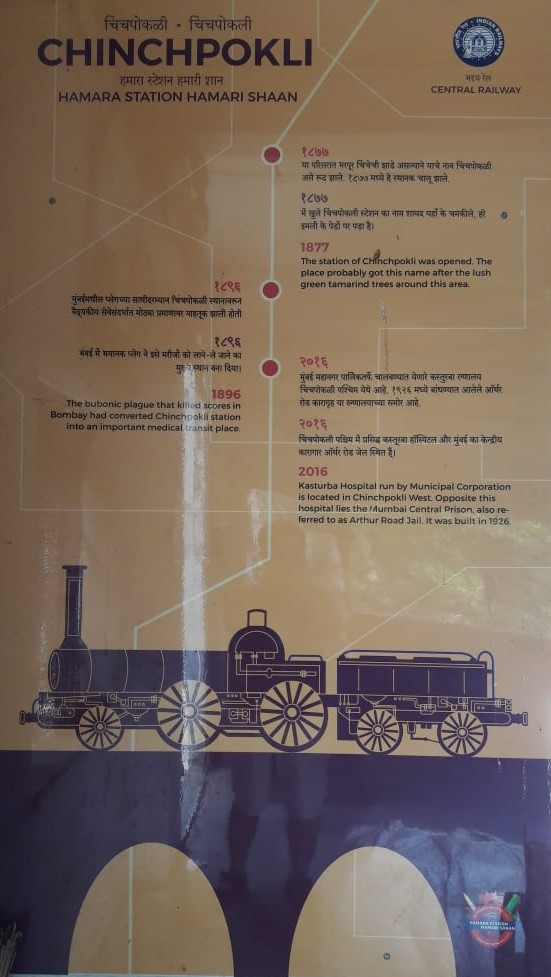
Chinchpokli station Banner

== History ==
The Chinchpokli Railway station was opened on 9 December 1867. There is a Jewish Cemetery, laid out by Elias David Sassoon in 1878, which lies parallel to the railway tracks. In 1896, during the Bombay plague epidemic, the Chinchpokli Station was converted into medical transit place. The Road bridge over the railway track, known as Arthur Bridge was built in 1915. Kasturba Hospital run by Municipal Corporation is located in Chinchpokli West. Opposite to this hospital lies the Mumbai Central Prison, also referred to as Arthur Road Jail. It was built in 1926.
