= E. D. Sassoon & Co. =

Former trading company

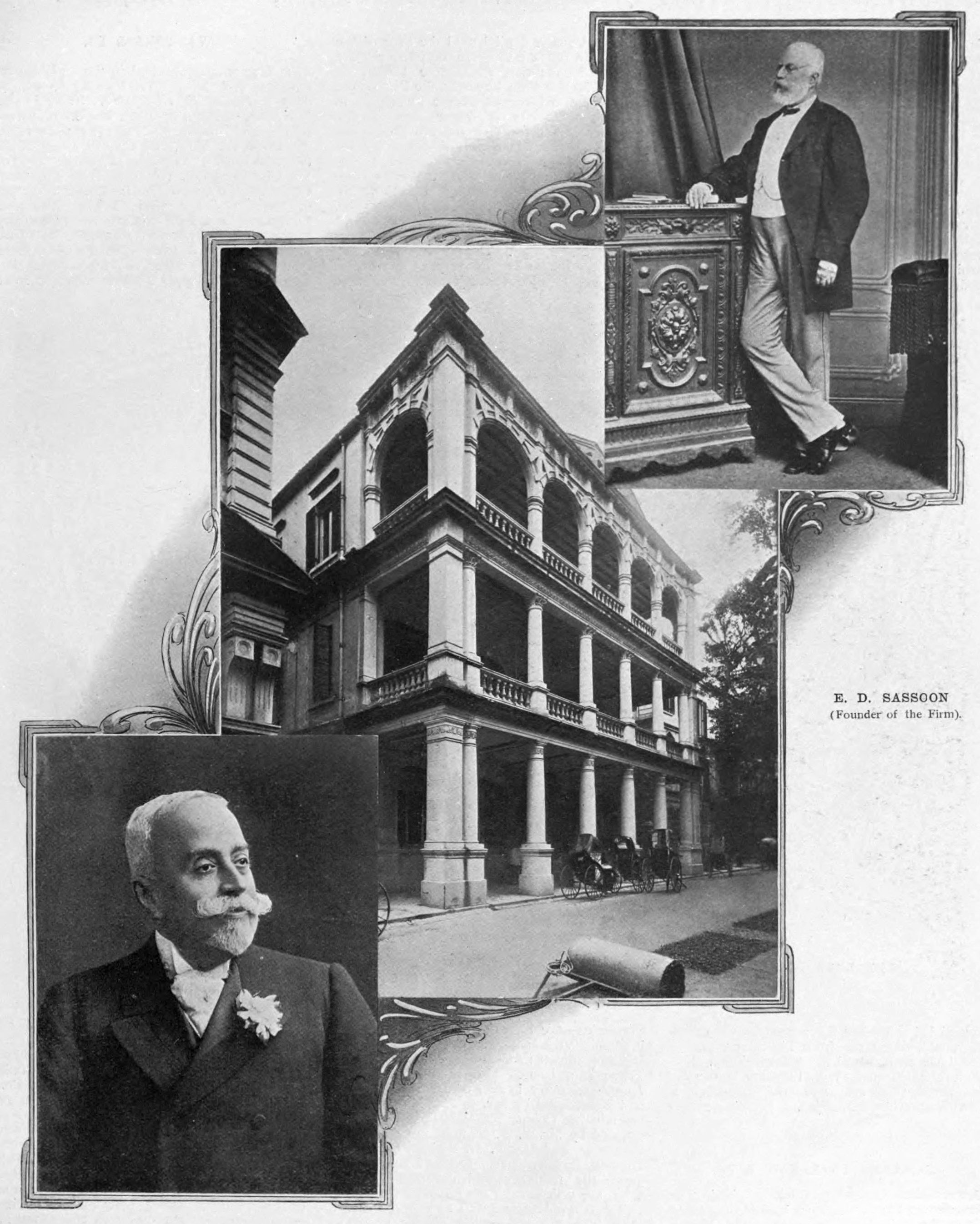
Elias David Sassoon (top), offices of E.D. Sassoon & Co. in Bombay (middle) and Jacob Sassoon (bottom)

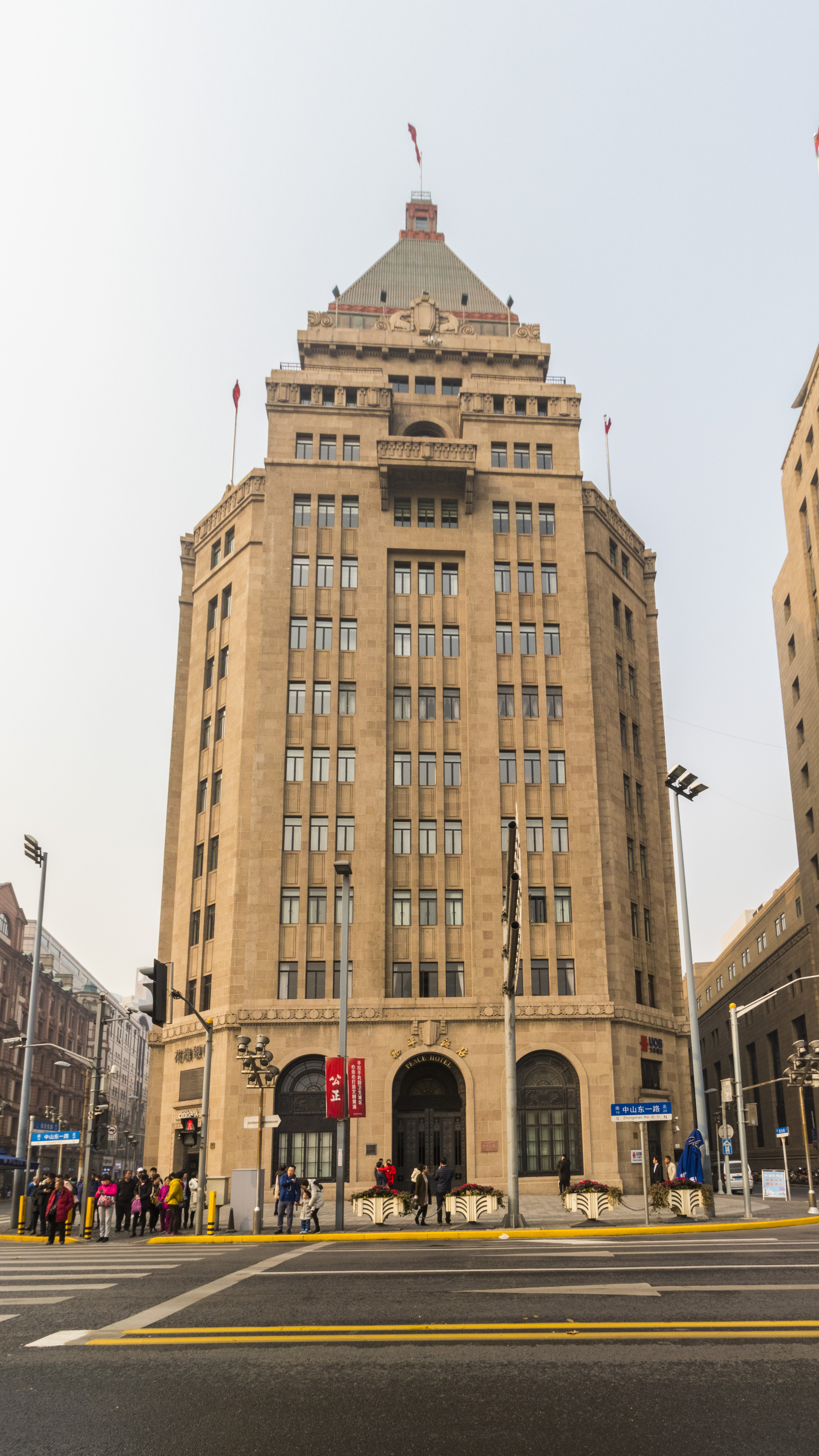
Former "Sassoon House", today "Peace Hotel″

E.D. Sassoon & Co., Ltd. was a trading company operating in the second half of the 19th century and the first half of the 20th century predominantly in India, China and Japan.

== History ==
E.D. Sassoon & Co., Ltd. was founded in 1867 by Elias David Sassoon (1820–1880), the second son of David Sassoon (1792–1864), after he had broken away from his family's company, David Sassoon & Co., because of personal resentments between him and his brothers. The new company started to trade in dried fruits, namkeen, metals, tea, silk, spices, and camphor from modest offices in Bombay and Shanghai. But it soon focused on exporting opium, cotton and fabrics from India to China.

E.D. Sassoon & Co. soon proved to be more energetic than David Sassoon & Co. and by the later Edwardian years its capital was two to three times as much (£1.25m to £1.5m) as the nominal capital of David Sassoon & Co. (£0.5m). The company later expanded its operations to the Persian Gulf ports, Baghdad and Japan. From 1879 onwards it also bought up poorly performing cotton mills in Bombay and turned them into successful operations.

After the death of Elias David Sassoon in 1880, his eldest son Sir Jacob Elias Sassoon (1844–1916) took over the business and further branches were opened in Calcutta and Karachi. The firm also purchased property in Shanghai. But in 1907 the United Kingdom signed a treaty agreeing to gradually eliminate the opium exports to China over the next decade while China agreed to eliminate domestic production over that period. Following this treaty E.D. Sassoon & Co. retreated from the opium trade, eventually stopping it completely. Instead the company invested further in its cotton mill business in Bombay. By the First World War E.D. Sassoon & Co. had grown into India's single largest textile group and was renowned for their advanced production technology.

In 1909 Sir Jacob Elias Sassoon also played a very prominent role in forming the "Eastern Bank", taking advantage of the bank's facilities to make themselves less vulnerable to fluctuations of the Indian rupee. On 1 January 1921, E.D. Sassoon & Co. Ltd was incorporated as a private trading and banking company, giving up its old partnership structure.

After the death of Sir Edward Elias Sasoon (1853–1924) and his younger brother Meyer Harry Sassoon (1875–1924) within a year, Sir Edward Elias Sassoons son Sir Victor Sassoon (1881–1961) and Meyer Harry Sassoon's widow Mozelle Gubbay (1872–1964) became the main owners of the company with combined business assets of £15 million. Sir Victor Sassoon became the chairman of the company and Meyer Harry Sassoon's son-in-law, Derek Fitzgerald (1892–1967), was appointed manager of the London and Manchester branches.

In 1927, E.D. Sassoon & Co. Ltd was already the largest cotton mill owner in Bombay, where it was still headquartered. When the Great Depression in 1929-30 drove E.D. Sassoons biggest competitors into bankruptcy, the company took them over. By the time the Second World War broke out in Europe, E.D. Sassoon & Co. owned 15 cotton mills and was with over 30,000 employees Bombay's largest private employer.

The profits generated in Bombay were reinvested in luxury real estate and hotels in Shanghai. In 1923 E.D. Sassoon & Co. bought the majority of shares of the established produce firm "Arnhold & Co." of Shanghai, which in turn controlled the "Cathay Land Company". The latter owned several apartment buildings and a hotel in Shanghai and offered the perfect basis for further investments in Shanghai property.

In 1928 Sir Victor Sassoon established the "E.D. Sassoon Banking Company Limited" as a subsidiary of "E.D. Sassoon & Co. Ltd", to coordinate the trading interests of his family. In March 1930 E.D. Sassoon & Co. new headquarter was opened at "Sassoon House" in Shanghai.

The Second World War brought many changes to the E.D. Sassoon Group.

After Sir Victor Sassoon's death the banking subsidiary, E.D. Sassoon Banking & Co. Ltd., was sold in 1972 to the merchant bank "Wallace Brothers & Co. (Holdings) Ltd" and renamed "Wallace Brothers Sassoon Bank Ltd." in November 1974, which in turn was taken over by the Standard Chartered Bank in 1976. The parent company, E.D. Sassoon & Co., continued to operate as a separate company from 1972 until 1978 when it became "DK Investments (Crosby Square) Ltd." (4 Crosby Square, City of London).

The "Sir Victor Sassoon Heart Foundation", set up by Lady Sassoon after her husband's death, is run from Nassau, where the family still lives.

== See also ==
- David Sassoon
- Sassoon family
- David Sassoon & Co.
- List of trading companies
- History of opium in China
