= Albert Sassoon =

Baghdad-born businessman and philanthropist

Sir Albert Sassoon Bt KCB CSI
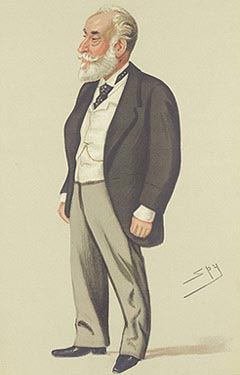
- 1879 caricature by "Spy" of Albert Sassoon "The Indian Rothschild" from Vanity Fair
- Born: Abdullah David Sassoon; 25 July 1818; Baghdad, Ottoman Iraq
- Died: 24 October 1896 (aged 78); Brighton, England
- Citizenship: British
- Occupations: Businessman, banker, and philanthropist
- Spouse: Hannah Meyer Moise (m. 1838; died 1895)
- Children: 6, including Edward
- Parent(s): David Sassoon; Hannah Joseph
- Relatives: Sassoon family

Sir Albert Abdullah David Sassoon, 1st Baronet, KCB, CSI (25 July 1818 – 24 October 1896) was a Baghdad-born businessman and philanthropist.

== Biography ==
=== Life and career ===
Sassoon was born on 25 July 1818 in Baghdad, Ottoman Empire, into the Sassoon family of Baghdadi Jews. His father was David Sassoon (1792–1864). He was educated in British India. After his father's death, he served as head of his family's merchant company 'David Sassoon & Sons' (later 'David Sassoon & Co.').

In 1874, under Albert Sassoon's leadership, David Sassoon & Sons established in Bombay (now Mumbai) a new subsidiary, the 'Sassoon Spinning and Weaving Company', which opened several cotton mills there. In 1875 the company built the Sassoon Docks, the first wet docks in Bombay. The company was also instrumental in the founding of the Imperial Bank of Persia in 1889.

After a visit to England in 1873, Albert Sassoon settled there permanently in 1875 to direct 'David Sassoon & Sons' from London. The management of the company's affairs in Bombay was left to his younger brother Solomon David Sassoon (1841–1894).

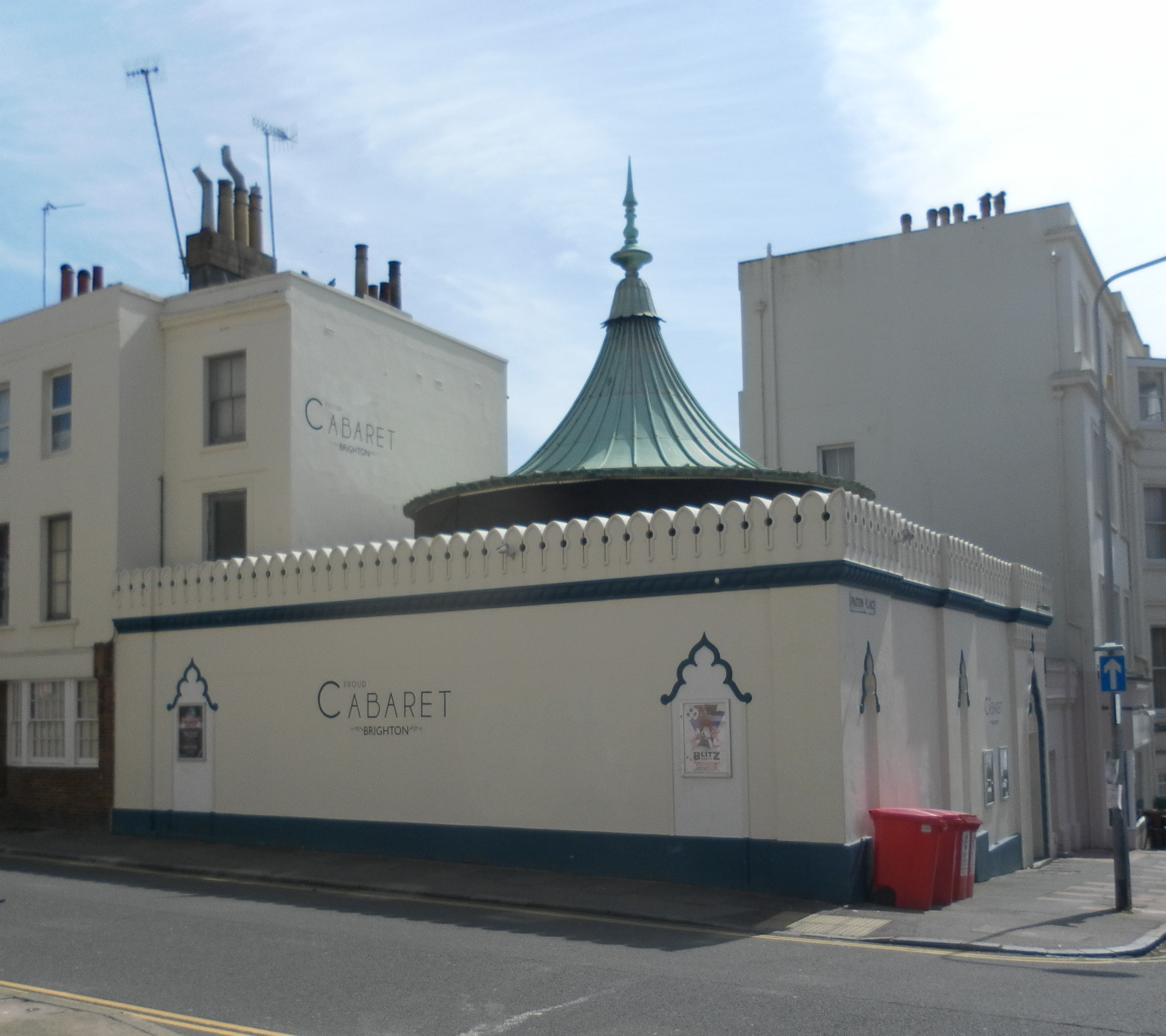
The Sassoon Mausoleum in Kemptown, Brighton

Albert Sassoon died in Brighton in 1896, aged 78, and was buried there in the Sassoon Mausoleum, which he had built. In 1933 his body was removed and reburied in the Liberal Jewish Cemetery, Willesden in London. A mausoleum was also built for him in the Jewish Cemetery, Chinchpokli.

=== Philanthropy and honours ===
He was a major benefactor to the city of Bombay. Among his gifts was a significant contribution towards the reconstruction of the Elphinstone High School and the erection of a large equestrian statue of Edward, Prince of Wales, commemorating his visit to India in 1875. He also financed many scholarships and became a close adviser to the government on educational and building projects.

Albert Sassoon donated Rs. 60,000, while the Government of Bombay Presidency bore the remainder of the cost of Rs. 65,000, for the construction of the David Sassoon Library and Reading Room on Rampart Row, Kala Ghoda in Bombay. Its construction was completed in 1870, and like many buildings in the vicinity such as Elphinstone College, Army and Navy Buildings and Watson's Hotel, it was built using yellow Malad stone.

The Victoria and Albert Museum, Bombay (now Dr. Bhau Daji Lad Museum) was built with the patronage of many wealthy Indian businessmen and philanthropists including Albert Sassoon, Sir Jamsetjee Jejeebhoy and Jaganath Shunkerseth.

In 1866 Sassoon was made a Companion of the Order of the Star of India (CSI), and in 1872 a Knight Commander of the Order of the Bath (KCB). Around the same time he received the Order of the Lion and the Sun from the Shah of Persia for "work in Persia and his services in the development of Persian commerce". During his visit to England in 1873 he received the freedom of the City of London. After Sassoon had settled in England, a baronetcy was created for him in 1890.

=== Family ===
Albert Sassoon married Hannah Meyer Moise (1823–1895) in 1838. They had six children. The eldest son was Edward Sassoon (1856–1912), the father of Philip Sassoon (1888–1939) and Sybil Cholmondeley, Marchioness of Cholmondeley (1894–1989). His daughter Aziza Sassoon (1839–1897) married Ezekiel Abraham Gubbay (1824–1896) and was the mother of Flora Sassoon.

Albert Sassoon's father, David Sassoon (1792–1864), was a leading Baghdad merchant and a treasurer under Ahmet Pasha, the Governor of Baghdad. However, he fled after he was implicated in a corruption scandal, moving from Baghdad to Bushire in Persia, and settled in Bombay in 1832, where he founded a large mercantile business, called "David Sassoon & Sons".

Albert Sassoon's great-great-great-grandson is the actor Jack Huston.

Baronetage of the United Kingdom
New creation	Baronet (of Kensington Gore); 1890–1896	Succeeded by Edward Sassoon
