= Frederick David Sassoon =

- Born: 1 May 1853; Bombay, British India
- Died: 4 May 1917 (aged 64); London, England, U.K.
- Occupations: Merchant and banker
- Spouse: Jeanette Raphael
- Children: 1
- Parents: David Sassoon (father); Farha Hyeem (mother)

Frederick David Sassoon (1 May 1853 – 4 May 1917) was an India-born Anglo-Jewish merchant and banker in Hong Kong and China.

== Early life ==
Sassoon was born in Bombay, British India on 1 May 1853, Frederick David Sassoon was the eighth son of David Sassoon, founder of the famous firm of merchant and bankers in the East, David Sassoon & Co.

== Career ==
Sassoon spent most of his working life in Hong Kong and was unofficial member of the Legislative Council of Hong Kong as the representative of the Justices of the Peace from 1884 to 1887. He became Chairman of David Sassoon & Co. in London and also Director of the Imperial Bank of Persia.

== Personal ==
He married Jeanette (Jenny) Raphael (1859–?), daughter of Edward L. Raphael from another great merchant banking dynasty. They had a son named Ronald Edward David Sassoon (1895–1924), who died of a heart attack while visiting the Bagdad office of David Sassoon & Co.

Frederick David Sassoon left £696,400 when he died on 14 May 1917 at 17 Knightsbridge, London.

== See also ==
- Sassoon family

Business positions
Preceded by Hans Christian Heinrich Hoppius	Chairman of the Hongkong and Shanghai Banking Corporation; 1878–1879	Succeeded by William H. Forbes
Preceded by Alexander Palmer MacEwen	Chairman of the Hongkong and Shanghai Banking Corporation; 1885–1886	Succeeded by A. McIver
Legislative Council of Hong Kong
New seat	Unofficial Member; Representative for Justices of the Peace; 1884–1887	Succeeded by Paul Chater
