= Sassoon family =

Baghdadi Jewish wealthy family

Sassoon
- Family
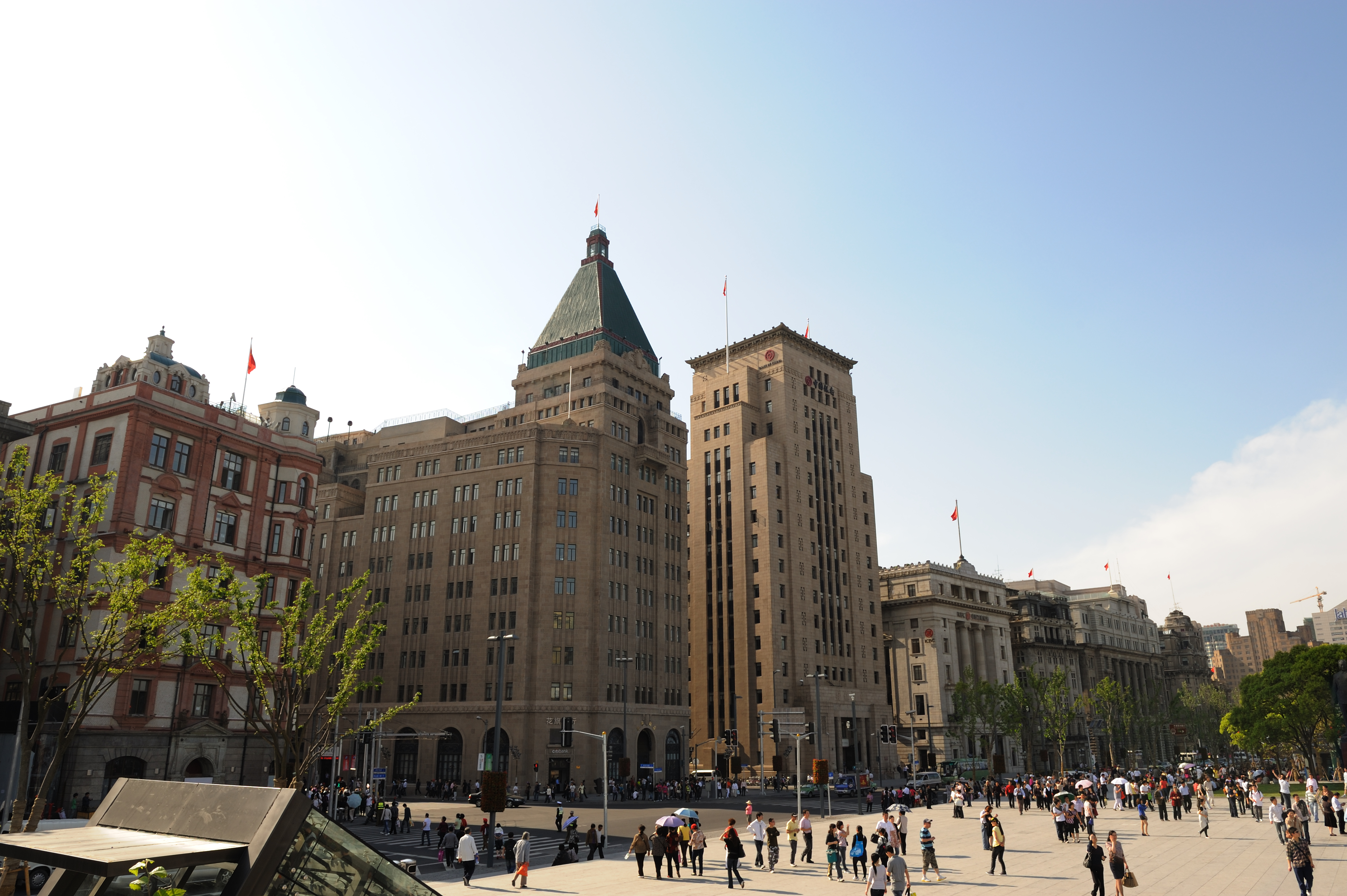
- Sassoon House, Shanghai, China
- Current region: Asia; United Kingdom
- Etymology: Sasson (Hebrew: שָׂשׂוֹן, lit. 'joy' or 'gladness')
- Origin: Aleppo, Syria; Baghdad, Iraq
- Founder: Sassoon ben Salih
- Current head: James Sassoon, Baron Sassoon
- Titles: Sassoon baronets
- Members: David (1792–1864); Joseph (1795–1872); Sir Albert David, 1st Baronet (1818–1896); Elias David (1820–1880); Sassoon David Sassoon (1832–1867); Reuben (1835–1905); Arthur Abraham David (1840–1912); Solomon David Sassoon (1841–1894); Sir Sassoon David, 1st Baronet (1849–1926); Frederick (1853–1917); Edward Shellim (c. 1869–1928); Sir Edward Albert, 2nd Baronet (1856–1912); Rachel Beer (1858–1927); Alfred Ezra (1872–1955); Lady Rachel Ezra (1877–1952); David Solomon (1880–1942); Sir Victor, 3rd Baronet (1881–1961); Captain Siegfried (1886–1967); Sir Philip, 3rd Baronet (1888–1939); Sir Percival David, 2nd Baronet (1892–1964); Sybil Rachel Betty Cecile (1894–1989); Rabbi Solomon David (1915–1985); George (1936–2006); Rabbi Isaac S.D. (1946– ); Baron James (1955– ); Adrian (1961– ); Kathryn Harrison (1961– )
- Connected members: Sir Cavendish Boyle (1849–1916); Theresa Thornycroft (1853–1947); Flora (Farha) Gubbay (1859–1936); Aline Caroline de Rothschild (1867–1909); Hugh, 6th Marquess of Cholmondeley (1919–1990); David, 7th Marquess of Cholmondeley (1960– )
- Connected families: Rothschild family; Thornycroft family
- Traditions: Judaism

The Sassoon family were a wealthy Baghdadi Jewish dynasty, associated with finance, banking, capital markets, the exploration of oil and gas, Judaism, Conservative politics, opium trading and philanthropy. Their principal vehicles, Sassoon & Co. and J. Sassoon Financial Group LLC, are domiciled in Europe, Asia and North America.

The family was known as "the Rothschilds of the East" due to the immense wealth they accumulated in Asia. The family's businesses in China, India, and Hong Kong especially, were built to capitalise on the opium trade. As more family members gravitated toward London, they became prominent in England and were ennobled by Queen Victoria.

Although most biographical data about the Sassoons lists Baghdad, Iraq, as their place of origins, Daniel Gross, an American journalist, has written that the Sassoon family has their origins in Aleppo, Syria. They later moved to Mumbai in India, and then emigrated to China, England, and other countries. From the 18th century, the Sassoons were one of the wealthiest families in the world, with a corporate empire spanning Asia.

== Etymology ==
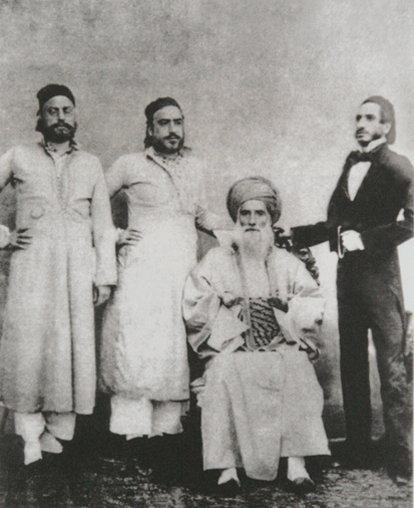
David Sassoon (seated) and his sons Elias David, Albert (Abdallah) & Sassoon David

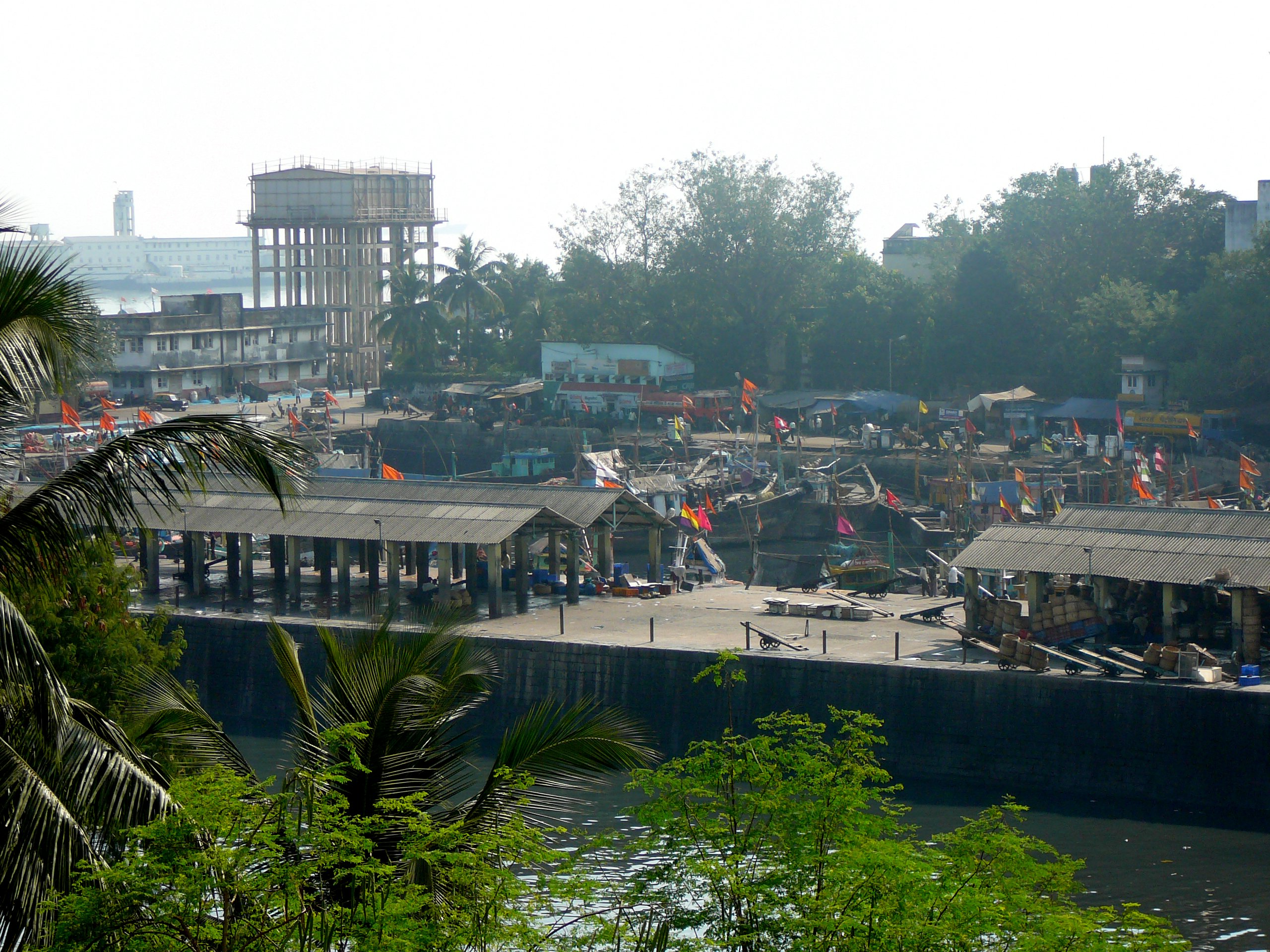
The Sassoon Docks, Mumbai, India

The Hebrew word sasson (Hebrew: שָׂשׂוֹן) literally means "joy" or "gladness." The name of the family strongly implies a local, Mesopotamian origin. The family name of Sassoon is also commonly shared by many Kurdish families and tribes who all originate from the mountainous district of Sason (whence the family and tribal names), west of Lake Van, in upper Mesopotamia in modern Turkey. It is, however, possible that some Spanish Sephardi blood was mixed with the primarily Mesopotamian Jewish Sasoons.

== Origins ==
Sassoon ben Salih (1750–1830) and his family were the chief treasurers to the pashas of Baghdad and Southern Iraq. His sons David (1792–1864) and Joseph Sassoon (1795–1872) fled from a new and unfriendly wāli, Dawud Pasha.

An important Jewish banker named Sassoon was hanged by the Ottoman Turks at the conclusion of the Siege of Kut al Amarah in April 1916. He may have been a member of David's branch of the family or of Joseph Sassoon's branch (see below).

== David S. Sassoon ==
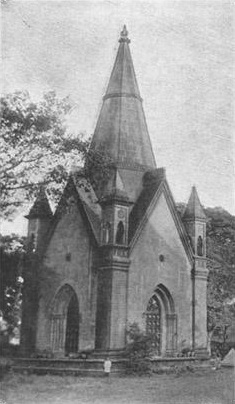
Tomb of David Sassoon, Pune, India

In 1828, David first went to the Persian Gulf port of Bushehr and in 1832 to Bombay, India, with his large family. Over 39 years, with two wives, he fathered 14 children. In Bombay, he built the international business called David Sassoon & Sons Company, with the policy of staffing it with people brought from Baghdad. They filled the functions of the various branches of his business in India, Burma, Malaya, and east Asia. He cemented the family's dominant position in the Sino-Indian opium trade. The family's businesses in China, and Hong Kong especially, were built to capitalise on the opium business. His business extended to China, where Sassoon House (now the north wing of the Peace Hotel) on the Bund in Shanghai became a noted landmark, and then to England. In each branch, he maintained a rabbi. His philanthropy across Asia included the building of schools, orphanages, hospitals, and museums. On his death, tributes to him were made from across the continent by Muslims, Christians, Parsees, Jews, and Hindus.

=== Children of David ===
Sassoon's eight sons also branched out in many directions. The Sassoon family was heavily involved in the shipping and the opium trade in China and India.

Elias David Sassoon

Elias David (1820–1880), his son by his first wife, had been the first of the sons to go to China, in 1844. He later returned to Bombay, before leaving the firm to establish E.D. Sassoon & Co. in 1867, with offices in Bombay and Shanghai.

Albert Abdullah David Sassoon

Albert Abdullah David (1818–1896) took on the running of the firm on his father's death, and notably constructed the Sassoon Docks, the first wet dock built in western India. With two of his brothers he later became prominent in England, and the family were friends of the Prince of Wales, later King Edward VII.

Sassoon David Sassoon (1832-1867)

Rachel Sassoon Beer

One daughter of the family, Rachel Sassoon Beer, joined her husband in running a number of British newspapers, including The Sunday Times (1893–1904) and The Observer, which she also edited.

=== Grandchildren and subsequent heirs of David ===
Sir Edward Albert Sassoon

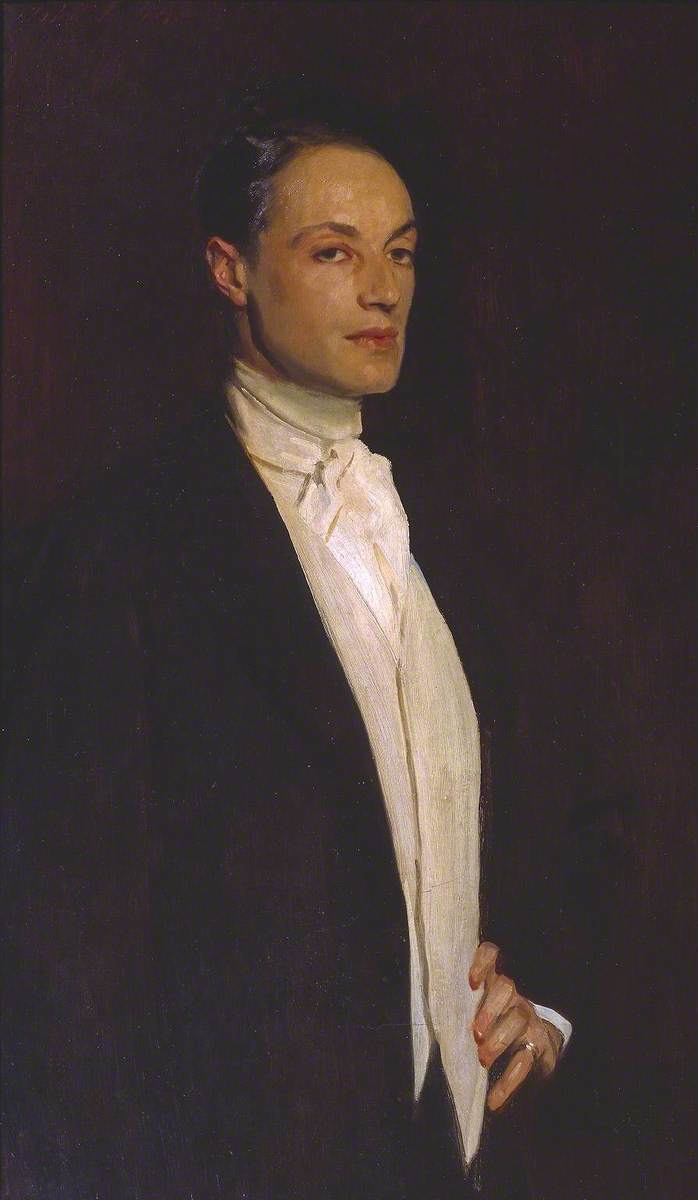
Sir Philip Sassoon, John Singer Sargent, 1923

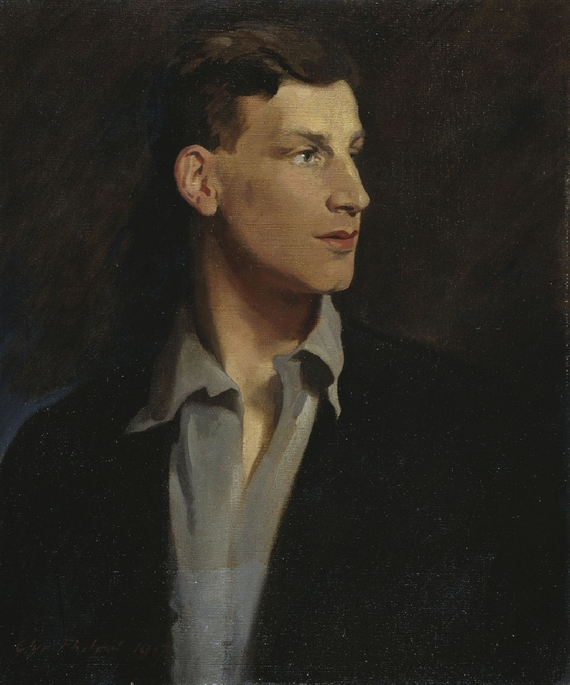
Portrait of Siegfried Sassoon by Glyn Warren Philpot, 1917. Fitzwilliam Museum

Sir Edward Albert (1856–1912), the son of Albert, married Aline Caroline de Rothschild, settled in England, and was a Conservative member of Parliament from 1899 until his death. The seat was then inherited by his son Sir Philip Sassoon (1888–1939) from 1912 until his death. Philip served in the First World War as military secretary to Field Marshal Sir Douglas Haig and, during the 1920s and 1930s, as Britain's undersecretary of state for air.

Siegfried Sassoon

The twentieth-century English poet, one of the best known World War I poets, Siegfried Sassoon (1886–1967) was the son of Alfred Ezra Sassoon, son of Sassoon David Sassoon, and therefore David's great-grandson.

James Sassoon, Baron Sassoon

James Sassoon, Baron Sassoon, born as James Meyer, is a British banker and former Treasury's commercial secretary. James was mentioned in the Paradise Papers as one of the beneficiaries of a tax-exempt Cayman Island trust fund worth $236 million in 2007 and defended it as being of non-UK origin.

David Solomon Sassoon

David Solomon (1880–1942) collected Jewish books and manuscripts and catalogued them in two volumes. The dispersal of David Solomon Sassoon’s manuscript collection began with a series of Sotheby’s sales in 1975, 1978, 1981, and 1984, through which hundreds of Hebrew and Samaritan manuscripts passed into public and private collections in Israel, Europe, North America, and elsewhere. The dispersal has continued through subsequent auctions, resales, and institutional acquisitions into the present, with individual manuscripts now held across libraries, museums, and private collections worldwide. The son of David Solomon and Selina (Sarah Ziskha) Prins (1883–1967), Solomon David Sassoon (1915–1985), carried the family's rabbinical tradition and moved from Letchworth to London and then to Jerusalem in 1970. Solomon David Sassoon had two sons, Isaac S. D. Sassoon and David Solomon Sassoon, who are both rabbis.

== Joseph Sassoon ==
Joseph Sassoon first went to Thessaloniki, Greece and later to Aleppo, Syria, where he established a merchant house and later his business interests spread to Alexandria, Cairo, Morocco and Italy which included a shipping company and a money exchange house. His five sons branched out in many directions.

=== Children of Joseph ===
Moses Sassoon

Moses Sassoon (1828–1909) returned to Baghdad in 1852 before moving to Egypt where he built the financial house Joseph Sassoon & Sons, which later expanded and became an agent for Crédit Foncier in Egypt.

=== Grandchildren of Joseph and heirs ===
In 1871 Moses' son, Jacob (1850–1936), was one of the largest cotton plantation owners in Egypt, and owned cotton mills.

His older brother, Ruben (1840–1917), made a fortune exporting Egyptian cotton during the American civil war to England making him at the time Egypt's largest cotton exporter. In 1927, with Misr Bank and other Egyptian businessmen, Jacob founded the Misr Spinning and Weaving Company (Arabic: شركة مصر للغزل والنسيج), also known as Misr Helwan or the El-Ghazl factory owning 61% of the company's shares. Jacob also founded Egypt's Crédit Foncier with Joseph Vita Mosseri.

Jacob's son, Nissim Joseph (1910–1988), was an architect who designed the Assicurazioni Generali di Trieste Building. Nissim Joseph was also a real estate investor and developer, who foresaw the unparalleled growth of Cairo and the lucrative effect such expansion would have on land values. It is not surprising, that many of the properties he invested in were located at the nexus of the elegant European quarter of Ismailia or in the choicest parts of Kasr al-Dubara, and later, in Garden City, Zamalek, and Giza.

==== Eliau (Elias) Nissim Joseph Sassoon ====
The son of Nissim and Messouda Sassoon (born Shamash) (1912–1992) was Eliau (Elias) Nissim Joseph Sassoon (1926–2010), (Hebrew: אליהו נסים אליאו יוסף ששון), always called Elias. He was born in Aleppo, Syria and went on to become the most influential and wealthiest descendant of Joseph. In 1940, Elias commenced his education at Victoria College, a prestigious boarding school in Alexandria and joined his family's business in 1946 where he worked for the family's firm in Alexandria.

Among the many holdings the family had at the time were interests in Burmah Oil, Turkish Petroleum Company and the Anglo-Iranian Oil Company, a textile factory, a large cotton export business and interests in both the General Company of Commerce and Industry of Greece (later Attica Enterprises Holding S.A.) and Atlas Maritime.

In 1947 Elias focused his attention on three primary sectors: the newly booming oil exploration industry sweeping the Middle East, shipping and banking. With a £5,000 loan from his father, Elias invested in Standard Oil adding to his family's existing holdings in the company. That same year he married Hannah Rochel Jacque Sassoon (née de Menasche) (1929–2009), granddaughter of Baron Jacques Bohor Yacoub Levi de Menashe (d.1916).

His great-grandfather, Moses, had been an investor in Socony-Vacuum Oil Company, which later partnered with Standard Oil to provide markets for the oil reserves in the Middle East. In 1906, Socony (later Mobil) opened its first fuel terminals in Alexandria with financing secured with help from Sassoon. Elias was a devoted Zionist and considered the British anything but friends to the Jewish people because of their blockade in the Mediterranean to refugee vessels carrying Jewish refugees of World War II. Due to systematic anti-Semitism among the British political establishment, and the UK's policies towards Jewish refugees fleeing Nazi Germany, he considered the British government just as culpable as the Nazis to the atrocities committed against world Jewry. Elias provided material aid and funds to help smuggle Jews out of Europe to what would later become Israel. He was aided by Capt. Leo Lemos (1913–1989), of the Lemos Greek shipping family. Elias helped pay for and secure vessels to help smuggle Jewish refugees break the British blockade to Israel. Elias was arrested on several occasions by British CID as a result of violating British Home Office and Mandate policies on Jewish immigration to Palestine.

In 1952 he co-founded Banque du Caire with his childhood friend Moise Joseph Maurice Cattaui (1925–2009). By then Elias had expanded his family's business to France, Brazil, South Africa and the United States where the family exported cotton to and had maintained trading posts since the 1800s.

The Sassoons believed that Mesopotamia (now Syria and Iraq) contained substantial reservoirs of oil, thus becoming early investors in the Turkish Petroleum Company (TPC), the forerunner of the Iraq Petroleum Company (IPC). Elias' great-grandfather, Moses, was among the first to secure the interest of the Imperial German banks and companies, already involved in the building of the Berlin–Baghdad railway, which he played an active role in its financing. This German interest was followed by British interests when Moses' brother, David Solomon, became an agent for the Rothschilds in the Ottoman Empire. In 1911, in an attempt to bring together British and German interests competing in the region, Elias formed a consortium of British investors composed of banks and companies and formed the African and Eastern Concession Ltd.

In 1953 Elias used these networks of interests to expand his family's interests to include mining concessions in Africa. In 1957 the new Egyptian post-revolution government under Nasser nationalized all European particularly British and French companies and banks. The government also began expelling foreigners and Jews from Egypt. Once again, the Jewish communities of the Middle East found themselves facing grave danger, false imprisonment, arbitrary arrests without due process, pogroms, and antisemitic policies forcing the community to abandon their homes, render them stateless, and subject to discriminatory policies, many were forced to leave the country with no more than one suitcase and most had their assets and properties seized by the Revolutionary Council.

The Sassoons were among those whose assets were confiscated, and in 1966 Elias and his wife were taken to the port of Alexandria and expelled from the country. Elias' wife, who was an Egyptian citizen, was declared a non-citizen, and at the Egyptian government's declaration, Elias' Syrian citizenship was revoked. They were given laissez-passer (travel documents) and ordered aboard a ship bound for Greece. However, their son Shlomo (Solomon) Elias Sassoon (1948–1985), who was a medical student at the University of Alexandria, was denied an exit visa.

The government accused Elias of using his family's banking network to help smuggle assets belonging to members of the Jewish community out of the country. The government's order alleged: "thus depriving Egyptian treasury of assets accumulated by foreigners and Jews on the backs of the Egyptian people". Although these assets were legally acquired over a century through trade and reinvestments in the country, the government demanded that Elias return his assets held in Europe before his son is allowed to leave the country. After paying what amounted to ransom money, totaling £4 million and the intervention of both the French government and the Greek Royal family, Shlomo joined his family in 1971, with his wife Josephine Celine Esther (née Cattaui) (1949–1994), daughter of Moise Cattaui who was also denied exit visa after her family was expelled from the country in 1966.

Elias established Sassoon Cattaui Investment Holding (later Providence Group), a privately owned family hedge fund with Moise Cattaui in 1961 in Switzerland with assets from the Sassoon Family Trust, which had been formed in Lausanne, Switzerland in 1956. In 1983, the partners moved the company to Curaçao (Netherlands Antilles), the firm operated as a private family investment fund, which is not required to register with the SEC or comply with reporting requirements under the Dodd–Frank reform act. It is said that at the time of the formation of the Fund, the total value of assets under management in 1961 was £25 million.

The Fund invested in commercial real estate in the U.S., Canada, and Europe as well as in precious metals, oil & gas, and securities. The fund also speculated in the currency and energy markets, among its many holdings are: BHP, Le Méridien hotel company with, American Express, General Motors, Wells Fargo, HSBC, Lehman Brothers, ExxonMobil, ConocoPhillips, Fendi, Giorgio Armani, Sun Microsystems, Midland Bank, and stockbroking firm Frankel Pollak (which was later sold to Sasfin Bank, a Sassoon family bank based in South Africa). It is rumoured that at the time of Elias Sassoon's death, the Fund, had over US$100 billion of assets under management, most of which are assets of both the Sassoon and the Cattaui families, currently managed by the Sassoon Family Continuation Trust.

== Legacy ==
Today, Sassoon & Co is the only surviving firm of both branches of the Sassoon dynasty, a private equity and investment banking firm providing investment management, corporate and trade finance and global advisory services to its clients. The firm maintains a strong focus on the U.S. and Israeli markets, it invests in composite material, oil & gas, financial services, mining, and food security in the U.S., Israel, and Africa. After acquiring the remaining assets of the David Sassoon & Co Ltd before its sale to UBS of Switzerland, the firm changed management and rebranded before moving its headquarters from Switzerland to the United States. The firm is owned today by J. Sassoon Financial Group LLC, which is the business arm of the Sassoon Family Continuation Trust. David Shlomo Sassoon is its non-executive chairman. While keeping true to its trading heritage, the firm is heavily involved in banking and the capital markets, capitalizing on its centuries old brand among other investment houses, private banks, and multinational financial institutions.
