= Sassoon Mausoleum =

Former tomb, now a music venue, in Brighton, England

Coordinates: 50.8178°N 0.1189°W

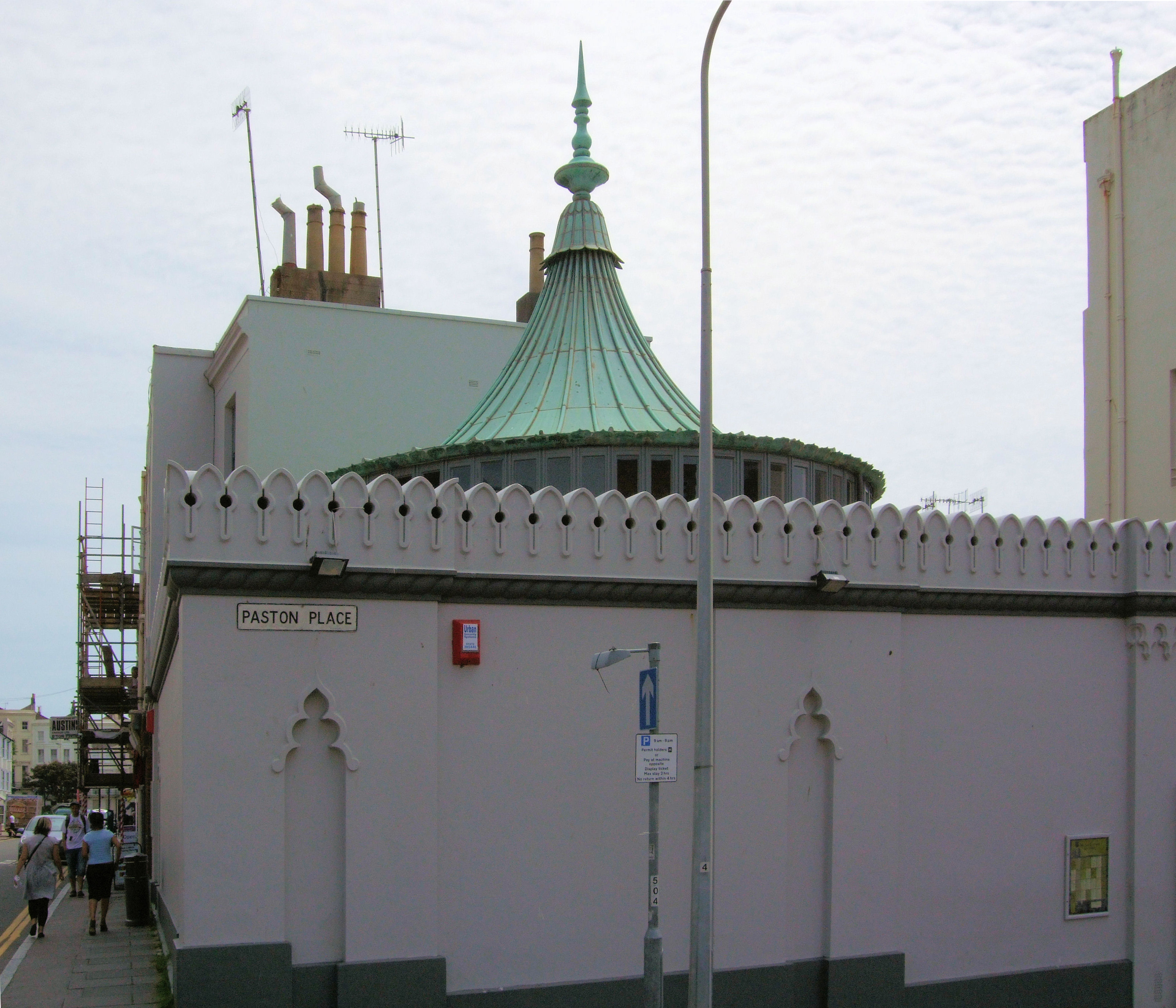
Sassoon Mausoleum (Hanbury Club), 2008

The Sassoon Mausoleum is the former grave of Sir Albert Sassoon and other members of his family, including Sir Edward Sassoon, 2nd Baronet, of Kensington Gore. It stands at 83 St George's Road in Brighton, England. The single-storey building, which is Grade II listed, has since served as a furniture depository and an air-raid shelter, and since being purchased by a brewery in 1949 has remained a pub or bar.

== History ==
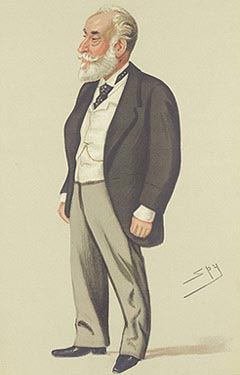
Illustration of Albert Sassoon from Vanity Fair, 16 August 1879

Albert Abdullah David Sassoon was born in Baghdad in 1818 to a prominent, Sephardic Jewish family. After many years spent managing the family's banking and merchant shipping business in Bombay, India, he retired to England where he was created a baronet. He died in Brighton in 1896.

The mausoleum was built in 1892 as a wing of the family home located at 1 Eastern Terrace. The Sassoons are known to have received many distinguished visitors, including Edward VII twice, while he was Prince of Wales. Due to the property being sold, in 1933 the remains of the Sassoon family were removed and reburied at the Liberal Jewish Cemetery, Willesden in London.

The former mausoleum was for a time a furniture depository. During World War II it was used as an air raid shelter during fierce bombings. In 1949 it was purchased by a brewery for use as a pub – The Bombay Bar. In 2001 the mausoleum housed the Brighton Arms pub. In 2003 it was bought and the name changed to "The Hanbury Club".

In 2006 the mausoleum, which is located in the Kemptown neighbourhood of Brighton, underwent a £60,000 refurbishment. The new decor was intended to evoke the supper clubs of the 1920s and 1930s, and the venue featured live performances of contemporary music. In 2011 the mausoleum reopened as Proud Cabaret Brighton.

== Architecture ==
The mausoleum is a single-storey building notable for its "flamboyant" trumpet-shaped, Indo-Saracenic dome. The copper dome was originally covered in gold leaf. The Indo-Saracenic theme is carried out in lotus-leaf crenellations along the parapet and the lobed arches of the front door. The colourful "Bollywood" ceiling murals were applied by a later owner and are not original to the mausoleum.

The circle of pointed horseshoe arch windows on the drum of the dome were restored in the early 21st century.

The mausoleum is now a Grade II listed building.

== See also ==
- Grade II listed buildings in Brighton and Hove: S
