= David Mordecai =

Indian photographer (1909–1973)

David Mordecai

David Mordecai (1909-1973) was an Indian photographer in Calcutta whose subjects included the Nehrus, Tenzing Norgay, Sir Edmund Hillary, and King Mahendra and Queen Ratna of Nepal.

== Early life and family ==
Mordecai was born in Calcutta, India, in 1909, the son of Isaac and Esther Mordecai. His family was part of the Baghdadi Jewish community of Calcutta.

Mordecai married Trixie David in 1935 and they had three daughters, Esthére, Anita, and Cheryl; six grandchildren: Rian, Lee, Steven, Amiel, Rachael, and Daniel, and four great-grandchildren: Samuel, Amir, Shamira, and Poppy.

== Career ==
Originally destined for the family business of Daw Sen & Company, makers of condiments, Mordecai eventually broke out to start his own photography business after showing aptitude for the subject as a child when his mother gave him a Kodak box camera as a gift.

Mordecai developed a large business in producing society portraits, souvenirs for tourists, documentary and topographical works, and official photographs for businesses, including Indian railways. His portraits included the Nehrus, Tenzing Norgay, Sir Edmund Hillary, and King Mahendra, and Queen Ratna of Nepal. His studio at one time had over 100 employees. His output covered the transitional period of the last days of the British Raj and the first days of independent India.

== Death ==
Mordecai died in 1973 after suffering ill health in his later years.

== Selected publications ==
- India Through the Camera's Eye
- His Majesty King Mahendra Bir Bikram Shaha Deva. An analytical biography. Bombay, Nityand Society, c. 1963. (Editor)
- The Himalayas: An illustrated summary of the world's highest mountain ranges. Calcutta, Daw Sen, 1966.

== See also ==
- History of the Jews in Kolkata
