= Sasson =

Sasson (Hebrew: ששון) is a Hebrew name which means happiness, a surname commonly found among Jews of Levantine origin.

== Given name ==
- Sasson Gabai, Israeli actor
- Sasson Ifram Shaulov, Israeli singer

== Surname ==
- Binyamin Sasson (1903–1989), Israeli politician
- Eliyahu Sasson (1902–1978), Israeli politician and minister
- Guy Sasson (born 1980), Israeli Paralympic wheelchair tennis player
- Jean Sasson (born 1947), American writer
- Max Sasson (born 2000), American ice hockey player
- Moti Sasson (born 1947), Mayor of Holon, Israel
- Or Sasson (born 1990), Israeli Olympic judoka
- Steven Sasson (born 1950), inventor of the digital camera
- Talia Sasson, member of the State Prosecution Criminal Department, editor of the Sasson Report

== See also ==
- Sasson Gabai (born 1947), Israeli actor
- Sasson Somekh (1933–2019), Israeli academic, writer and translator
- Sasson Jeans, defunct American clothes brand
- Sassoon (disambiguation)
