= Baghdadi Jews =

Jewish ethnic group from the Middle East

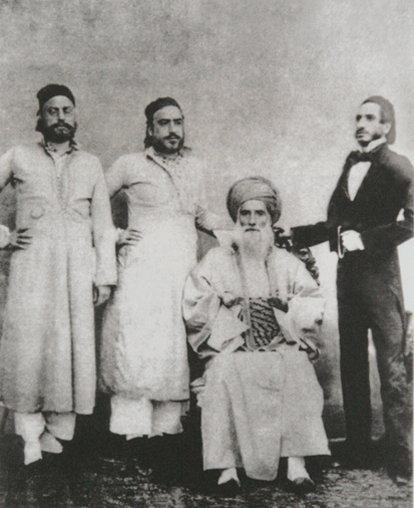
- Prominent Baghdadi Jewish patriarch David Sassoon (seated) and his sons Elias David, Albert (Abdullah), and Sassoon David Sassoon

Total population
- 50,000 in 1900

Regions with significant populations
- India 100 (chiefly Mumbai and Calcutta); Israel, United Kingdom, Canada, Australia, Singapore, Hong Kong, and the United States

Languages
- Traditionally Arabic, Persian, Judeo-Urdu and Bengali; Now mostly English and Hebrew

Religion
- Judaism

Baghdadi Jews (Hebrew: יהודים בגדדים, romanized: Yehudim Bagdadim; Arabic: اليهود البغداد, romanized: al-Yahūd al-Baghdadi) is an umbrella term which covers the former communities of Jewish migrants who emigrated from various parts of the Middle East to India in the 18th and 19th century, up until the Second World War. Beginning under the Mughal Empire, they settled primarily in the ports and along the trade routes around the Indian Ocean. While the main representatives of the community were Iraqi Jews, the Baghdadi Jewish community of India attracted a modest flow of Jewish emigrants from Syria, Egypt, Yemen, Iran, Central Asia and Turkey. They flourished under the British Empire in the 19th century, growing to be English-speaking and British oriented.

These Jewish groups grew into a tight trading and kinship network across Asia with smaller Baghdadi communities being established beyond India in the mid-nineteenth century in Burma, Singapore, Hong Kong and Shanghai. Baghdadi trading outposts were established further across Asia, and into Southeast Asia and Oceania, with families settling in Japan, Malaysia, Indonesia, and Australia.

The Second World War brought strife to India, the Japanese occupation of Burma, Hong Kong and Shanghai, then swiftly the end of the British Empire in Asia. Dislocated by war, the violence of the Indian Partition, rising nationalism and the uncertainty of independence in both India and Burma, an exodus began to the newly founded state of Israel, the United Kingdom and Australia. Their old trade routes severed by first Communist victory in China, the ocean trade stifled in India and Burma by postcolonial nationalizations and trade restrictions, the Baghdadi Jews had emigrated almost in their entirety by the 1970s. Families of Baghdadi Jewish descent continue to play a major role in Jewish life, especially in Great Britain where families such as the Sassoons and Reubens have enjoyed great prominence in business and politics.

== Precolonial origins ==
Though Jewish traders from the Middle East had crossed the Indian Ocean since ancient Rome, sources from the Mughal Empire first mention Jewish merchants from Baghdad trading with India in the 17th century.

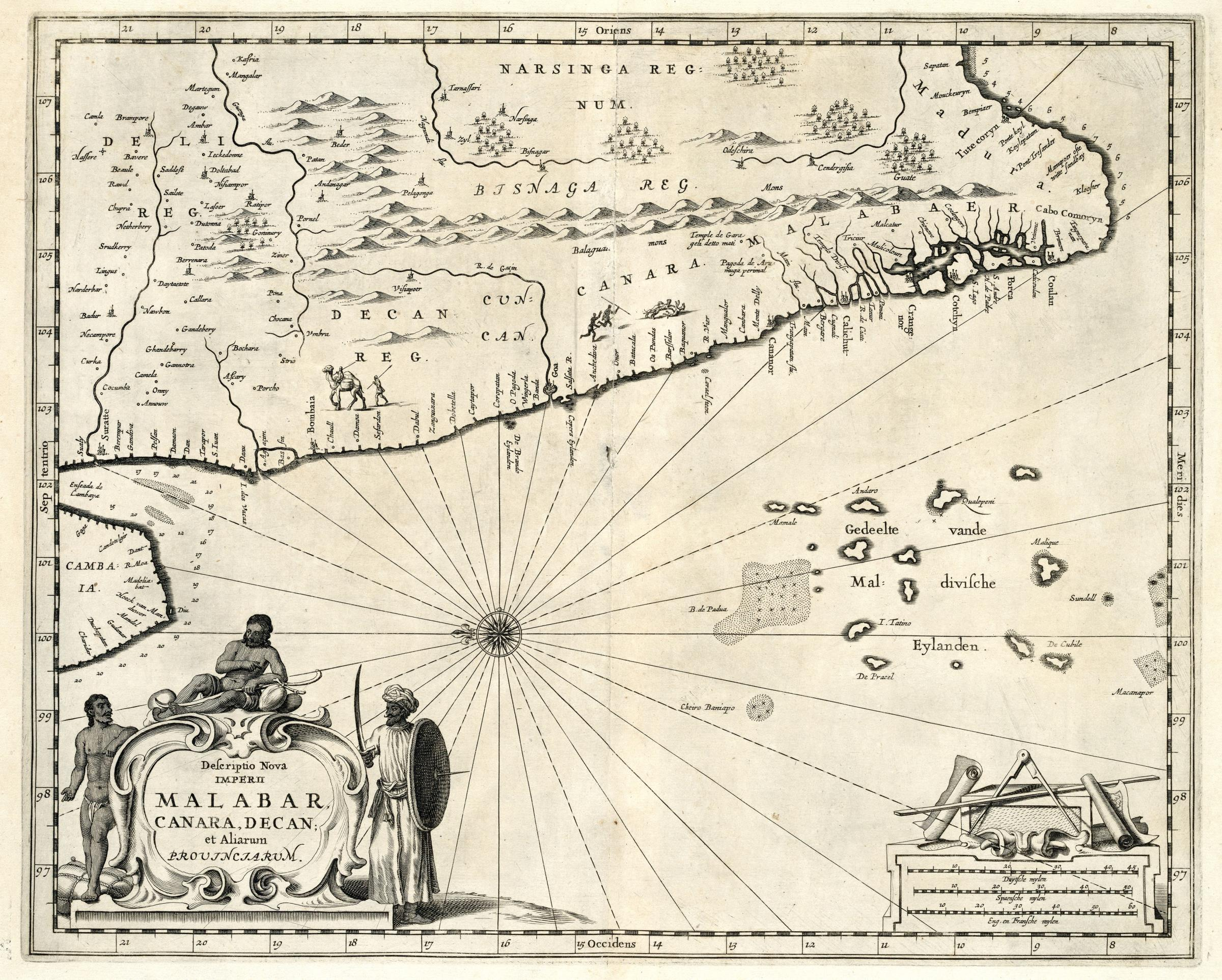
Map of the Malabar Coast, circa 1672.

India was far from unknown to the Jewish merchants of the Middle East. Since ancient Rome the caravan route from India had ended in Aleppo and the spice trade had tied Basra, Yemen and Cairo to the Malabar Coast. However, it was Persian-speaking Jewish merchants, close trading allies of the Jews of Baghdad, Basra and Aleppo Jews who first struck into the Indian heartland.

As adventurers, mystics and merchants, they had been venturing to India since the Middle Ages on the back of invasions of the subcontinent launched by Persian speaking rulers from what is now Iran and Afghanistan. Both Persian and Mughal sources record Jewish traders following the 16th century Mughal invasion of India launched by Emperor Babur.

They rose to be traders and courtiers of the Mughals. Jewish advisors at the Court of Akbar the Great in Agra played a significant role in Akbar's liberal religious policies. In Delhi, the syncretic Jewish mystic Sarmad Khasani was tutor to the Crown Prince Dara Shikoh before both were executed by Aurangzeb. There were sufficient Jews in Mughal lands for British travelers to report that synagogues had been established there, but of which no trace or Jewish record remains. These handful of Jews never established a permanent community but left legends and pathways for future settlers from Arabic speaking lands.

Records of Jewish tradesmen traveling from Baghdad can be found from the early 17th century. These trading outposts and emerging migrant communities also saw Jews become courtiers to Mughal rulers. These merchants wandered widely across the subcontinent. Shalom Cohen, who would found the Calcutta community, was the court jeweller to the Nawab of Awadh and travelled to Punjab where he held the same title at the court of Ranjit Singh the leader of the Sikh Empire. Cohen, the Calcutta community would later recall, was even given the honour of riding with the Nawab of Awadh on his personal elephant.

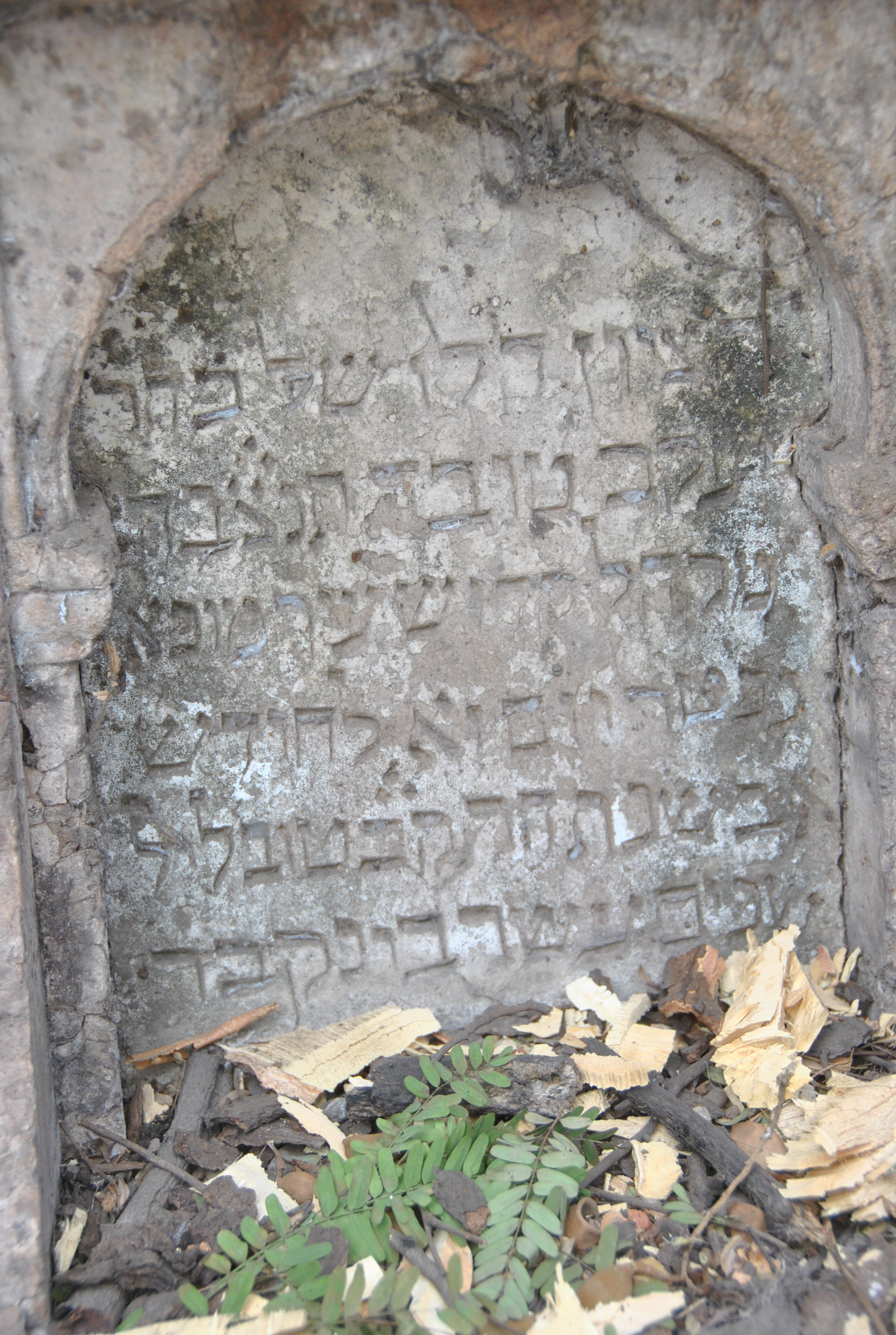
A Baghdadi Jewish grave in Surat, Gujarat

The first permanent Baghdadi merchant colony in India was established in 1730 in Surat, after the British East India Company had begun trading with Basra in 1723. In the early 18th century, trade between Basra and Surat grew whilst the Indian port was the main base of the British East India Company until it decamped to Bombay. Joseph Seemah from Baghdad opened the Surat synagogue and cemetery in 1730. The Baghdadi community in Surat grew and by the end of the 18th century, as many as 100 Jews from Baghdad, Aleppo and Basra made up the Judeo-Arabic speaking merchant colony of Surat. This was to become the first of a string of Baghdadi communities stretching from Bombay to Kobe be established in Asia.

But it was around the early 19th century, in response to the tyrannical rule of Dawud Pasha, the Ottoman governor of Baghdad, who persecuted, extorted and imprisoned the leading Jewish families of the city, that whole clans started crossing the Indian Ocean to seek safety and fortune in Asia. Dawud Pasha's misrule was when Baghdadi immigration towards Bombay and Calcutta became strong with the leading Sassoon, Ezra and Judah families departing for India. This episode of persecution was the beginning of the Baghdadi Jewish diaspora with records of whole clans departing the city for Bombay, Calcutta, Aleppo, Alexandria and Sydney.

Jewish life in the ancient communities of the Middle East, had taken a turn for the worse in the mid-19th century. The pogrom and forced conversion of the Jews of Mashhad in 1839, the fear sown by three blood libels in Aleppo between 1841 and 1860, and the outbreak of plague, first striking Baghdad in 1831, then returning with vengeance to Basra and Baghdad in 1841, encouraged Jewish clans in the declining Ottoman Empire to seek their fortunes elsewhere.

== Colonial Asia ==
As Jews, primarily from Baghdad, Aleppo and Basra came to India as traders in the wake of the Portuguese, Dutch and British, what became known as the Baghdadi communities (a name that masks their diverse roots in Baghdad, Aleppo, Damascus, Basra, Yemen and elsewhere) grew fast. By the middle of the 19th century, trade between Baghdad and India was said to be entirely in Jewish hands. Within a generation Baghdadi Jews had established manufacturing and commercial houses of wealth, most notably the Sassoon, Ezra, Elias, Belilios, Judah and Meyer families.

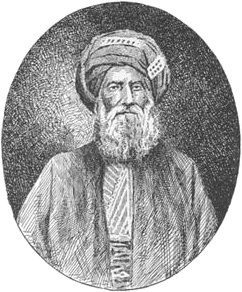
David Sassoon, 1792–1864.

With the rise of British power in India, Surat declined in importance as British-controlled Calcutta and Bombay became more important in trade. Baghdadi settlement shifted first to Bombay and then principally to Calcutta, then the capital of British India and the centre of the jute, muslin, and opium trades. Jewish merchants from Aleppo, traditionally the end of the historic caravan route from India, played an important role in founding the Calcutta Jewish cemetery, which was opened in 1812.

Spurred by the immigration of some the leading Jewish families of Baghdad fleeing the persecution of Dawud Pasha, the first synagogue, replacing a small prayer room, was opened in 1823, and with the community expanding quickly a second followed in 1856. By the end of the 19th century, more than 1,800 Baghdadi Jews were living in Calcutta. In 1884, a third synagogue, which was to be the largest in Asia, was dedicated in Calcutta. Baghdadi Jews were also living and trading in Chinsura and Chandernagore outside Calcutta.

The rise in prominence of Calcutta during the colonial era coincided with the rise of opium trade with China. The East India Company established a monopoly over the sale of Indian opium in 1773, actively promoting the export of opium to China, defying prohibitory legislation from the Qing government. Baghdadi Jewish merchants dominated the opium trade with a majority of opium chests auctioned from the colonial authorities being exported to China by Baghdadi Jewish merchants, who competed with Marwari and Parsee merchants for the trade. The Sassoon family eventually controlled 70 percent of the opium trade from India. Great fortunes were also made in the indigo, silk and muslin trade with Dhaka where Baghdadi Jews partnered with Bengali Muslim merchants.

Around these booming concerns, the Baghdadi Jewish communities of India began to take shape, both seeking and attracting Jewish immigrants from across the Middle East to work for them. Following the shift in the centre of British rule from Bombay to Bengal the Baghdadi community of Bombay initially lagged that emerging in Calcutta. This fortunes of the community were reversed when David Sassoon and his family arrived in 1833.

Sponsored by the Sassoon family, the first synagogue opened in 1861 and the second in 1888. Distinct from Calcutta, whose settlement was principally Iraqi Jews and Syrian Jews, the Baghdadi Jewish community in Bombay drew significant Jewish immigration from Persian-speaking communities in Afghanistan, Bukhara and Iran as well Jewish families from Yemen. Jewish migrant were attracted from across the Middle East to work in the factories and business concerns of the Sassoon family. Outside Bombay a Baghdadi community was established in Poona where a synagogue, a school and hospital was established by David Sassoon and a Hebrew printing press was in operation. A Baghdadi presence is also recorded in Madras.

Animated map showing the movement of Baghdadi Jews across South and East Asia

From India, the community expanded to Burma, and the ports of Singapore, Hong Kong and Shanghai. These were established along the opium route that ran between India and China. In Singapore the elders of the community were initially the sons of Ezekiel Judah of Calcutta. Meanwhile, the earliest Baghdadi Jew to settle in Burma was Azariah Samuel who arrived in the port of Sittwe on the Bay of Bengal in 1841. Around the same time two brothers Judah and Abraham Raphael Ezekiel settled in Mandalay and worked as bookkeepers for the Burmese royal court. From 1880 the community was permanently established, the trading success of other Baghdadi Jews in opium, teak, jute, and trading shops, attracted other Baghdadi Jews to Mandalay and communities sprang up in Rangoon and Pathein.

Following the ban on the opium trade in the early twentieth century Baghdadi Jewish merchants invested in cotton and jute products as staple exports. The sudden spike in demand for jute sandbags, building blocks for the trenches on the Western Front (World War I), made great fortunes amongst the Jewish merchants of Calcutta.

At their heights, the communities of Bombay and Calcutta were at the heart of a communal kinship network linked by the ports of the Indian Ocean and South China Sea. One observer described the Baghdadi Jews communities as being "almost as familiar with each other as the Jews of Manchester are with Liverpool." The engines of the Baghdadi Jewish trading network were tightly knit family firms such as David Sassoon and Co or the Meyer Brothers, founded by Sir Manasseh Meyer, with offices and agents established by family members in the each port of the network.

Before World War II there were upwards of 11,000 Baghdadi Jews in Asia. On the eve of war the Baghdadi population in Calcutta had reached 3500 and in Bombay 3000. Across the Bay of Bengal in Burma, both Rangoon and Pathein elected Baghdadi Jewish mayors and the Baghdadi Jewish population peaked at 2500 Jews in the 1930s. However, not all the Baghadi Jewish communities of this era were permanently established with the Judeo-Arabic speaking community in Sydney established by families fleeing Dawud Pasha disbanding its congregation in the 1890s.

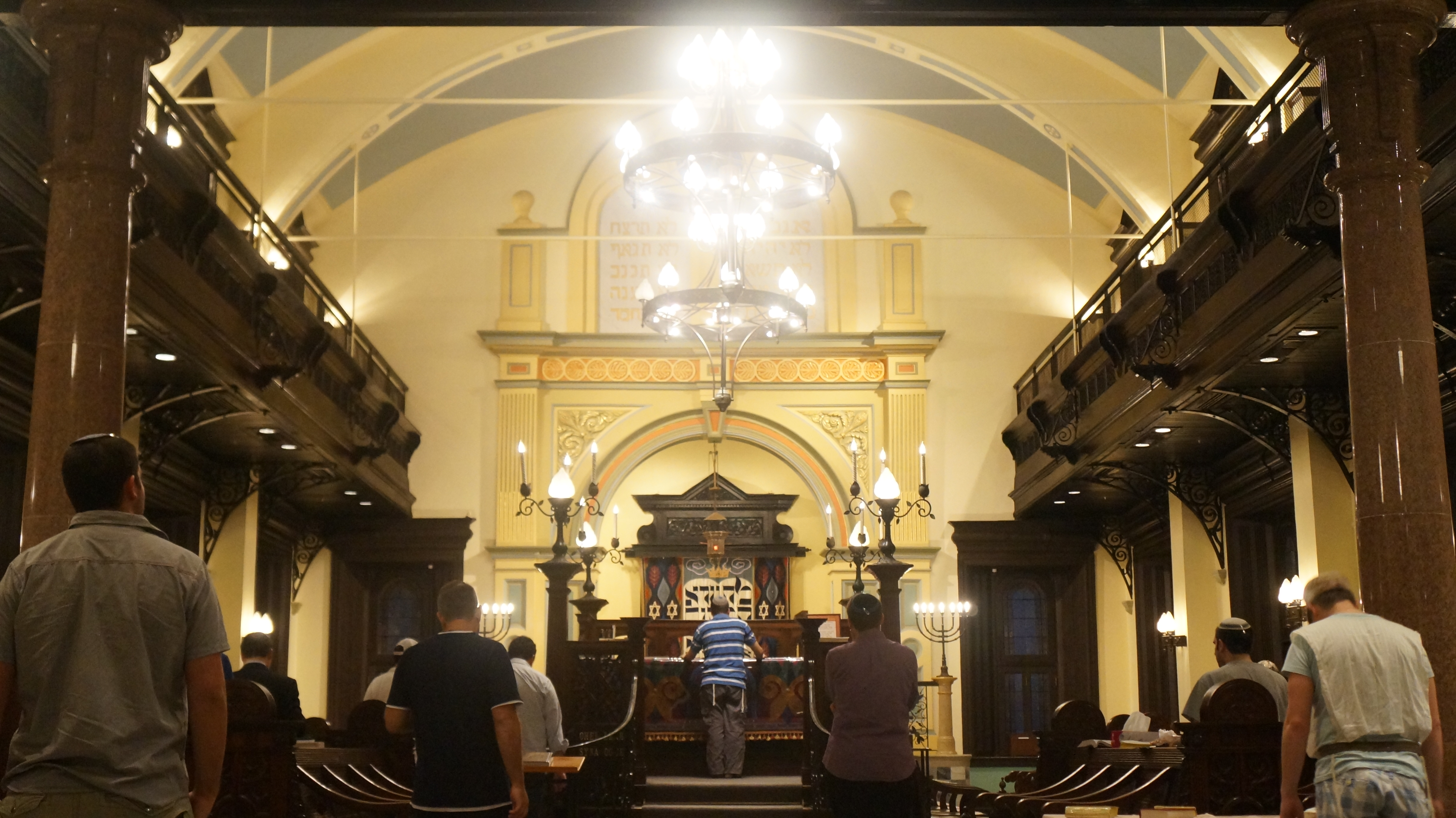
Ohel Leah Synagogue, an originally Baghdadi synagogue in Hong Kong

Those communities established beyond British India by Baghdadi Jews flourished during the British Empire and peaked in population shortly before the Second World War at 1500 in Singapore, 1000 in Shanghai, and 150 Hong Kong prior to the Second World War. The Singapore community flourished under the leadership of Sir Menasseh Meyer and the Hong Kong community under the influence of E. R. Belilios. Both were opium merchants who engaged in significant philanthropic efforts establishing schools and synagogues. Baghdadi outposts are also recorded as having been established in Canton and Tientsin.

Whilst Singapore, Hong Kong and Shanghai were the only Baghdadi settlements to genuinely grow into large communities, beyond a small trading outpost, tiny portside settlements existed in Malaysia, Indonesia and Japan, as satellites of the stronger communities in India, Burma, Singapore and China.

On the route between India and Singapore, a tiny Baghdadi community was in Penang, with a synagogue and Jewish cemetery, was established in the 1870s, but for most of its history never exceeded 50 families. Further south from Singapore, in Indonesia, then the Dutch East Indies, a tiny Baghdadi community of spice merchants was established in Surabaya in Java in the 1880s.

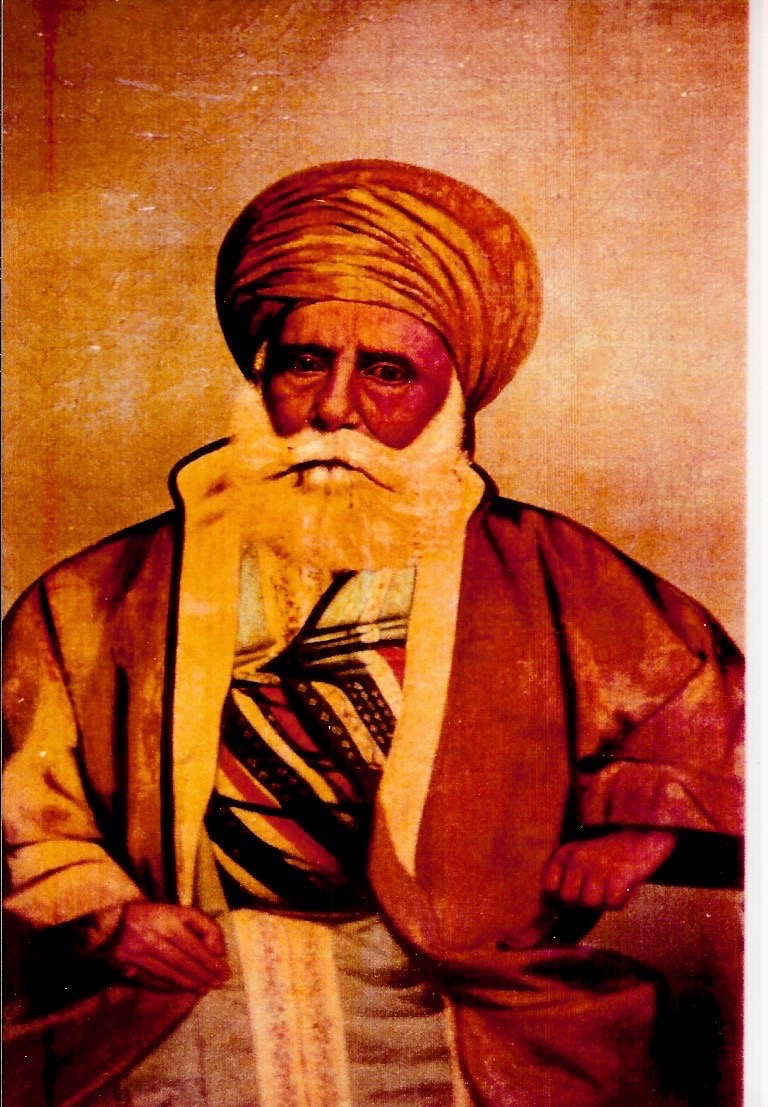
David Joseph Ezra, Baghdadi Jewish merchant and community leader of Calcutta, late 19th century.

The most far flung Baghdadi outposts, never numbering more than fifty families, were established in Japan at the furthest reaches of the opium route. Baghdadi Jews from Iraq, Syria and Egypt, initially drawn to man the concessions of David Sassoon established tiny footholds in Nagasaki, Yokohama and Kobe. The only Baghdadi synagogue in Japan, uniting small prayer groups, was Ohel Shelomoh opened by Jews from Aleppo in 1912. Initially established in Nagasaki and Yokohama, the Baghdadi traders relocated to Kobe, which became its focal point, after an earthquake in 1923.

As imperial jurisdictions consolidated, the Baghdadi Jews found themselves in a liminal situation in colonial Asia. They were considered neither Indian nor Western, Asian nor European and partnered with both Western and Indian interests. Legally they lived in limbo, their citizenship often unclear, having inherited what was an early modern political order.

Prior to the First World War the Baghdadi Jews were for the most part notionally subjects of the Ottoman Empire. Starting from 1870 the communal leaders began aggressive lobbying with British colonial authorities to registered as European. This was never granted to them. Nor was admittance, with few exceptions, to the European-only clubs that were the center of life in the European colonial societies throughout Asia. Baghdadi Jews were denied access to European electoral rolls in India. Outsiders, and insiders, they clung fiercely to their Jewish identity.

Beyond India, Baghdadi Jews sought the legal status of French or British Protected Person in China. With few exceptions for the wealthiest individuals, this was routinely denied by British government officials. Angst over their legal status grew in the run up to World War II.

As a result, the Baghdadi Jews were determined to prove themselves a loyalist community to British authorities throughout the colonial period. Baghdadi Jewish merchants operated as confidential agents of the East India Company, offered aid to British soldiers during the 1756 incident known as the Black Hole of Calcutta, and like many foreign and Indian merchants and maharajas made substantial donations to the British military during the so-called 1857 Indian Mutiny. God Save The Queen, was sung in the honour of the far off imperial sovereign in the schools founded by David Sassoon, who himself never spoke English.

== Baghdadi culture ==
The Baghdadi Jews, whilst spread across continents, operated a network of kinship and trust throughout the trading posts of the Indian Ocean. They were closely united by religious, language and family ties. Marriage, in particular, tied the Baghdadi communities together. Brides, and occasionally grooms, would be sent from one community to another. Business would often overlap with family ties, creating strong alliances. Synagogues, schools, and special funds, fastened a support networks sponsored by wealthy merchants. This kinship network meant Judeo-Arabic communities, typically established by fellow Jewish migrants from the same families and clans the Middle East, which sprang up in Burma, Singapore, Malaysia and China, were tightly woven into the Baghdadi community.

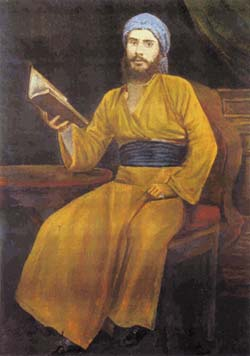
Rabbi Shlomo Twena of Calcutta, 1885–1913.

The life of the Baghdadi kinship network on the opium route is best seen in the case of Sir Manasseh Meyer. He was born in Baghdad in 1846 and received his primary education of Calcutta, his secondary education in Singapore, before returning to Calcutta to learn bookkeeping and then moving to Rangoon, Burma, to established a small business. From there he returned to Singapore, established an import-export business, based on an opium monopoly with India. He was knighted in 1906 for his services to Singapore having sponsored the building of two synagogues and large scale real estate construction. However, throughout all his movement, he remained firmly within a Judeo-Arabic speaking Baghdadi network.

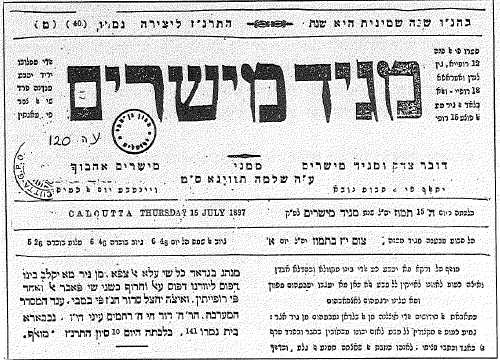
Maggid Mesharim, a Calcutta Judeo-Arabic newspaper, 1890–1901.

Within these Baghdadi communities, the majority were of Iraqi Jewish origin, but families from Syria, Yemen, Egypt, Afghanistan, Iran and a handful of Sephardic Jews from Italy and Turkey joined and assimilated into the Baghdadi community. For most, it was simply as eastern expansion to closely bound patterns of transnational Jewish kinship, trade and exchange that had existed for centuries, moved out of the Middle East and the Mediterranean into colonial Asia. Within the Middle Eastern Jewish world, the Baghdadi Jews were considered adventurers and entrepreneurs.

Quite unlike Ashkenazi Jews departing for America, who were typically poor and scorned by their religious elders for doing so, the Mizrahi Jews who departed for India included some of the leading Jewish families of Baghdad, and were looked up as admired figures, patrons, and sponsors of religious life back in Iraq. Both the Sassoon family, which settled in Bombay no later than 1832, and the Judah family, which left for Calcutta in 1825, were seen as the leading Jewish families of Baghdad. Ezekiel Judah, who founded two synagogues in Calcutta, was a descendant of Solomon Ma'tuk.

These great Baghdadi Jewish fortunes are deceptive, however, when it comes to what life was like for the overwhelming majority of the community. Far from wealthy, they lived on the edge of poverty, as peddlers, stall holders, mill workers, rickshaw men and other such jobs. The middle class Jews speculated in opium and acted as brokers. Great distance existed between the leading Baghdadi Jewish families, such as the Ezra family and the Sassoon family, who grew ever richer and more British-oriented during this period, and the rest of the community. Politically, the Baghdadi Jewish resembled an oligarchy, with all power and authority to represent the community towards colonial authorities being vested in the leading families, as it had been traditionally in the Middle East.

Initially the Baghdadi Jewish communities that developed in India retained close cultural and religious links to Baghdad. Intellectual life was strong enough in the mid to late-19th century to sustain a printed press in India of the Baghdad Jewish dialect of Judeo-Arabic. Centered on Calcutta small Baghdadi Jewish publishing houses translated literary, historical, religious and anti-missionary tracts into Judeo-Arabic whilst religious texts were also printed in Hebrew. Baghdadi newspapers and periodicals in Judeo-Arabic, with some Hebrew portions, were also published in India. This Baghdadi printed press began in 1855: with the support of David Sassoon a periodical started in Bombay catering to the merchant elite of the community. This was joined by four other Baghdadi Judeo-Arabic newspapers and periodicals in Calcutta. Novels and literature from the European Zionist and Haskala movements were translated into Judeo-Arabic in Calcutta. At the turn of the 20th century, Jewish intellectual life in Calcutta appears to have waned.

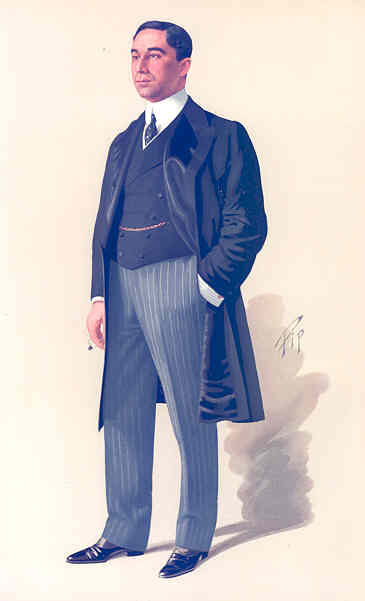
Raphael Emanuel Belilios, born in Hong Kong and later established in Britain, 1881–1922.

In the 20th century Baghdad declined, and the British Empire became more important to the Baghdadi Jews. The wealthier Baghdadis adopted European clothes and sought British education for their children whilst the poorer Baghdadis, especially women, continued to wear Arabic dress. The rise in British education and working in the British Empire resulted in Baghdadi Jews turning to English as their first language, both for international trade and cultural prestige in India. In the 20th century the Baghdadi Jews wanted to assimilate into colonial European society and be considered culturally and ethnically European. Aside for religious observances, the Baghdadi Jews began to adopt elements of Western European lifestyles. But the Baghdadis remained marginal to colonial European society and were excluded for the duration of the Raj from many social clubs that limited admission to Europeans.

Such Westernization resulted in the closing of all Judeo-Arabic publications in India by the start of the 20th century. These were succeeded in Calcutta in the 1920s and 1940s by three English-language communal newspapers sympathetic to Zionism. Whilst many of the wealthiest Baghdadi families remained aloof from Zionism in the late 19th and early 20th century, the community's middle class established Zionist associations in Bombay and Calcutta.

Religiously the Baghdadi Jews did not train their own rabbis but sought guidance and resolutions on matters of Jewish law from the rabbis of Baghdad, preserving the traditions and rituals of Iraqi Jews. Sermons up until the First World War were given in Judeo-Arabic, after which the use of English became predominant. After the First World War, the Baghdadi Jews began to refer their religious questions to the Sephardic Chief Rabbi in Britain. Rites concerning circumcision, betrothal, and protections of the newborn preserved Iraqi Jewish customs. Baghdadi Jewish wedding celebrations gradually grew less Middle Eastern and more European in style in the 20th century.

Throughout this period, the leading Baghdadi Jewish families set themselves up as sponsors of Jewish religious life in the Middle East. Across Syria and Iraq, schools, synagogues, yeshiva and charitable foundations were supported by Baghdadi Jewish merchants of Bombay and Calcutta. Struggling communities across the Middle East sought the support of patrons in Asia such as when Moise Sassoon of Calcutta was called upon to by Lebanese Jews to sponsor the construction of the Magen Avraham Synagogue of Beirut. Almost all these works were destroyed after the starts or the Israeli-Arab conflict brought about the flight and expulsion of these ancient Jewish communities in Arab lands. Today only the Porat Yosef Yeshiva in Jerusalem, founded by donations from the Baghdadi Jews of Calcutta, survives.

== Postcolonial decline ==
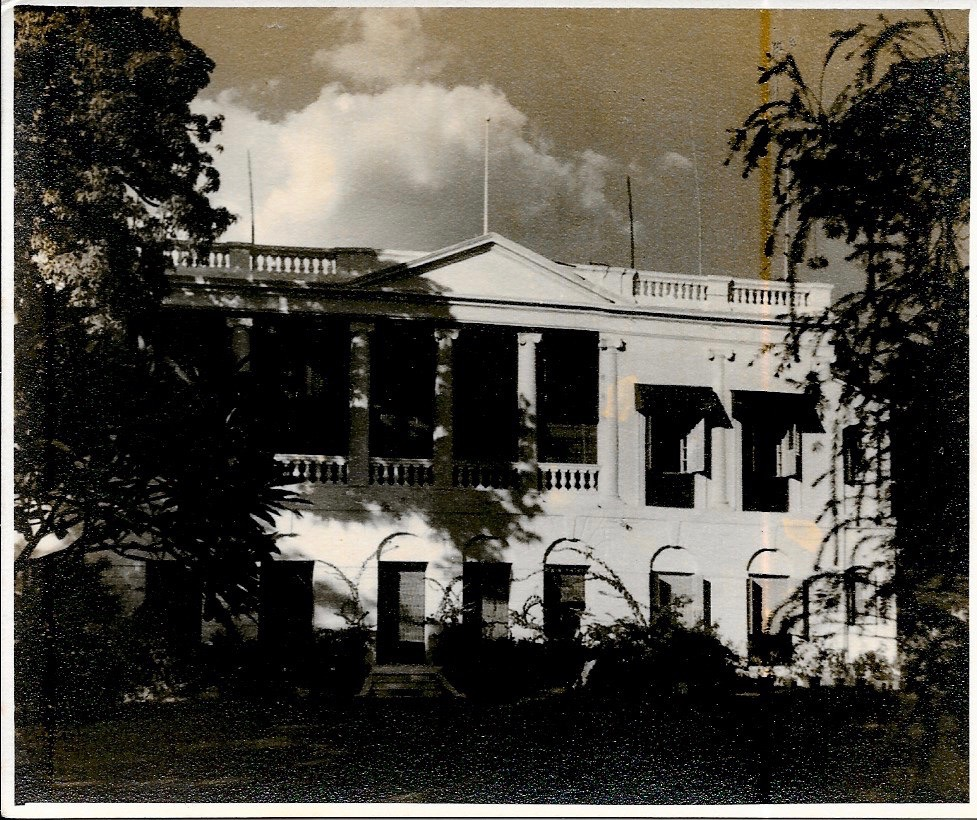
The home of Moise Abraham Sassoon in Calcutta. One of the grand residences of the Baghdadi Jewish merchant elite in the early 20th century.

As the Second World War saw most of the Baghdadi Jews of Burma, as well as individual families from across Asia, flee from the Japanese Occupation of Burma, the Jewish population of Calcutta, the heart of the Baghdadi network, swelled with refugees to over 5,000 strong. A small number of Jews fled the 1941 Farhud pogrom in Baghdad for Bombay. Even some of the leading Baghdadi Jewish families who had settled in Britain chose to return to India as the Holocaust began the slaughter of European Jews. Despite India offering this place of refuge, the Second World War was the beginning of the end for old Baghdadi world.

The Japanese occupation of Burma, Shanghai, Hong Kong, Singapore and Indonesia saw much of the Baghdadi community interned by the Japanese army. As the war ended, it was miraculously revealed to the rest of the Baghdadi world that in Japan itself, Rahmo Sassoon, leader of the tiny Baghdadi Jewish community of Kobe, had skillfully negotiated with Japanese authorities to ensure no Jews were harmed during World War II. Despite this, the one Baghdadi synagogue of Japan, in Kobe was burnt down during an American air raid.

At the heart of the Baghdadi world, in India, the end of the war ushered in the implosion of the old order. At this point, ethnic strife, political violence and fear of civil war were widespread in India on the eve of Indian Independence. The violent explosion of killings and refugees following the Partition of India exacerbated the Baghdadi fears for the future. Dislocated by war, with many fearing India and Burma would become communist or hostile to business not in Indian hands or Burmese hands once the British left, the Baghdadi community began to leave Asia. Meanwhile, in the Middle East the establishment of the state of Israel and the outbreak of the Arab–Israeli conflict saw the start of the Jewish exodus from Arab and Muslim lands. In Iraq, pushed by official intimidation persecution, almost the entirety of the ancient Iraqi Jewish community had left for Israel by 1950.

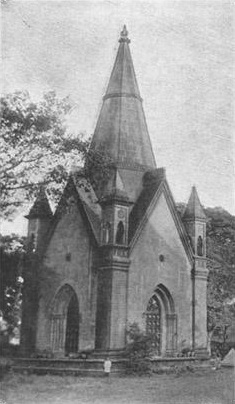
David Sassoon tomb in Pune, India.

First the leading families, then the rest of the community began to emigrate on mass. This began a continuous exodus from Bombay and Calcutta. The wealthier followed the path of the Sassoon family to Britain, whilst the poorer were drawn to the new state of Israel or the easing of immigration restrictions in Australia. Bombay and Calcutta were the heart of the Baghdadi world, the centers of trade, culture and communal life. Once these had fallen into decline, the outlying communities followed.

Postwar the imperial system and open borders that had made the transnational Baghdadi world possible disappeared. In Shanghai, communist victory in the Chinese Civil War in 1949 closed the trading links community depended upon. Those that has fled the Japanese occupation chose not to return. By 1950, the community had all but vanished. Meanwhile, In Hong Kong, despite the benign conditions of British rule, emigration saw Baghdadi Jewish numbers fall to less than 70 by the 1960s.

In Burma, independence in 1947 similarly imposed trade barrier and a nationalistic regime in which the Baghdadi Jews felt they had little place. In Singapore, with trade to China, India and Burma blocked, and the Jewish community had shrunk to as low as 180 by the 1960s.

A final wave of emigration, pushing the much reduced communities in India and Burma to virtual extinction, was triggered by a wave of post-colonial nationalizations and trade restrictions in India and Burma in the 1960s. Elections in West Bengal saw a government dominated by the Communist Party of India (Marxist) take power in Calcutta in 1967. Nationalizations of legacy firms established during the colonial rule and currency restrictions saw a choking of economic life and the Baghdadi community shrink from 500 to under 100 by the 1970s. Meanwhile, nationalizations in Burma the 1960s saw the closing of synagogues and the last Rabbi leaving the country in 1969.

Despite this precipitous decline and dispersal of the Baghdadi Jewish communities, a handful of individual Baghdadi Jews would play pivotal roles in Asia's newly independent states. The first Chief Minister of Singapore David Marshall was a Baghdadi Jew. In India, Lieutenant General J. F. R. Jacob, a Baghdadi Jew from Calcutta, won national fame as Major General and chief of staff of the Indian army that defeated the Pakistan Army in East Pakistan in the Bangladesh Liberation War of 1971, later serving as governor of the Indian states of Goa and Punjab.

The Baghdadi community, however, never saw their exodus as a tragedy. Memoirs written by Baghdadi Jewish authors spoke fondly Burma, Singapore, Shanghai and Hong Kong and of the fact in India they had never experienced antisemitism, which was viewed as a unique treasure. The network of Baghdadi Jewish schools, both English, Jewish and aspirational in orientation had primed them for life in Britain or Israel, not in post-colonial Asia. Rather that focus on what pushed, these memoirs focus on what pulled the Baghdadi Jews to leave Asia, chiefly a sense that the opportunities that had drawn their ancestors there had dried up, and new glittering prizes lay in the West.

In the early twenty first century the Baghdadi communities of India and Burma are at the point of disappearing completely. However small Baghdadi communities of Hong Kong and Singapore have endured and Baghdadi synagogues still operate in both cities, though now greatly outnumbered in both by Jews from especially the United States, Israel, France and the United Kingdom draw to business in contemporary Asia.

Today synagogues and associations upholding Baghdadi Jewish traditions exist in Britain, Israel, Australia and the United States. But in the historic Baghdadi communities in Asia only the synagogues originally founded by Baghdadi Jews in both Hong Kong and Singapore continue to operate regular services.

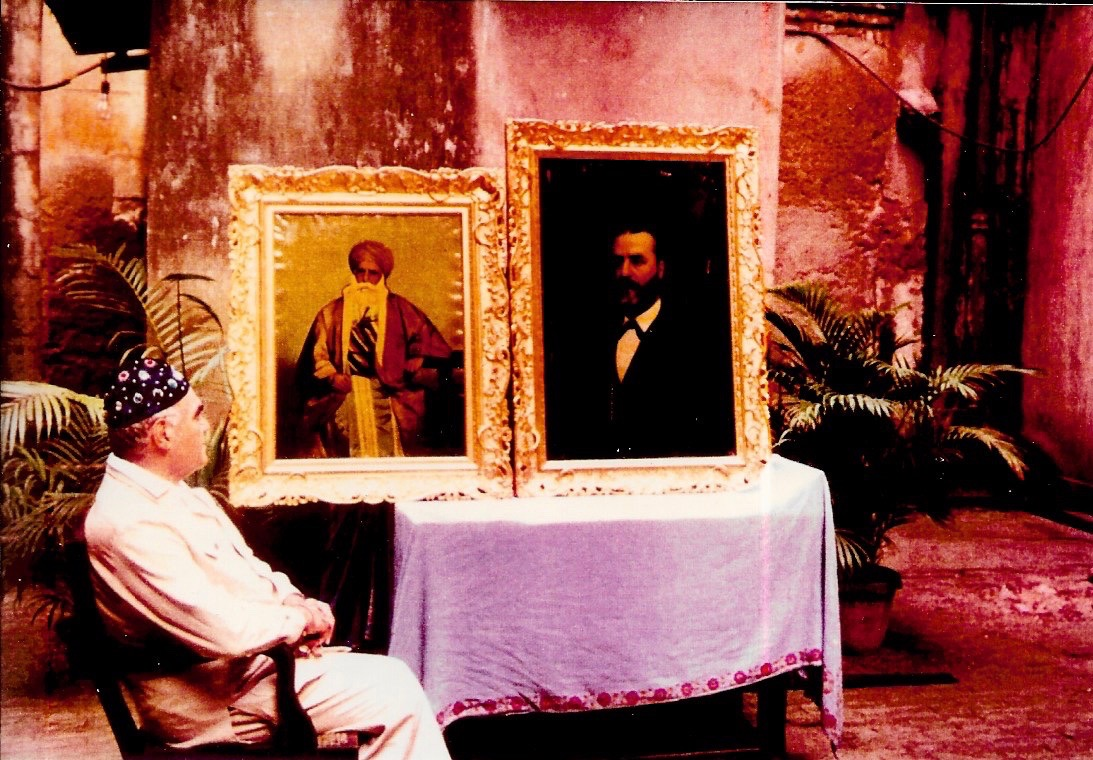
A Baghdadi Jewish man in Calcutta contemplates his heritage. Late Twentieth Century.

Families of Baghdadi Jewish descent continue to play a major role in Jewish life particularly in Great Britain, to which the leading families were drawn after the Second World War. Established in London, the Sassoon family enjoyed the friendship of Edward VII, established a baronetcy and saw Philip Sasson became a minister. Meanwhile, other Baghdadi families such as the Reubens have played major role in the British economy whilst others have gained notable prominence in arts and journalism, such as Gerry Judah and Tim Judah.

A Jewish Heritage Museum, established in Baghdad on the site of the former Shamash School in October 2026, funded by expatriate Jews of Iraqi descent, provides archival materials and recorded interviews highlighting the history of a community that had accounted for 25% of Baghdad's population in the 20th century

== Cuisine ==
Traditional Baghdadi Jewish cuisine is a hybrid cuisine, with many Arab, Turkish, Persian and Indian influences. Famous Baghdadi dishes include beef curry, Baghdadi biryani and Baghdadi Jewish parathas. A Baghdadi version of tandoori chicken is also popular (using lemon juice to cook the chicken instead of the cream used in the usual Indian recipe). Other Baghdadi Jewish communities in Southeast Asia mixed their original Iraqi Jewish dishes with influences from the local cuisine.

== Synagogues ==
Pre-World War Two Baghdadi Communities in Asia

City	Synagogue	Year opened
Mumbai	Knesset Eliyahoo	1884
Mumbai	Magen David	1864
Kolkata	Magen David	1884
Hong Kong	Ohel Leah	1902
Penang	Penang Synagogue	1926; Closed 1976
Pune	Ohel David	1867
Shanghai	Ohel Rachel	1921
Singapore	Maghain Aboth	1878
Singapore	Chesed El	1905
Yangon (Rangoon)	Musmeah Yeshua	1896
Yangon (Rangoon)	Beth El	1932; closed by the end of WWII

Post-World War Two wider Baghdadi and Iraqi Jewish Diaspora.

City	Synagogue	Year opened
London	Ohel David Eastern Synagogue	1959
Los Angeles	Kahal Joseph Congregation	1959
New York	Congregation Bene Naharayim	1983
New York	Babylonian Jewish Center	1997
Sydney	Beth Yisrael Synagogue	1962

=== In Baghdad ===
- Meir Taweig Synagogue
- Shaykh Yitzhak Tomb
- Great Synagogue of Baghdad

== Notable Baghdadi Jews ==
- Sassoon Eskell
- Yosef Hayyim (Ben Ish Chai)
- David Abraham (executive), CEO of Channel Four.
- Esther Victoria Abraham, Indian model and actress.
- Shalom Obadiah Cohen, community leader and founder of the Jewish community in Calcutta.
- Sassoon J. David, banker (founder of Bank of India) and member of the Bombay Municipal Corporation.
- Brian Elias, composer.
- Eli Amir, writer
- Edward Isaac Ezra, opium trader and real estate developer.
- Sasson Gabai, Israeli actor of Baghdadi Jewish descent
- Brian George, Israeli-born character actor of Baghdadi-Indian Jewish descent; most well known for playing the role of a Pakistani shop owner, "Bhabu", on Seinfeld, US TV series.
- Silas Aaron Hardoon, real estate tycoon.
- Abraham Hillel, rabbi.
- David and Simon Reuben, tycoons.
- Shelomo Bekhor Hussein, rabbi and publisher.
- Joe Balass, filmmaker
- Lt Gen J. F. R. Jacob, Indian military commander in the Bangladesh Liberation War of 1971; former Governor of Goa and Punjab.
- Gerry Judah, artist and designer.
- Tim Judah, journalist and historian.
- Mel Judah, poker player
- Lord Kadoorie
- Anish Kapoor, British Asian sculptor; Baghdadi Jewish mother
- David Saul Marshall, the first Chief Minister of Singapore
- Nadira, Bollywood actress
- Linda Menuhin, Iraqi-born Israeli journalist
- Ruby Myers, Bollywood actress.
- Albert Abdullah David Sassoon, merchant
- David Sassoon, merchant and founder of the Sassoon family.
- Sassoon David Sassoon, English merchant.
- Gaby Dellal, film director
- Alan Yentob, television presenter and executive
- Samantha Ellis, writer
- Philip Sassoon, British politician and staff officer during World War I
- Siegfried Sassoon, English poet during World War I, grandson of David Sassoon.
- Abraham Sofaer, actor.
- Jael Silliman, feminist scholar and historian.
- David Mordecai, photographer.
- Abraham David Sofaer, former federal judge for the United States District Court for the Southern District of New York, Scholar at the Hoover Institute and Legal Adviser to the United States State Department.
- Nahoum Israel Mordecai, founder of Nahoum & Sons bakery, Kolkata, India.

== See also ==
- Jewish ethnic divisions
- History of the Jews in Iraq
- Indian Jews
- Jews of Kolkata
- Baghdad Arabic (Jewish)
- David Sassoon
- Asian Jews
- British Asians
- Indian Americans
- Judeo-Malay
