= Sassoon baronets =

Set index for Sassoon baronets

There have been two baronetcies for the surname Sassoon, both in the Baronetage of the United Kingdom. Both are extinct.

- Sassoon baronets of Kensington Gore and of Eastern Terrace (1890)
- Sassoon baronets of Bombay (1909)
