= Society of Engineers (United Kingdom) =

The Society of Engineers was a British learned society established in 1854. It was the first society to issue the professional title of Incorporated Engineer. It merged with the Institution of Incorporated Engineers (IIE) in 2005, and in 2006 the merged body joined with the Institution of Electrical Engineers to become the Institution of Engineering and Technology.

== History ==
=== Establishment ===
Established in May 1854 in The Strand, London, the Society of Engineers was one of the oldest professional engineering bodies in the United Kingdom (after the Smeatonian Society of Civil Engineers, 1771, the Institution of Civil Engineers, 1818, and the Institution of Mechanical Engineers, 1847)

It promoted the interests of members worldwide and was concerned with all branches of engineering. It was founded by Henry Palfrey Stephenson and Robert Monro Christie as a means of reunion for former students of Putney College (the short-lived College for Civil Engineers, 1839–c.1851) — one of few institutions then giving technical and scientific training for engineers — with Stephenson serving as president in 1856 and 1859.

=== Timeline ===
- 1839 – College for Civil Engineers founded
- 1854 – Society of Engineers (SoE) founded
- 1884 – Junior Institution of Engineers founded
- 1976 – Junior Institution of Engineers renamed the Institution of Mechanical & General Technician Engineers (IMGTechE)
- Early 20th century – Association of Supervisory Electrical Engineers (ASEE) founded
- 1928 – Cumann na nInnealtoiri (The Engineers Society) is founded in Ireland
- Early 20th century – Institute of Engineers and Technicians (IET) founded
- Mid 20th century – Institution of Incorporated Executive Engineers (IIExE) founded
- Mid 20th century – The Institution of Electronics and Radio Engineers (IERE) founded
- 1965 – Institution of Electrical and Electronics Technician Engineers (IEETE) founded, incorporating ASEE (with support from the IEE)
- 1965 – The Society of Electronics and Radio Technicians (SERT) founded by amalgamation of IERE with Radio Trades Examination Board (RTEB). SERT then supported RTEB renamed as the Electronics Examination Board (EEB)
- 1969 – A number of Corporate Members of the Society of Engineers founded on the 27 October 1969 The Society of Professional Engineers (SPE) that maintains a register of Engineers who have proved their competence and can be accurately described as Professional Engineers and who on Registration can use the designation "P.Eng.";
- 1969 – The Institution of Civil Engineers and Cumann na nInnealtóirí merged to form the Institution of Engineers of Ireland, now known as Engineers Ireland.
- 1978 – The Institution of Technician Engineers in Mechanical Engineering (ITEME) founded (with support from IMechE)
- 1982 – The IMGTechE and ITEME merged to form the Institution of Mechanical Incorporated Engineers (IMechIE)
- 1982 – IEETE renamed the Institution of Electrical and Electronics Incorporated Engineers
- 1990 – IEEIE and SERT merged to form the Institution of Electronics and Electrical Incorporated Engineers (IEEIE)
- 1998 – IEEIE, IMechIE and IET merged to form the Institution of Incorporated Engineers in electronic, electrical and mechanical Engineering (IIE)
- 1999 – IEExE merged with IIE
- 2001 – IIE granted royal charter and renamed the Institution of Incorporated Engineers (IIE)
- 2004 – Institute of British Engineers (IBE) wound up
- 2005 – EEB wound up
- 2005 – Society of Engineers merged into IIE. The merger ensured continued recognition of the society as its members retained their post nominal letters (MSE or MSEng), and securedg a broader membership base for the IIE.
- 2006 – IIE and IEE (Institution of Electrical Engineers) joined to form the Institution of Engineering and Technology (IET).
- 2018 – SPE absorbed into IET
- 2019 – The Society of Environmental Engineers (SEE) wound up

The IET now has more than 150,000 members worldwide, and incorporates all members of the Society of Engineers.

== Membership ==
=== Examinations ===
To become a member the candidate was subjected to an examination divided into three parts:

- Part I: General Engineering
- Part II: Design Paper (Civil, Structural, Mechanical, Electrical/ Electronics Project).
- Part III: Management

=== Membership qualifications ===
- ASE: Associate Engineering (Non-Corporate Member)

minimum age 21 years, a qualification BTEC, HND, HNC or GNVQ/NVQ/SNQ Level 4 in engineering or similar approved qualification and 3 years of engineering training. Pass Part I of SoE's Exams.

- AMSE: Associate Member (Non-Corporate Member)

minimum age 23 years, ASE plus CertEng or BEng / BSc or GNVQ / NVQ / SNVO Level 5 in engineering or similar approved qualification and 5 years of engineering training /experience including 2 years practical or site work. Pass Part II of SoE's Exams.

- MSE: Member (Corporate Member)

minimum age 26 years AMSE plus DipEng or BEng(Hons)or similar approved qualification or MEng with approved project study at a participating university and 5 years engineering training/experience including 2 years practical or site work plus holding a position of professional responsibility for at least 3 years. Pass Part III of SoE's Exams.

Sample of the Membership Certificate: The sensible data of the holder have been deleted for privacy reasons.

- http://www.slideshare.net/slideshow/embed_code/38172939

See slides 7-42-43-44 http://www.authorstream.com/Presentation/aSGuest141513-1498327-technicians-engineers-challenges-possibilities/ The Society of Professional Engineers-SPE (UK) is a direct emanation of the Society of Engineers ( 1969 ). See links at the bottom of the page.

- FSE: Fellow (Corporate Member) - No Direct Entry

minimum age 33 years, Corporate Members of at least 7 years standing, who in the opinion of the Membership Elections Committee endorsed by the directors are deemed to have had sufficient experience (including major responsibility in the design, research or execution of engineering works) and who can also demonstrate continued career development. Services rendered to the society in particular or to the profession of engineering generally are also taken into account.

- HonFSE: Honorary Fellow (Corporate Member) - No Direct Entry

Honorary Fellows shall be persons of distinguished position or scientific attainments nominated and elected by the directors who shall consent to become members of the society.

=== Notable members ===
The society has had a number of notable engineers among its membership and in receipt of its awards which include the Churchill Medal. On 27 November 1946, at the House of Commons, Sir Winston Churchill became an Honorary Fellow and approved the use of his name for the society's senior award. Another Honorary Fellow was radio pioneer Sir Guglielmo Marconi.

Churchill Medal recipients have included Sir Frank Whittle for jet engine design, Sir Christopher Hinton and Sir John Cockcroft for their work on atomic energy, Sir Geoffrey de Havilland for aircraft design, Sir Bernard Lovell for radio astronomy and Alan Wells for the Wells wave turbine.

== Past presidents ==
- 2004 Allan Cooper Wright
- 2003 S John C Gale
- 2002 David McLaren
- 2001 David W Purnell
- 1999 Brian Rhys Masterston
- 1998 Alan D Crowhurst
- 1997 Alan D Crowhurst
- 1996 John H Wilkinson
- 1995 Dennis F B Gibbard
- 1994 Eric S Long
- 1993 David McLaren
- 1992 Thomas Kenneth-Duncan
- 1991 T E Geldart
- 1990 J H Roderick Haswell
- 1989 Iain Cooper Wright
- 1988 Iain Cooper Wright
- 1987 Alan John Curzon
- 1986 Raymond Charles Yarnell
- 1985 David Vaughan Richards
- 1984 Victor Charles Ealey
- 1983 Charles Kenneth Haswell
- 1982 Colin Cruickshanks Bates
- 1981 John Alfred Gardner
- 1980 David John Hardcastle
- 1979 Richard Charles Wykes
- 1978 Albert Edward Witchlow
- 1977 Peter Michael Rex Olley
- 1976 Thomas Morgan Scanlon
- 1975 John David Burrows
- 1974 The Earl of Ilchester
- 1973 Douglas John Ayres
- 1972 Stanley Nash Bruce Gairn
- 1971 Brian Joseph Bell
- 1970 Frank Wilsenham Hyde
- 1969 William Godfrey Taylor
- 1968 Leo Giulio Culleton
- 1967 Robert Carey
- 1966 Gilbert Robert Charles Bunn
- 1965 Charles Leslie Nichol Laing
- 1964 Donald William Tull
- 1963 Donald William Tull
- 1962 John Charles Maxwell-Cook
- 1961 William Edward Humphrey
- 1960 Eric Godfrey Massey Collier
- 1959 Iain Cyril Cocking
- 1958 Robert Clark
- 1957 Edward Charles Lejeune
- 1956 Captain Harry Francis Jackson
- 1955 Henry George Taylor
- 1954 Walter Robert Howard
- 1953 Gerald Norman Swayne
- 1952 Ronald Samuel Vernon Barber
- 1951 Paul Sison Ham
- 1950 Cyril Lett Boucher
- 1949 Edward Sugden Waddington
- 1948 Ernest Edward Turner
- 1947 Victor Stephen Wigmore
- 1946 Albert Edward Turner
- 1945 Frank Parfett
- 1944 Frank Parfett
- 1943 Edward John Spiller Lamport
- 1942 Sir Henry Percy Maybury
- 1941 Sir Henry Percy Maybury
- 1940 Sir Henry Percy Maybury
- 1939 Sir Henry Percy Maybury
- 1938 H Bentham
- 1937 Bateman Brown Tarring OBE
- 1935 Hervey Carlton Hawkins
- 1934 Arthur Marinus Alexander Struben OBE
- 1933 James Douglas Haworth
- 1932 Frederick William Mackenzie-Skues
- 1931 Harry William Towse
- 1930 William Marrow Beckett MBE
- 1929 Archibald Kirkwood Dobbs
- 1928 Charles Henry James Clayton
- 1927 Douglas Charles Fidler
- 1926 Gerald Otley Case
- 1925 Archibald Stewart Buckle
- 1924 George Arthur Becks
- 1923 Arthur Marshall Arter
- 1922 Alfred Tony Jules Gueritte
- 1921 Lord Headley
- 1920 Burnard Geen
- 1919 Walter Noble Twelvetrees
- 1918 William Beedie Esson
- 1917 Henry Charles Adams
- 1916 Percy Griffith
- 1915 Norman Scorgie
- 1914 Henry Chawner Hine Shelton
- 1913 Arthur Valon
- 1912 John Kennedy
- 1911 Francis George Bloyd
- 1910 Diogo A Symons
- 1909 Edward John Silcock
- 1908 Joseph William Wilson
- 1907 Richard St George Moore
- 1906 Maurice Wilson
- 1905 Nicholas James West
- 1904 David Butler Butler
- 1902 Percy Griffith
- 1901 Charles Mason
- 1900 Henry O’Connor
- 1899 John Cory Fell
- 1898 William Worby Beaumont
- 1897 George Maxwell Lawford
- 1896 Samuel Herbert Cox
- 1895 William George Peirce
- 1894 George Abraham Goodwin
- 1893 William Andrew McIntosh Valon
- 1892 Joseph William Wilson Junior
- 1891 William Newby Colam
- 1890 Henry Adams
- 1889 Jonathan R Baillie
- 1888 Arthur T Walmisley
- 1887 Professor Henry Robinson
- 1886 Perry Fairfax Nursey
- 1885 Charles Gandon
- 1884 Arthur Rigg
- 1883 Jabez Church
- 1882 Jabez Church
- 1881 Charles Horsley
- 1880 Joseph Bernays
- 1879 Robert Paulson Spice
- 1878 Robert Paulson Spice
- 1877 Thomas Cargill
- 1876 Vaughan Pendred
- 1875 John Henry Adams
- 1874 William MacGeorge
- 1873 Jabez Church
- 1872 Jabez Church
- 1871 Baldwin Latham
- 1870 William Adams
- 1869 Frederick William Bryant
- 1868 Baldwin Latham
- 1867 William Henry Le Feuvre
- 1866 Zerah Colburn
- 1865 William Thomas Carrington
- 1864 Charles Llewellyn Light
- 1863 Robert Monro Christie
- 1862 Edward Riley
- 1861 James C Amos
- 1860 Rowland Mason Ordish
- 1859 Henry Palfrey Stephenson
- 1858 Robert Monro Christie
- 1857 George William Allan
- 1856 Henry Palfrey Stephenson
- 1855 No official president
- 1854 No official president

== See also ==
- Glossary of engineering
- Engineering ethics
