= Watson's Hotel =

Building in India

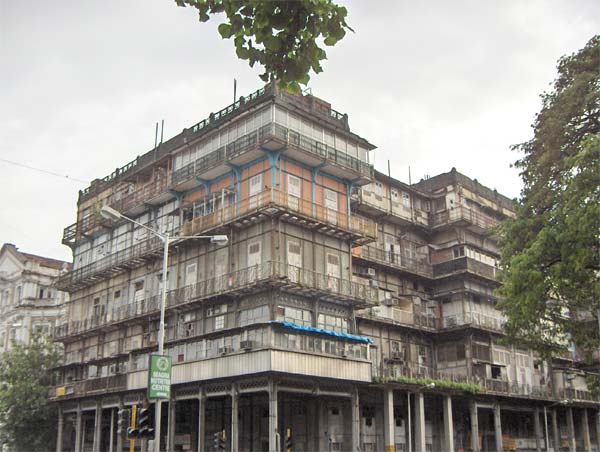
- Façade of Watson's hotel, now known as the Esplanade Mansion

- Location within Mumbai

General information
- Location: Mahatma Gandhi Road, Fort, Mumbai, India
- Coordinates: 18.9283°N 72.8311°E
- Construction started: 1867; 159 years ago
- Completed: 1869; 157 years ago
- Client: John Watson

Technical details
- Structural system: Cast iron

Design and construction
- Architect: Rowland Mason Ordish
- Engineer: Rowland Mason Ordish

UNESCO World Heritage Site
- Criteria: Cultural: (ii) (iv)
- Designated: 2018 (43rd session)
- Part of: Victorian Gothic and Art Deco Ensembles of Mumbai
- Reference no.: 1480

Watson's Hotel (actually Watson's Esplanade Hotel), now known as the Esplanade Mansion, located in the Kala Ghoda area of Mumbai (Bombay), is India's oldest surviving cast iron building. It is probably the oldest surviving multi-level fully cast iron-framed building in the world, being three years earlier than the Menier Chocolate Factory in Noisiel, France, which are both amongst the few ever built. Named after its original owner, John Watson, the cast and wrought iron structure of the building was prefabricated in England, and it was constructed between 1867 and 1869.

The hotel was leased on 26 August 1867 for the term of 999 years at a yearly rent of Rupees 92 and 12 annas to Abdul Haq. It was closed in the 1960s and was later subdivided and partitioned into smaller cubicles that were let out on rent as homes and offices. Neglect of the building has resulted in decay and, despite its listing as a Grade II–A heritage structure, the building is now in a dilapidated state. A documentary film about the building was made in 2019 called The Watson's Hotel.

== Design ==
Watson's Hotel was designed by the civil engineer Rowland Mason Ordish, who had worked on the Crystal Palace in London in 1850, and went on to design a number of cast - and wrought-iron structures such as bridges and market halls, notably the Albert Bridge in London the St Pancras Station station roof (co-designer). The building's cast iron and wrought-iron components were prefabricated by the Phoenix Foundry Company in Derby, England, and assembled on site. The iron frame is composed of relatively large-scale pieces, heavier than that used on the Crystal Palace, able to support the five levels, timber and tile floors, and the infill brick walling.

The design responded to the tropical environment by placing the access on external cantilevered walkways that surround the main facades, and by incorporating a large lightwell behind.

The Menier Chocolate Factory in Noisiel, France, designed by architect Jules Saulnier, is often credited as the first multi-story building with a structure entirely composed of cast-iron, but it was built slightly later, beginning in 1869, completed in 1872.

== History ==
John Hudson Watson was born in 1818 in Castle Carrock, England to a farming family, but moved to London in the 1840s and established a drapery business. Arriving with his brother and two sons in Bombay in 1853, they developed a successful drapery business. Buying plots 11 & 12 at the first auction of newly created Esplanade sites in August 1864, his original plan for the building was to use it as additional office and showroom for his thriving business nearby, but by late 1865 the plans had evolved into a luxury hotel, and he started to begin to ship prefabricated cast iron components from England as early as October 1865. According to the text on a painting commissioned by Watson's son in c1901 that now hangs at the Watson Institute in Castle Carrock, all elements including the cast iron, brick, stone and tiles, were imported. The hotel was built between 1867 and 1869, but interior work meant it did not finally open until 4 February 1871. By then, Watson had returned to England, where he died in May 1871, leaving his son John Watson Jr, to manage the hotel and drapery business. The original design, as displayed on the painting in the Watson Institute, included plans for traditional European mansard roof, however it was built as a simplified flat roofed form. The hotel was an exclusive Europeans-only business, and it was one of the most renowned hotels in the city in its day. The five-storied structure housed 130 guest rooms, as well as a lobby, restaurant and a bar at the ground level. The hotel also had a 30 by 9 metres (98 ft × 30 ft) atrium, originally used as a ballroom, with a glass skylight. At its peak, Watson's hotel employed English waitresses in its restaurant and ballroom, inspiring a common joke at the time: "If only Watson had imported the English weather as well."

Ownership appears to have been vested in Watson's wife, Hannah Maria Watson, who entered into a lease deed with Sardar Abdul Haq, Diler ul Mulk, and Diler ul Daula, for a term of nine hundred and ninety nine years on 26 August 1867.

John Watson Jr returned to England in 1896, and with competition from the grand Taj Mahal Hotel which opened in 1903, Watson's lost its premier status. In 1920, Watson's ceased to be a hotel, and had been renamed Mahendra Mansion. In 1944, it was renamed Esplanade Mansion, and in the 1960s it was partitioned into small cubicles and rented out as housing and offices. Having been owned by the Tatas, in the early 1980s it was sold to Sadik Ali.

Over the years, apathy toward the building by the occupants and owners resulted in the building decaying, the atrium was used as a dumping ground, there were several illegal alterations, and by 2005 it was in a seriously dilapidated state. One of the possible reasons was that the rent collected was low and could not be raised sufficiently due to rent stabilisation laws, and tenants were also protected. As of 2005, building had 53 families and 97 commercial establishments. Most of the commercial establishments are chambers of lawyers attached to the adjacent Bombay Civil & Session Courts and the nearby Bombay High Court.

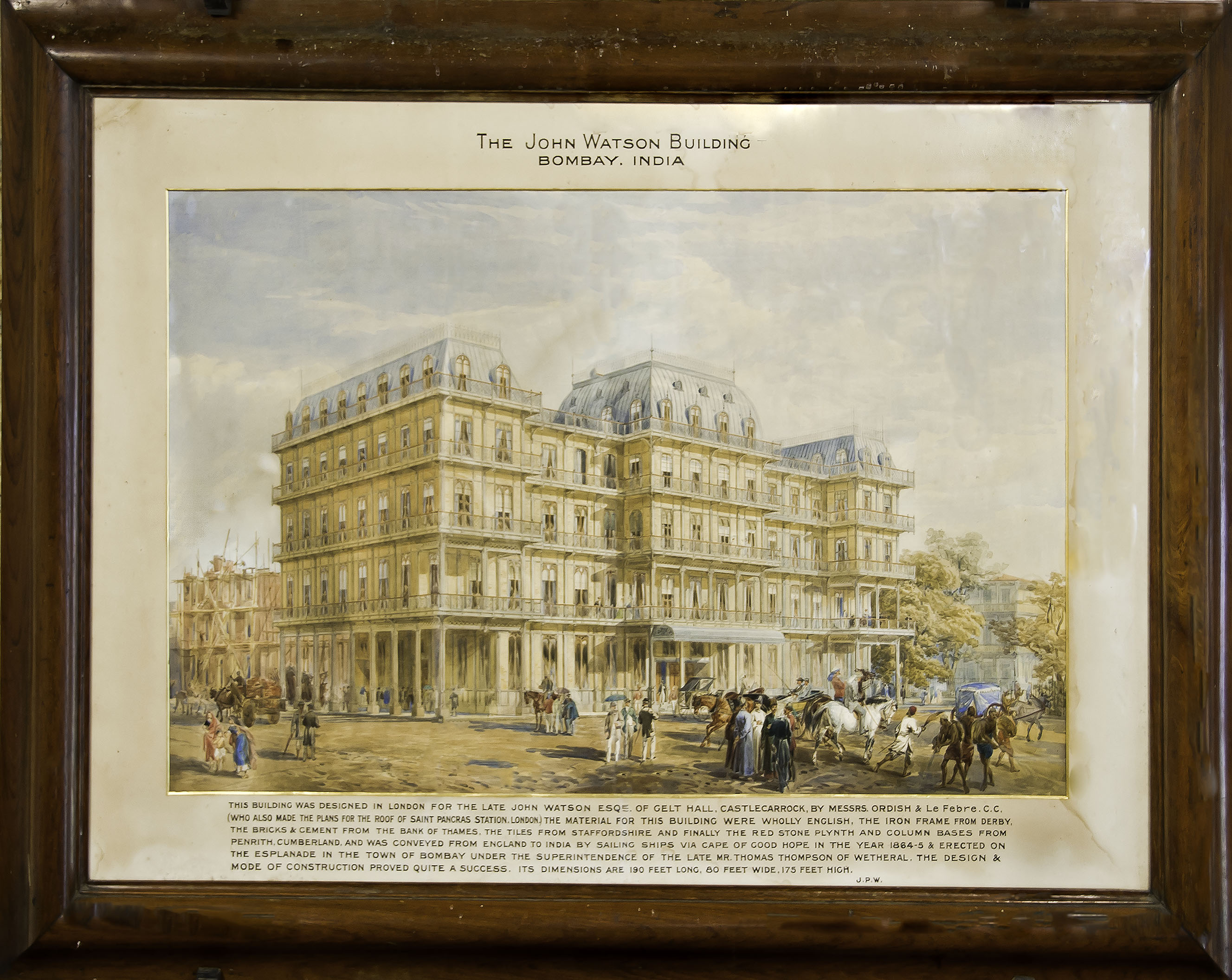
'The John Watson Building, Bombay India' . This painting showing the original design now hangs in the Watson Institute, Castle Carrock, England.

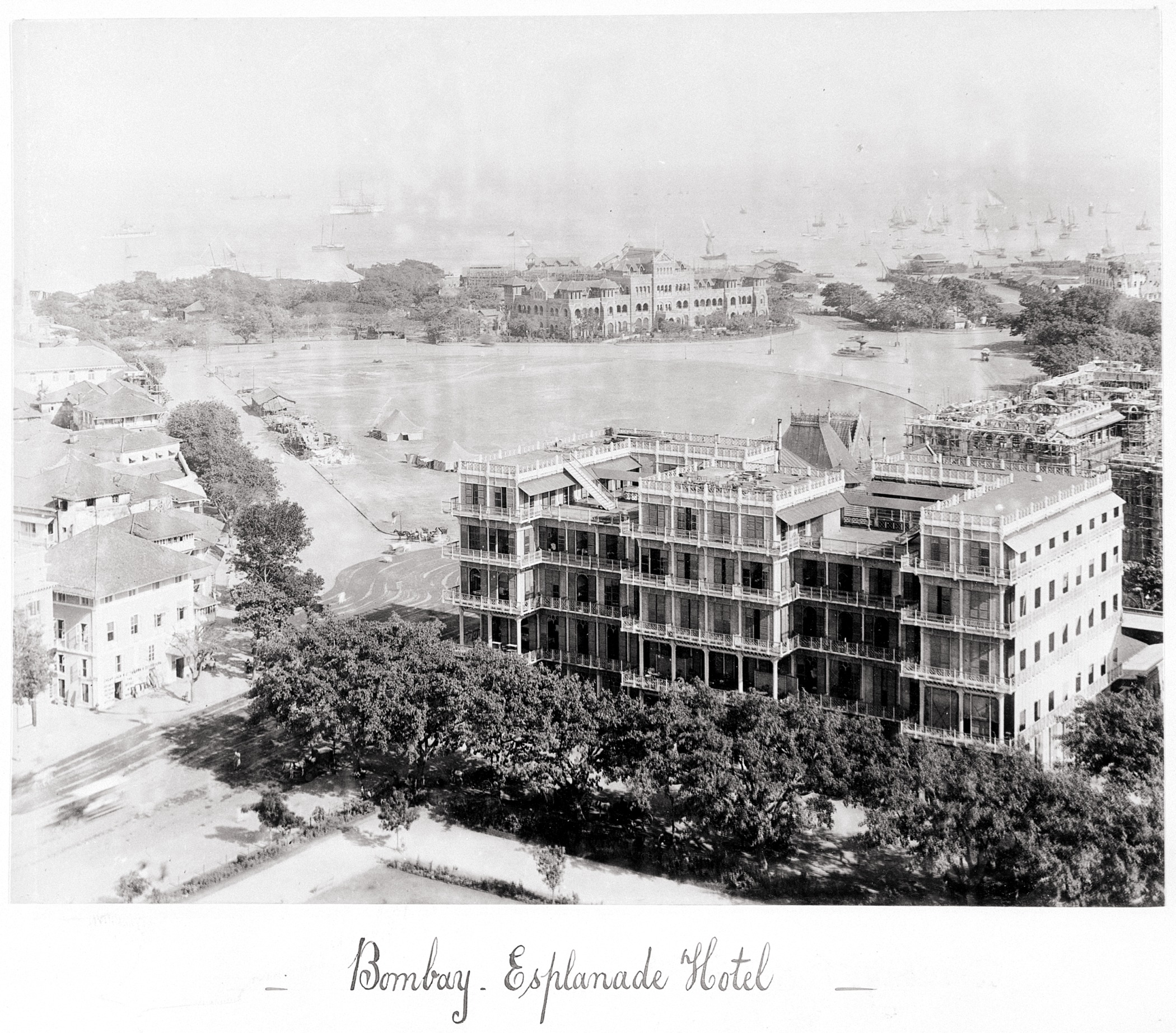
The hotel photographed in the 1880s-1900s.

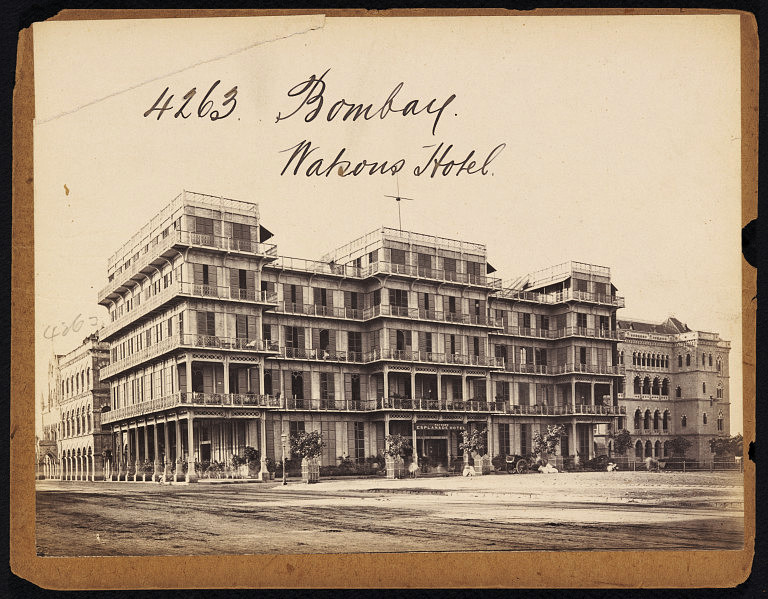
The hotel in the 19th century

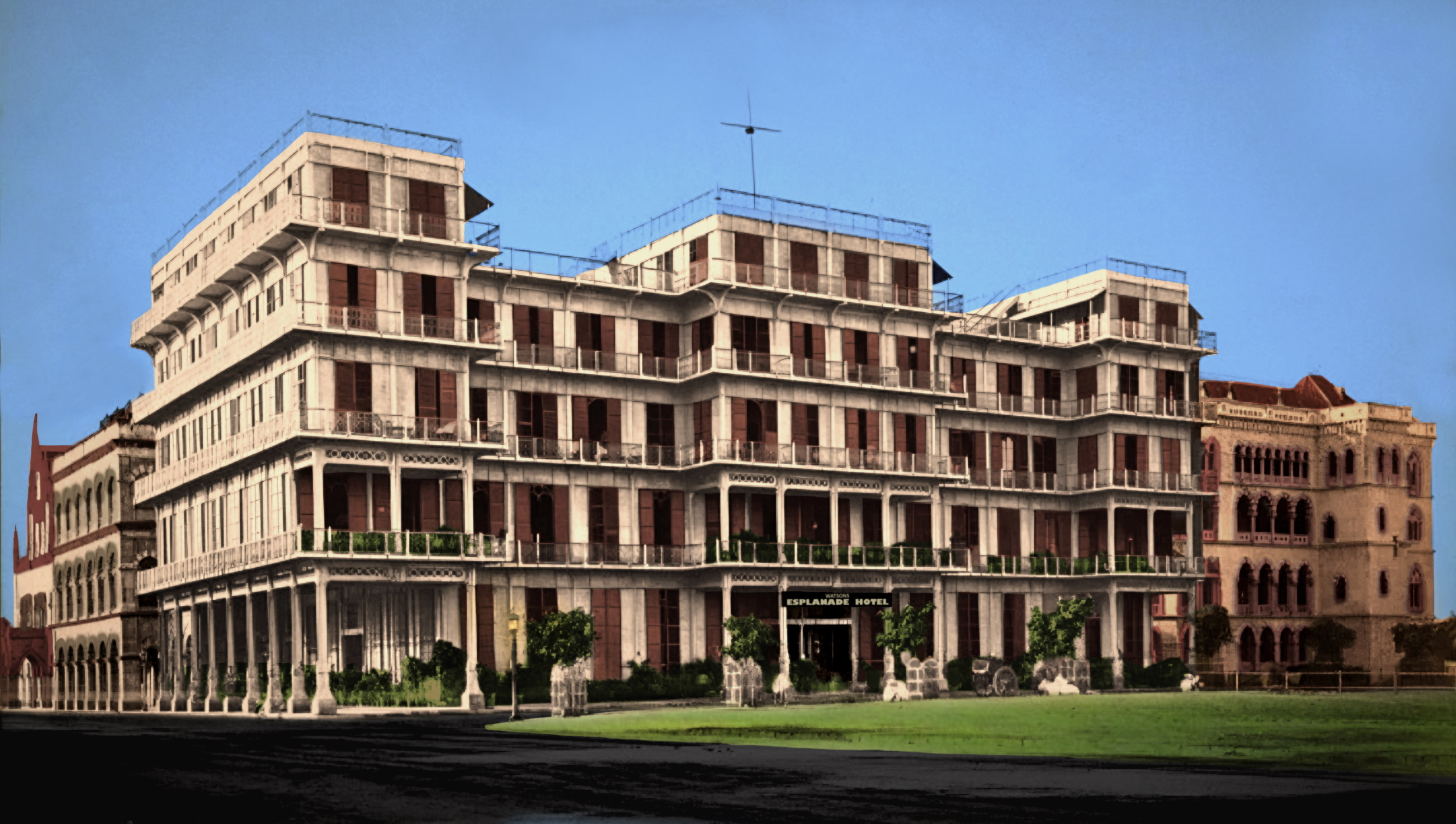
Restored and recoloured image of the hotel using period descriptions of its structure. Note the alterations to the terrace and wooden window panels, which differ from earlier paintings due to renovations.

=== Current state ===
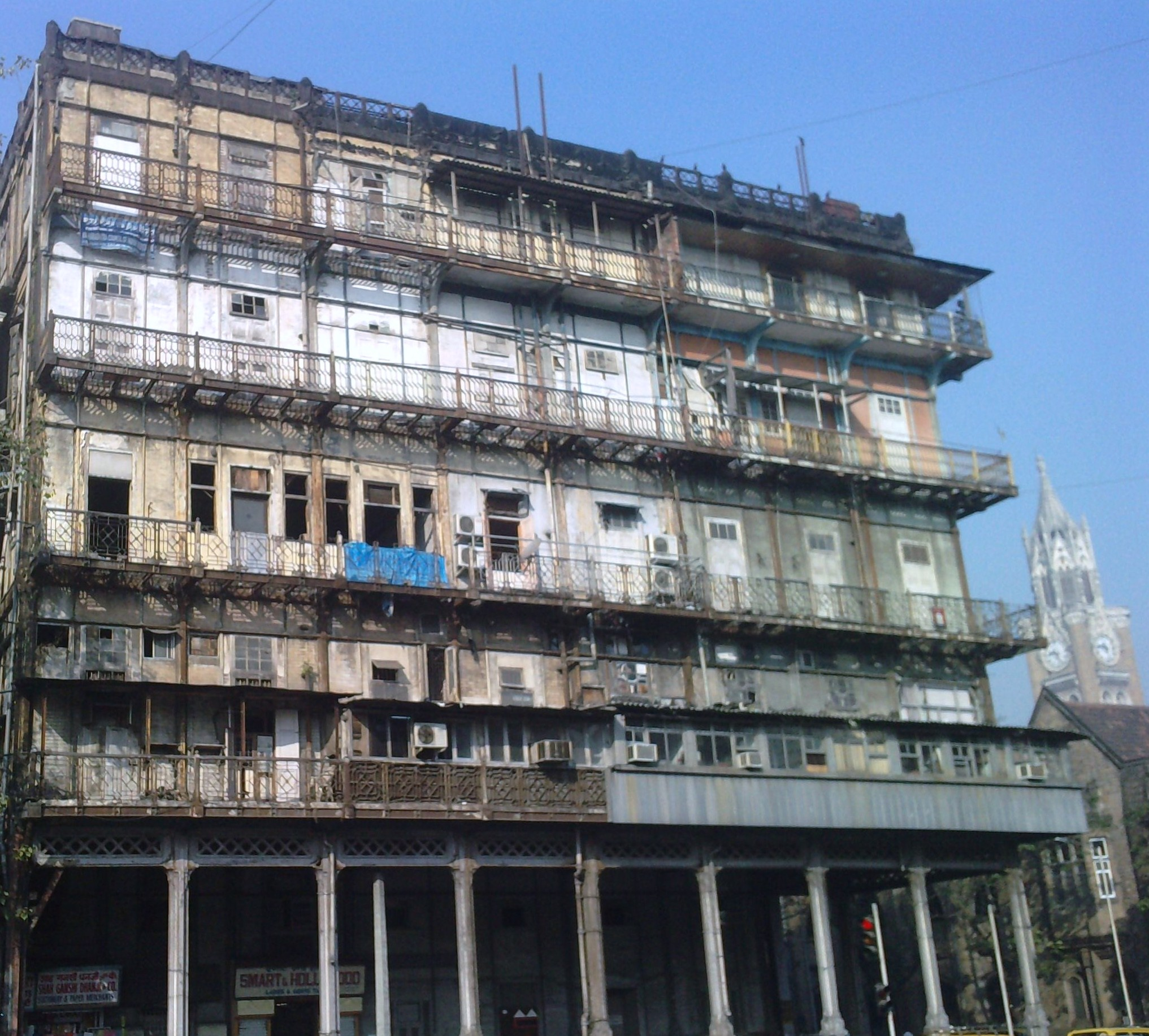
Esplanade Mansion c 2011 with Rajabai Clock Tower in the background

The building's poor structural condition has been commonly remarked, and efforts by heritage activists to persuade its present owner to invest in restoration have been unsuccessful. The current state of the building was publicized by Italian architect Renzo Piano, and as a result of his efforts, the building was listed in June 2005 on the list of "100 World Endangered Monuments" by the World Monuments Fund, a New York-based NGO. Just a few days after its nomination, part of the building's western façade, originally balconies developed into small offices, collapsed, killing one person and crushing several cars and motorcycles parked in the street below.

The building is listed as a Grade II–A heritage structure. On 13 June 2010, the Mumbai Heritage Conservation Committee (MHCC) gave its approval for the 130-year-old structure to be restored. The restoration work was to be paid for and carried out by the Maharashtra Housing and Area Development Authority (MHADA).

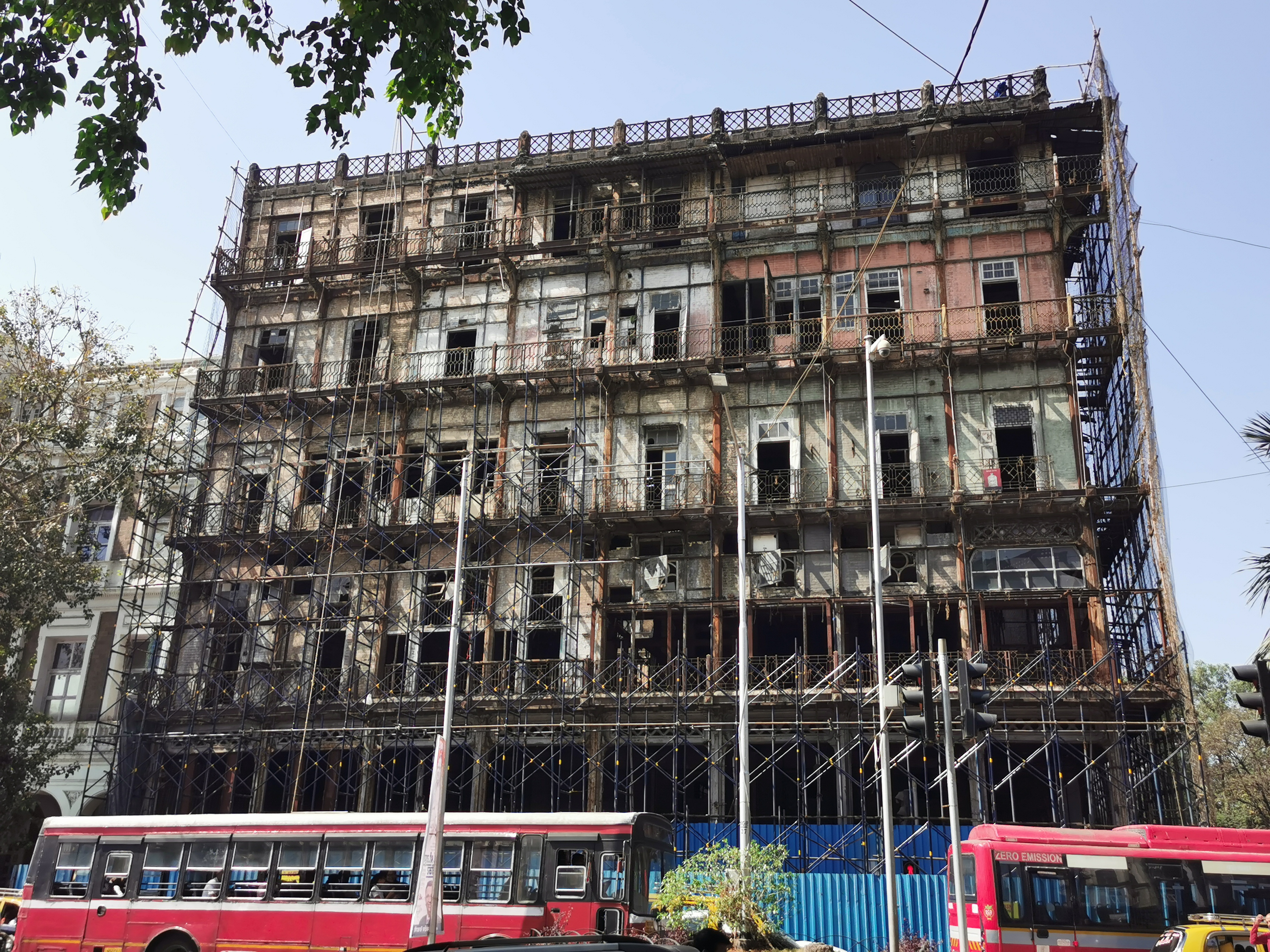
The hotel under scaffolding in 2024.

No action was taken until 2019 when MHADA sought advice on restoration from a panel from IIT, wherein they observed "Repairs will be dangerous as many structural elements of the building are not rigidly connected to each other.. it will be prudent to demolish Esplanade Mansion", a decision immediately decried by heritage advocates. Whether or not to restore the buildings, how it would be funded and the rights of the tenants have, were then subject of various court cases through 2020; an expert panel appointed by the court had determined by January 2020 that the building could and should be restored. In 2021, the restoration proposal was under consideration.

== Notable guests ==
Among the hotel's notable guests was Mark Twain, who wrote about the city's crows he saw outside his balcony in Following the Equator. It was also the first place in India to screen the Lumière Brothers' Cinematographe invention in 1896.

Muhammad Ali Jinnah used to play pool in the hotel, to make a little extra money for himself.

A popular myth surrounding the hotel was that the staff at Watson's Hotel denied Indian industrialist Jamsetji Tata access to the hotel. In retaliation he built the Taj Hotel, a hotel that stands near the Gateway of India, in 1903. However many historians, notably author Sharada Dwivedi, dispute this legend on the basis of a lack of evidence to prove that "Tata was a man of vengeance".

== See also ==
- Cast-iron architecture
- United States Capitol dome constructed using cast iron
