= Church of St Andrew and St Columba =

Church in Mumbai, India

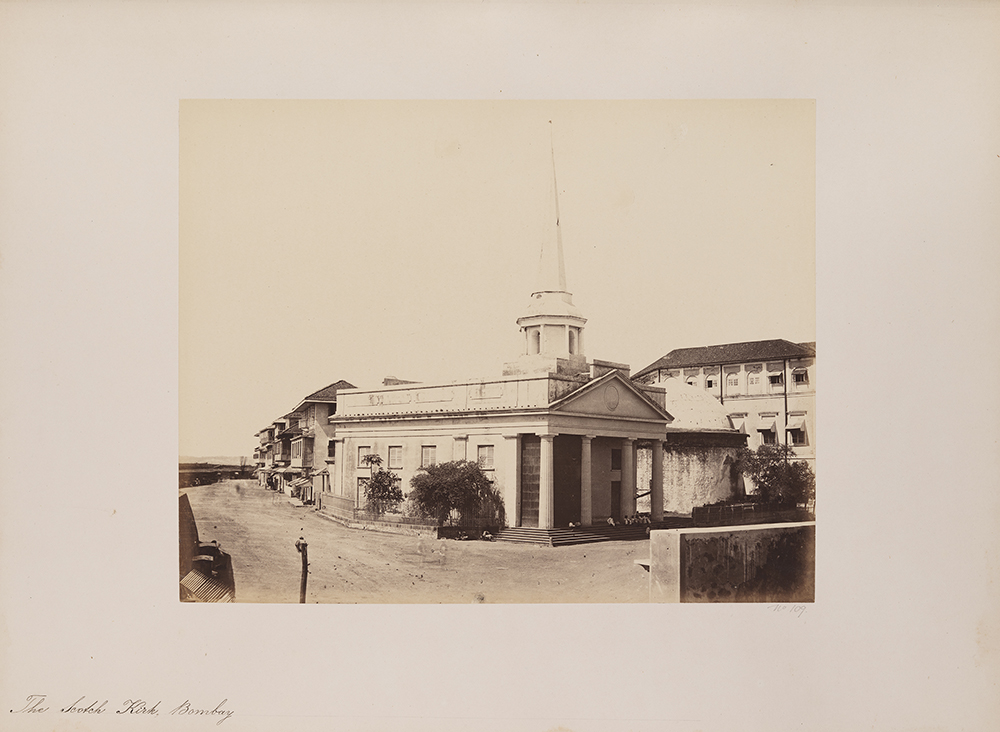
Church of St Andrew in the late-1850s.

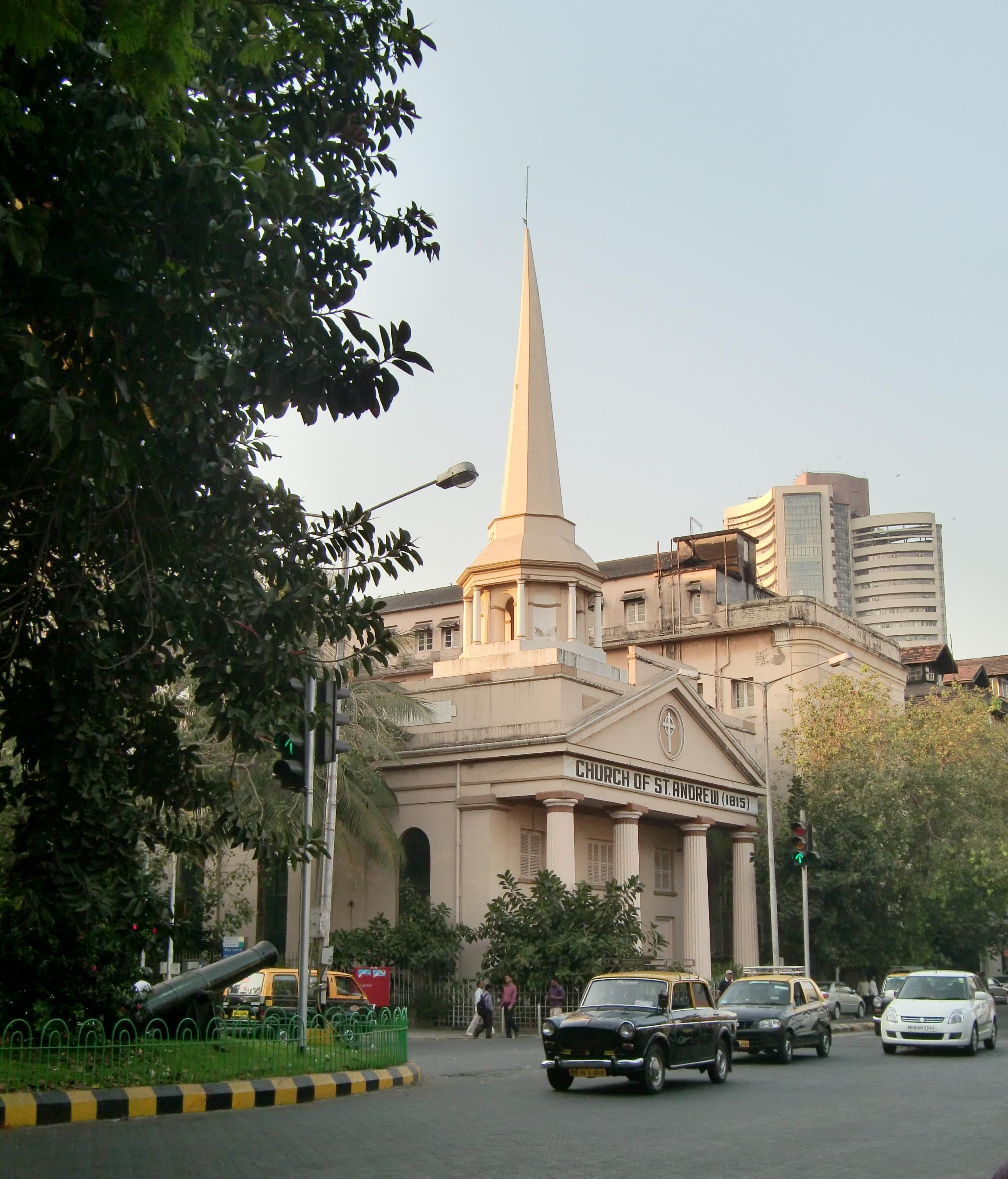
St Andrew, with a Neoclassical facade, is located opposite the Lion Gate.

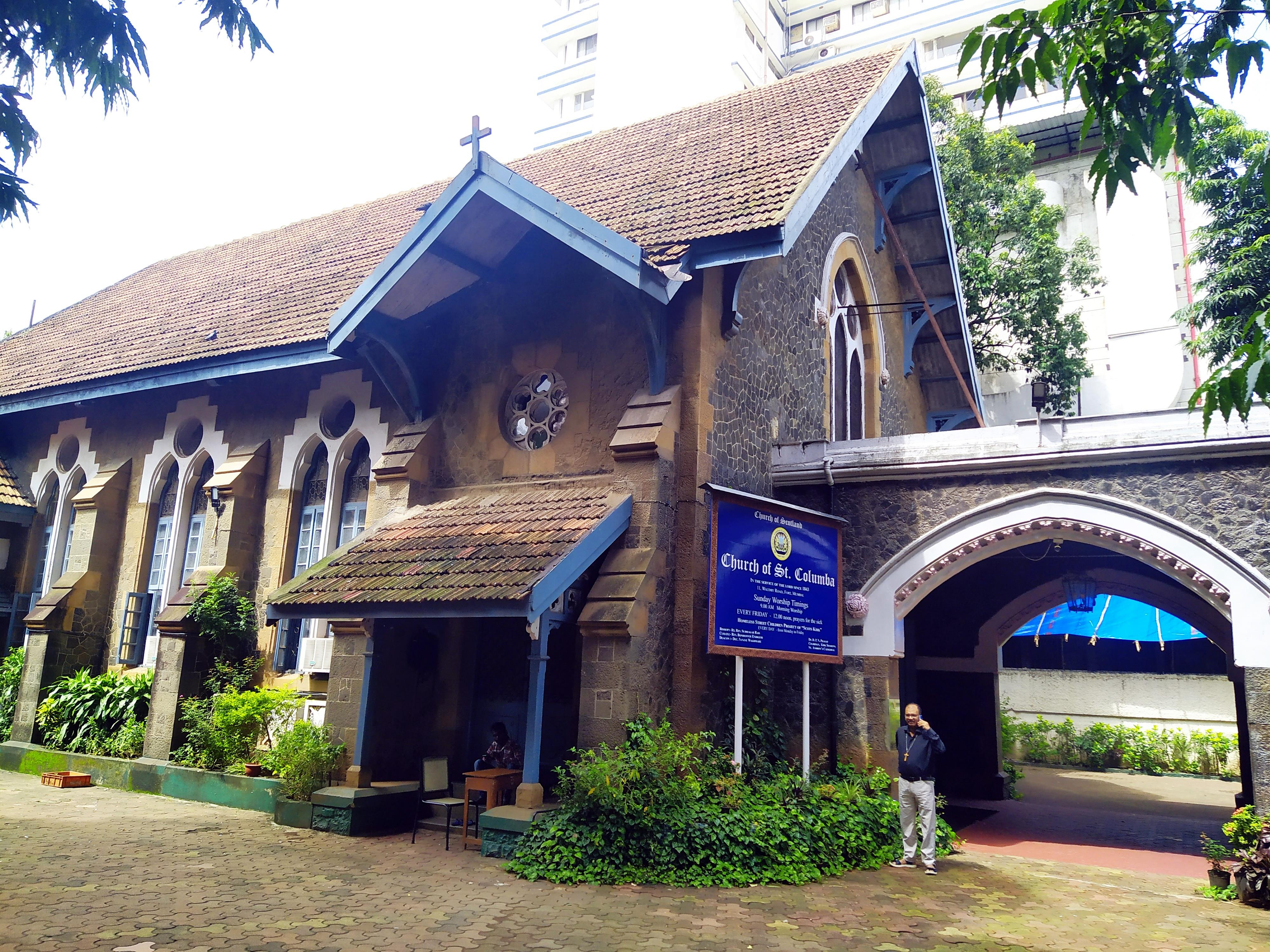
Church of St. Columba, Fort precinct

Church of St Andrew and St Columba (or Scots' Kirk) is a church with two separate buildings located in Kala Ghoda (St Andrew) and Fort (St Columba) in Mumbai, India. It was Bombay's first Scottish church and was built in 1819 after the arrival of the city's first Presbyterian minister, James Clow, who was appointed chaplain for the East India Company in 1815. The two Scottish churches were merged in 1938.

The architectural style of St Andrew is Greek Revival and the facade is said to have been inspired by St Martin-in-the-Fields in London. Both St Andrew and St Columba are only open on Sundays for service, and on other days the latter is used for the church's homeless street children project.
