= Franz Joseph Bridge =

Former suspension bridge over the Vltava in Prague

Coordinates: 50°05′39″N 14°25′37″E

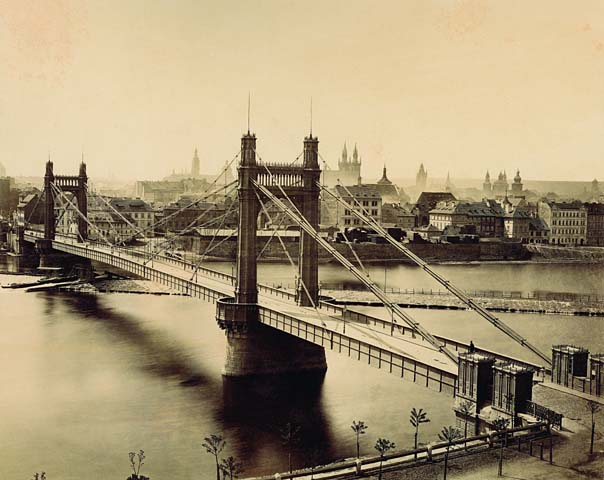
Franz Joseph Bridge in 1885

Franz Joseph Bridge (Czech: Most Františka Josefa), later renamed Štefanik Bridge (Czech: Štefánikův most), was a suspension bridge over the Vltava in Prague, opened in 1868.

The bridge was designed by the English engineer Rowland Mason Ordish. The design, which used the Ordish–Lefeuvre system, was originally created for the Albert Bridge over the River Thames in London. However, after construction of the Albert Bridge was delayed, Ordish decided to build a bridge in Prague first. The foundation stone was laid on 19 October 1865, and engineer František Schön was charged with supervising the construction work. Emperor Franz Joseph, after whom the bridge was named, attended the ceremonies for its opening on 13 May 1868.

Much like its London counterpart, the Franz Joseph Bridge featured a combination of stay and suspension rods. The latter formed a cable which held the diagonal stay rods. The main span was 100 metres (330 feet) long and 9.76 metres (32.0 feet) wide, while the entire structure was over 240 metres (790 feet) long. The bridge was gradually strengthened and rebuilt in the 1890s.

In 1919, following the fall of the Austro-Hungarian Empire and its monarchy, the Franz Joseph Bridge was renamed in honour of the Slovak politician and astronomer Milan Rastislav Štefánik. In the 1930s, the bridge could no longer bear the increasing traffic in Czechoslovakia's capital, and the authorities began considering its replacement. It was named after the Czech composer Leoš Janáček for a short period in the 1940s. The bridge was demolished in 1941 and replaced with a reinforced concrete one named after the communist activist Jan Šverma in 1951. In 1997, the new bridge was renamed the Štefánik Bridge.
