= Frederick Arnold (rower) =

Frederick Montagu Arnold (10 March 1823 – 11 August 1898) was an English rower, school teacher, officer in the volunteers and clergyman.

Arnold was born at Ellough, Suffolk, the son of Richard Aldous Arnold who was rector there. He was educated at Rugby School and then at the College for Civil Engineers at Putney. He then went to Gonville and Caius College, Cambridge. He was a rowing Blue, being a member of the Cambridge crew which won 1845 Boat Race and then the Grand Challenge Cup at Henley Royal Regatta. He also won the first Silver Wherries at Henley with his partner Gerard Mann in 1845.

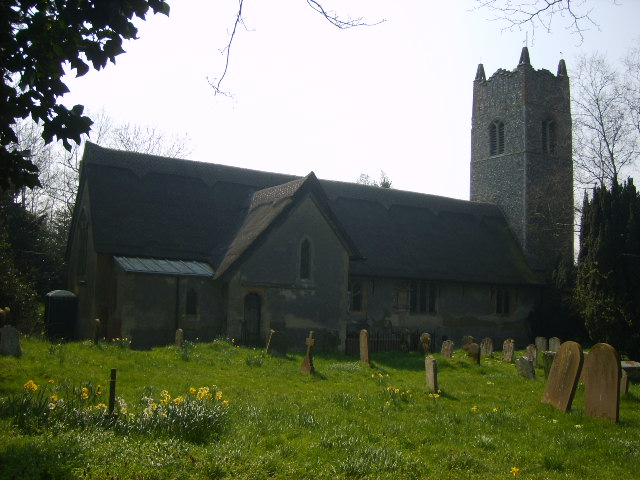
All Saints' Church, Ringsfield

Arnold was ordained deacon at Chichester in 1848 and priest in 1850 and from 1848 to 1854 he was a Fellow of St Nicholas College, Shoreham. He was an assistant master at Lancing College from 1848 to 1851 and at Hurstpierpoint College in 1850 and 1851. He was then headmaster of the military branch of the Woodard Schools, Leyton from 1851 to 1855. In 1855 he moved to Kingston upon Thames where he was a private tutor from 1855 to 1882. He was a major in the 3rd Battalion East Surrey Regiment and the first president of Kingston Rowing Club.

In 1881 Arnold became rector of Ringsfield, Suffolk where he remained until his death. He was chairman of the Wangford Union Board of Guardians and a justice of the peace.

Arnold died at the age of 75 and was buried at Ringsfield.

== See also ==
- List of Cambridge University Boat Race crews
