= Henry Palfrey Stephenson =

English civil engineer

Henry Palfrey Stephenson (27 March 1826 – 30 April 1890) was a Scottish-born civil engineer, and a founder of the Society of Engineers.

The son of Major John Stephenson of the 6th Dragoon Guards, Stephenson was born at Portobello, near Edinburgh, and lived for some early years in Ireland before being privately educated at a school in Twickenham. In 1842, he became a student at the College for Civil Engineers in Putney (Sir Guilford Molesworth was among his fellow students). With Robert Monro Christie, he founded the Putney Club in 1854, which later became the Society of Engineers, serving as its chairman in 1856 and 1859.

Stephenson's early professional work mainly involved surveys for railway routes in Ireland, dock works (he worked on the extension of Sunderland docks under John Murray), design of iron railway bridges (working for two years in partnership with William Dredge, and later with Robert King), English railway projects (he was engineer to the Ware, Hadham and Buntingford Railway), and arbitration work. From 1858 he designed and managed several town gas lighting projects in Germany and Holland, later serving on the boards of several UK and overseas gas companies. Elected an associate of the Institution of Civil Engineers in 1853, he became a full member in 1864.
