= Kala Ghoda =

Arts District in Mumbai, India

Kala Ghoda Art Precinct
- Arts District/neighborhood
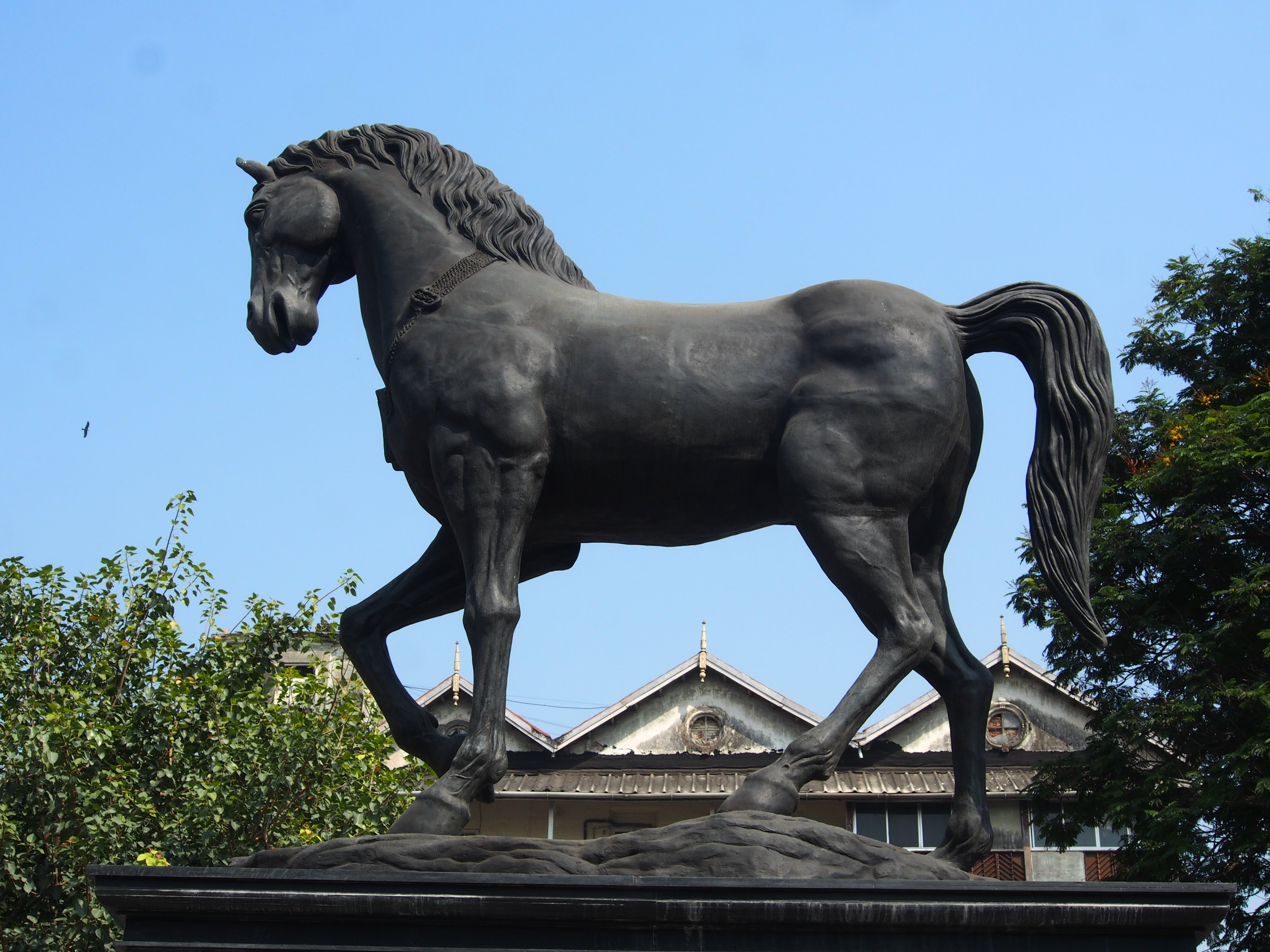
- The Kala Ghoda Statue

- Location of Kala Ghoda in Mumbai
- Coordinates: 18.9307°N 72.8331°E
- Country: India
- State: Maharashtra
- Metro: Mumbai
- PIN Code: 400032

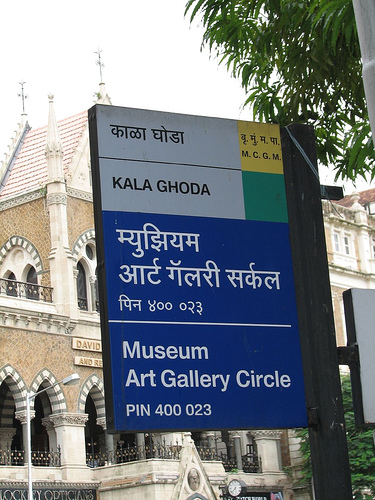
'Kala Ghoda signage'

Kala Ghoda (IPA:Kāḷā Ghōḍālit. 'Black Horse') is a crescent-shaped art district/neighborhood in Mumbai, India. It hosts several of the city's heritage buildings including museums, art galleries and educational institutions like the Chhatrapati Shivaji Maharaj Vastu Sangrahalaya, the Jehangir Art Gallery, the National Gallery of Modern Art, and The Arts Trust - Institute of Contemporary Indian Art.

The area hosts the Kala Ghoda Arts Festival annually in February. The area is sandwiched between Mumbai Port's docklands to the east, Regal Cinema to the south, Hutatma Chowk and Flora Fountain to the north and Oval Maidan to the west. The Bombay Stock Exchange is to its north east.

== History ==
The name Kala Ghoda is a reference to the presence of a black stone statue of King Edward VII (as the then Prince of Wales) mounted on a horse that was built by Jewish businessman and philanthropist Albert Abdullah David Sassoon, although this statue was removed from the precinct in 1965 and subsequently placed inside the Byculla Zoo. A local legend stated that the statues of King Edward and the one of Shivaji on a horse at the Gateway of India came to life after midnight and battled it out on the streets. In 2017, the 'Kala Ghoda' returned to the area with a new statue of a similar looking horse without a rider, being commissioned by the Kala Ghoda Association. The statue, titled 'Spirit of Kala Ghoda' was designed by architect Alfaz Miller and sculpted by Shreehari Bhosle.

Prior to the founding of the Bombay Stock Exchange, merchants often traded shares at the junction of Rampart row and Meadow street.

== Landmarks ==
The Esplanade Mansion, India's oldest surviving cast iron building, is in Kala Ghoda. Formerly known as Watson's Hotel, it was the site where films were introduced to India with a screening of the Lumière brothers Cinematograph in 1896. The offices of art publication, Marg, are on the third floor of the historic Army and Navy Building.

- Esplanade Mansion, once Mumbai's premier and pioneering Watson's Hotel
- Bajaj Art Gallery
- Bombay Natural History Society
- Jehangir Art Gallery and the Pavement Gallery
- Chhatrapati Shivaji Maharaj Vastu Sangrahalaya, the main museum in Mumbai
- National Gallery of Modern Art
- Elphinstone College
- Rhythm House
- Max Müeller Bhavan – Indo-German cultural centre
- Army & Navy Building, housing the Westside shopping store
- David Sassoon Library
- Ropewalk Street
- Knesseth Eliyahoo Synagogue
- Church of St Andrew and St Columba
- Lion's Gate
- K. R. Cama Oriental Institute, Asia's oldest library and research archive exclusively devoted to Indo-Iranian and Zoroastrian studies
- Mumbai University
- Civil and Sessions Court
- The Great Western Building, formerly Admiralty House.
Kala Ghoda Area Landmarks
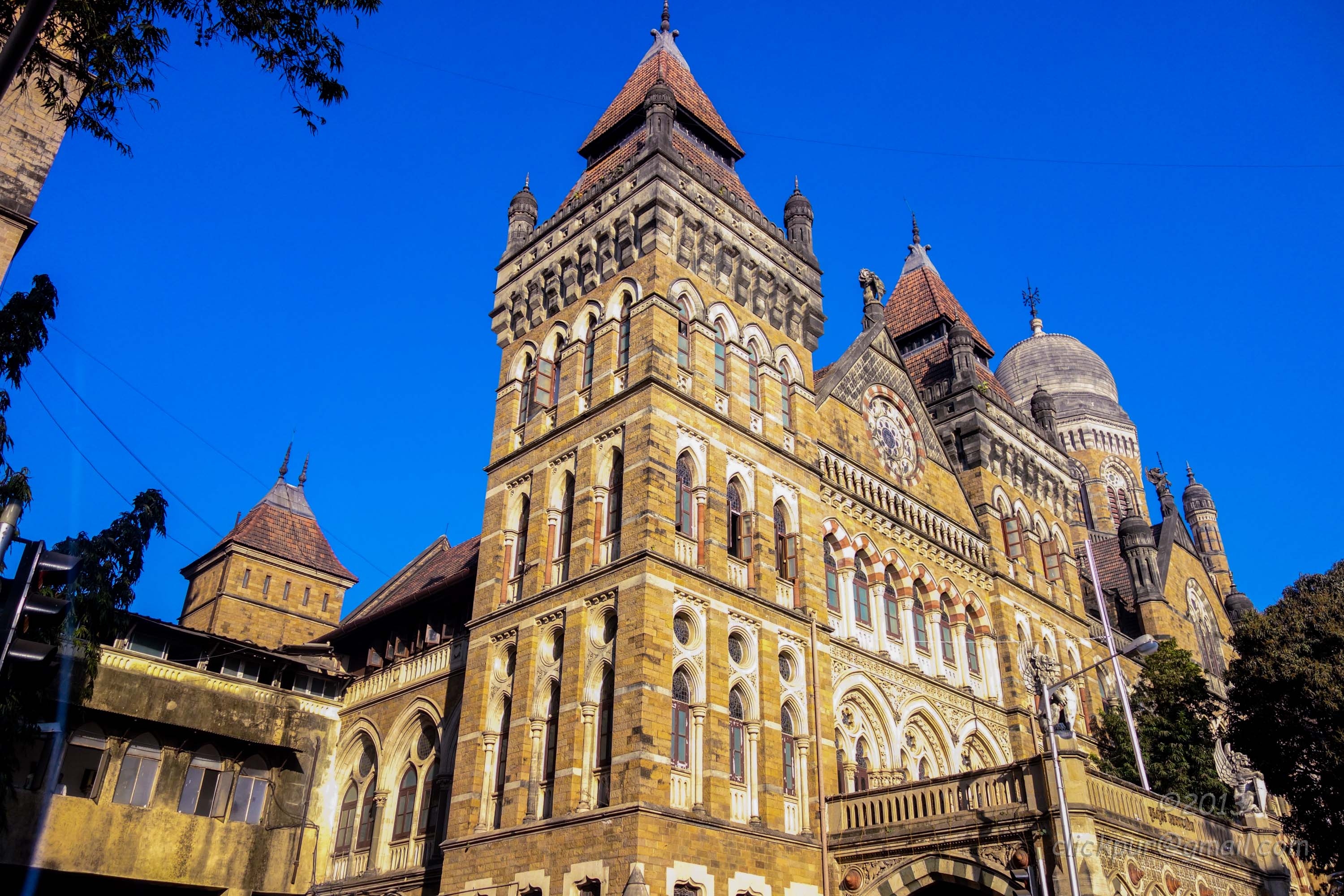
Kala Ghoda Fort

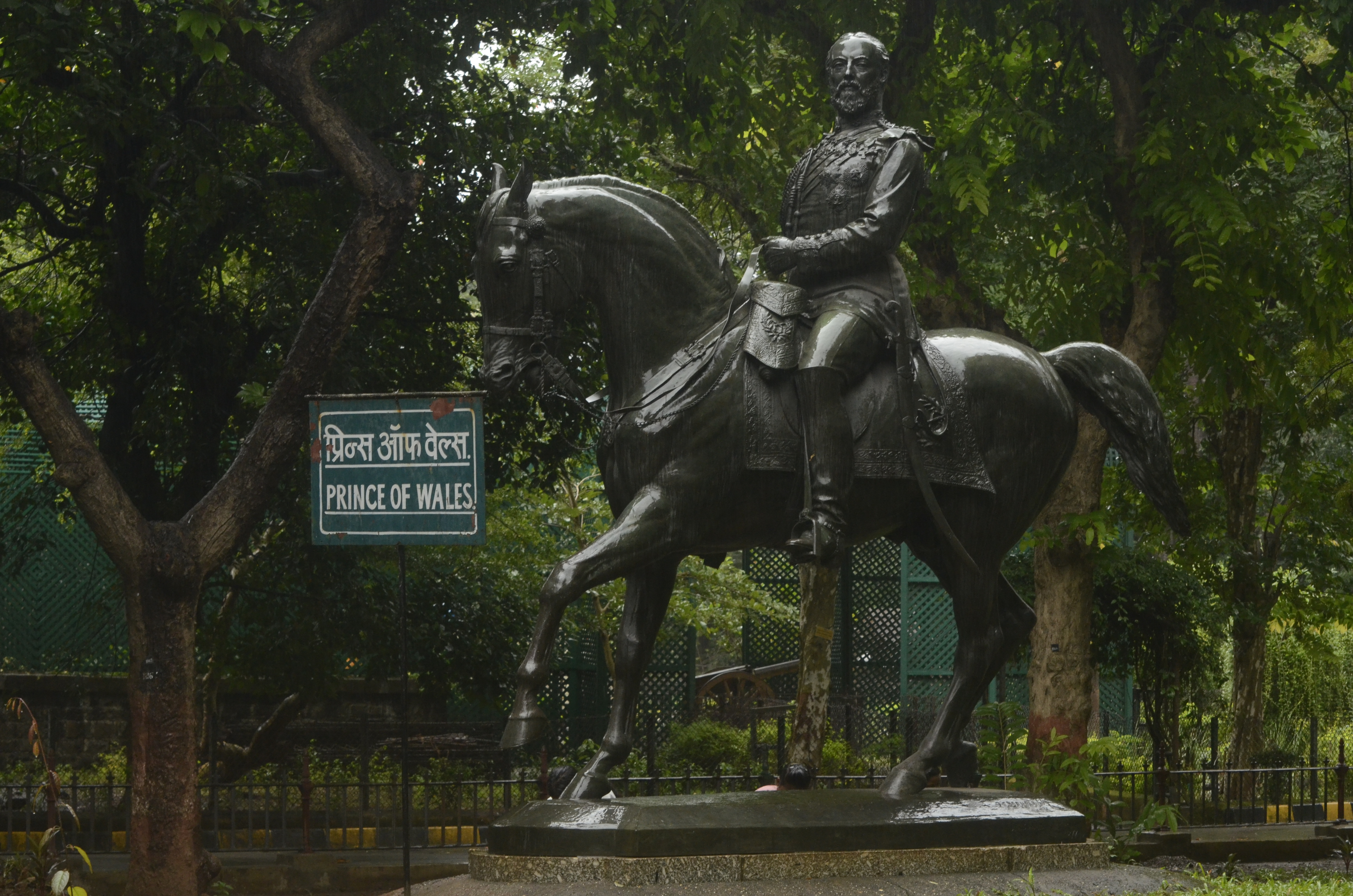
Kalaghoda statue at the Jijamata Udyan, Byculla, Mumbai

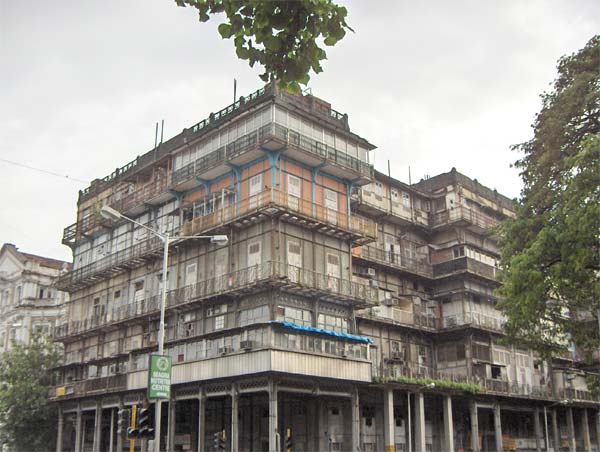
Watson's Hotel in Kala Ghoda.

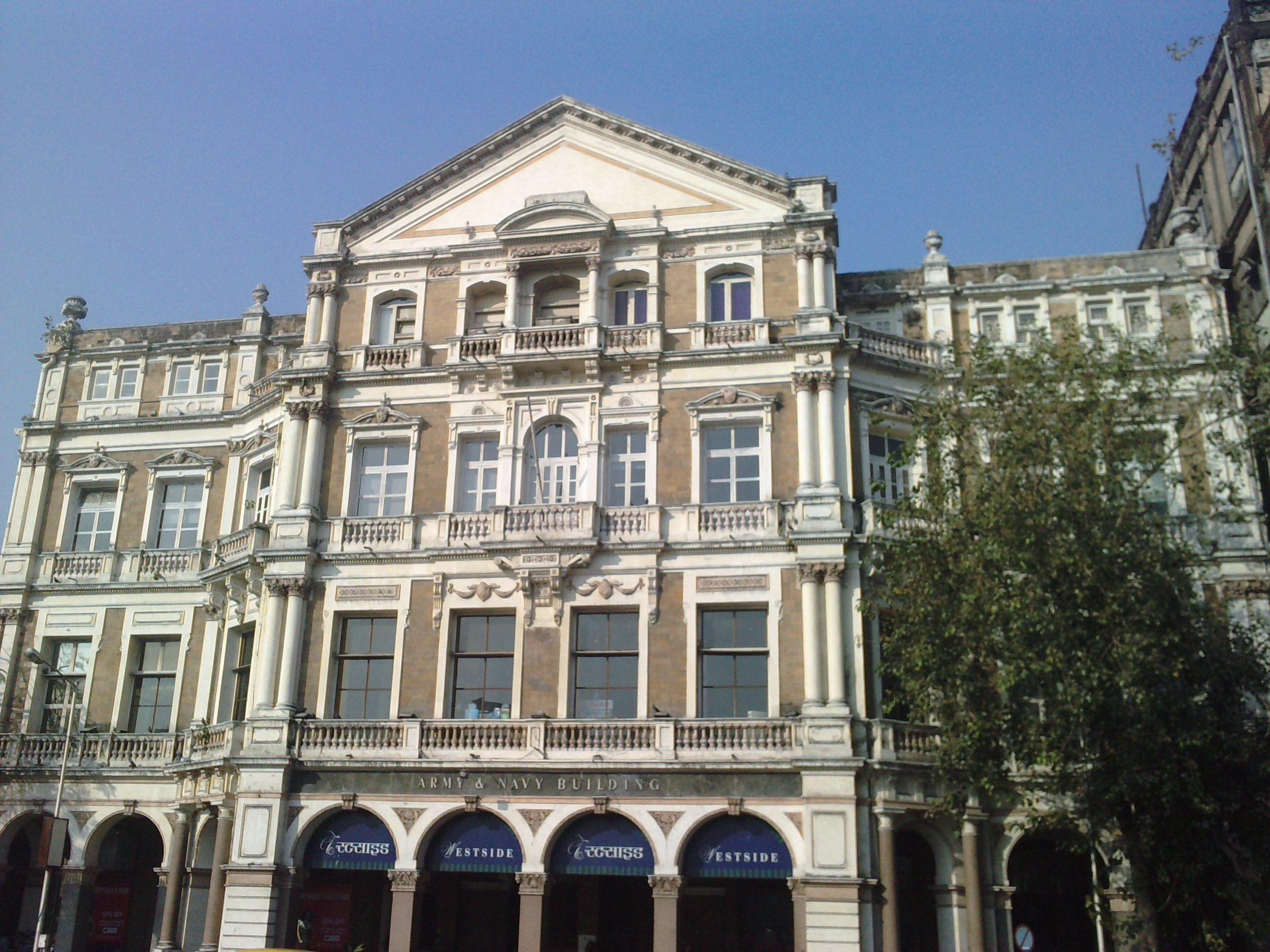
Army & Navy Building in Kala Ghoda

== See also ==
- Kala Ghoda Arts Festival
