= Ordish–Lefeuvre system =

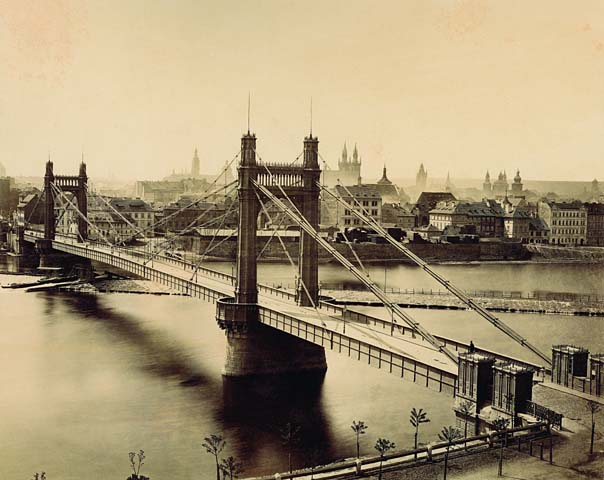
The 1868 Franz Joseph Bridge

The Ordish–Lefeuvre system or principle is an early form of cable-stayed bridge design, patented by English engineers Rowland Mason Ordish and William Henry Le Feuvre in 1858.

The Ordish–Lefeuvre system differs from conventional suspension bridges in that, while as with a conventional suspension bridge a parabolic cable supports the centre of the bridge, inclined stays support the remainder of the bridge's load. Each stay consists of a flat wrought iron bar attached to the bridge deck, and a wire rope connects the wrought iron bar to one of four octagonal support columns.

Only two major bridges were built using the Ordish–Lefeuvre principle. Ordish was commissioned to build Albert Bridge in Chelsea, London, using the design in 1864, but the start of work on the bridge was delayed due to negotiations regarding the proposed Chelsea Embankment at the northern end of the proposed bridge. While plans for the Chelsea Embankment were debated, Ordish built the Franz Joseph Bridge over the Vltava in Prague to the same design as that intended for Albert Bridge.

In 1870 work finally began on Albert Bridge, with construction expected to take roughly a year. In the event, construction took over three years, and the bridge opened with no formal ceremony on 23 August 1873, almost ten years after it had been authorised.

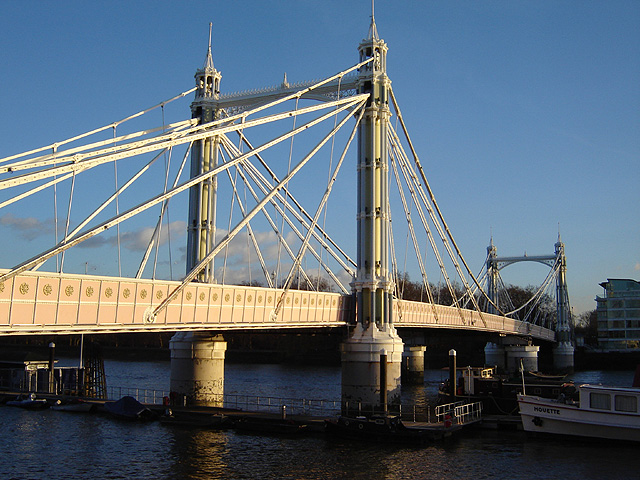
Albert Bridge was augmented with conventional suspension chains in 1887 and with central supports in 1972

Albert Bridge was inspected in 1884 by Sir Joseph Bazalgette, Chief Engineer of the Metropolitan Board of Works, who found that the steel rods were already showing serious signs of corrosion. Over the next three years the steel staying rods were augmented with steel chains, giving it an appearance more closely resembling a conventional suspension bridge, and a new timber deck was laid. Albert Bridge continued to suffer serious structural weakness and in 1972 the Greater London Council added two concrete piers in the middle of the river, supporting the central span and turning the central section of the bridge into a beam bridge.

Damaged through overuse during the Second World War, the Franz Joseph Bridge was demolished in the 1950s and replaced with a conventional bridge, leaving Albert Bridge the only surviving example of a significant bridge built using the Ordish–Lefeuvre principle.

== Notes and references ==
Bibliography

- Cookson, Brian (2006), Crossing the River, Edinburgh: Mainstream, ISBN 1-84018-976-2, OCLC 63400905
- Davenport, Neil (2006), Thames Bridges: From Dartford to the Source, Kettering: Silver Link Publishing, ISBN 1-85794-229-9
- Matthews, Peter (2008), London's Bridges, Oxford: Shire, ISBN 978-0-7478-0679-0, OCLC 213309491
- Roberts, Chris (2005), Cross River Traffic, London: Granta, ISBN 1-86207-800-9
- Smith, Denis (2001), Civil Engineering Heritage London and the Thames Valley, London: Thomas Telford, ISBN 0-7277-2876-8
- Tilly, Graham (2002), Conservation of Bridges, Didcot: Taylor & Francis, ISBN 0-419-25910-4
