= Rowland Mason Ordish =

Rowland Mason Ordish (11 April 1824 – 1886) was an English engineer. He is most noted for his design of the Winter Garden, Dublin (1865), for his detailed work on the single-span roof of London's St Pancras railway station, undertaken with William Henry Barlow (1868) and the Albert Bridge, a crossing of the River Thames in London, completed in 1873.

== Biography ==
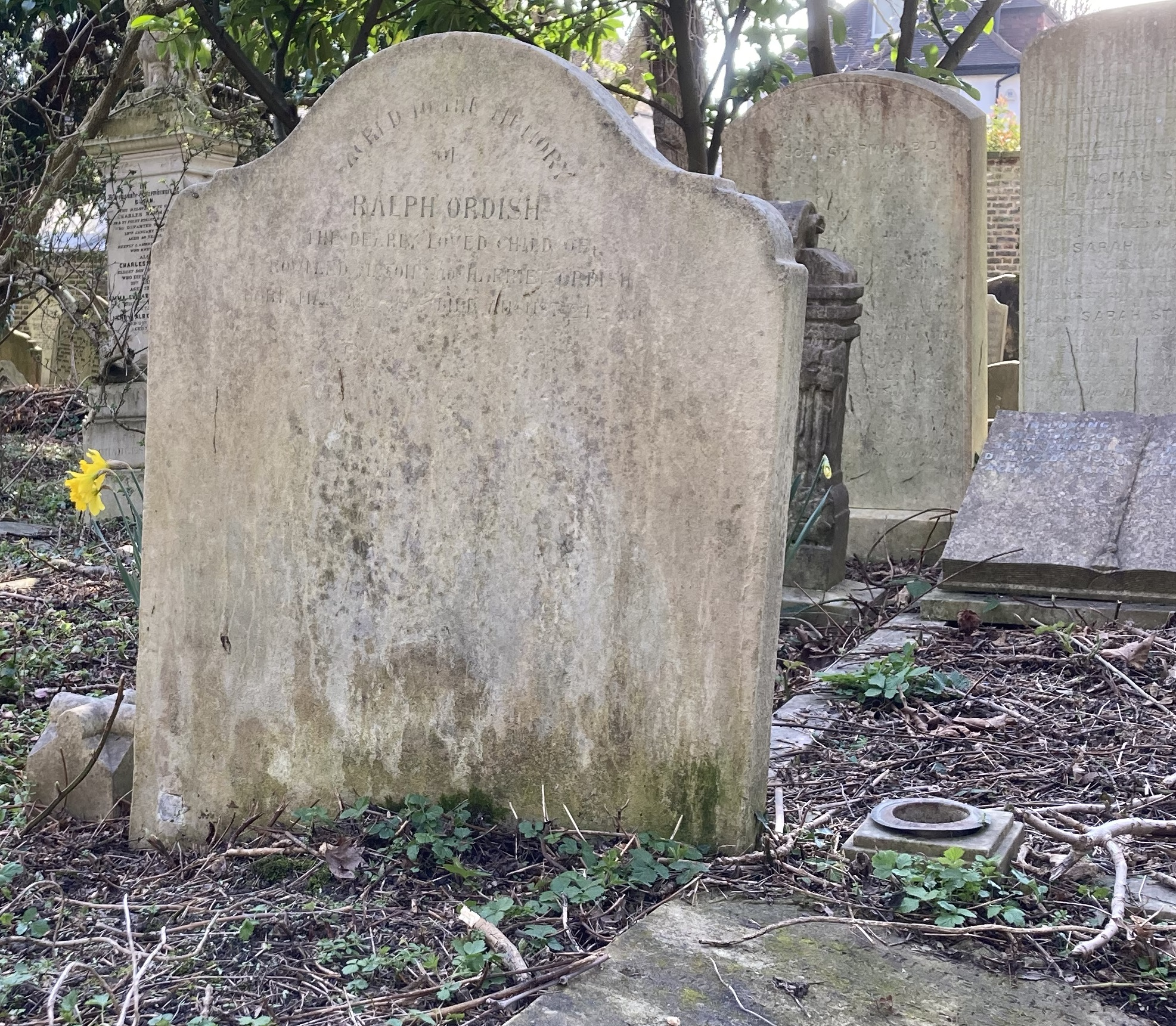
Family grave of Rowland Mason Ordish in Highgate Cemetery

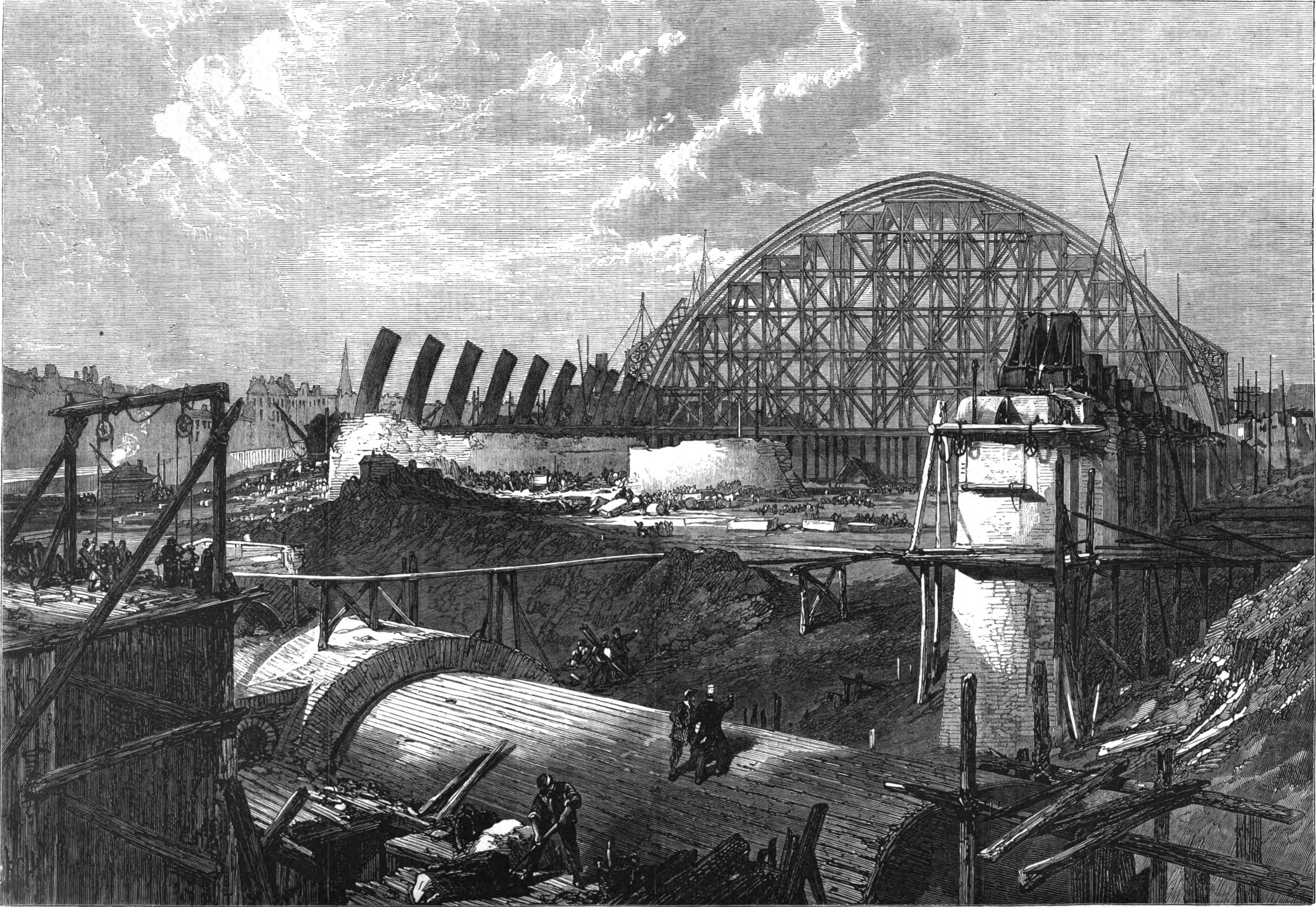
The roof of St Pancras Station under construction in 1868

Born in Melbourne, Derbyshire, Ordish was the son of a land agent and surveyor. He worked with Charles Fox, who was responsible for the construction of Joseph Paxton's Crystal Palace in Hyde Park, London, in 1851. He subsequently supervised its re-erection in Sydenham, south London.

His other projects included:

- Farringdon Street Bridge, London
- Holborn Viaduct, London (1863–1869)
- Derby market hall (1866)
- Franz Joseph I Suspension Bridge, over the Vltava, Prague (1868, bombed 1941, demolished in 1947)
- Cavenagh Bridge, Singapore (1869)
- Esplanade Mansions, Mumbai, India (1869)
- dome of Royal Albert Hall, London (1871)

He died in 1886 and was buried in a family grave on the western side of Highgate Cemetery.

== Bridge design ==
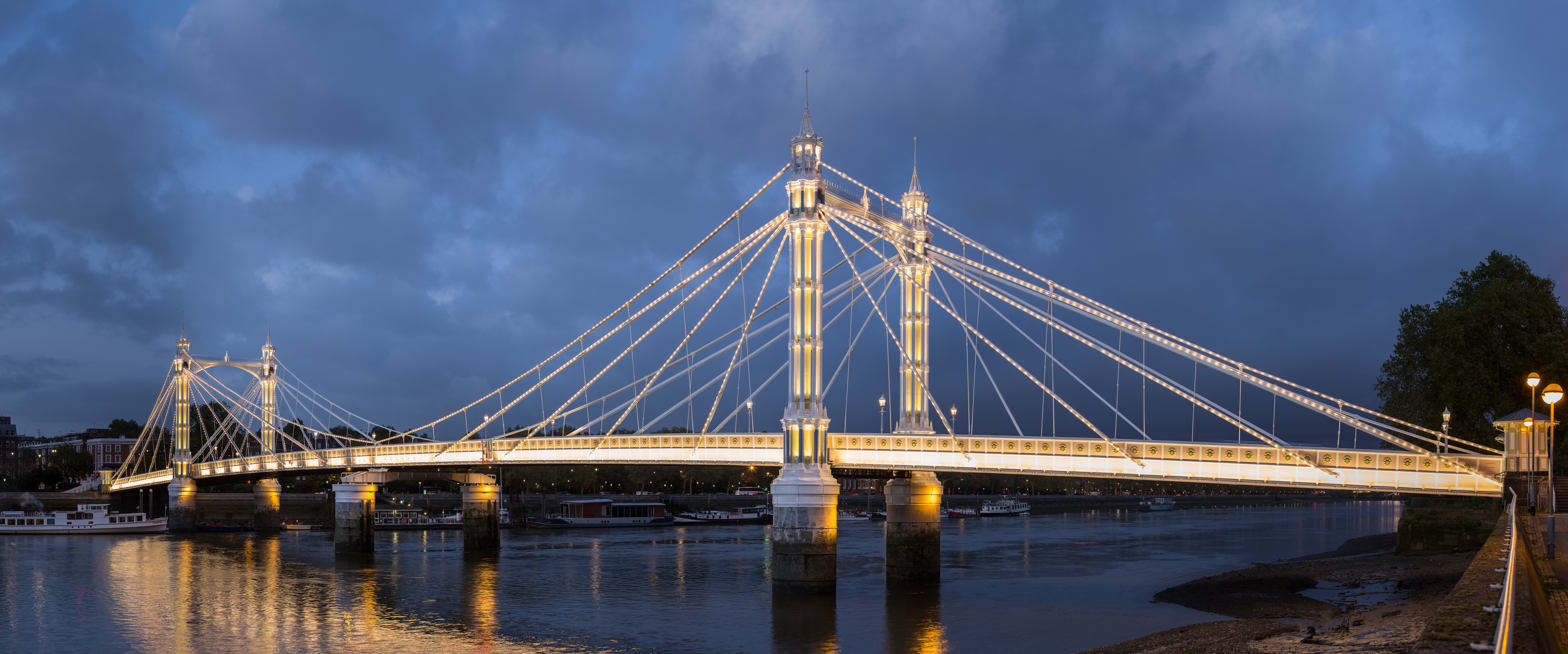
The Albert Bridge over the River Thames

In 1858 Ordish patented a bridge suspension system, which he later used in the design of bridges across several European rivers that include Neva at St Petersburg. The system, which consists of a rigid girder suspended by inclined straight chains, was known as Ordish's straight-chain suspension system.

The Ordish–Lefeuvre Principle is named after him and his partner William Henry Le Feuvre (1832–1896) from Jersey (together the pair submitted plans for the department store De Gruchy's in St Helier, Jersey).
