= Jan Šverma =

Czech Communist activist, journalist and resistance fighter (1901–1944)

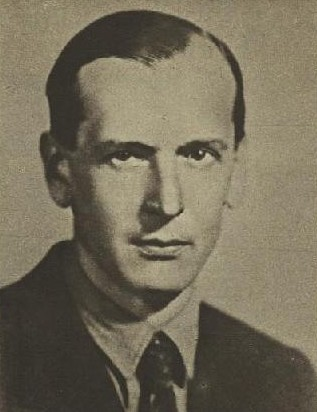

Jan Šverma (23 March 1901, Mnichovo Hradiště – 10 November 1944, Mt. Chabenec, Low Tatras) was a Czech journalist, communist activist and resistance fighter against the Nazi-backed Slovak State. Šverma was considered a national hero in the Czechoslovak Socialist Republic.

== Biography ==
Ŝverma was born in to the family of a lawyer who briefly served as mayor of Mnichovo Hradiště. He studied law at the Charles University but did not finish his studies and dedicated himself to political activism.

Šverma joined the Communist Party of Czechoslovakia (KSČ) in 1921. He contributed to Rudé právo, the official publication of the KSČ and was its editor-in-chief from 1936 to 1938. From 1929 he was a member of the KSČ Central Committee and Politburo.

Šverma spent time in exile in Paris and Moscow during the existence of the Nazi-backed Slovak State and was close to Klement Gottwald, the Chairman of the KSČ, who later would become the first Communist president of Czechoslovakia.

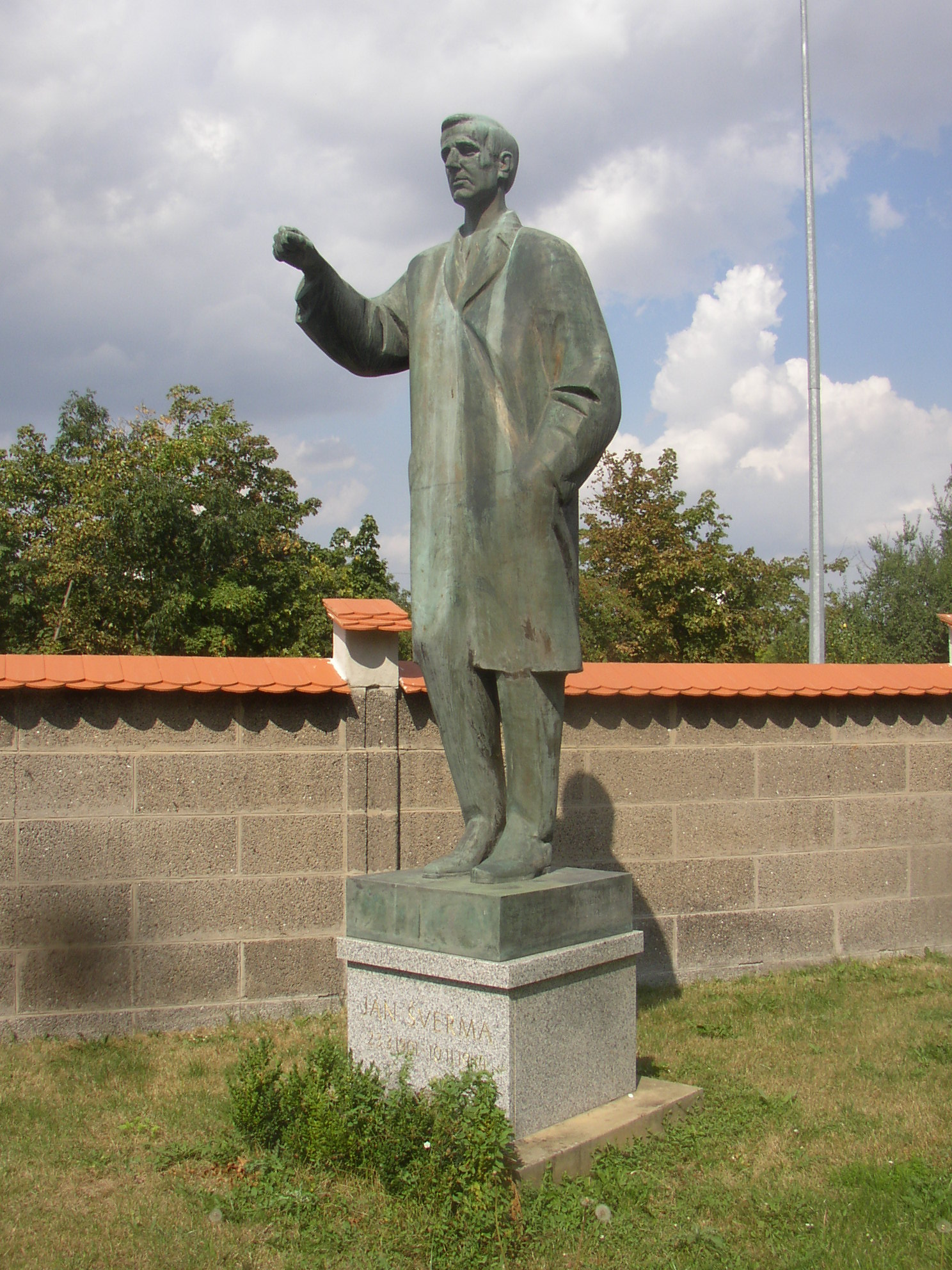
Statue of Jan Šverma at Olšany Cemetery

Šverma assumed the political leadership of Czechoslovak military units formed in the Soviet Union during the Nazi invasion of the USSR. He died of exhaustion on the mountain Chabenec in the Low Tatras mountain range during a snowstorm on 10 November 1944, while leading an insurrection of Slovak communists against the Slovak State.

The circumstances of Šverma's death is described in the book Odsudíde je k život (published in exile in 1976) by Vladimír Přikryl. He was a direct witness to the discovery of an exhausted Šverma, who, according to the witness's testimony, was left lying in the snow by Rudolf Slánský, who had a strained relationship with Šverma. He was suppressed as an important witness, and also thanks to his military past, he ended up in a prison in 1949 (allegedly on the direct orders of Slánský), from which he was released in 1953, only after Slánský's execution.

== Legacy ==
A bridge in Prague at the former location of the Franz Joseph Bridge was named after Šverma in 1951. The village Telgárt in Slovakia was called Švermovo from 1948 to 1990. The metro station in Prague presently named Jinonice was formerly called Švermova. Many places named after communist-era heroes were renamed after the Velvet Revolution.
