= Lion Gate (Mumbai) =

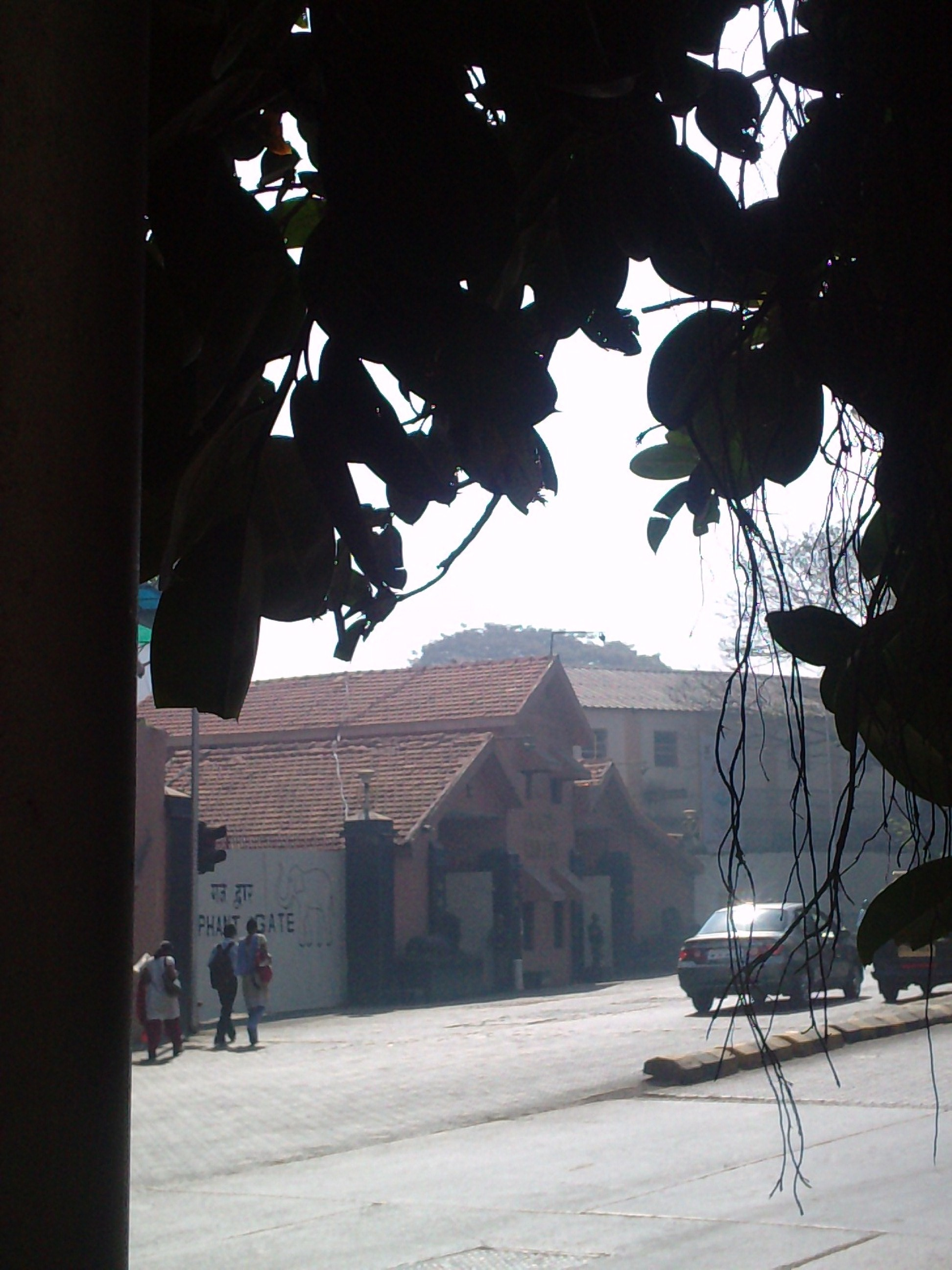
Elephant gate and Lion gate

Lion Gate is a locality in Mumbai, India. The old heritage building of the Naval Dockyard starts from Lion Gate.
