= Albert Bridge, London =

Bridge over the River Thames

Albert Bridge
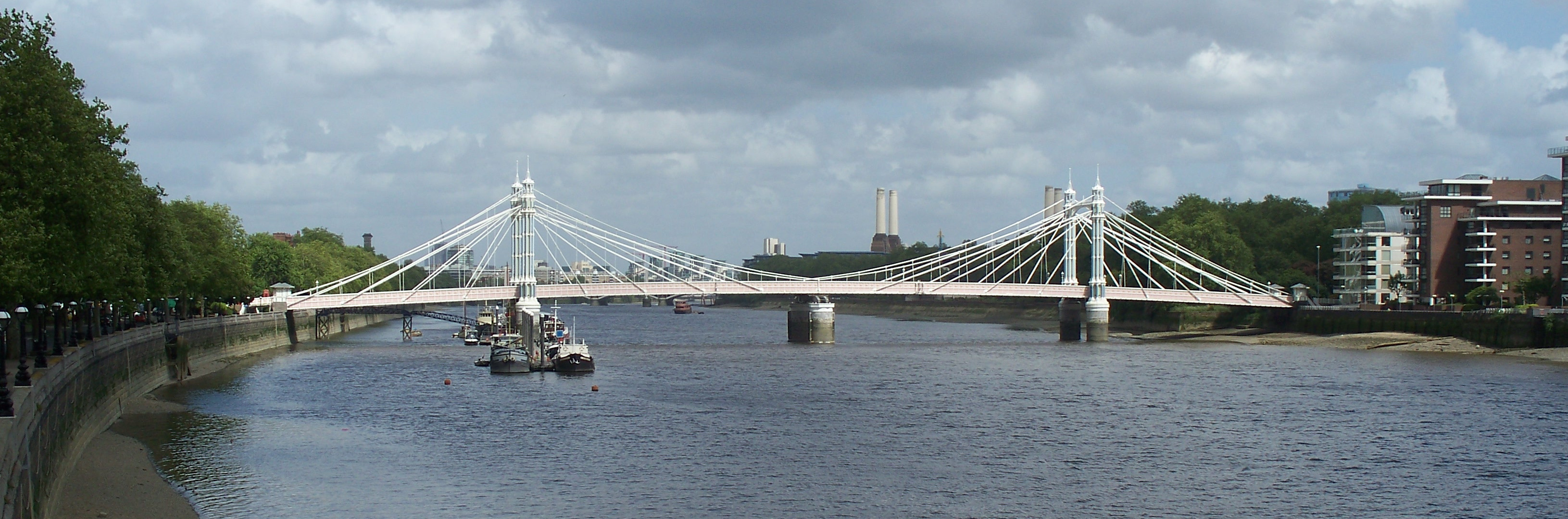
- Coordinates: 51.4823°N 0.1667°W
- Carries: A3031 road
- Crosses: River Thames
- Locale: Battersea and Chelsea, London
- Maintained by: Kensington and Chelsea London Borough Council
- Heritage status: Grade II* listed structure
- Preceded by: Battersea Bridge
- Followed by: Chelsea Bridge

Characteristics
- Design: Ordish–Lefeuvre system, subsequently modified to an Ordish–Lefeuvre system / suspension bridge / beam bridge hybrid design
- Total length: 710 feet (220 m)
- Width: 41 feet (12 m)
- Height: 66 feet (20 m)
- Longest span: 384 feet 9 inches (117.27 m) (before 1973); 185 feet (56 m) (after 1973)
- No. of spans: 4 (3 before 1973)
- Piers in water: 6 (4 before 1973)
- Clearance below: 37 feet 9 inches (11.5 m) at lowest astronomical tide

History
- Designer: Rowland Mason Ordish, Joseph Bazalgette
- Opened: 23 August 1873; 153 years ago

Statistics
- Daily traffic: 19,821 vehicles (2004)

Location
- Interactive map of Albert Bridge

Albert Bridge is a road bridge over the River Thames connecting Chelsea on the north bank to Battersea on the south. Designed and built by Rowland Mason Ordish in 1873 as an Ordish–Lefeuvre system modified cable-stayed bridge, it proved to be structurally unsound, so between 1884 and 1887 Sir Joseph Bazalgette incorporated some of the design elements of a suspension bridge. In 1973 the Greater London Council (GLC) added two concrete piers, which transformed the central span into a simple beam bridge. As a result, today the bridge is an unusual hybrid of three design styles. It is an English Heritage Grade II* listed building.

Built as a toll bridge, it was a commercial failure. Six years after its opening it was taken into public ownership and the tolls were lifted. The tollbooths remained in place and are the only surviving examples of bridge tollbooths in London. Nicknamed "The Trembling Lady" because of its tendency to vibrate when large numbers of people walked over it, the bridge has signs at its entrances that warn troops to break step whilst crossing the bridge.

Incorporating a roadway only 27 feet (8.2 m) wide, and with serious structural weaknesses, the bridge was ill-equipped to cope with the advent of the motor vehicle during the 20th century. Despite many calls for its demolition or pedestrianisation, Albert Bridge has remained open to vehicles throughout its existence, other than for brief spells during repairs. It is one of only two Thames road bridges in central London never to have been replaced (the other is Tower Bridge). The strengthening work carried out by Bazalgette and the GLC did not prevent further deterioration of the bridge's structure. A series of increasingly strict traffic control measures have been introduced to limit its use and thus prolong its life. As a result, it is the second-least busy Thames road bridge in London; only Southwark Bridge carries less traffic.

In 1992, Albert Bridge was rewired and painted in an unusual colour scheme designed to make it more conspicuous in poor visibility, and avoid being damaged by ships. At night it is illuminated by 4,000 LEDs, adding to its status as a landmark.

== History ==
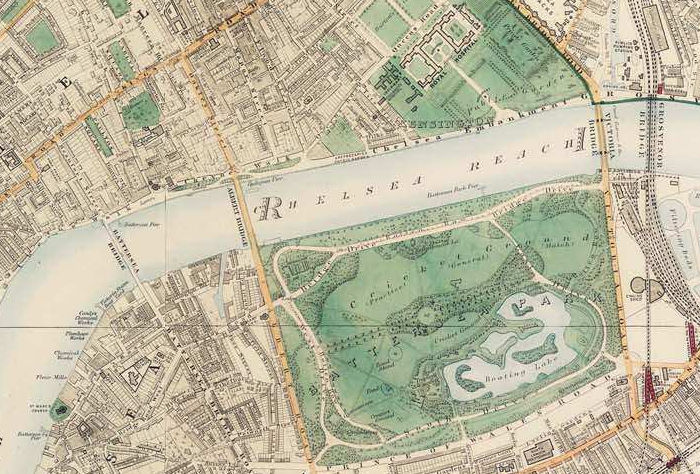
Chelsea and Battersea in 1891, showing (left to right) Old Battersea Bridge, Albert Bridge, Victoria (now Chelsea) Bridge and Grosvenor Bridge. Battersea and Albert bridges are 400 metres (1,300 ft) apart.

The historic industrial town of Chelsea on the north bank of the River Thames about 3 miles (5 km) west of Westminster, and the rich farming village of Battersea, facing Chelsea on the south bank, were linked by the modest wooden Battersea Bridge in 1771. In 1842 the Commission of Woods, Forests, and Land Revenues recommended the construction of an embankment at Chelsea to free land for development, and proposed a new bridge downstream of Battersea Bridge, and the replacement of the latter by a more modern structure. Work on the Victoria Bridge (later renamed Chelsea Bridge), a short distance downstream of Battersea Bridge, began in 1851 and was completed in 1858, with work on the Chelsea Embankment beginning in 1862. Meanwhile, the proposal to demolish Battersea Bridge was abandoned.

Albert Bridge Act 1864
- Act of Parliament
- Parliament of the United Kingdom
- Long title: An Act to incorporate a Company for making a new Bridge from Chelsea to Battersea, with Approaches thereto.
- Citation: 27 & 28 Vict. c. ccxxxv

Dates
- Royal assent: 25 July 1864

Text of statute as originally enacted

The wooden Battersea Bridge had become dilapidated by the mid-19th century. It had grown unpopular and was considered unsafe. The newer Victoria Bridge, meanwhile, suffered severe congestion. In 1860, Prince Albert suggested that a new tollbridge built between the two existing bridges would be profitable, and in the early 1860s, the Albert Bridge Company was formed with the aim of building this new crossing. A proposal put forward in 1863 was blocked by strong opposition from the operators of Battersea Bridge, which was less than 500 yards (460 m) from the proposed site of the new bridge and whose owners were consequently concerned over potential loss of custom. A compromise was reached, and in 1864 a new act of Parliament, the Albert Bridge Act 1864 (27 & 28 Vict. c. ccxxxv), was passed, authorising the new bridge on condition that it was completed within five years. The act compelled the Albert Bridge Company to purchase Battersea Bridge once the new bridge opened, and to compensate its owners by paying them £3,000 per annum (about £330,000 in 2025) in the interim.

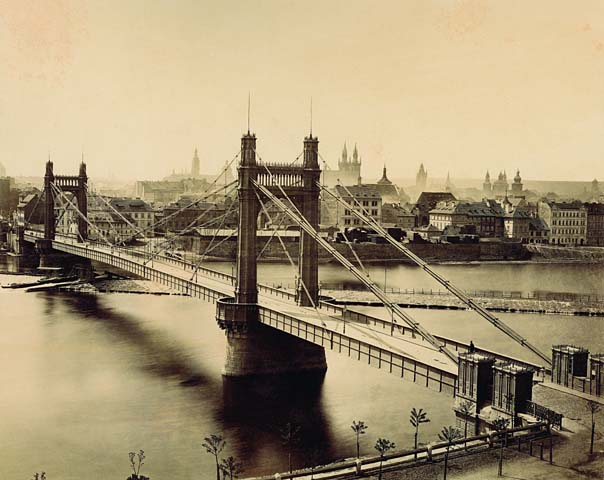
The 1868 Franz Joseph Bridge in Prague was built to the proposed design of the future Albert Bridge.

Rowland Mason Ordish was appointed to design the new bridge. Ordish was a leading architectural engineer who had worked on the Royal Albert Hall, St Pancras railway station, the Crystal Palace and Holborn Viaduct. The bridge was built using the Ordish–Lefeuvre system, an early form of cable-stayed bridge design that Ordish had patented in 1858. Ordish's design resembled a conventional suspension bridge in employing a parabolic cable to support the centre of the bridge, but differed in its use of 32 inclined stays to support the remainder of the load. Each stay consisted of a flat wrought iron bar attached to the bridge deck, and a wire rope composed of 1,000 1/10-inch (2.5 mm) diameter wires joining the wrought iron bar to one of the four octagonal support columns.

== Construction ==
Although authorised in 1864, work on the bridge was delayed by negotiations over the proposed Chelsea Embankment, for the bridge's design could not be completed until the exact layout of the new roads being built on the north bank of the river had been agreed. Whilst plans for the Chelsea Embankment were debated, Ordish built the Franz Joseph Bridge over the Vltava in Prague to the same design as that intended for the Albert Bridge. (Note: Damaged during the Second World War, the Franz Joseph Bridge was replaced by a more conventional bridge in the 1950s. The Albert Bridge and the Franz Joseph Bridge were the only significant bridges built using the Ordish–Lefeuvre system; a third, smaller bridge was built in Singapore.)

Albert Bridge Act 1869
- Act of Parliament
- Parliament of the United Kingdom
- Long title: An Act to extend the time limited for the completion of the Bridge and other works authorized by The Albert Bridge Act, 1864; and for other purposes.
- Citation: 32 & 33 Vict. c. xliv

Dates
- Royal assent: 24 June 1869
Other legislation
| Amends | Albert Bridge Act 1864 |
| Repealed by | Local Law (Greater London Council and Inner London Boroughs) Order 1965 |

Status: Repealed

Text of statute as originally enacted

Albert Bridge Act 1871
- Act of Parliament
- Parliament of the United Kingdom
- Long title: An Act to continue and enlarge the powers of the Acts relating to the Albert Bridge Company; and for other purposes.
- Citation: 34 & 35 Vict. c. lxxiii

Dates
- Royal assent: 29 June 1871
Other legislation
| Repealed by | Local Law (Greater London Council and Inner London Boroughs) Order 1965 |

Status: Repealed

Text of statute as originally enacted

Albert Bridge Act 1873
- Act of Parliament
- Parliament of the United Kingdom
- Long title: An Act to extend the time limited for the completion of the Bridge and other works authorised by "The Albert Bridge Act, 1864," "The Albert Bridge Act, 1869," and "The Albert Bridge Act, 1871," and to continue and enlarge the powers of such Acts; and for other purposes
- Citation: 36 & 37 Vict. c. xcvii

Dates
- Royal assent: 7 July 1873
Other legislation
| Amends | Albert Bridge Act 1864; Albert Bridge Act 1869; Albert Bridge Act 1871 |
| Repealed by | Local Law (Greater London Council and Inner London Boroughs) Order 1965 |

Status: Repealed

Text of statute as originally enacted

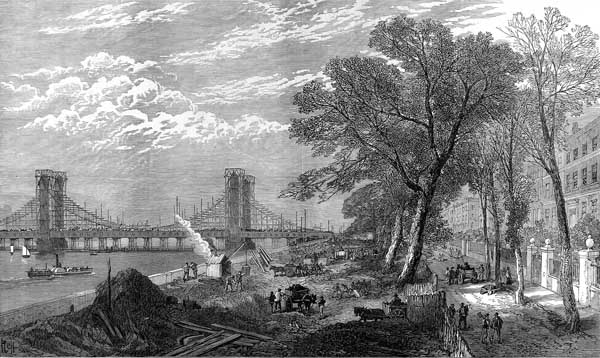
Chelsea Embankment and Albert Bridge under construction, 1873

In 1869, the five years allowed by the 1864 act to build the bridge expired. Delays caused by the Chelsea Embankment project meant that work on the bridge had not even begun, and three new acts of Parliament were required to extend the time limit, a further 18 months was granted by the Albert Bridge Act 1869 (32 & 33 Vict. c. xliv), an additional 18 months by the Albert Bridge Act 1871 (34 & 35 Vict. c. lxxiii) and a final six months by the Albert Bridge Act 1873 (36 & 37 Vict. c. xcvii). Construction finally got underway in 1870, and it was anticipated that the bridge would be completed in about a year, at a cost of £70,000 (about £7.2 million in 2025). In the event, the project ran for over three years, and the final bill came to £200,000 (about £18.8 million in 2025). It was intended to open the bridge and the Chelsea Embankment in a joint ceremony in 1874, but the Albert Bridge Company was keen to start recouping the substantially higher-than-expected costs, and the bridge opened without any formal ceremony on 23 August 1873, almost ten years after its authorisation. As the law demanded, the Albert Bridge Company then bought Battersea Bridge.

Ordish's bridge was 41 feet (12 m) wide and 710 feet (220 m) long, with a 384-foot-9-inch (117.27 m) central span. The deck was supported by 32 rigid steel rods suspended from four octagonal cast iron towers, with the towers resting on cast iron piers. The four piers were cast at Battersea and floated down the river into position, at which time they were filled with concrete; at the time they were the largest castings ever made. Unlike most other suspension bridges of the time, the towers were positioned outside the bridge to avoid causing any obstruction to the roadway. At each entrance was a pair of tollbooths with a bar between them, to prevent people entering the bridge without paying.

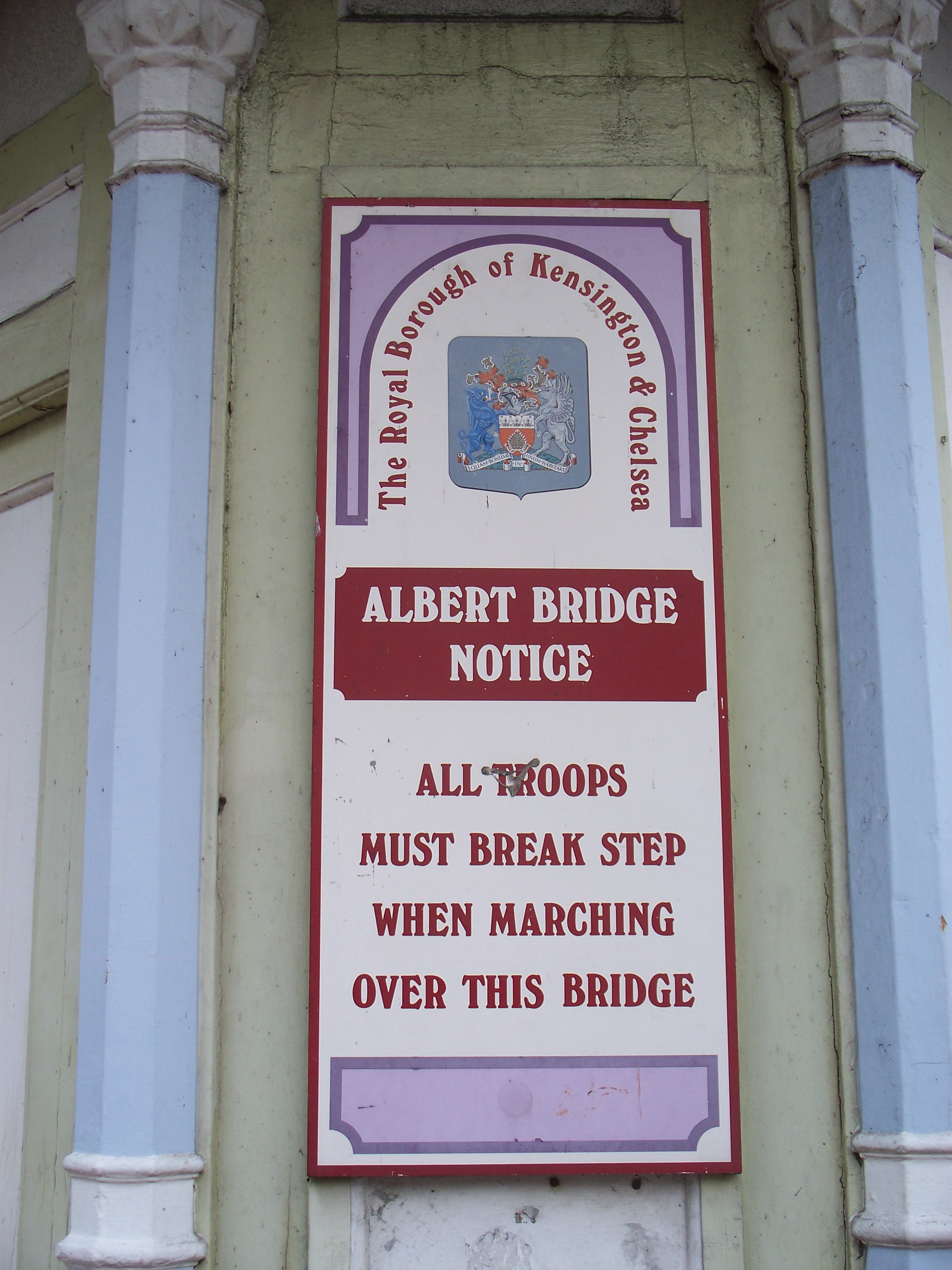
Warning to troops

The bridge acquired the nickname of "The Trembling Lady" because of its tendency to vibrate, particularly when used by troops from the nearby Chelsea Barracks. Concerns about the risks of mechanical resonance effects on suspension bridges, following the 1831 collapse of the Broughton Suspension Bridge and the 1850 collapse of Angers Bridge, led to notices being placed at the entrances warning troops to break step (i.e. not to march in rhythm) when crossing the bridge; (Note: The original sign at each end of the Albert Bridge read: "Officers in command of troops are requested to break step when passing over this bridge", which can be seen in the newsreel issued by British Pathe on 24 May 1954.) (Note: A similar resonance effect caused the temporary closure of the nearby Millennium Bridge in 2000 shortly after its opening.) Although the barracks closed in 2008, the warning signs are still in place.

== Transfer to public ownership ==
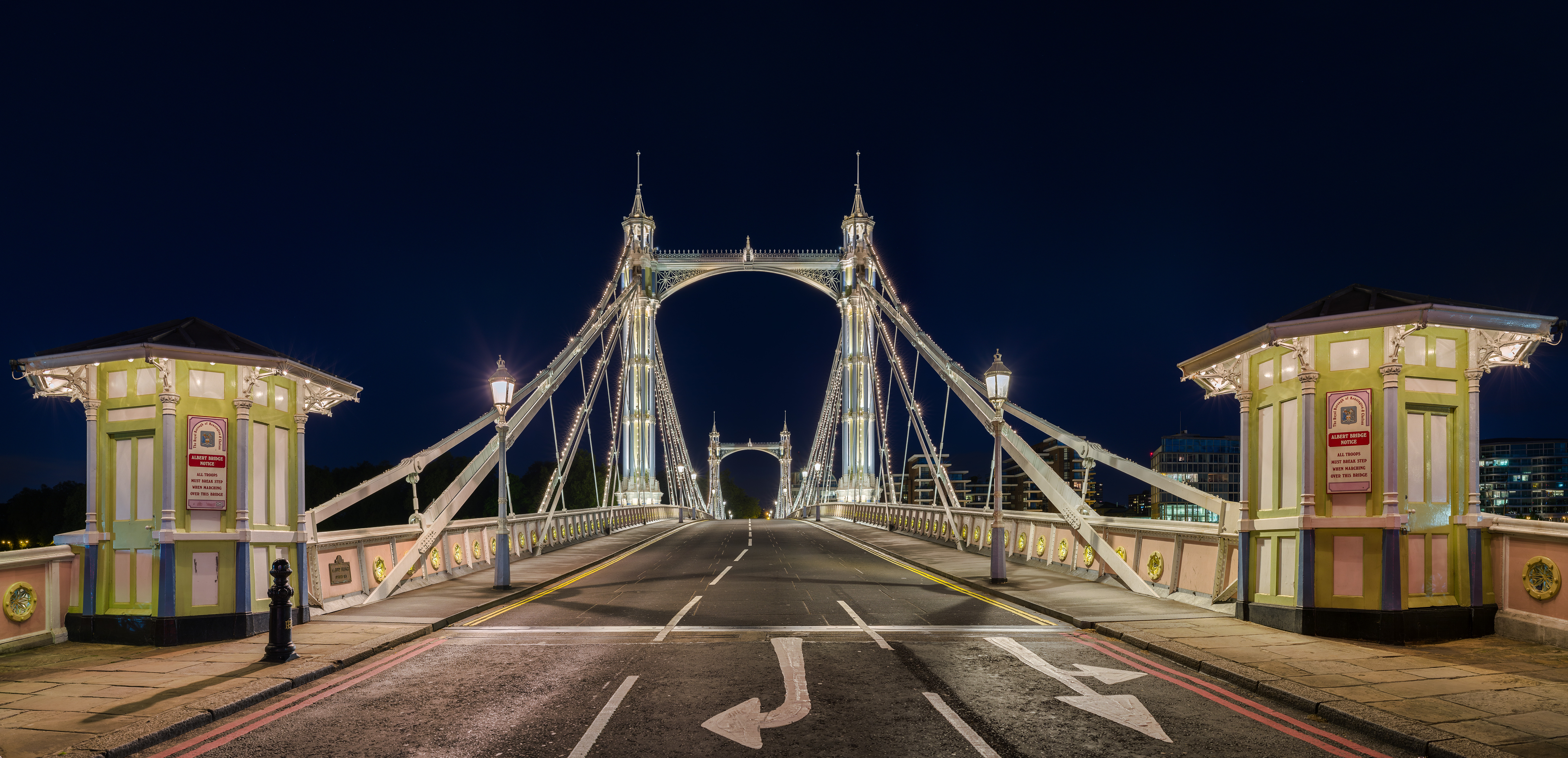
The octagonal tollbooths are London's last surviving bridge tollbooths.

Albert Bridge was catastrophically unsuccessful financially. By the time the new bridge opened, the Albert Bridge Company had been paying compensation to the Battersea Bridge Company for nine years, and on completion of the new bridge became liable for the costs of repairing the structure, which by then was dilapidated and dangerous. The cost of subsidising Battersea Bridge drained funds intended for the building of wide approach roads, making the bridge difficult to reach. It was located slightly further from central London than neighbouring Victoria (Chelsea) Bridge, and demand for the new bridge was less than expected. In the first nine months of its operation £2,085 (about £204,000 in 2025) were taken in tolls.

The Metropolis Toll Bridges Act 1877 (40 & 41 Vict. c. xcix) was passed, which allowed the Metropolitan Board of Works to buy all London bridges between Hammersmith and Waterloo bridges and free them from tolls. In 1879, Albert Bridge, which had cost £200,000 to build, was bought by the Board of Works along with Battersea Bridge for a combined price of £170,000 (about £18.3 million in 2025). The tolls were removed from both bridges on 24 May 1879, but the octagonal tollbooths were left in place, and today are the only surviving bridge tollbooths in London.

== Structural weaknesses ==
In 1884 the Board of Works' Chief Engineer Sir Joseph Bazalgette conducted an inspection of the bridge and found that the iron rods were already showing serious signs of corrosion. Over the next three years the staying rods were augmented with steel chains, giving it an appearance more closely resembling a conventional suspension bridge, and a new timber deck was laid, at a total cost of £25,000 (about £2.69 million in 2025). Despite these improvements Bazalgette was still concerned about its structural integrity, and a weight limit of five tons was imposed on vehicles using the bridge.

With a roadway only 27 feet (8.2 m) wide and subject to weight restrictions from early on, Albert Bridge was ill-suited to the advent of motorised transport in the 20th century. In 1926 the Royal Commission on Cross-River Traffic recommended demolition and rebuilding of the bridge to carry four lanes of traffic, but the plan was not carried out because of a shortage of funds in the Great Depression. It continued to deteriorate, and in 1935 the weight limit was reduced to two tons.

Because of its ongoing structural weaknesses, in 1957 the London County Council proposed replacing Albert Bridge with a more conventional design. A protest campaign led by John Betjeman resulted in the withdrawal of the proposal, but serious concerns about the integrity of the bridge continued. In 1964 an experimental tidal flow scheme was introduced, in which only northbound traffic was permitted to use the bridge in the mornings and southbound traffic in the evenings. The bridge's condition continued to deteriorate, however, and in 1970 the Greater London Council (GLC) sought and obtained consent to carry out strengthening work. In April 1972 the bridge was closed for the work to be carried out.

=== Pedestrianised park proposal ===
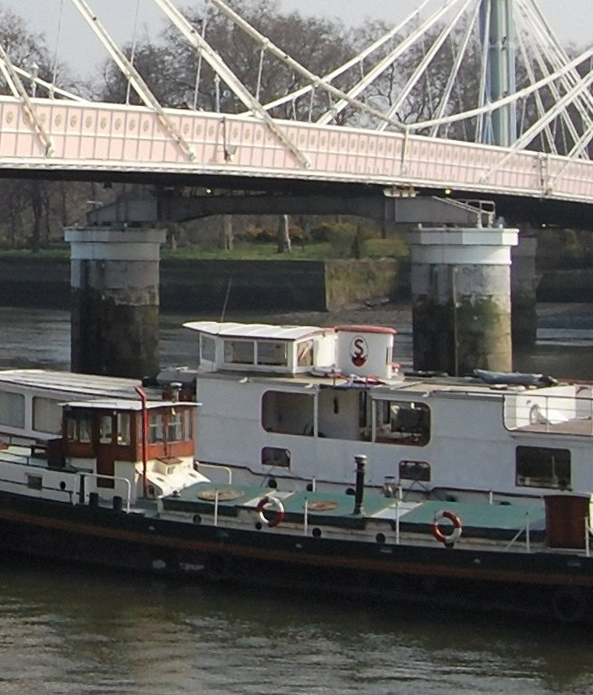
Concrete central piers were added in 1973, making the bridge an unusual hybrid of a cable-stayed bridge, suspension bridge and beam bridge.

The GLC's solution entailed adding two concrete piers in the middle of the river to support the central span and thus transform the bridge's central section into a beam bridge. The bridge's main girder was also strengthened, and a lightweight replacement deck was laid. The modifications were intended to be a stopgap measure to extend the bridge's life by five years while a replacement was being considered; in the GLC's estimation the modifications would have a maximum lifespan of 30 years, but the bridge would need to be either closed or replaced well before then.

In early 1973, the Architectural Review submitted a proposal to convert Albert Bridge into a landscaped public park and pedestrian footpath across the river. The proposal proved very popular with the area's residents, and a May 1973 campaign led by John Betjeman, Sybil Thorndike and Laurie Lee raised a petition of 2,000 signatures for the bridge to be permanently closed to traffic. Although the GLC reopened the bridge to traffic in July 1973, it also announced its intention to proceed with the Architectural Review scheme once legal matters had been dealt with. (Note: A modified form of the Architectural Review design was used in 1999 for the Green Bridge, carrying Mile End Park over Mile End Road in East London.)

The Royal Automobile Club campaigned vigorously against the pedestrianisation proposal. A publicity campaign fronted by actress Diana Dors in favour of reopening the bridge was launched, whilst a lobbying group of local residents led by poet Robert Graves campaigned in support of the GLC's plan. Graves's campaign collected over a thousand signatures in support, but was vigorously attacked by the British Road Federation, who derided the apparent evidence of public support for the scheme as "sending a lot of students around to council flats [where] most people will sign anything without knowing what it is all about". A public inquiry of 1974 recommended that the bridge remain open to avoid congestion on neighbouring bridges, and it remained open to traffic with the tidal flow and two-ton weight limit in place.

== 20th and 21st century ==
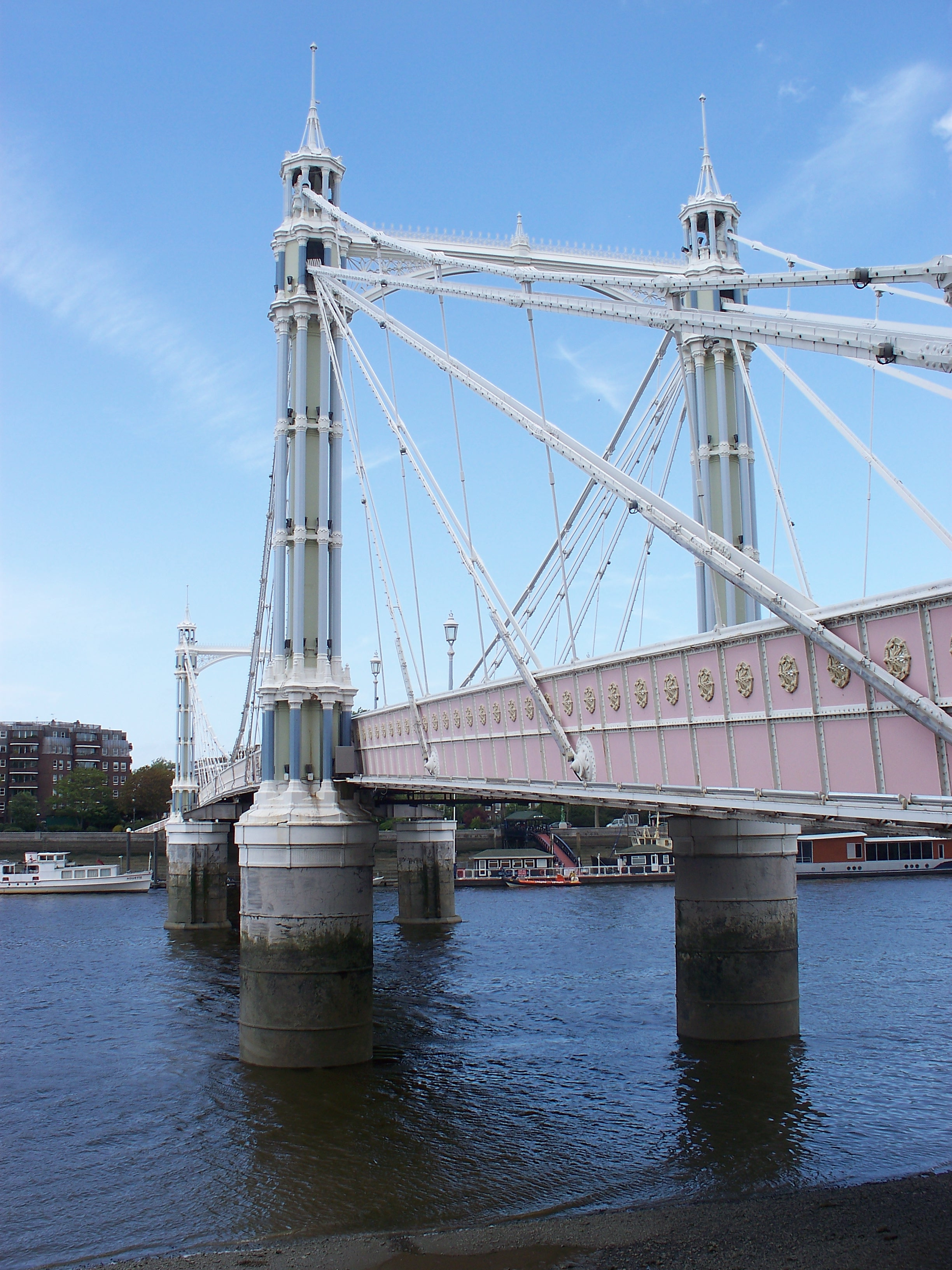
The unusual colour scheme is intended to increase visibility to shipping in poor lighting conditions.

In 1990, the tidal flow system was abandoned and Albert Bridge was converted back to two-way traffic. A traffic island was installed on the south end of the bridge to prevent larger vehicles from using it. In the early years of the 21st century the Chelsea area experienced a growth in the popularity of large four-wheel drive cars (so-called Chelsea tractors), many of which were over the two-ton weight limit; it was estimated that one third of all vehicles using the bridge were over the weight limit. In July 2006 the 27-foot (8.2 m) wide roadway was narrowed to a single lane in each direction to reduce the load. Red-and-white plastic barriers have been erected along the roadway in an effort to protect the structure from damage by cars.

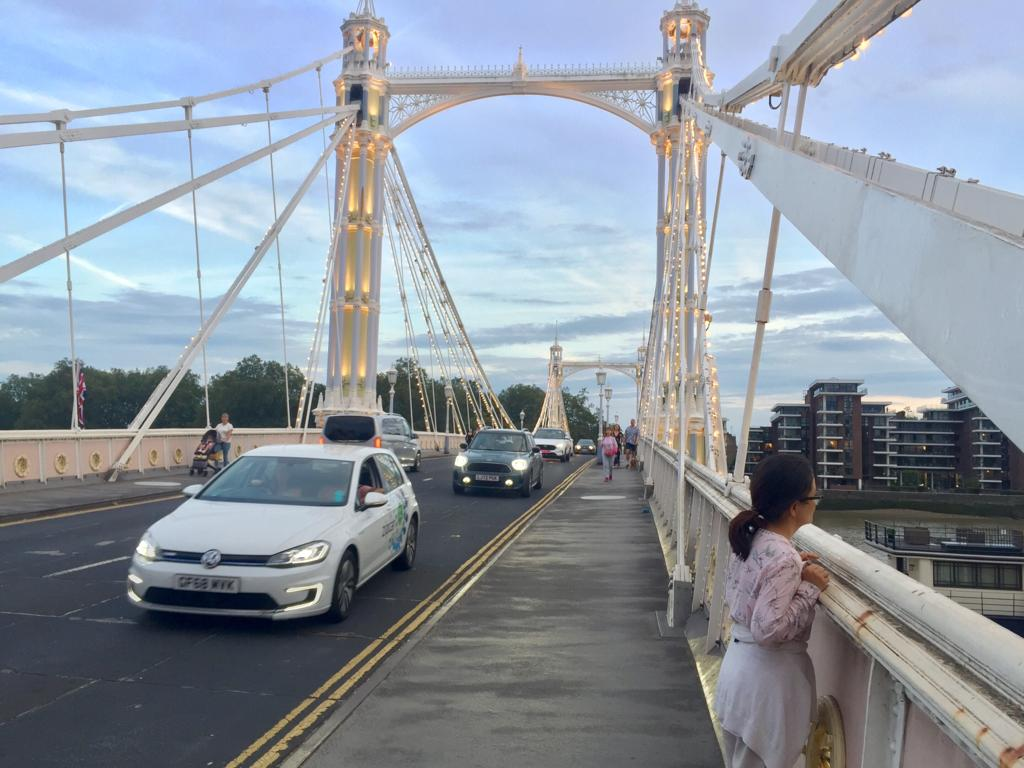
Albert Bridge from the Chelsea front, September 2023

Between 1905 and 1981, Albert Bridge was painted uniformly green; in 1981 it was repainted yellow. In 1992 it was redecorated and rewired. This has added to its status as a London landmark. The bridge is painted in pink, blue and green to increase visibility in fog and murky light and thus to reduce the risks of ships colliding with the fragile structure during the day. At night, a network of 4,000 low-voltage tungsten-halogen bulbs illuminated the bridge. In 1993 the innovative use of long-life low-energy lighting was commended by Mary Archer, at the time Chairwoman of the National Energy Foundation.

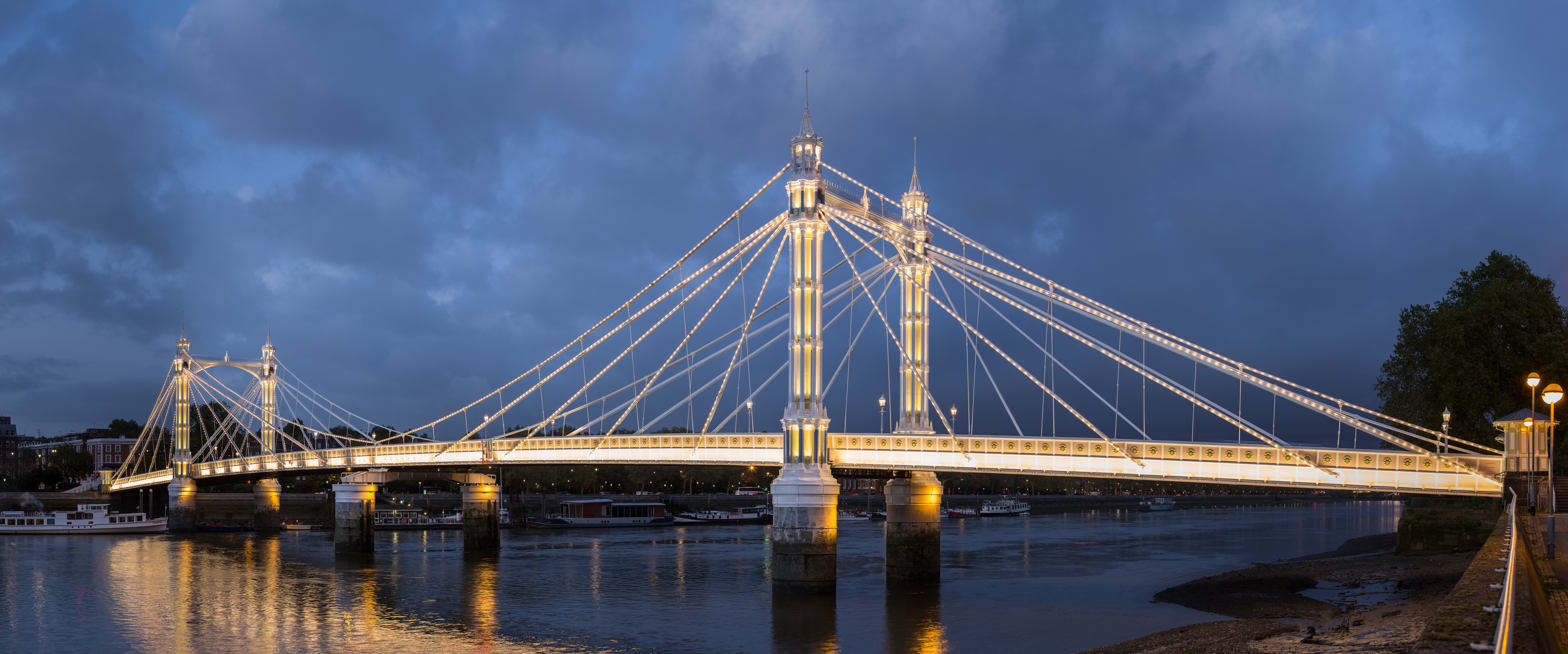
4,000 bulbs illuminate Albert Bridge at night

Except for Tower Bridge, built in 1894, Albert Bridge is the only Thames road bridge in central London never to have been replaced. Intended as a temporary measure to be removed in 1978, the concrete central piers remain in place, and although in 1974 its lifespan was estimated at a maximum of 30 years, the bridge is still standing and operational. The Albert Bridge was protected as a Grade II* listed structure in 1975, granting it protection against significant alteration without consultation. It continues to deteriorate. Although proposals have been drawn up by Kensington and Chelsea London Borough Council to repair and rescue it, by March 2008 funds for the repairs were unavailable. As well as structural damage caused by traffic, the timbers underpinning the deck were being seriously rotted by the urine of dogs crossing to and from nearby Battersea Park. (Note: Because of the lack of large open spaces on the north side of the river in this area, large numbers of dogs cross daily to be walked in Battersea Park.) With multiple measures in place to reduce traffic flow and prolong the life of the bridge, in 2009 it carried approximately 19,000 vehicles per day, the lowest usage of any Thames road bridge in London other than the little-used Southwark Bridge.

=== Refurbishment of 2010–2011 ===
The bridge was closed to motor vehicles on 15 February 2010 for refurbishment and strengthening. It was originally expected to remain closed for approximately 18 months, but after the condition of the bridge was found to be worse than expected, it was closed for 22 months. All of the timbers in the decking as well as the footway that had rotted away were replaced, with additional timber added for strengthening. Surfaces at the carriageway and pavement decking were replaced. New steel structures were added to strengthen the bridge. All the lightbulbs were changed to more energy-efficient ones. The tollbooths were refurbished. All twelve layers of paint were stripped down until the bare metal was exposed, which was repaired and treated before three new coats of paint were added. The whole project cost £7.2 million, of which the Royal Borough of Kensington and Chelsea provided 25%, the other 75% being provided by Transport for London.

It re-opened on 2 December 2011, when two dogs named Prince and Albert, from nearby Battersea Dogs and Cats Home, walked across the bridge to open it officially. All of the Grade II features were retained.

=== Weight restriction and closures ===
A three-ton weight restriction was introduced in 2012, with enforcement action for the restriction commencing on 11 January 2024. In May 2025, the bridge shut for essential maintenance, with this being the third closure in the last year, causing disruption to the 20,000 vehicles that were using the bridge each day. On 9 February 2026 the bridge closed to vehicle traffic as a precautionary measure, after concerns were raised subsequent to an inspection. It was briefly closed to pedestrians and cyclists in April 2026 following detection of 'movement', but reopened to them two days later after being judged safe. A cast iron component on one of the bridges abutments was cracked, with it anticipated that the bridge may be closed for as long as a year. The estimated cost to fix the bridge is £8.5 million.

== See also ==
- Albert Bridge, Datchet, Berkshire, over the Thames
- List of bridges in London
- List of crossings of the River Thames
