= College for Civil Engineers =

London engineering college

The College for Civil Engineers in Putney, Southwest London, was one of the earliest educational establishments to teach civil engineering.

== History ==
A private college, it was founded in 1839 and initially based in Gordon House in Kentish Town but was relocated to two riverside mansions, Putney House and The Cedars, in Putney in August 1840. Fully titled as the College for Civil Engineers and of General, Practical and Scientific Education, it was established under the presidency of the Duke of Buccleuch, for the purpose of affording sound instruction in the theory and practice of civil engineering and architecture.

At the time, the civil engineering profession tended to prefer pupillage routes and was sceptical about the quality of the engineers educational establishments produced. A lengthy 1840 article in The Civil Engineer and Architects' Journal (reproduced in Mechanics' Magazine and Journal of Science, Arts, and Manufactures) condemned the College venture as "ridiculous" and a "clumsy imitation of the Polytechnic School" (presumably the Royal Polytechnic Institution, founded in 1838), before concluding:

We have been influenced by no prejudice against the college or its objects, but we feel that we have best done our duty both to it and our readers, by unsparingly denouncing what we consider an erroneous and inefficient system of education, and a certain delusion to those who have the misfortune to be its victims.

The college was not a financial success and closed during the 1850s - sources variously suggest 1851, 1852 or 1857 - though local records suggest the college was demolished sometime before 1853.

== Notable teachers ==
- David T. Ansted (professor of geology, from 1845)
- Oliver Byrne (professor of mathematics, 1839-1841)
- Samuel Clegg (professor of civil engineering and architecture from 1849)
- Sir Edward Frankland (chair of chemistry, c. 1847)
- John Arthur Phillips (professor of metallurgy, 1848 to 1850)
- Sir Lyon Playfair (professor of chemistry)

== Notable students ==
- Frederick Arnold
- James B. Cook
- Parkin Jeffcock
- Sir Guilford Molesworth
- Edward Selby Smyth
- Henry Palfrey Stephenson
- George Vesey Stewart
- John Lorenzo Young
