= William Henry Le Feuvre =

English engineer

William Henry Le Feuvre (1832–1896) was an English engineer, born on the island of Jersey. He was president of the Society of Engineers in the United Kingdom, and lent his name to the Ordish-Lefeuvre system for cable-stayed bridges.
