= Solomon Sopher =

Baghdadi Jewish leader

Solomon F. Sopher was the president of the Baghdadi Jewish community in Mumbai, India. He also served as the Trustee of the David Sassoon Fund, and as the chairman and managing director of Sir Jacob Sassoon Trust, which manages the Knesset Eliyahoo synagogues in Mumbai, as well as the Magen David Synagogue in Byculla, South Mumbai and the Ohel David Synagogue in Pune, India.

== Institutional activities ==
Solomon Sopher was also involved as a trustee and the Chairman of various other Jewish institutions like E.E.E. Sassoon High School, Sassoon Guest House, David Sassoon Library, Lady Rachel Sassoon Dispensary, Sassoon Dock, Indian Jewish Federation, etc. He was known as a very prominent and active Jewish leader. He made possible bringing prominent people including Prime Ministers of Israel Benjamin Netanyahu, Ehud Olmert, Ehud Barak, Yitzhak Rabin, Indian politicians Sonia Gandhi, Sharad Pawar, Manohar Joshi, Balasaheb Thakeray, Dr. Zakir Hussain, and celebrities such as Madonna, Britney Spears, Michael Jackson, Rachel Bilson, Kate Winslet and many others to the synagogue with which he was involved.

== Death ==
Sopher's death was announced on 3 November 2026. Israel's ambassador to India, Reuven Azar, said Sopher's "contribution to India’s Jewish heritage will be remembered for generations".

== See also ==
- Synagogues in India

== Bibiography ==
- A REPORT ON MY VISIT TO INDIA by Mordechai Ben-Porat
- Israeli advisory has put Indian Jewish community on alert - DNAIndia.com
