= Ohel David Synagogue =

Synagogue in Pune, India

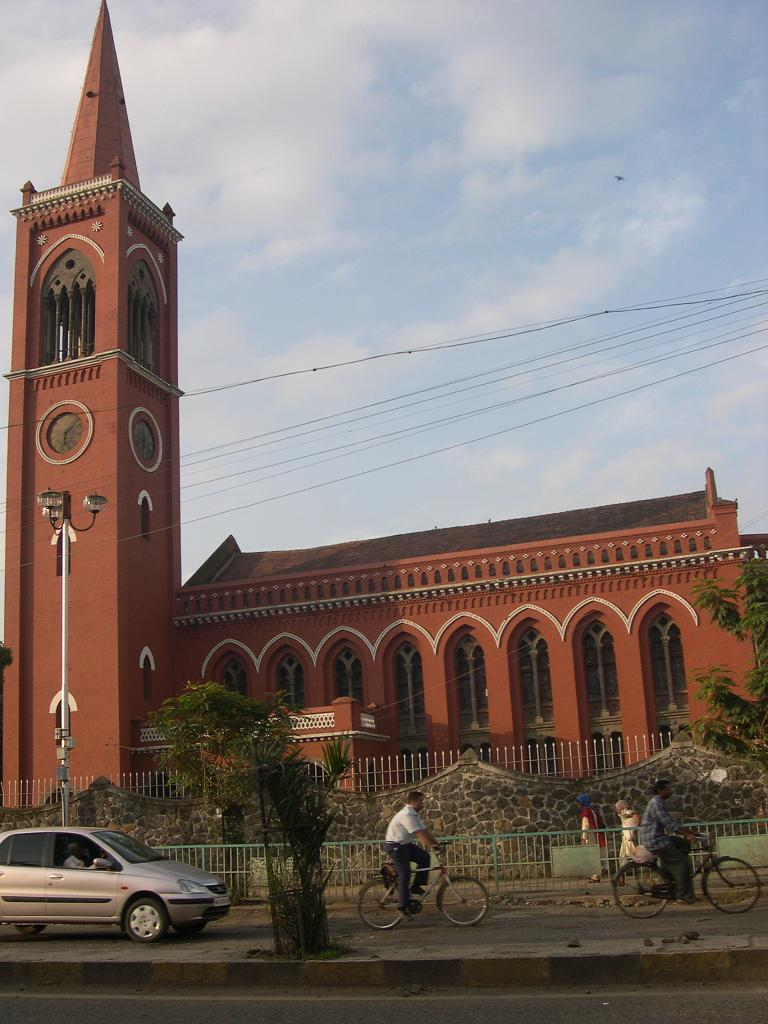

- Location of the synagogue in Maharashtra

Religion
- Affiliation: Judaism
- Ecclesiastical or organizational status: Synagogue
- Year consecrated: 1867
- Status: Active

Location
- Location: Moledina Grant Road, Camp, Pune, Maharashtra
- Country: India
- Interactive map of Ohel David Synagogue
- Coordinates: 18°31′09″N 73°52′29″E

Architecture
- Architect: Henry Saint Clair Wilkins
- Type: Synagogue architecture
- Style: English Gothic
- Funded by: David Sassoon
- Groundbreaking: 1863
- Completed: 1867
- Spire height: 27 m (90 ft)

Ohel David (Tabernacle of David) Synagogue, also called Laal Deval or Laal Deul is a synagogue in Pune, India.

== History ==
The construction of the synagogue started in 1863 by philanthropist David Sassoon and was then completed by his successors in 1867. The synagogue was designed by Henry Saint Clair Wilkins and was an example of English Gothic architecture. The churchlike building was constructed with red brick and trap rock and has a 90-foot tall obelisk with a clock brought especially from London. One of the largest synagogues built in India, Ohel David (Hebrew for Tent of David), constructed from 1863 to 1867, is located on a prominent site on Moledina Road near M. G. and Ambedkar Roads. This area came to be known as Pune Camp (or Cantonment), a military district established in 1817 to accommodate troops of the British Indian Army. For years the landmark synagogue, which has ably served the city's Baghdadi-Jewish community for about a century-and-a-half, has been known locally as Laal Deul (Red Temple). "Laal" is the Marathi word for "Red" as a reference to the brilliant color of the building's exterior brick. "Deul" is the Marathi word for "Temple". The construction of the synagogue and its endowment were made possible by David Sassoon, patriarch of the great Sassoon dynasty that made its mark in trading, commerce, and shipping in India and the East during the nineteenth and early twentieth century. The Sassoons funded the construction of many other religious, civic, and institutional buildings in the city and elsewhere in India, including Pune's Sassoon Hospital and Mumbai's Baghdadi synagogues Knesset Eliyahoo and Magen David Synagogue (Byculla).

David Sassoon was born in Baghdad and immigrated to India during the early years of the nineteenth century. The first Baghdadi Jews to come to India did so seasonally or temporarily in the late eighteenth century, arriving first in the western port city of Surat. In time, a permanent enclave was formed in Pune with others in Mumbai, Kolkata, and Yangon (Rangoon) in Myanmar (Burma). Jewish people mostly from Iraq, but also from Iran and various other countries under the control of the Ottoman Empire, left their homelands in search of religious tolerance, economic opportunity, and quality of life. The community as a whole became comparatively well-educated and economically comfortable in their adopted Indian and Burmese cities. Pune came to offer the Baghdadis affiliated with this synagogue the chance to become fully practicing Jews and productive citizens of the broader local community.

== Description ==
A building distinctly of the English Gothic-revival style, Ohel David was designed by the British colonial architect Henry Stain Clair Wilkins. Wilkins was a British army officer, served in the East India Company, and was employed in the fields of architecture and engineering in the public works departments of British India. Working with Wilkins, the Ohel David congregation, like other Baghdadi communities, chose an architectural style developed in England or other parts of Europe and revived in the nineteenth century as a precedent for their houses of prayer. When seeing these synagogues for the first time, foreigners and nationals alike may be surprised by what they can regard as buildings appearing un-Indian and Christian. Yet in the British colonial landscape, these imposing Baghdadi structures were in keeping with the tastes of the British and their allegiances at the time, which included much of the Baghdadi Jewish community.

Magen David sits on a relatively large open site that is now surrounded by a high protective wall. Today this site offers a peaceful respite from congested and noisy areas of the city. Abutting the main brick and Deccan trap stone massing of the building is the synagogue's most prominent feature: a ninety-foot tall square tower featuring a clock with faces on each of the tower's sides. This clock was manufactured in London specifically for Ohel David. The tower, detailed with Gothic-style pointed-arched openings and capped by a steeply pitched slate roof, closely matches the design of the one at Sassoon Hospital, also designed by Henry Wilkins.

The synagogue sanctuary is a large and impressive space able to accommodate a membership that, at its height, numbered over one hundred families. In plan, the generous central nave with its tebah (bimah/raised platform containing a table for reading the Torah) is separated from the side aisles by a colonnade. Positioned above the side aisles is a gallery where, in the Orthodox Jewish tradition of separating the genders, the women sat. Tall windows with transoms filled with a geometric pattern of stained glass, a gray marble tiled floor, the raised tebah with wooden newel posts/handrail and brass balusters, plaster medallions and trim work, and the wooden guardrail at the gallery are prominent design features in the sanctuary. The wooden ceiling of the sanctuary is flat, and hanging from it are period lighting fixtures. Filling the sanctuary, as in Baghdadi and other Indian synagogue design traditions, are freestanding long wooden benches and chairs.

Ohel David follows the pattern of other Baghdadi synagogues in India and Myanmar with a particularly impressive architectural feature: a sizeable heckal (ark) that is raised a few feet above the level of the sanctuary floor. The heckal, positioned on the wall nearest to Jerusalem as per synagogue convention, is set within a double-height niche that is elaborately embellished with plaster decoration. Framing the heckal at the sanctuary side is a pointed arch flanked by engaged pilasters, and they are also highly decorated with plaster reliefs. From within the sanctuary, the heckal curtain and doors appear to front a conventional, cabinet-like space. Yet once they are opened, a walk-in apsidal-shaped room as deep as ten feet (three meters) and considerably wider is revealed. Here one hundred or more Torah scrolls placed within decorated silver cases were once proudly displayed.

The Ohel David Synagogue compound also contains a now-closed mikvah (a place of ritual baths), caretaker and community apartments, and the Gothic-revival mausoleum of David Sassoon (also designed by Wilkins), who died in Pune in 1864 before Ohel David was consecrated on 29 September 1867. As a consequence of social and political change during the second half of the twentieth century, Ohel David's congregation today is considerably smaller and less active than it once was. In recent years, the synagogue is guarded, and access to the building is controlled. Despite these changes, the synagogue continues to remain open and vital. Regular prayer and holiday services are held here, conducted by congregational laymen, a hazan (reader/cantor), or visiting rabbi. Tourists and other visitors can also arrange to be invited, and for these reasons, the synagogue is more than ever an integral part of Pune's Jewish identity as well as a testament to the city's tradition of religious and social diversity and tolerance.

Lal Deval is Asia's largest synagogue (outside Israel).

== Gallery ==
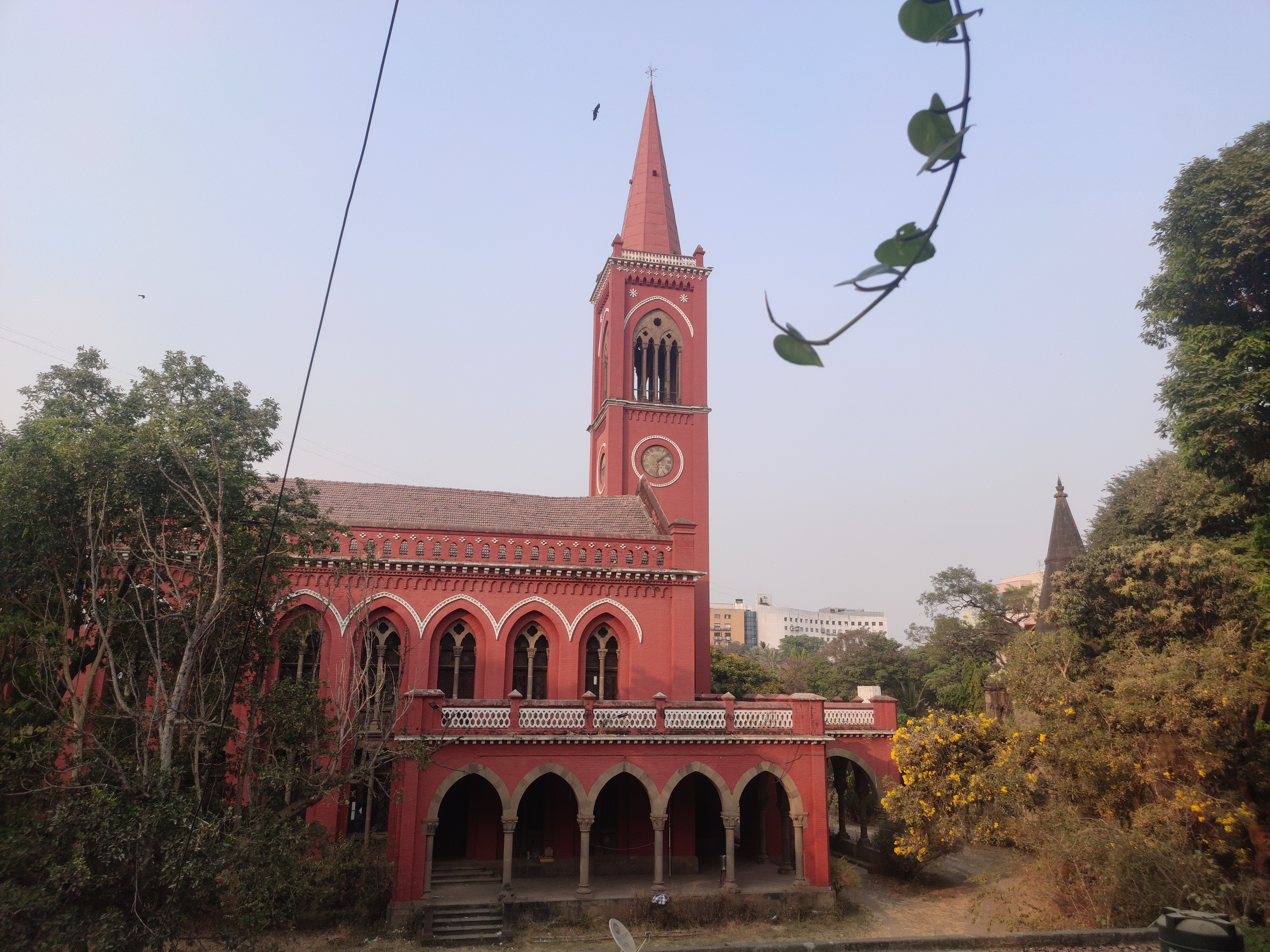
Rear of the building

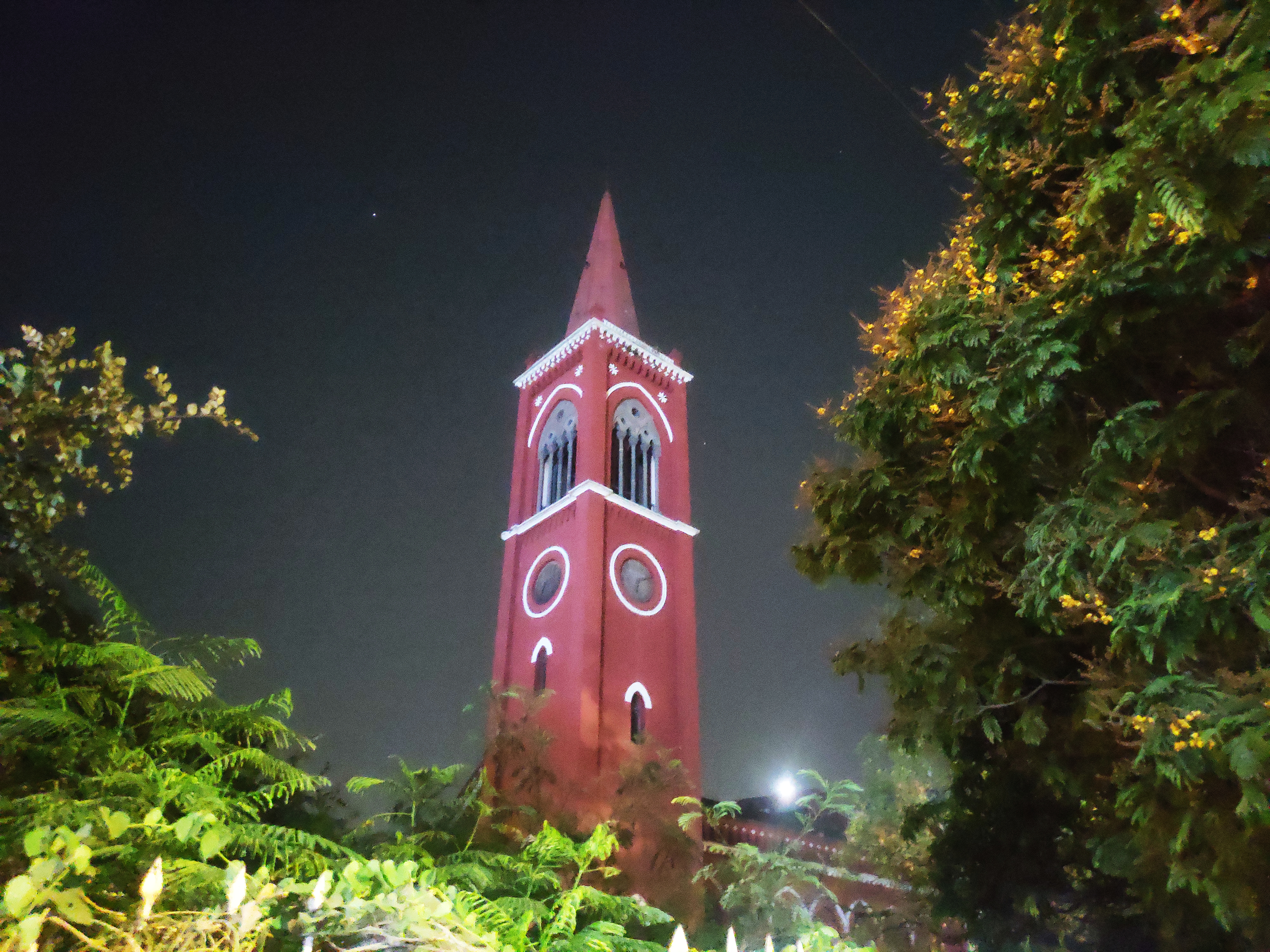
At night

== See also ==
- History of the Jews in India
- List of synagogues in India
