= General Wilkins =

General Wilkins may refer to:

- Henry St Clair Wilkins (1828–1896), British East India Company general
- John Wilkins Jr. (1761–1816), Allegheny County Militia brigadier general
- Michael Wilkins (Royal Marines officer) (1933–1994), Royal Marines lieutenant general
- William Walter Wilkins (born 1942), South Carolina National Guard brigadier general
