= Henry St Clair Wilkins =

British architect and army officer of the East India Company

General Henry St Clair Wilkins
- Born: December 3, 1828
- Died: December 15, 1896 (aged 68) Queen's Gate, South Kensington, London
- Buried: Brookwood Cemetery 51.314°N 0.575°W
- Allegiance: United Kingdom
- Branch: Bombay Engineers
- Service years: 1847–1882
- Rank: General
- Commands: Royal Engineers
- Conflicts: Aden Campaign, Abyssinian Campaign
- Awards: Abyssinian War Medal
- Education: Addiscombe Military Seminary
- Spouse: Violet McIntyre (m. 1856)

General Henry St Clair Wilkins (3 December 1828 – 15 December 1896) was a British army officer who served the East India Company in India, Aden and later in Abyssinia. He was also a noted architect and is credited with having designed several buildings.

== Biography ==
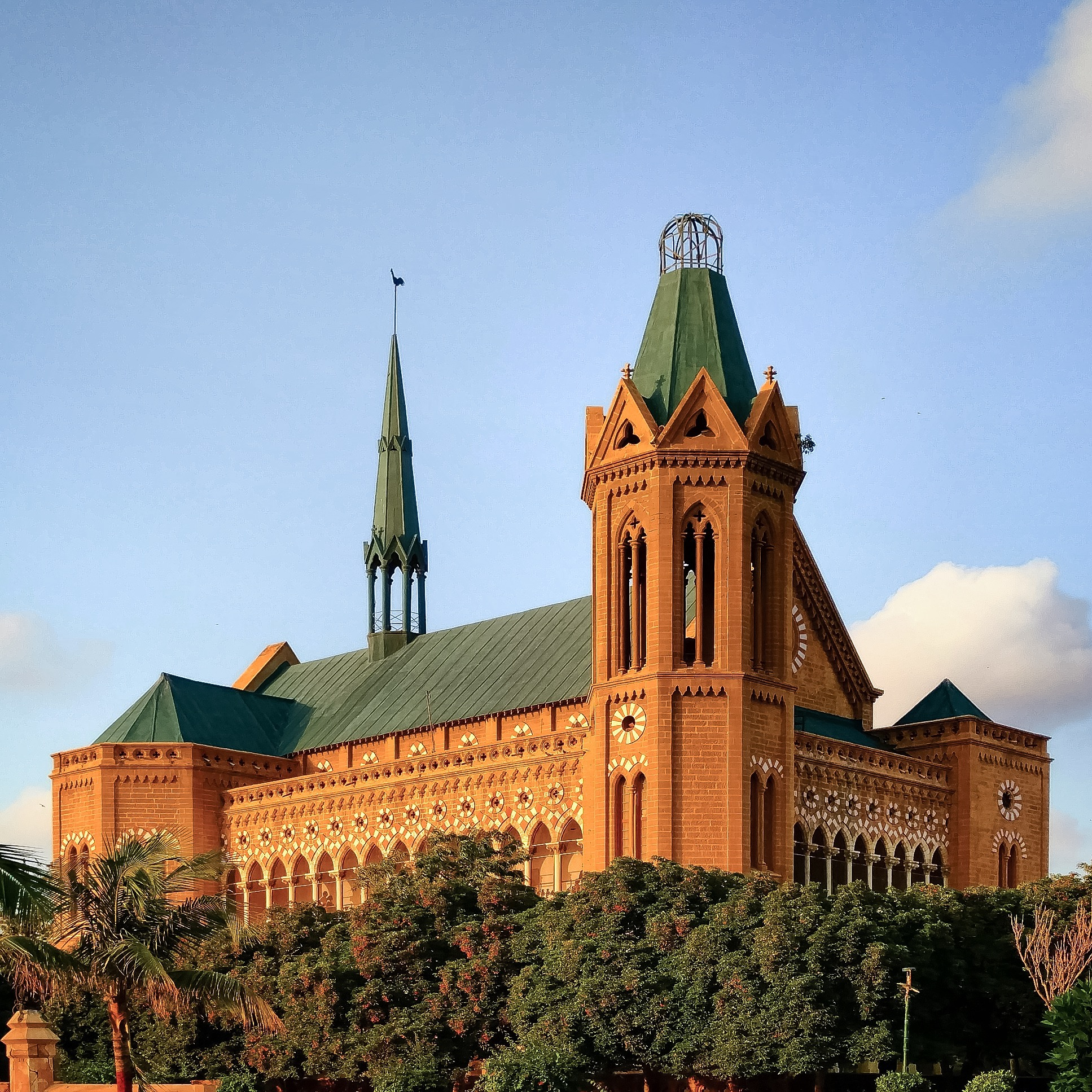
Frere Hall is one of Karachi, Pakistan's most iconic sights, and was designed by Wilkins

He was the son of George Wilkins, Archdeacon of Nottingham and was born on 3 December 1828. After passing through the military college of the East India Company at Addiscombe he received a commission as lieutenant in the Bombay Engineers on 11 June 1847. He was promoted as captain in 1858, lieutenant-colonel in 1867, colonel in 1868, major-general in 1877, lieutenant-general in 1878 and finally as a general in 1882, when he retired.

He served with the field force from Aden against the Arabs in 1858. He commanded the Royal Engineers throughout the Abyssinian campaign of 1868, and was mentioned in dispatches by Lord Napier of Magdala for his 'invaluable and important services during the expedition. He was appointed aide-de-camp to Queen Victoria, with the rank of colonel in the army, and received the medal.

An accomplished draughtsman and artist, Wilkins was employed in architectural and engineering works in the public works department of British India, and his designs were remarkable for their fitness and beauty.

Among them may be noted:

- at Aden, the restoration of the ancient tanks in the Tawella Valley, dating from about 600 A.D.;
- at Bombay, the Government and the Public Works Secretariats (he also won the first prize in a competition with his design for the European General Hospital).
- at Poona, the Sassoon Hospital, the Deccan College, the Ohel David Synagogue, and the mausoleum of David Sassoon and other members of the Sassoon family.
- at Bhuj, the palace (Prag Mahal) of the Rao of Kach.
- at Bhejapur in Orissa, the restoration and adaptation of ancient buildings to the requirements of a new station.

== Author ==
Wilkins published the following books:-

- 'Reconnoitring in Abyssinia,’ 1868;
- 'The Indian Civil Engineering College: Remarks', 1871;
- 'Report on the state and requirements of the Kurrachee harbour works', Sind Public Works Deptt. 1878;
- 'A Treatise on Mountain Roads, Live Loads, and Bridges,’ 1879.

== Death ==
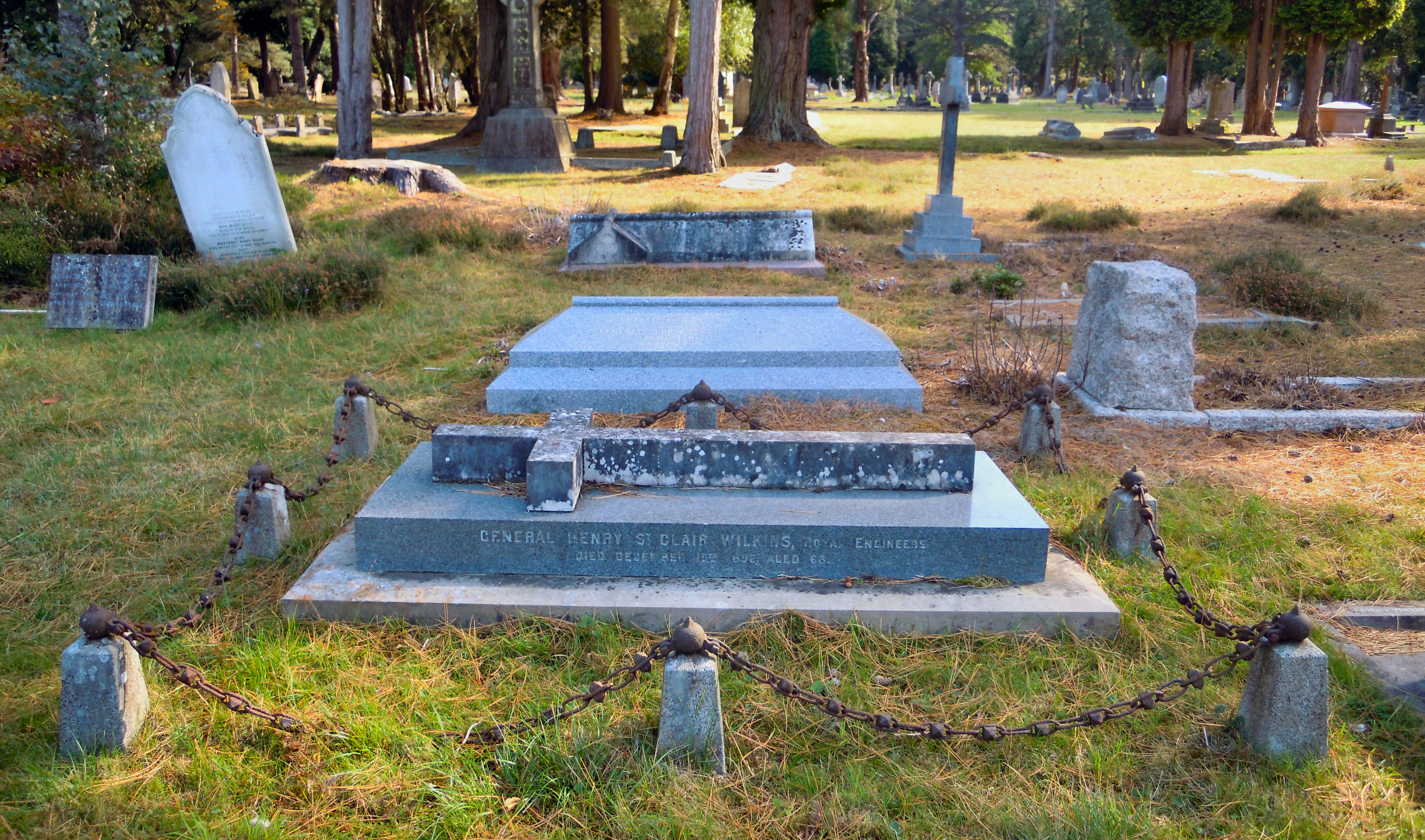
The grave of Henry Saint Clair Wilkins in Brookwood Cemetery

He died suddenly on 15 December 1896 at his residence at Queen's Gate, South Kensington. Wilkins was married in 1856 to Violet, daughter of Colonel Colin Campbell McIntyre, C.B., of the 78th Highlanders. He is buried with his wife in Brookwood Cemetery in Surrey.

== Gallery ==
Architecture by Wilkins:

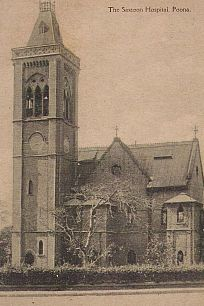
Sassoon Hospital built in 1867.

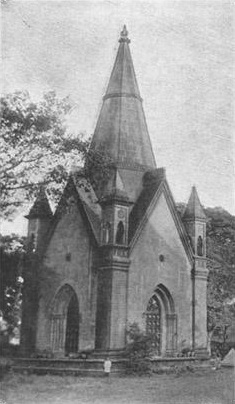
Tomb of David Sassoon, 1864.

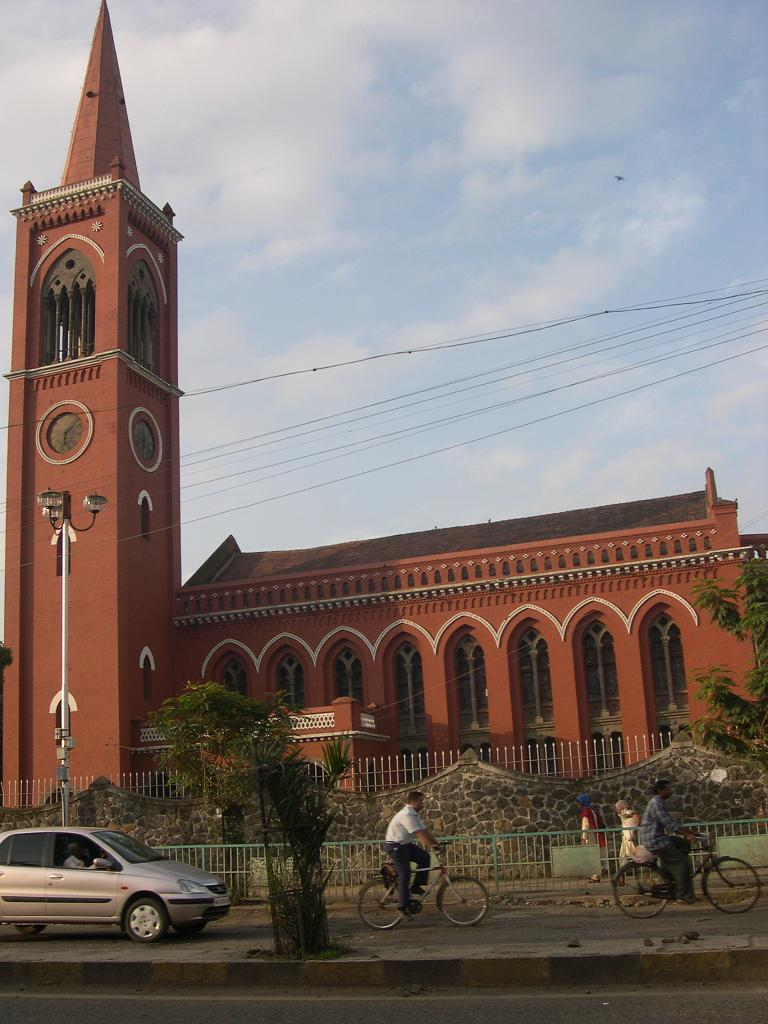
Ohel David Synagogue, 1867.

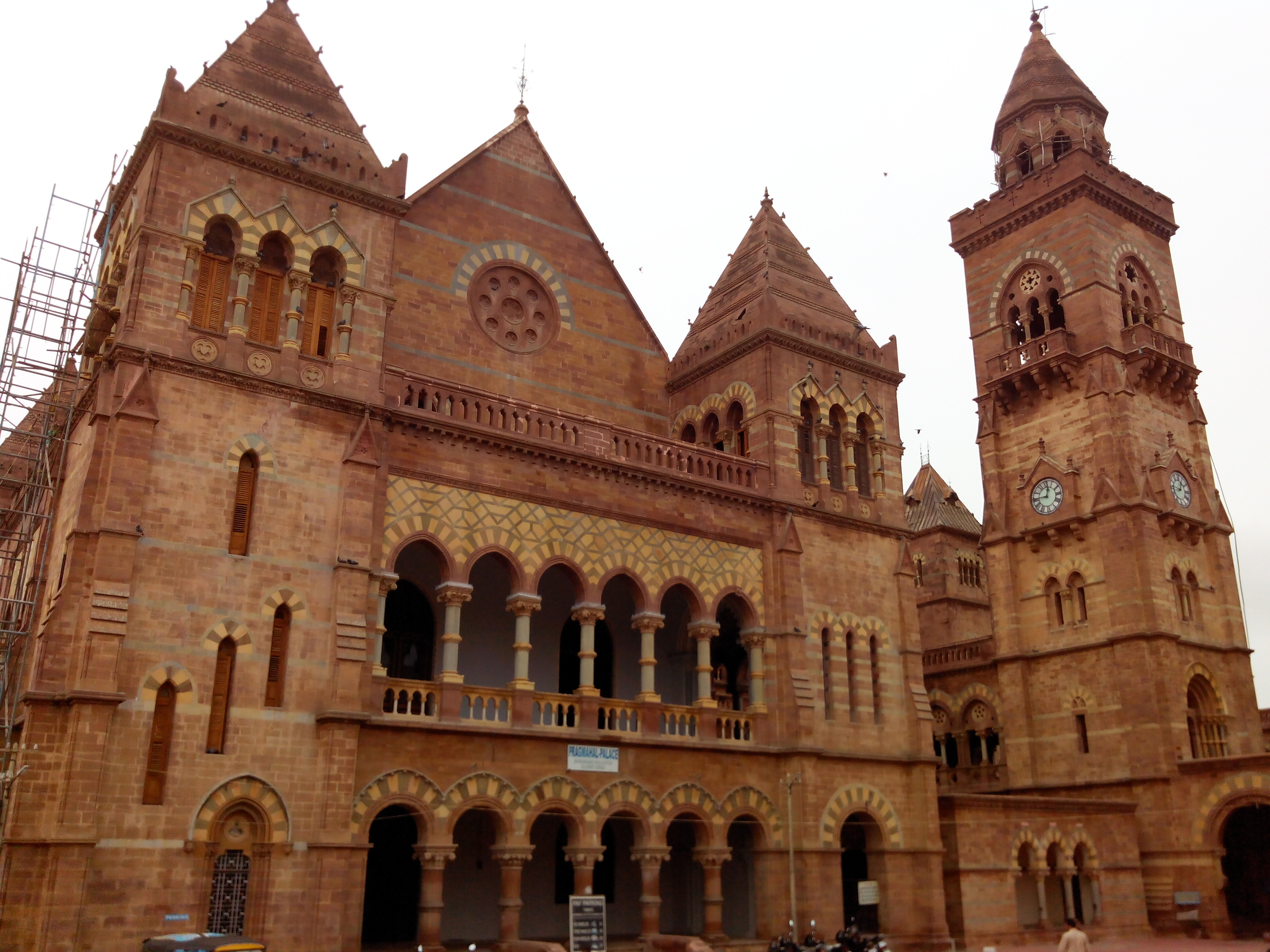
Prag Mahal at Bhuj completed in 1879.

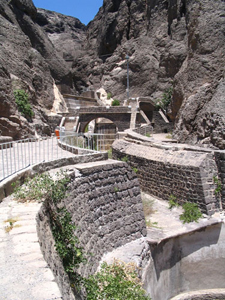
Cisterns of Tawila restoration work 1895–96
