= Masina Hospital =

Hospital in Mumbai, India

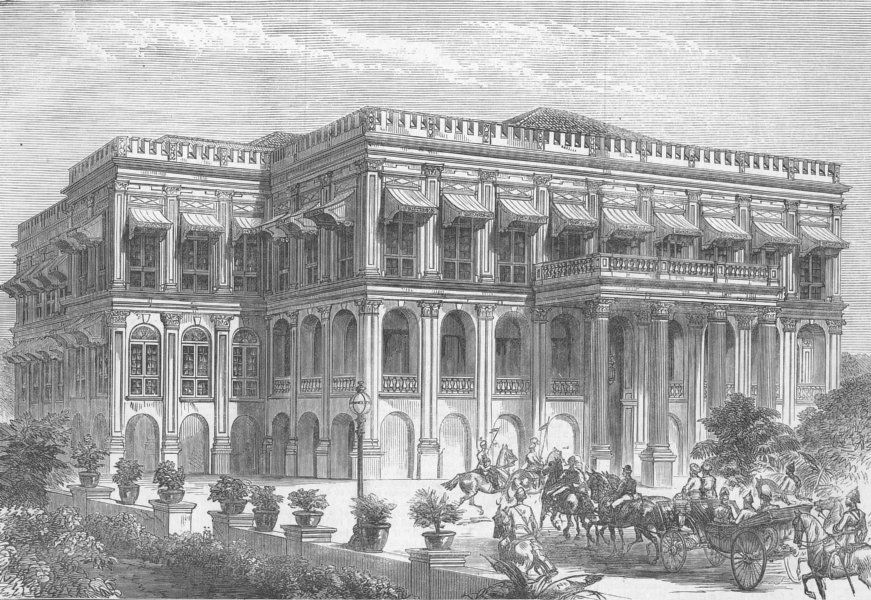
The Prince of Wales visited David Sassoon's house Sans Souci, on 17 November 1875

Masina Hospital, located in the heart of Mumbai, India, is a medical hospital belonging to the eponymous trust. Built in memory of Jerbai Masina by her family and descendants, this hospital is a well-known landmark in Byculla (East). The building was the palatial residence of the wealthy Jewish businessman, David Sassoon, who had been mayor of Baghdad and later made great contributions to the city of Bombay. The property was his residence from the time he arrived from Baghdad.

== Departments ==
Masina Hospital has been well known for many years for its Burns Center, the Eric Kharas Burns Unit, run by its Plastic Surgery Department, headed by Dr. A.M. Vartak. Masina Hospital is also known as one of the first private hospitals to start a sick newborn unit, or the "Premature Baby Unit", under the stewardship of Dr. Mrs. Maharukh Joshi, now retired. The present Neonatal Intensive Care Unit (NICU) is located in a different building within the complex of Masina Hospital, but it is run by the Department of Pediatrics and Neonatology, headed by Dr. Mrs. S.H. Mullan. This Premature Unit has often received babies from as far away as 300–500 km from Mumbai at one time. The Department of Psychiatry and the Orthopaedics department also provide treatment in the same campus.

Apart from these, Masina Hospital has Obstetrics and Gynecology, General Medicine, General Surgery, Ophthalmology, Dermatology, Neurology, Cardiology, Endocrinology and so on.

The most recent accomplishment has been the establishment of a full-fledged blood bank with a fractionation unit in the city. The psychiatry department of the hospital is credited with being the only private hospital in the city with a tertiary care psychiatry ward, where patients are treated for as many as two years.

Run by a Parsi trust, many of the patients that seek expensive medical care are often given 90% or even 100% concession and allowed to be treated completely free of cost.
