= Shreevatsa (Pune) =

Orphanage in Pune, Maharashtra, India

Shreevatsa is a care centre for the family deprived children which is located in Pune, a city in Maharashtra a western Indian state. The centre offers its orphans for adoption. It is operated by "Society of Friends of Sassoon Hospitals", a charitable organisation associated with Sassoon Hospital, Pune. The centre was established on 6 October 1973, the day of Vijayadashami. 2574 of its orphans were legally adopted into families between 1974 and 2009.

On 5 July 2011, Women and Child Welfare Department of the government of Maharashtra inspected its premises. Four unwed pregnant women were found illegally housed in the centre. It is considered that unwed mothers would be prone to abandon babies, therefore centres that offer its residents for adoption are not allowed to provide lodging for unwed pregnant women. The centre had its licence to work as an adoption agency temporarily suspended by the Central Adoption Resource Authority in June 2012, in response to complaints regarding overcharging of fees.

In 1982, documentary and feature film director Prakash Jha created a documentary film Shree Vats about the centre. The film has interviews of adoptive families in it.

== Notable former orphans ==
- Former Australian international female cricketer Lisa Sthalekar.
