= Sassoon Hospital =

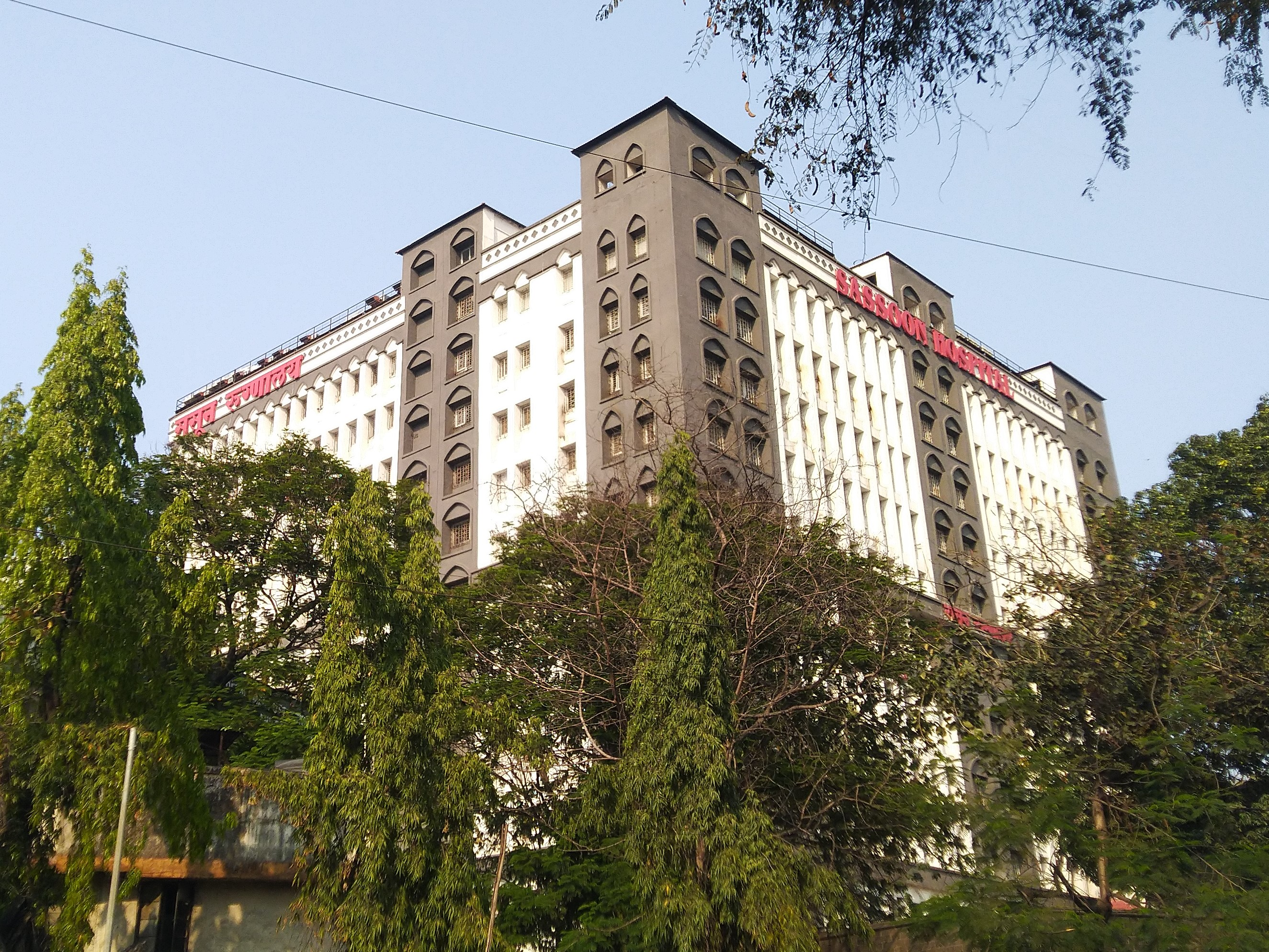

- shown in Pune, Maharashtra

Geography
- Location: Pune, Maharashtra, India
- Coordinates: 18.52571°N 73.87194°E

Organisation
- Type: General
- Affiliated university: Byramjee Jeejeebhoy Government Medical College

Services
- Beds: 1296

History
- Founded: 1867

Links
- Website: http://bjmcpune.org/
- Lists: Hospitals in India

Sassoon General Hospital (Marathi: ससून सर्वोपचार रुग्णालय) is a large state-run hospital in Pune, India with over 1500 beds. The B. J. Medical College, Pune and a Nurses training School is attached to it.

== History ==
The Jewish philanthropist David Sassoon from Mumbai made a generous donation to make the construction of the hospital possible in 1867. The hospital could originally accommodate 144 patients.

In 1906 the foundation stone for another hospital building, the Jacob Sassoon Hospital was laid and it opened in 1909. It was funded by Sir Jacob Sassoon, son of Elias Sassoon, great-nephew of David and the 1st Baronet of Bombay. It was built to relieve pressure on the original hospital. Six panels of tiles depicting nursery rhymes and five of fairy tales were installed to amuse and distract sick children; they were designed by Margaret Thompson and manufactured by Royal Doulton.

== Society of Friends of Sassoon Hospitals ==
A well-respected child-care center and orphanage, Society of Friends of Sassoon Hospitals (SOFOSH), is connected to the hospital. SOFOSH was started in August 1964 by a group of Pune citizens for the welfare of poor patients of Sassoon Hospitals. Child care activities were initiated in 1973. SOFOSH's child care center, "Shreevatsa", has provided a home to orphan children ranging from newborns to six-year-olds. Many of the children are placed with adoptive families in India and overseas. A number of children are physically and mentally challenged and a growing number are afflicted by life-threatening ailments. Many of these children will never find adoptive families, and are cared for by the SOFOSH "Preetanjali" project. This also helps kids from ages 0–6 get a home in their orphanage care system; they have been matching adults up with children for 32 years now.

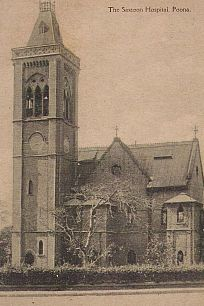
Original building, built in 1867 designed by Colonel Wilkins.

== Famous patients ==
- Meher Baba was born in Sassoon Hospital on 25 February 1894.
- Hazrat Babajan was treated at Sassoon Hospital on 18 September 1931.
- Raman Raghav, aka Psycho Raman, an infamous Indian serial killer, died at Sassoon Hospital in 1995.
- Mahatma Gandhi received an appendectomy at Sassoon Hospital on 12 January 1924.
- Meena Kumari was admitted to Sassoon Hospital after her car accident while returning from Mahabaleshwar on 21 May 1951.
