= Sassoon Docks =

Port in Maharashtra, India

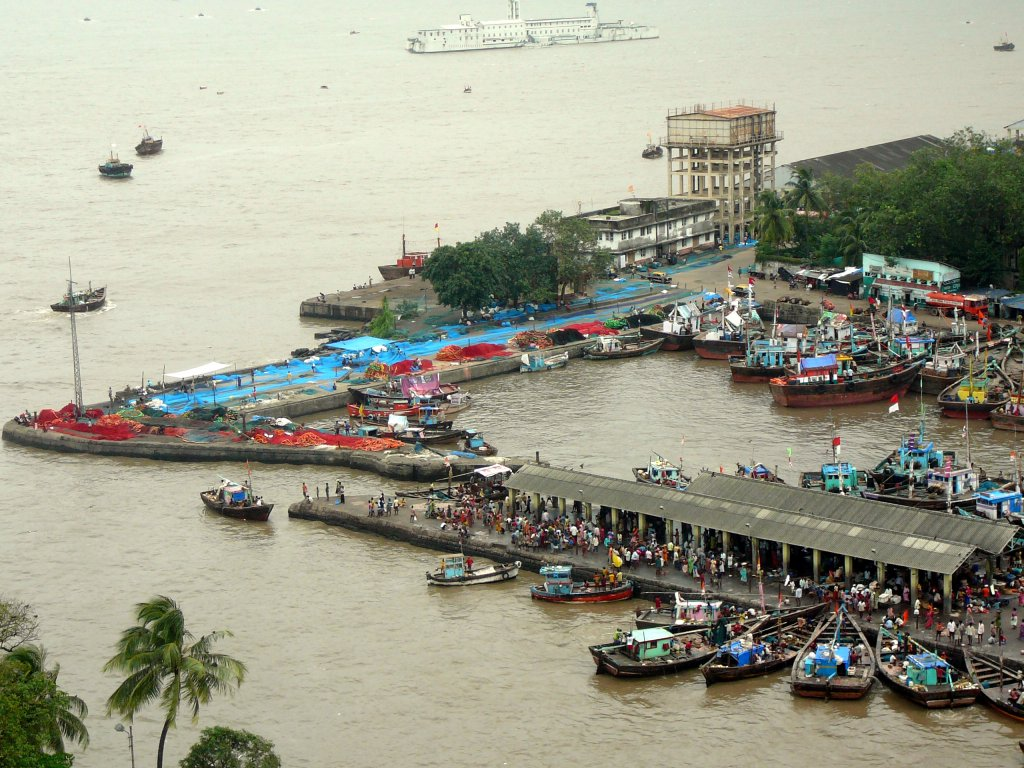
- Aerial view of Sassoon Docks
- Interactive map of Sassoon Docks
- Location within Mumbai

Location
- Country: India
- Location: Mumbai
- Coordinates: 18°54′41.81″N 72°49′34.11″E

Details
- Opened: 1875
- Owned by: Mumbai Port Trust
- Type of Harbor: Fishing port
- No. of wharfs: 7

Sassoon Docks, built in 1875, is one of the oldest docks in Mumbai and was the first wet dock constructed in Bombay. It is one of the few docks in the city open to the public. It is situated in Mumbai harbour in South Mumbai area of Colaba. It is one of largest fish markets in the Mumbai city, it has a wide variety of fishes, including Surmai (Indo-pacific mackerel), pomfret etc. Its neighbouring features are Mumbai Port Trust Garden (Sagar Upvan Colaba) and Offices of Fisheries Department, and it overlooks Oyster Rock, an island in the Mumbai harbour, at a distance.

== History ==
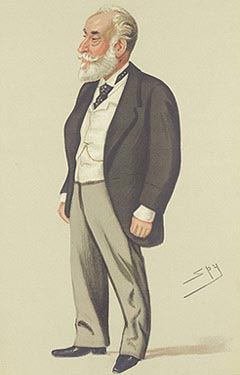
Albert Sassoon

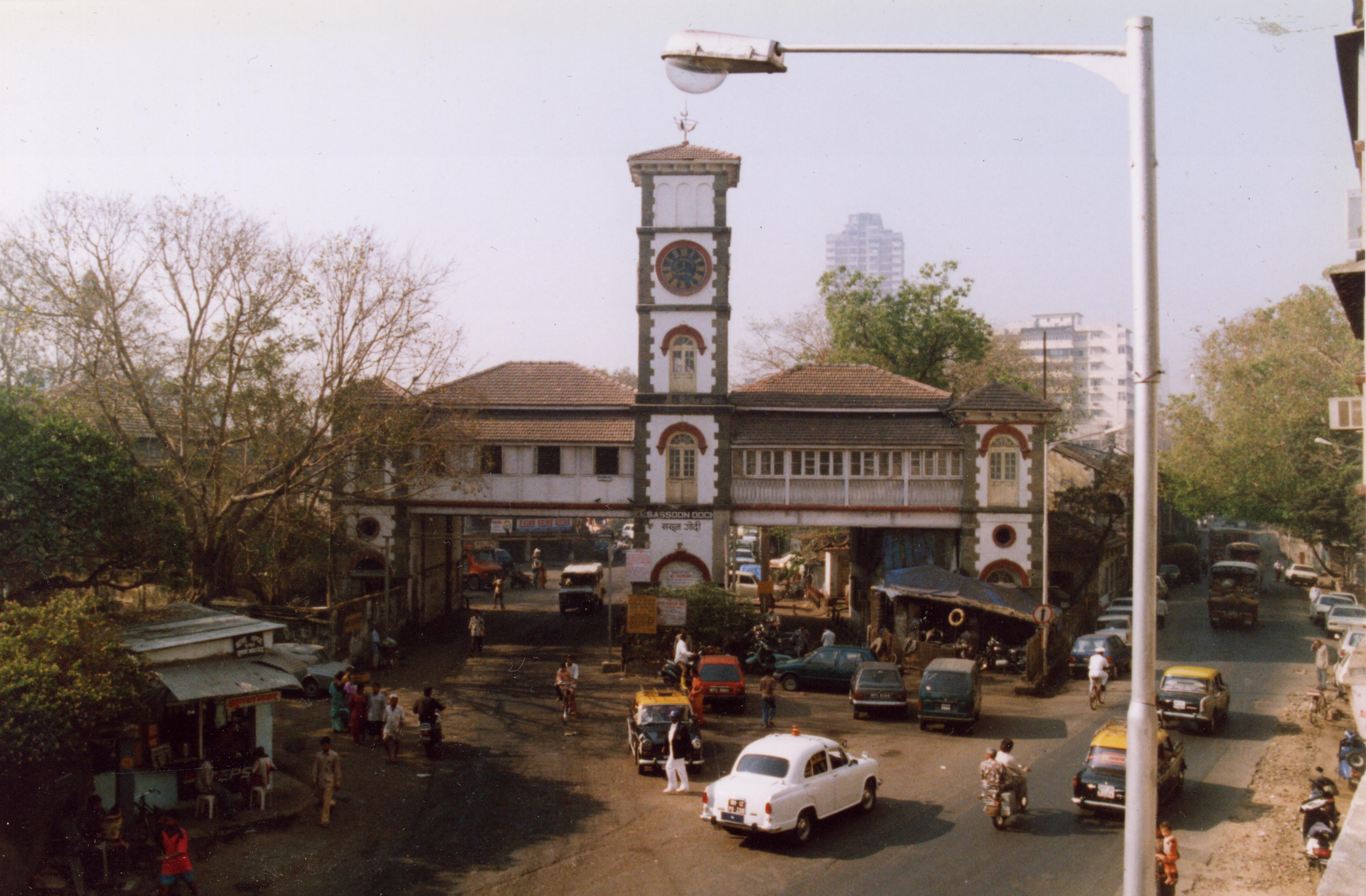
Sassoon Dock Entrance

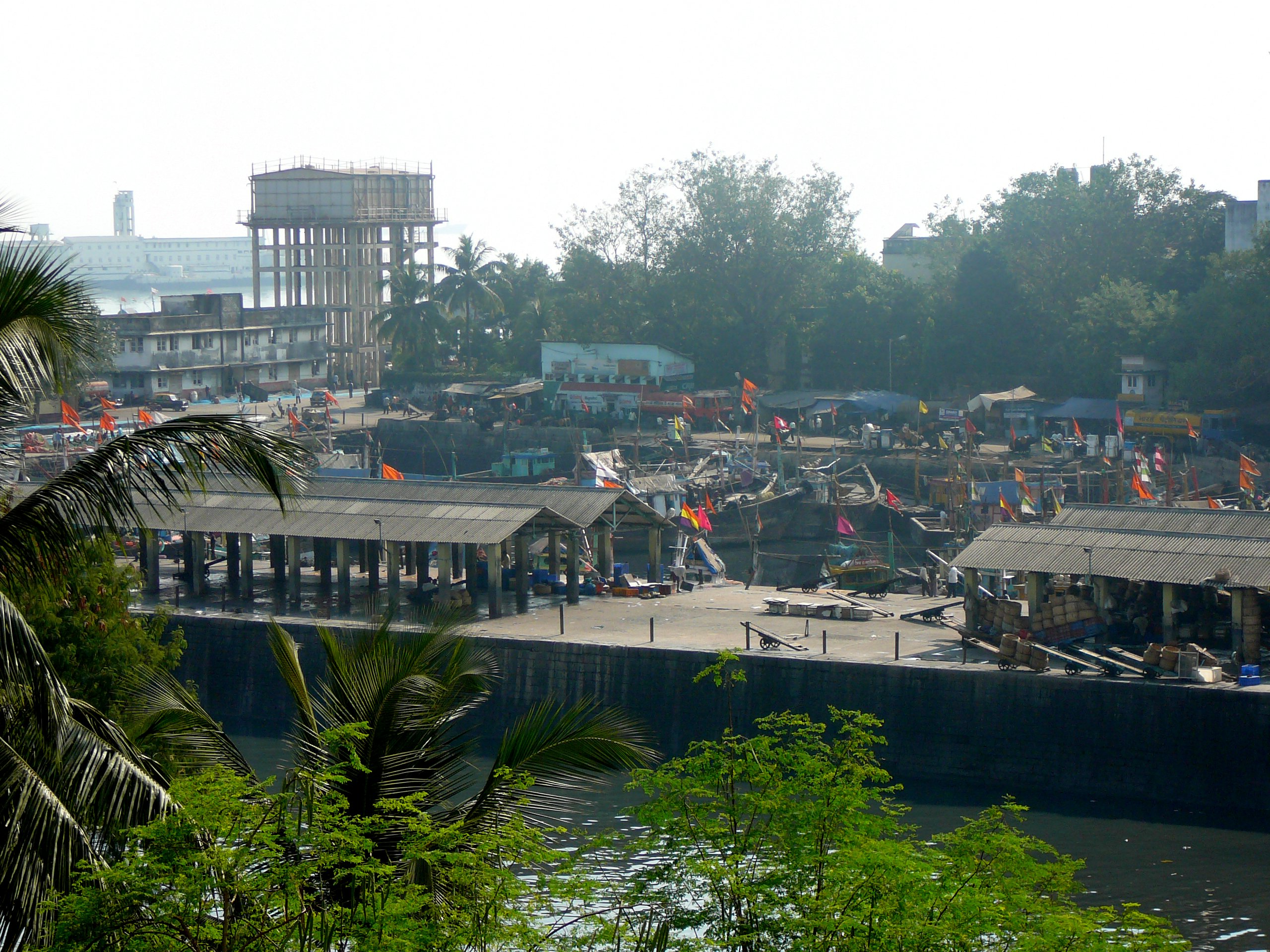
The Sassoon Docks

Sassoon Docks fishing boats in the harbor

Built in 1875 on reclaimed land, it was owned by the mercantile company David Sassoon & Co. The company was headed by Albert Abdullah David Sassoon (1818–1896), son of David Sassoon, a Baghdadi Jew and the leader of the Jewish community in Bombay. The Sassoon Docks were the first commercial wet dock in western India and helped establish the cotton trade. In 1879, Sassoon Docks and other associated foreshore properties were purchased by the government on behalf of Bombay Port Trust.

== Street art ==
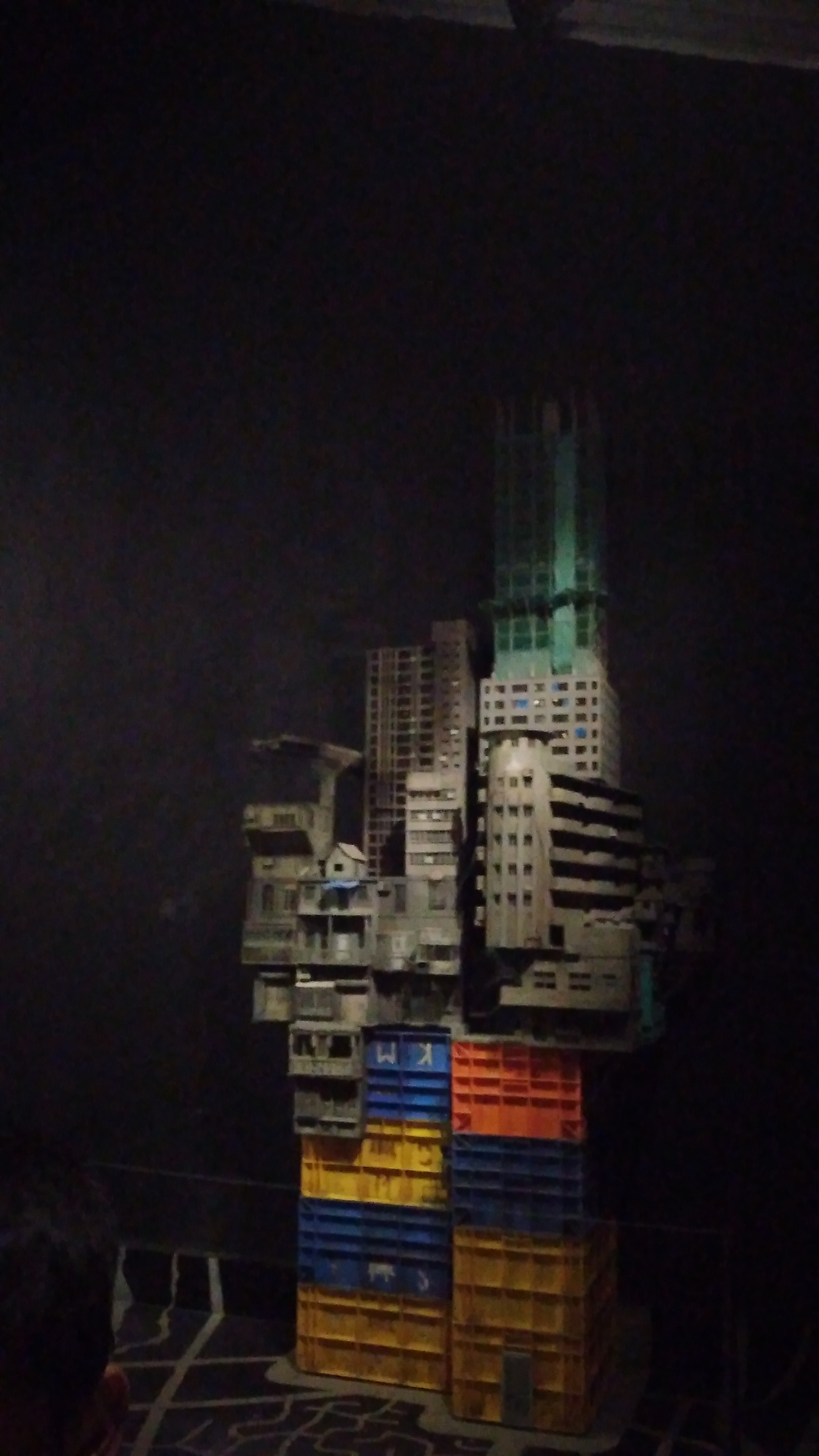
Artwork at Sassoon Docks Art Festival depicting the buildings of Mumbai.

In 2017, street art transformed one of Mumbai’s oldest fishing docks into an exhibition space. Thirty artists from around the world gave the bustling 142-year-old Sassoon Dock, a colorful makeover as part of the St+art Urban Art Festival. The exhibition opened to public on 11 November 2017. A second art exhibition was started on 22 December 2022 and went on till 22 February 2023.

== See also ==
- David Sassoon Library
