= David Sassoon Library =

Library in Mumbai, India

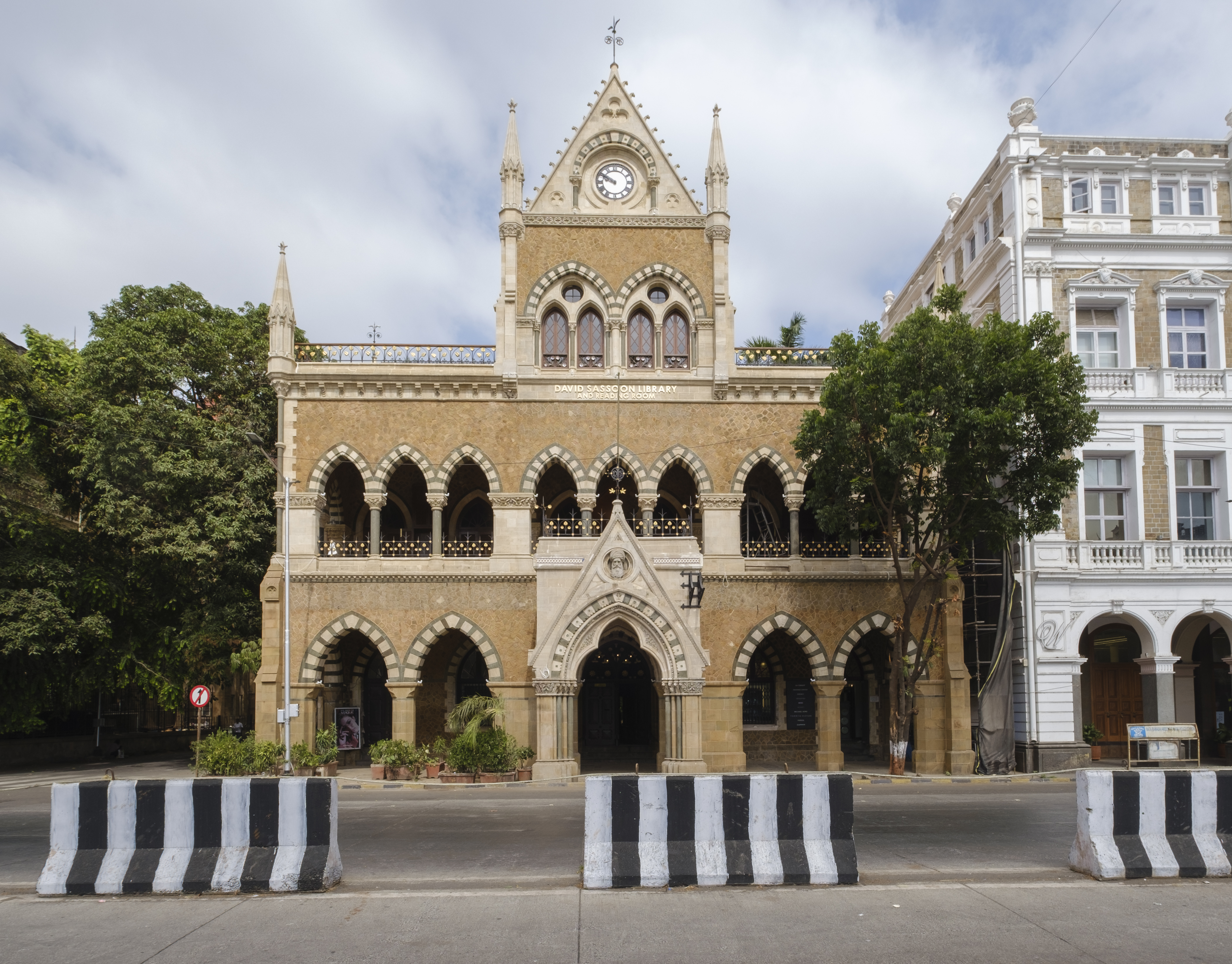
- David Sassoon Library in May 2023

- Location within Mumbai Location within India
- 18.92772°N 72.83116°E
- Type: Library
- Location: Mahatma Gandhi Road, Fort, Mumbai, India

History
- Built: 1870; 156 years ago

Site notes
- Architect(s): J. Campbell and G. E. Gosling
- Architectural styles: Gothic Revival, Venetian Gothic
- Restored: 2023; 3 years ago
- Restored by: Abha Narain Lambah Associates with JSW Foundation

UNESCO World Heritage Site
- Criteria: Cultural: (ii) (iv)
- Designated: 2018 (43rd session)
- Part of: Victorian Gothic and Art Deco Ensembles of Mumbai
- Reference no.: 1480

The David Sassoon Library and Reading Room is a famous library and heritage structure in Mumbai, India. The idea for a library to be situated in the center of the city came from Albert Sassoon, son of the famous Baghdadi Jewish philanthropist and businessman of the Sino-Indian opium trade, David Sassoon.

== History ==
In 1847, European employees working in the Government Mint and the Dockyard in Mumbai started the Mechanics' Institution to provide technical education to adults and to hold lectures. Initially, they operated from leased premises until they relocated to their own facility, which was made possible by the support of David Sassoon. Later, the establishment was named the David Sassoon Library and Reading Room.

The structure, built in the architectural style of Victorian Neogothic during the period from 1867 to 1870, maintains its original colonial allure. It features pointed arches, columns adorned with animal motifs, and intricately designed trusses and ceilings made of Burma teak wood. Now a Grade I heritage structure, the library's building is among the earliest constructions in the vicinity following the removal of the fort walls in the 1860s.

=== Historical images ===
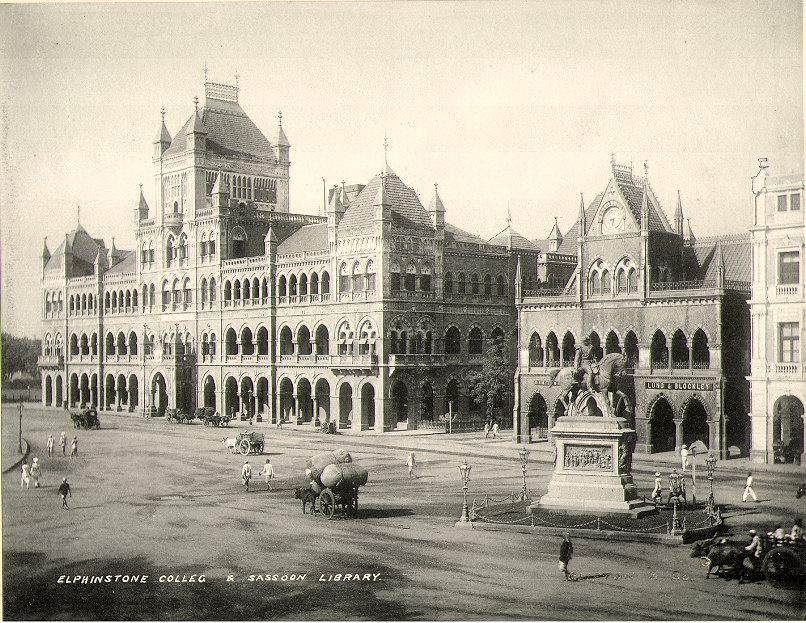
"Elphinstone College and Sassoon Library," in Bombay; a collotype print by Clifton & Co., c.1900; also *"University Library and Clock Tower"

Mechanics' Institute (now David Sasoon Library), at Bombay in India, c.1860

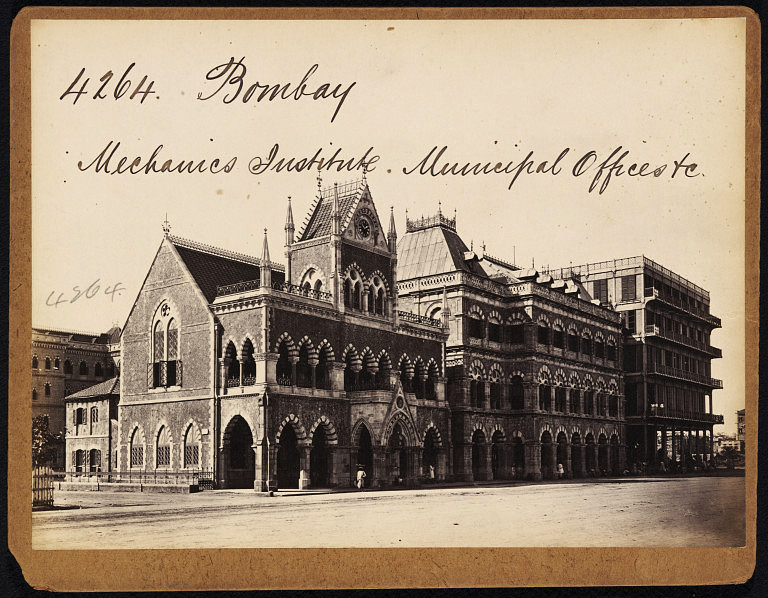
Mechanics' Institute (now David Sasoon Library), at Bombay in India, c.1870s

The building was designed by architects J. Campbell and G. E. Gosling, for Scott McClelland and Company, at a cost of Rs. 125,000. David Sassoon donated Rs. 60,000, while the rest of the cost was borne by the Government of Bombay Presidency. The library is located on Rampart Row, looking across Kala Ghoda. The building, completed in 1870, is built using yellow Malad stone, much like the abutting Elphinstone College, Army and Navy Buildings, and Watson's Hotel. Above the entrance portico is a white stone bust of David Sassoon. This marble bust was Thomas Woolner's working model for the statue of Sassoon standing at the front of the stairs of the David Sassoon Library. This standing marble statue, completed in 1865, was commissioned by Sir Bartle Frere, Governor of Bombay and personal friend of the sculptor, Woolner. Subscriptions came from the Jewish community, a myriad of traders, and friends in England.

== Restoration ==
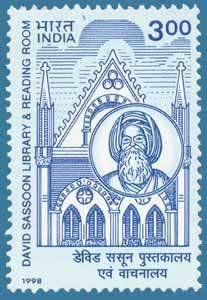
David Sassoon Library and Reading Room Stamp of India - 1998

In 2023, the JSW Foundation and the ICICI Foundation worked together on the restoration of this library. Sangita Jindal, the Chairperson of the JSW Foundation, partnered with Abha Narain Lambah, a conservation architect in India, to oversee the execution of the restoration project. In order to raise funds, they collaborated with various organisations, including Hermès India, the Kala Ghoda Association, the Consulate General of Israel in Mumbai, the MK Tata Trusts, and several others. This collaboration transformed the project into a multiparty initiative, involving multiple stakeholders working together to contribute financially.

=== Pre-restoration images ===
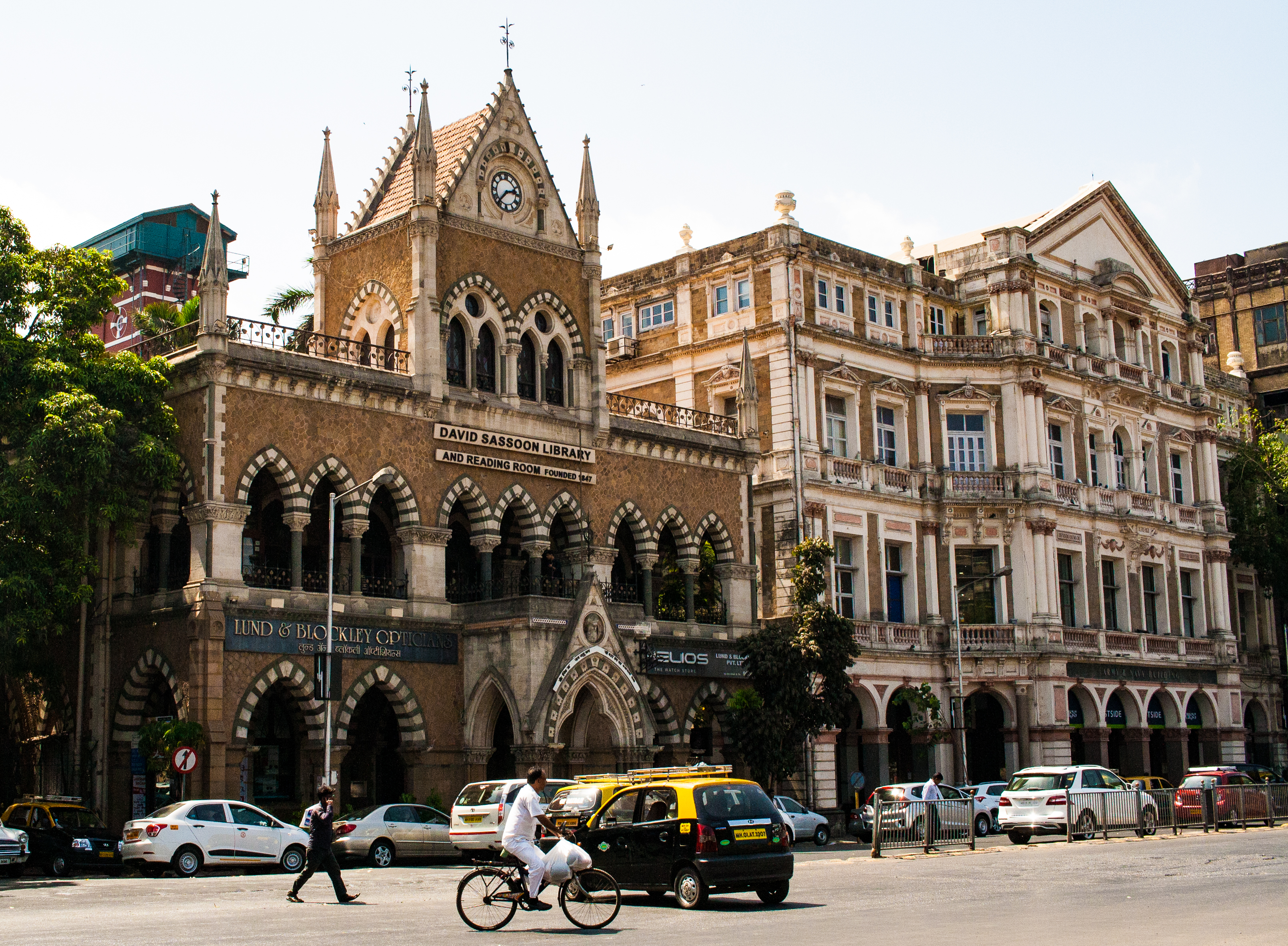
David Sassoon Library, Mumbai

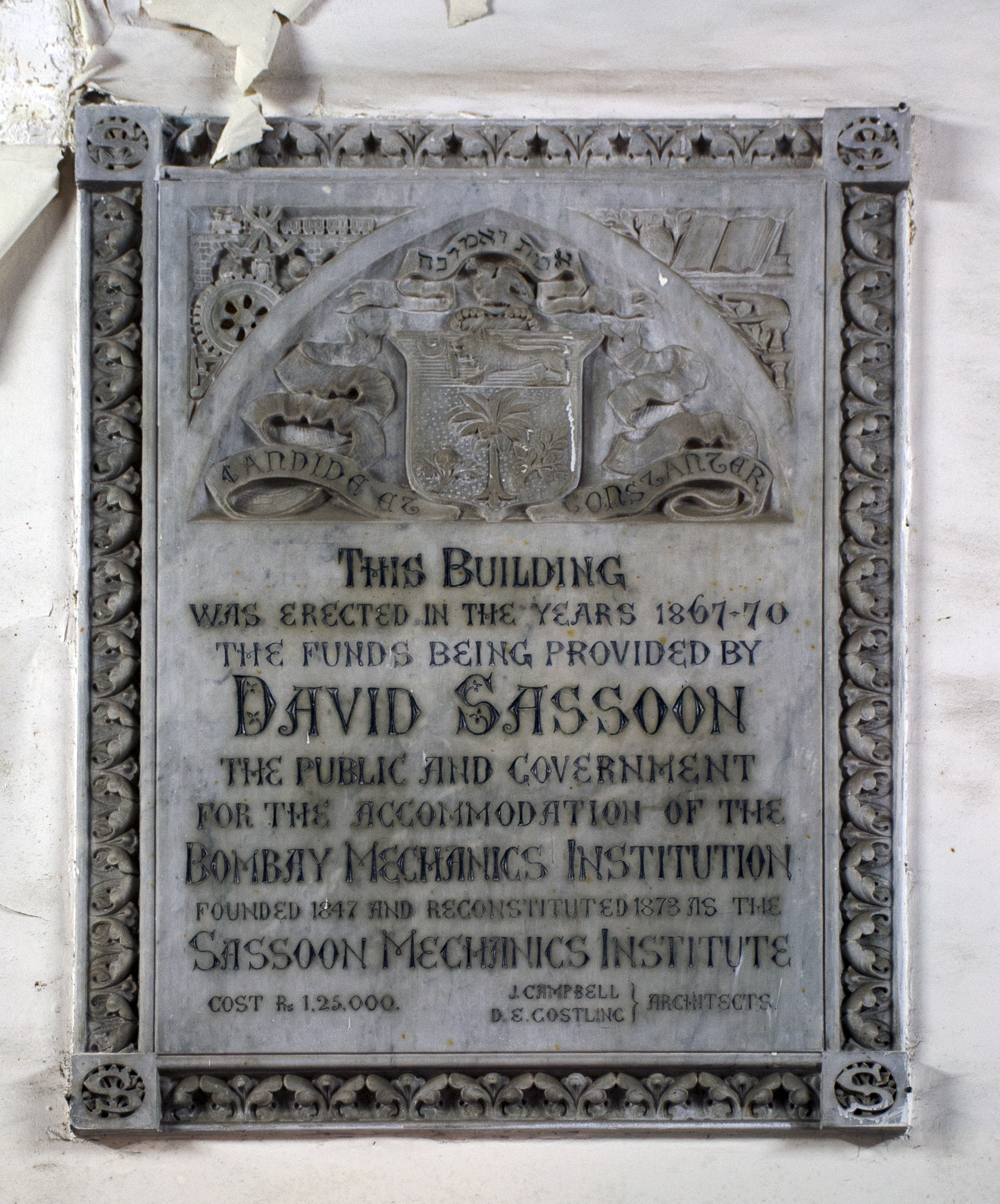
Plaque at David Sassoon Library, Mumbai

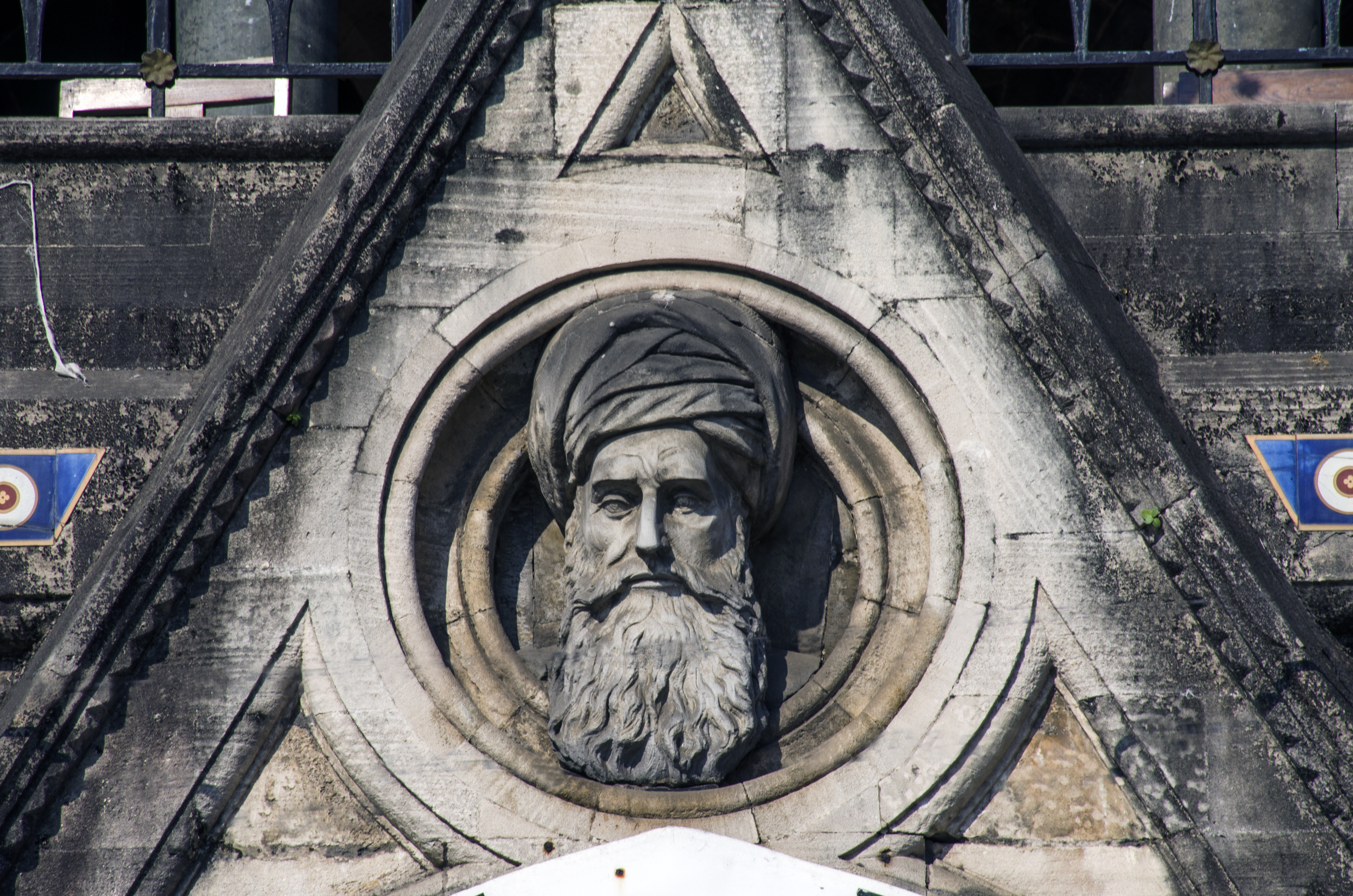
Bust of David Sassoon at David Sassoon Library, Mumbai

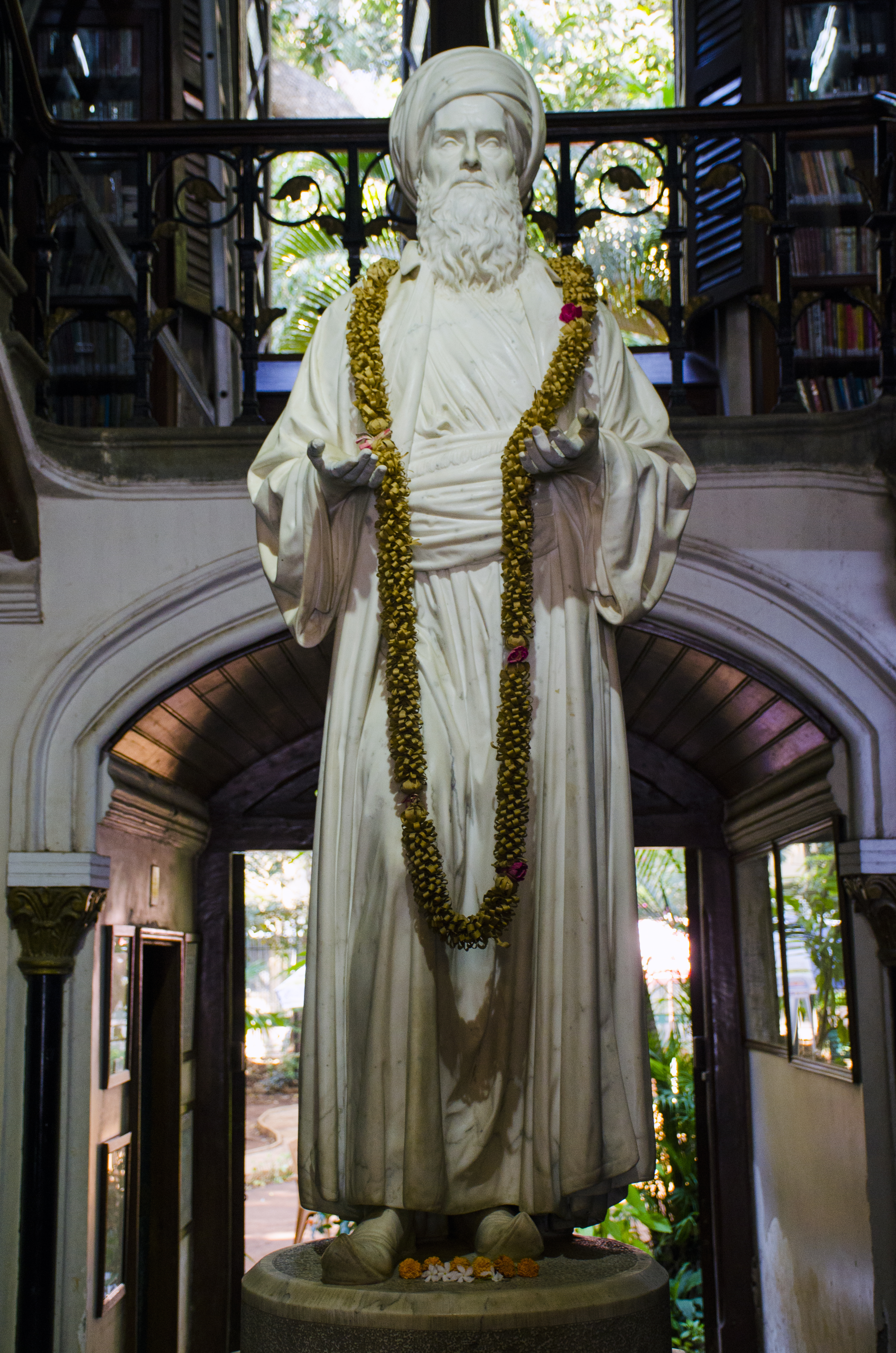
Statue of David Sassoon at David Sassoon Library, Mumbai

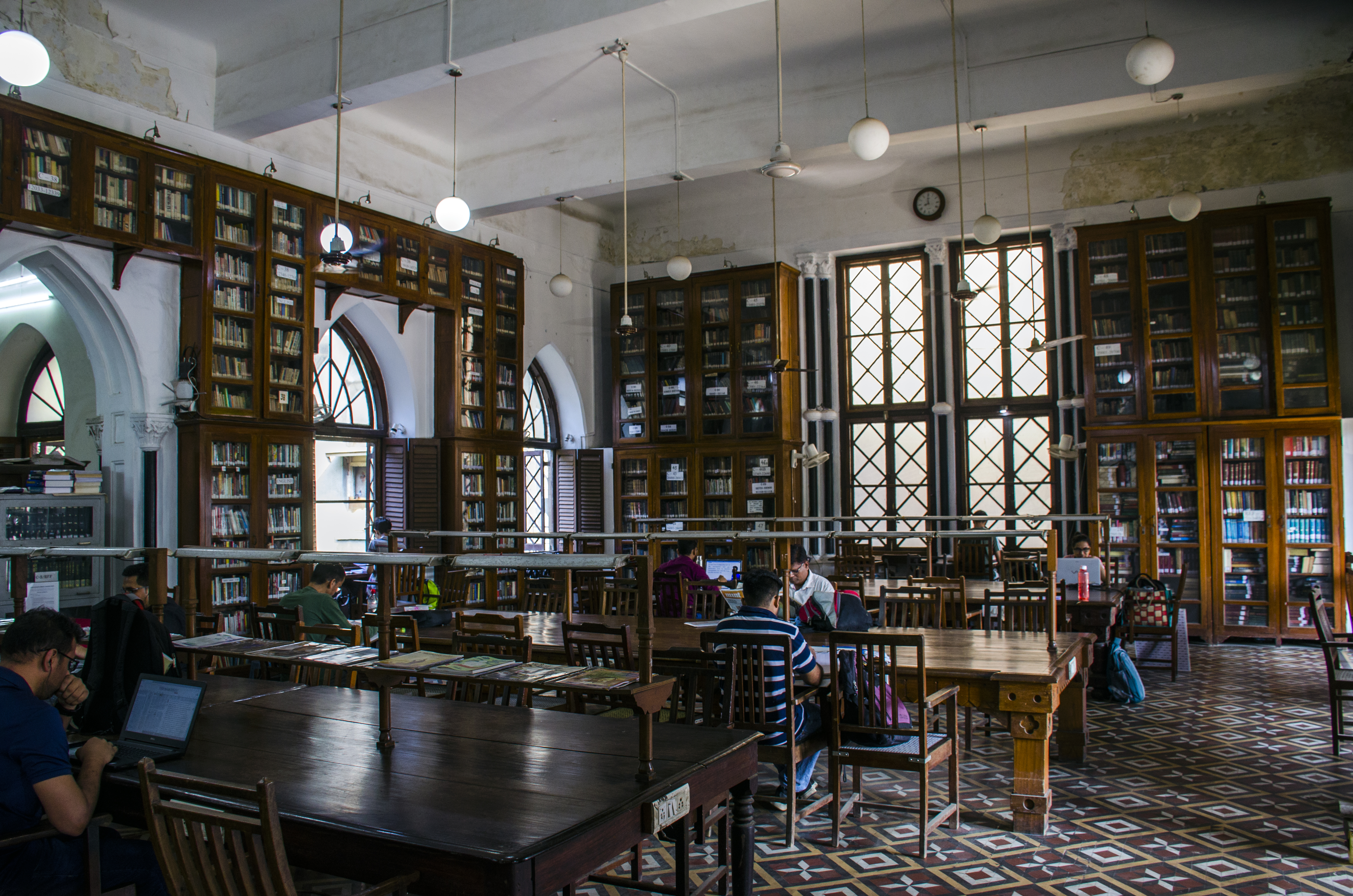
Interior of David Sassoon Library, Mumbai

Given the architectural importance of the building, Lambah's team extensively relied on archival research and documentation. Every new element introduced, such as the metal chandeliers, was carefully modeled after its 19th-century counterpart to seamlessly integrate with the building's style. Significantly, her team reinstated the original sloping roof, replacing a reinforced concrete slab that had been added insensitively after the 1960s. This flat slab had caused significant damage due to leakage, affecting both the structure itself and the books housed within it.

=== Post-restoration images ===
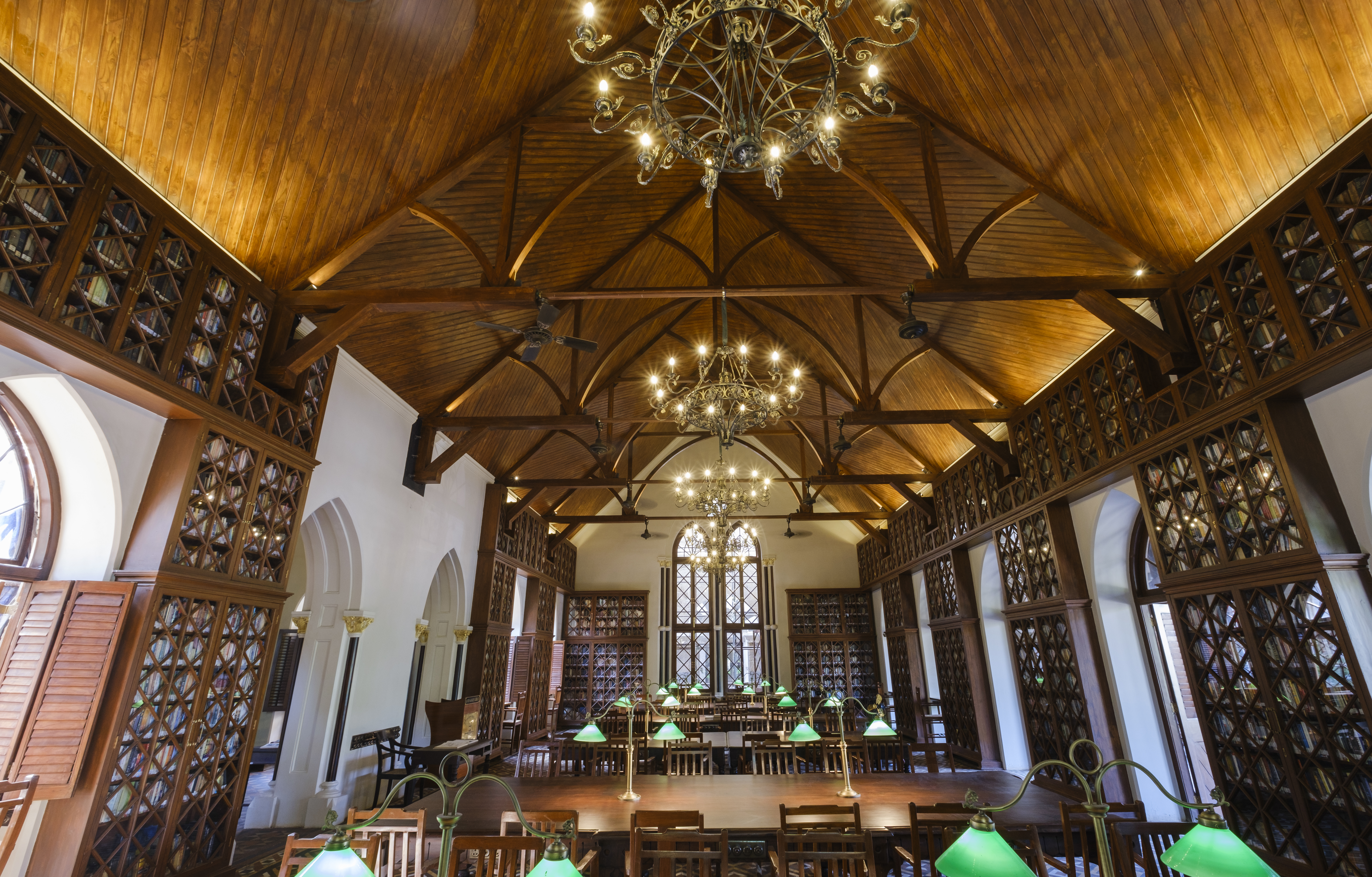
Interior of David Sassoon Library in May 2023

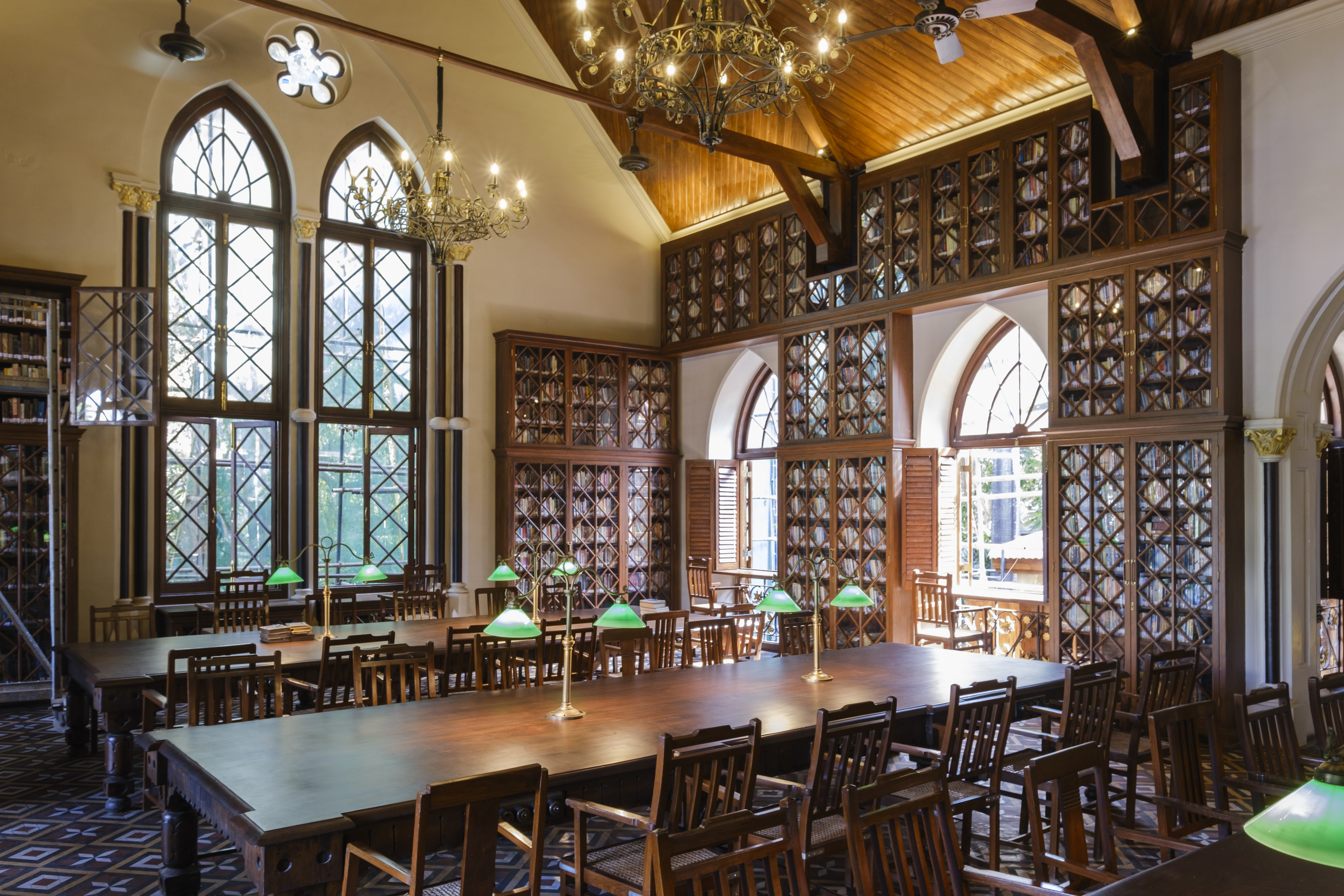
Interior of David Sassoon Library in May 2023

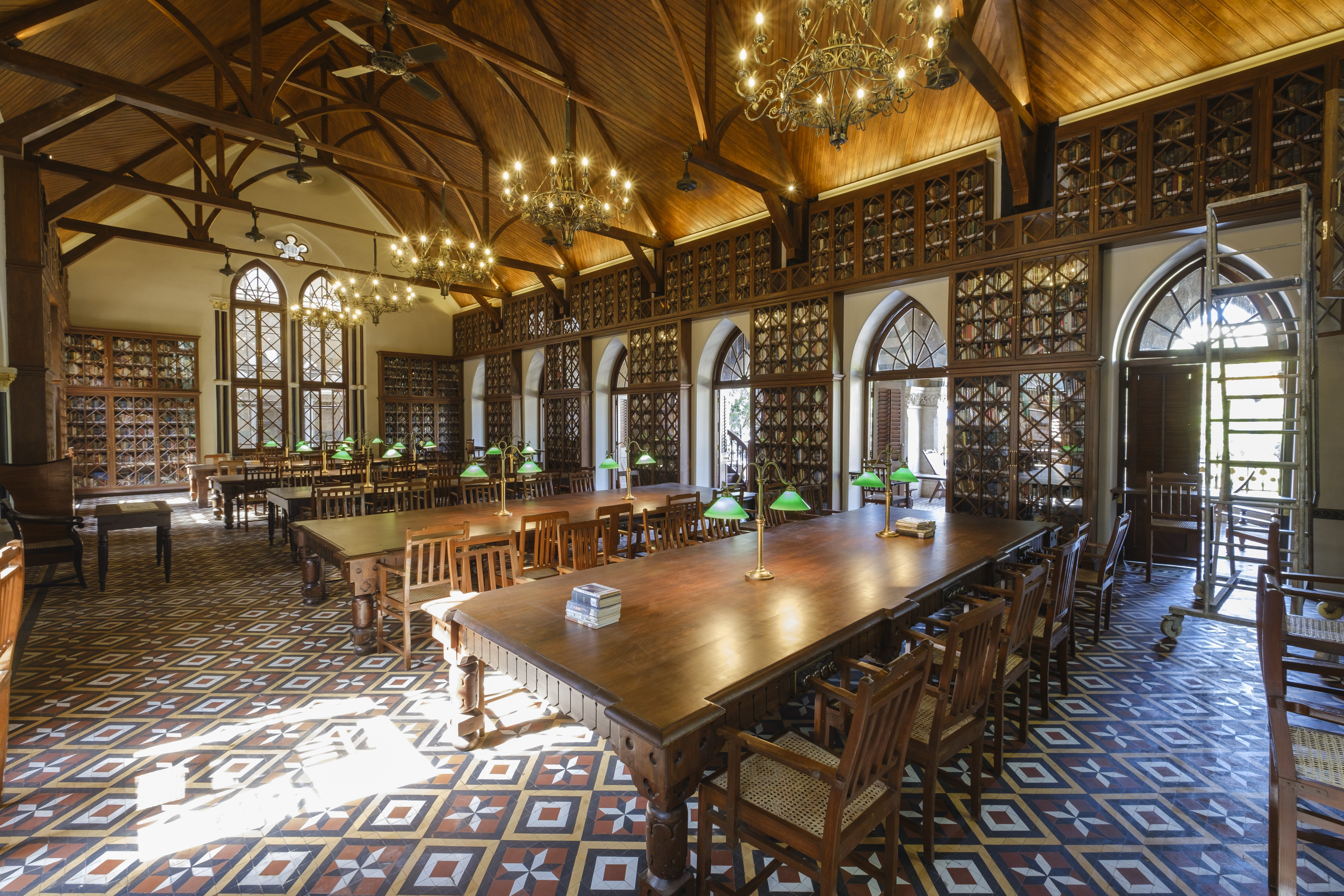
Interior of David Sassoon Library in May 2023

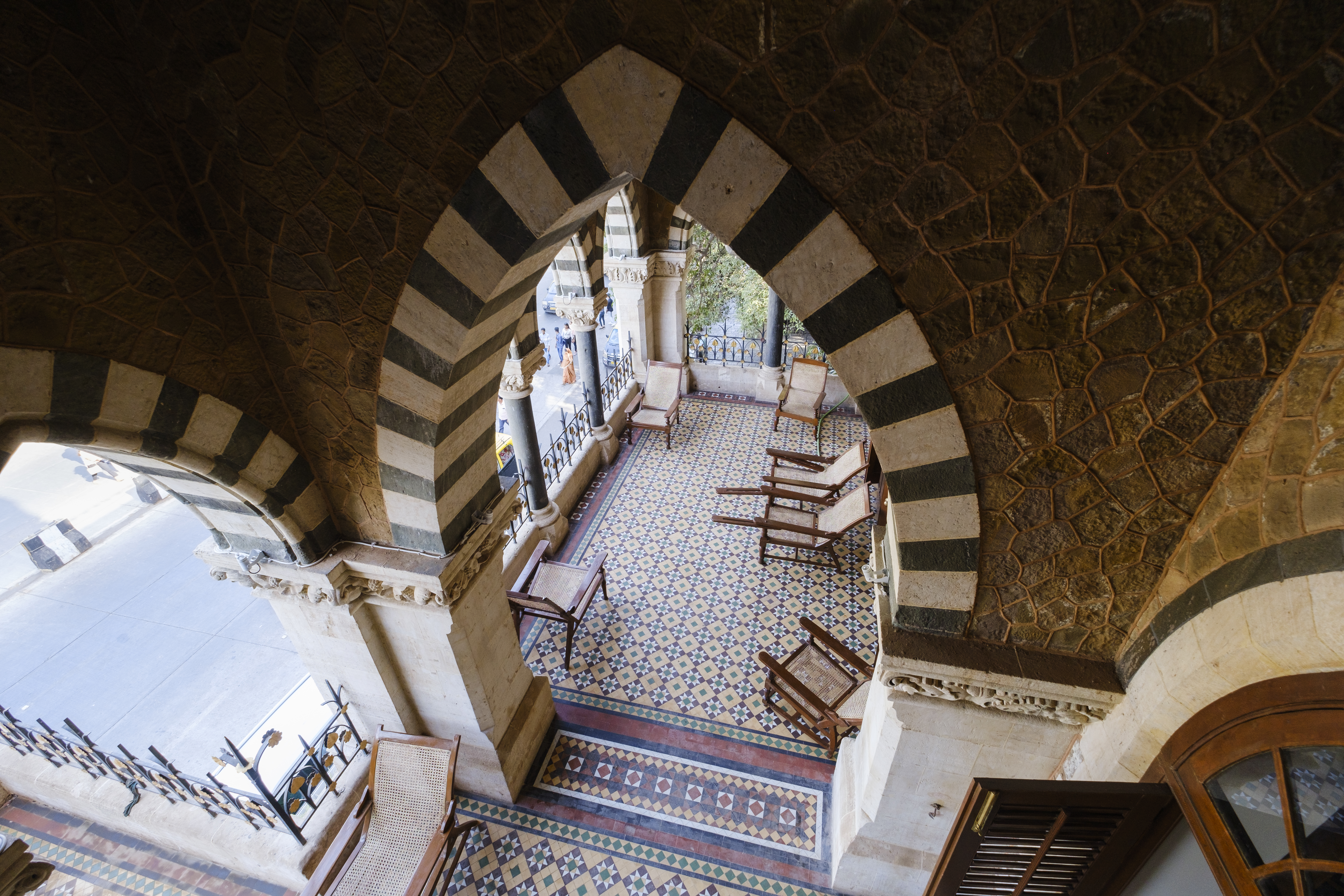
Entrance Arches of David Sassoon Library in May 2023

== See also ==
- Sassoon Docks
