= Magen David Synagogue (Byculla) =

Synagogue in Mumbai, India

- Hebrew: בית הכנסת מגן דוד; Malayalam: മാഗെൻ ഡേവിഡ് സിനഗോഗ്
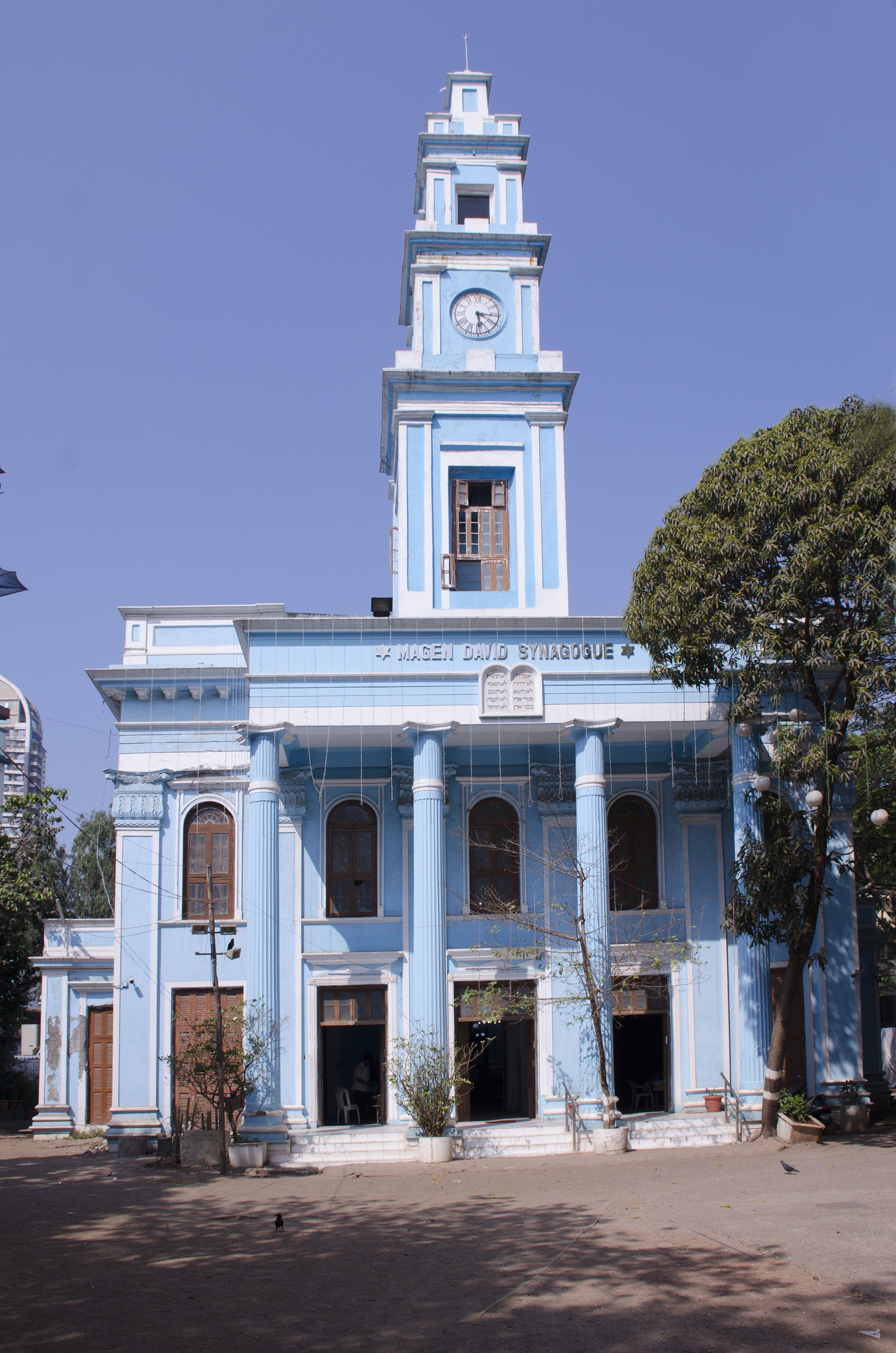
- The synagogue, in 2020

- Location of the synagogue in Mumbai

Religion
- Affiliation: Judaism
- Rite: Nusach Sefard
- Ecclesiastical or organisational status: Synagogue
- Status: Active

Location
- Location: 340, Sir J. J. Road Byculla, Mumbai
- Country: India
- Coordinates: 18°58′01″N 72°49′55″E

Architecture
- Type: Synagogue architecture
- Style: Victorian; Neoclassical
- Funded by: David Sassoon
- Completed: 1864

Specifications
- Direction of façade: West
- Capacity: Over 200
- Minaret: One (Clock tower)
- Materials: Concrete, steel, glass

The Magen David Synagogue (Hebrew: בית הכנסת מגן דוד, lit. 'Shield of David Synagogue'; Malayalam: മാഗെൻ ഡേവിഡ് സിനഗോഗ്) is a synagogue, located in Byculla, Mumbai, in the state of Maharashtra, India.

== History ==
The Victorian and Neoclassical-styled Sephardi synagogue was constructed in 1864 by David Sassoon for the growing population of Baghdadi Jews who had fled from persecution by the governor and Wali of Baghdad Dawud Pasha. By 1910, the Jewish community in the neighbourhood of Byculla had increased to the extent that the synagogue could no longer service all the devotees and the synagogue was extended with the help of Jacob, David Sassoon's grandson.

== Legacy ==
The synagogue is one of the largest in Asia outside of Israel.

Within the extensive grounds of the synagogue there are two Jewish schools that are both operated by the Sir Jacob Sassoon High School Trust and the E.E.E. Sassoon High School Trust, in which Jewish children were originally educated. Over time most of the Bagdadi Jews moved to the more affluent Colaba area or abroad to Israel, Australia, Britain and Canada. With the scarcity of Jewish students, the schools have opened to all communities and currently provide for the population in the vicinity, which is 98% Muslim.

The synagogue was restored for the celebration of the 150th anniversary in 2011.

== Gallery ==
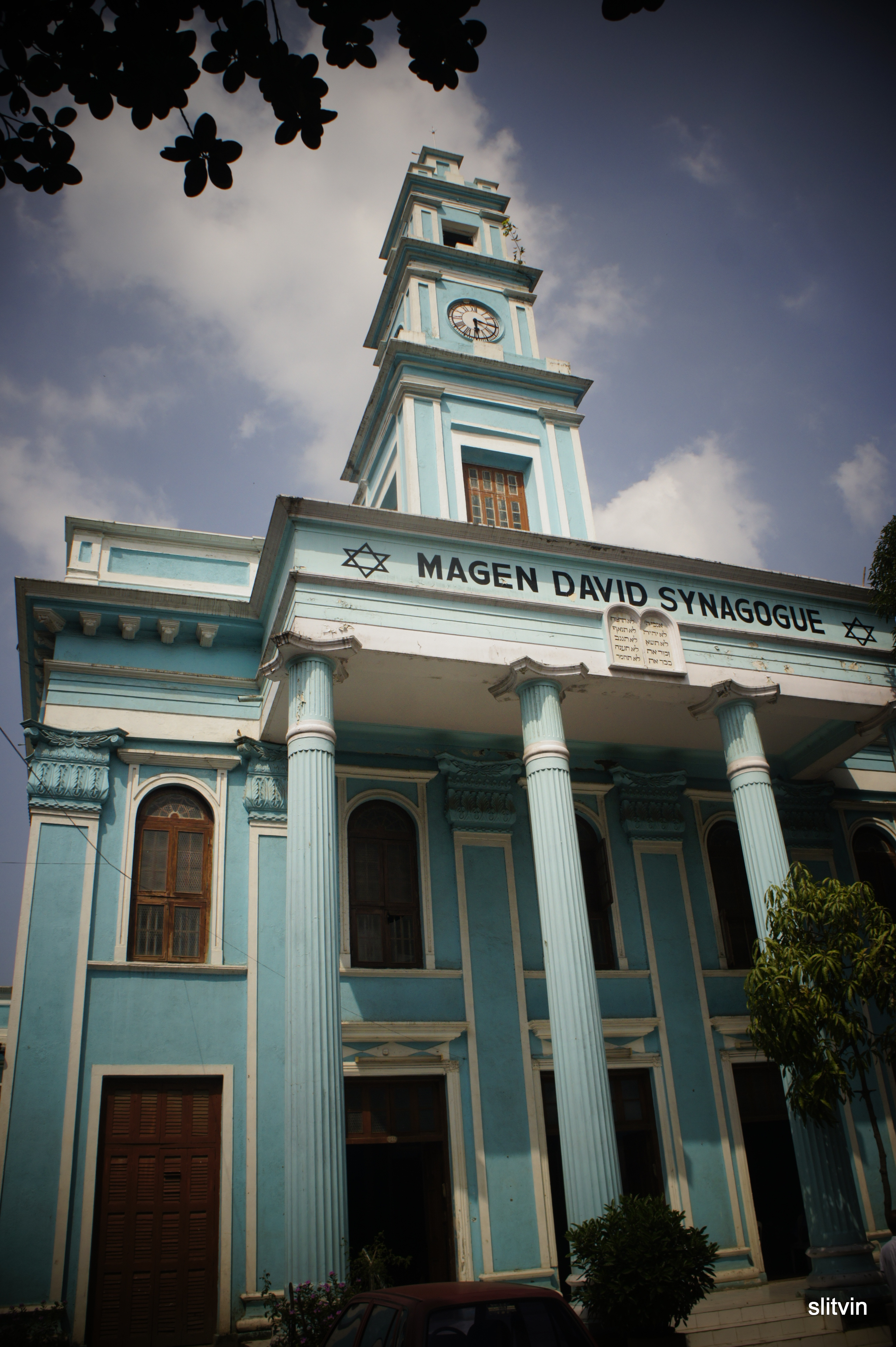
Exterior

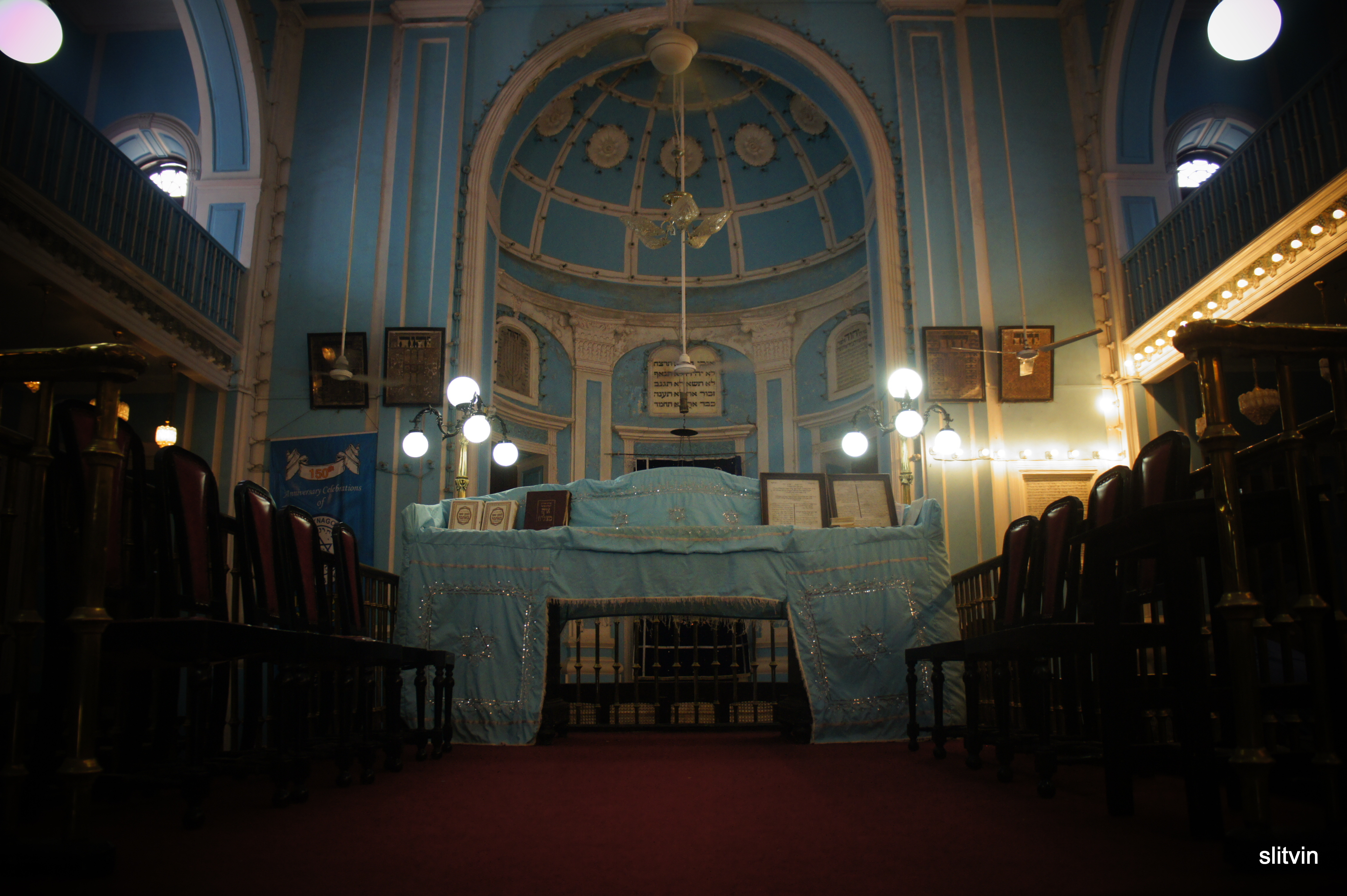
Ark

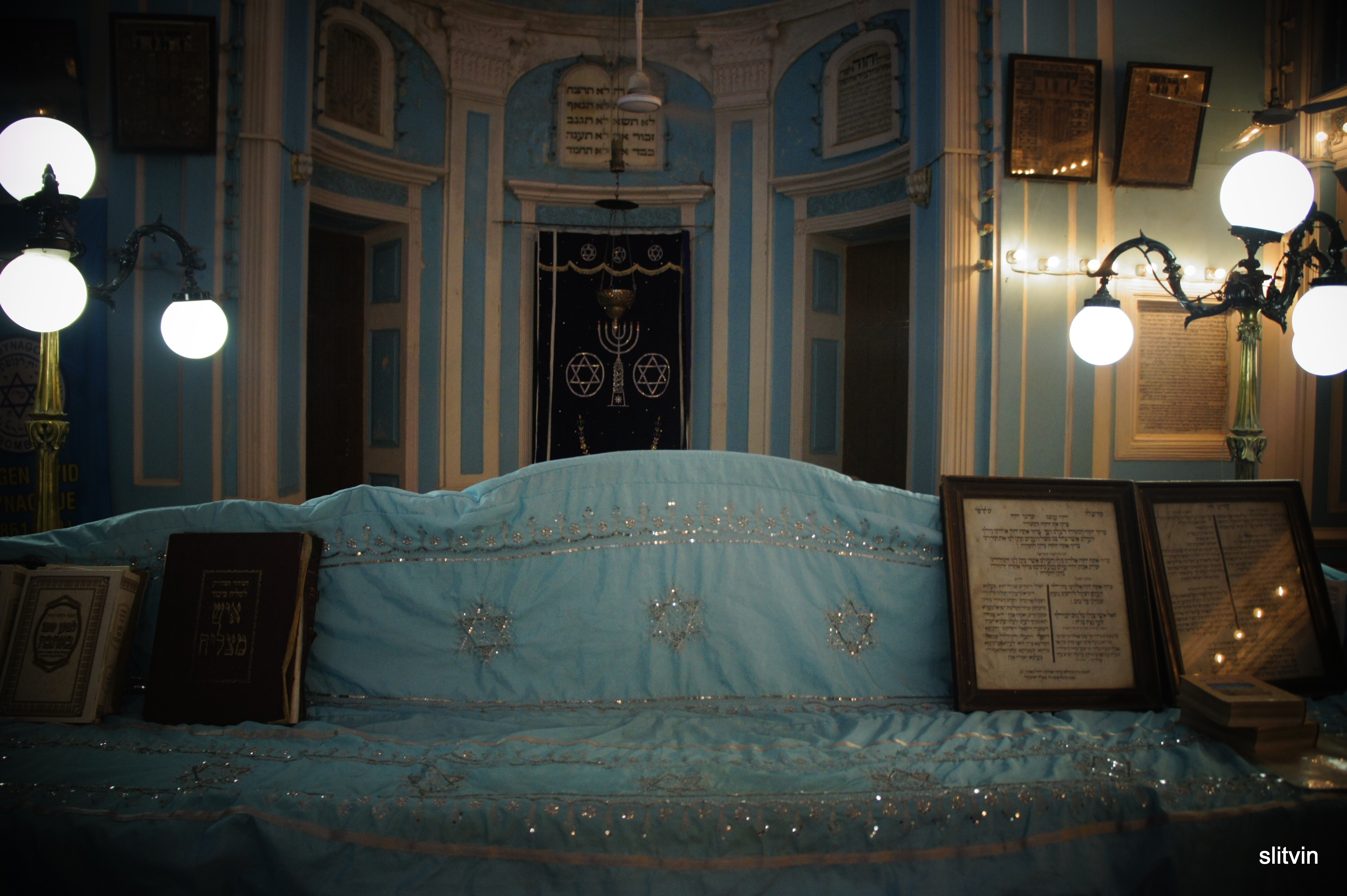
Interior

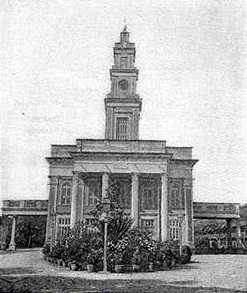
The synagogue, in c. 1900s

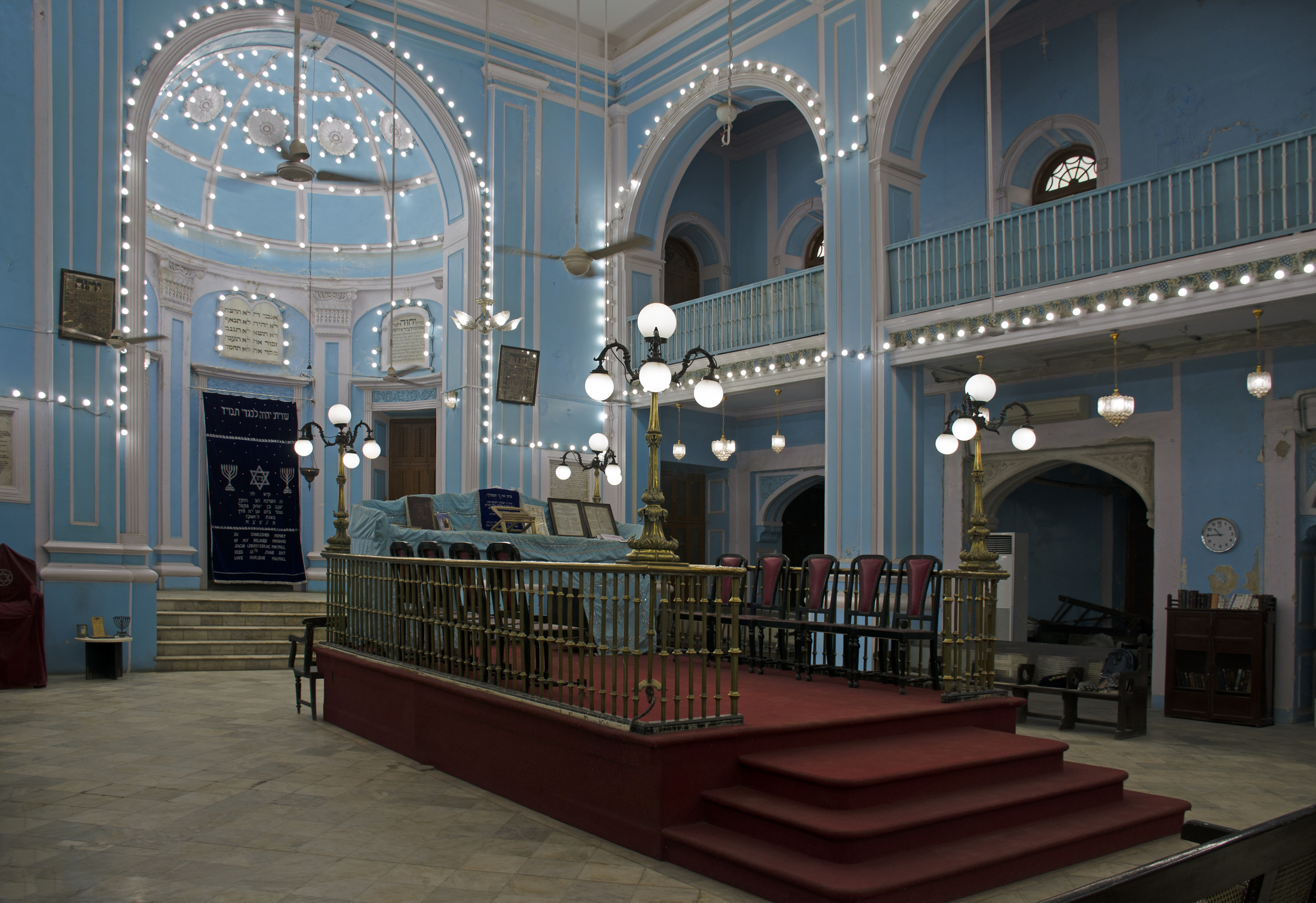
Interiors

== See also ==
- History of the Jews in India
- List of synagogues in India
