= David Sassoon (treasurer) =

Jewish merchant of Baghdad (1792–1864)

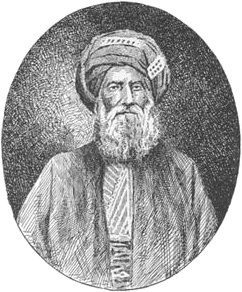
- David Sassoon
- Born: October 1792; Baghdad, Baghdad Eyalet, Ottoman Iraq
- Died: 7 November 1864 (aged 72); Poona, Bombay Presidency, British India
- Resting place: Ohel David Synagogue Complex, Pune
- Occupations: Merchant; philanthropist
- Spouses: Hannah Joseph (m. 1818; died 1826) Farha Hyeem (m. 1828)
- Children: 14, including Albert, Elias, Sassoon David, Rueben, Arthur, Solomon, and Fredrick
- Parent(s): Saleh Sassoon (father); Amam Gabbai (mother)
- Relatives: Sassoon family

David Sassoon (October 1792 – 7 November 1864) was a Baghdadi Jewish merchant and philanthropist in Ottoman Iraq. David Sassoon served as the treasurer of Baghdad between 1817 and 1829. Fleeing persecution, Sassoon and his family emigrated to Bombay, British India. He became the leader of the Jewish community in Mumbai after the Baghdadi Jews emigrated to the city. Sassoon was the founder of the Sassoon family and the founder of David Sassoon and Sons, which later became David Sassoon & Co., a trading company owned by his family. Sassoon's success as a merchant, in which opium played a key role, made him known as the "Merchant Prince of Bombay". Sassoon also used his wealth for various philanthropic and architectural projects.

== Early life and career ==
David Sassoon was born in 1792 in Baghdad, Ottoman Empire. His father, Sheikh Sassoon ben Saleh (1750–1830), was a wealthy businessman, who had also served as the chief treasurer to the pashas (the governors of Baghdad), and served as the president (Nasi) of the city's Jewish community. His father also held the honorific title of Sheikh. His mother was Amam Gabbai and Sassoon was one of seven children. Sassoon and his family have Iraqi Baghdadi Jewish origin. Sassoon had an education in the Hebrew language.

Between 1817 and 1829, Sassoon served as the treasurer of Baghdad. Sassoon and his father, Sassoon ben Saleh, were persecuted by Dawud Pasha of Baghdad, which prompted Sassoon and his family to move to Bushehr, Iran, and after his father's death in 1830, the family relocated to Bombay, British India.

== Career in Bombay ==
Sassoon and his family arrived in Bombay in 1832 and in the same year, he founded David Sassoon & Co., a trading company. Originally, Sassoon acted as a middleman between British textile firms and the Persian Gulf's commodity merchants. He would then invest his profits in valuable harbour properties in Bombay, gaining early access to the best commodities of the merchants using his harbour docks, and used the additional funds earned from his harbour properties to finance other foreign trader's Indian purchases before their return journeys.

He also learned Hindi and developed a working command of the language. His major competitors were Parsis, whose profits were built on their domination of the Sino-Indian opium trade since the 1820s. By the 1830s, Sassoon had become one of the wealthiest people in India.

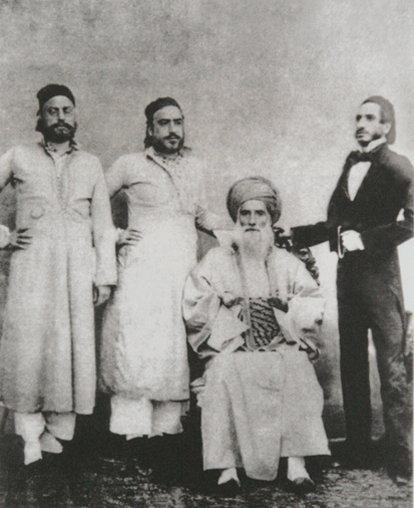
David Sassoon (seated) and his sons Elias David, Albert Abdallah and Sassoon David.

Sassoon began searching for opportunities in China during the 1840s. Following the 1842 Treaty of Nanking, which opened China to British traders in, Sassoon and his family began business operations in China in 1844. Sassoon sent his son Elias to Canton (now known as Guangzhou) to look for business opportunities in China, and Elias later set up business operations in Shanghai and in Hong Kong as well. In 1844, his son Elias, opened a David Sassoon & Co. branch office in Hong Kong. His company, David Sassoon & Co., opened an office in The Bund, in Shanghai's British concession, by 1845.

Sassoon, in his business, developed a lucrative triangular trade. In the triangular trade, Indian opium and cotton was brought to China, in return for which Sassoon received silver, tea and silk. Sassoon would then send these products to England. From Britain, finished products and cash were brought back to India and used to purchase more opium.

According to various historical accounts, by the 1860s, Sassoon had accumulated more wealth than the Parsis. Sassoon also capitalized on an opportunity that presented itself due to the American Civil War. Due to the American Civil War, American cotton exports to Lancashire's textile mills were interrupted. This led Sassoon to expand his textile business to include exports of cotton and cotton yarn. The factories in Lancashire replaced American cotton imports with Sassoon's Indian cotton and cotton yarn imports. Sassoon and his family's success made them among the wealthiest and most influential business families in Bombay. Sassoon's achievements earned him a reputation within the Jewish community in Asia as someone who would offer employment to any Jew in need. By the 1870s, Sassoon had come to dominate the opium trade to China, having outcompeted Jardine Matheson, a British company, and the Bombay-based Parsi traders, to the extent that they were pushed out of the business of opium trading to China.

== Personal life and family ==
Sassoon was married to Hannah Joseph and they had four children before she died in 1826. Sassoon later married Farha Hyeem and they had 10 children. Sassoon's sons were Albert, Elias, Sassoon David, Rueben, Arthur, Aaron, Solomon, and Fredrick, and his daughters were Mazaltob, Amam, Kate, Rebecca, and Mozelle. In Bombay, Sassoon continued to dress and have the manners of Baghdadi Jews; however, Sassoon's sons were allowed by him to adopt English manners. In 1853, Sassoon became a British subject, and signed his Oath of Allegiance to Queen Victoria in Hebrew due to his poor command of English; however, he was still based in Pune. Sassoon was a devout Orthodox Jew and observed religious practices, including the Sabbath. In Bombay, Sassoon first lived on 9 Tamarind Street and later with his family, moved to Byculla where he lived in Sans Souci, the former palace of Shin Sangoo. Sassoon's Sans Souci home was later donated to the Parsi Trust and later became the Masina Hospital.

His son Albert moved to London, England, in 1874, became a Baronet and married into the Rothschild family. Sassoon's eight sons all entered various areas of the Sassoon family’s businesses. Sassoon died on 7 November 1864. Albert was given control of David Sassoon & Co after Sassoon's death, which led to Elias separating from the family business due to a feud with Albert and founding E. D. Sassoon & Co., Elias' own trading company. Sassoon's grandson, David Solomon Sassoon, was a bibliophile. His other grandson, Edward Sassoon also served as a Member of the House of Commons.

== Philanthropy and legacy ==
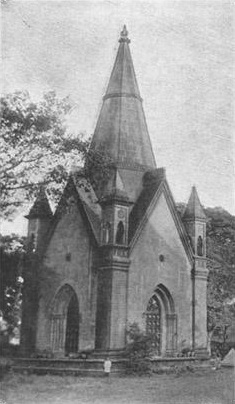
Tomb of David Sassoon, Ohel David Synagogue (Lal Deval), Pune, India

Sassoon Hospital, Pune in around 1875

Sassoon used his wealth to undertake various philanthropic initiatives and architectural projects. Sassoon built the Magen David synagogue in Byculla, Bombay, and he also built the Ohel David Synagogue in Pune. Sassoon also established a school, a Mechanics' Institute, a library and a convalescent home in Pune. He also donated for the construction of Victoria and Albert museum, which was later renamed as the Dr. Bhau Daji Lad Museum in Jijamata Udyann, a zoo and gardens. Through his wealth and philanthropic initiatives, Sassoon became the leader of the Jewish community of Bombay by the 1860s. He helped to arouse a sense of Jewish identity among the Bene Israeli and Cochin Jewish communities. Various charity trusts, which continue in existence today, were funded from his private income and named after him and other members of his family.

Sassoon's businesses and philanthropic institutions helped him develop a social, educational and commercial network for Jewish immigrants in Bombay. He established the David Sassoon Benevolent Institution to educate young Jewish men who had immigrated from areas that included Baghdad, Syria, Iran, and Afghanistan in various subjects such as Arabic, bookkeeping, and Hebrew. Sassoon would later employ these people in his businesses. Sassoon's philanthropic institutions, which included a hospital, synagogue, library, and cemetery, all funded and endowed by Sassoon, offered his workers a range of services that supported them throughout their lives, including retirement and burial services. This contributed to the functioning of his business operations and earned him the loyalty of his workers. The Sassoon Docks, completed in 1875 and owned by his son Albert, and the David Sassoon Library are named after him.

Some of the prominent buildings built by David Sassoon and the Sassoon family are:

- David Sassoon Library & reading room, Fort Mumbai
- Magen David Synagogue, Byculla, Mumbai
  - Jacob Sasooon High School, Byculla, Mumbai
  - E.E.E. Sassoon High School, Byculla, Mumbai
- David Sassoon Hospital, JJ Hospital Premises, Byculla, Mumbai
- Masina Hospital, Byculla, Mumbai
- Knesset Eliyahoo Synagogue, Colaba, Mumbai
- Sassoon Dock, Colaba, Mumbai
- The Bank of India, Fort (head office), Mumbai
- The David Sassoon Reformary and Deaf school, Matunga, Mumbai
- Ohel David Synagogue, Pune
- Sassoon Hospital, Pune
- Lady Rachel Sassoon Dispensary, Pune
- David Sassoon Elderly and Destitute Persons Home (1863), Pune (today's Nivara Old Age Home)
- Sassoon House

They have contributed to the construction of:

- Gateway of India
- Sassoon Building of Elphinstone Technical High School, Mumbai
- The Institute of Science, Mumbai
- Clock Tower at the Victoria Gardens
- The Victoria and Albert Museum
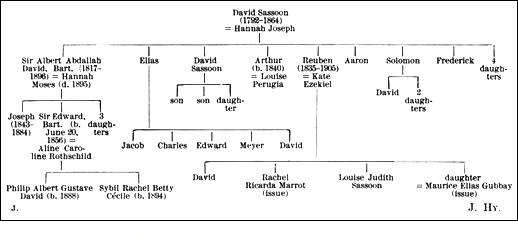
Family tree of the Sassoon family

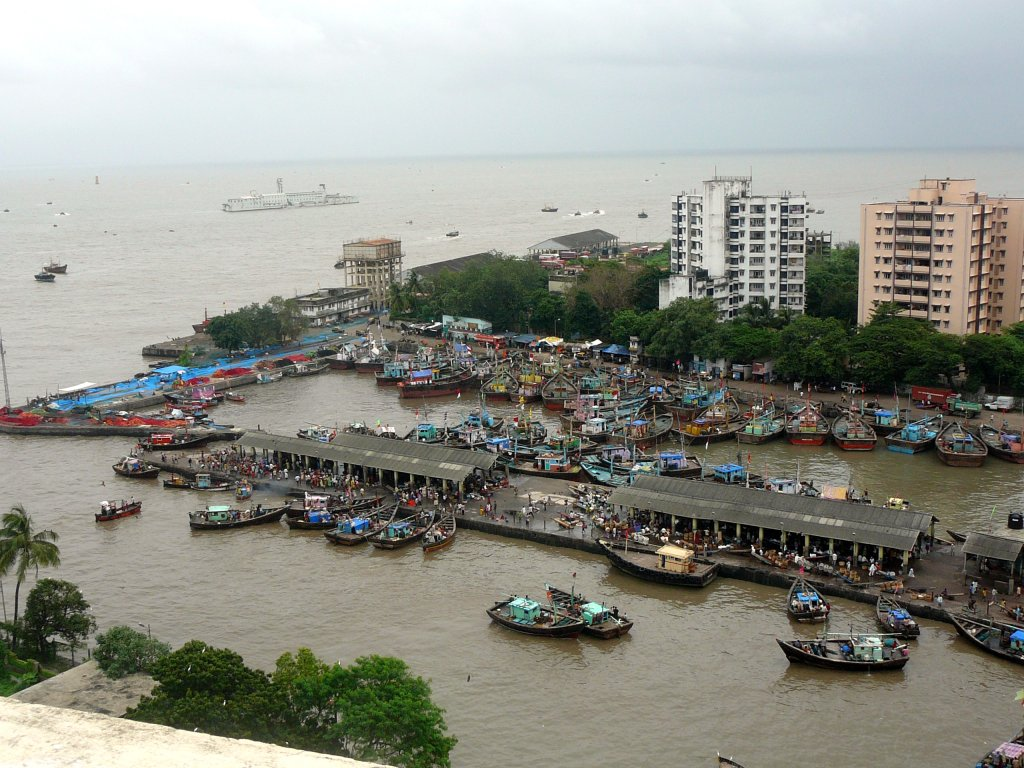
Sassoon Docks, in Mumbai

== See also ==
- Sassoon family
- David Sassoon & Co.
- E.D. Sassoon & Co.
- History of opium in China
