= Jewish cemetery, Kolkata =

Cemetery in Kolkata

Coordinates: 22°34′16″N 88°23′30″E

Jewish Cemetery, Kolkata
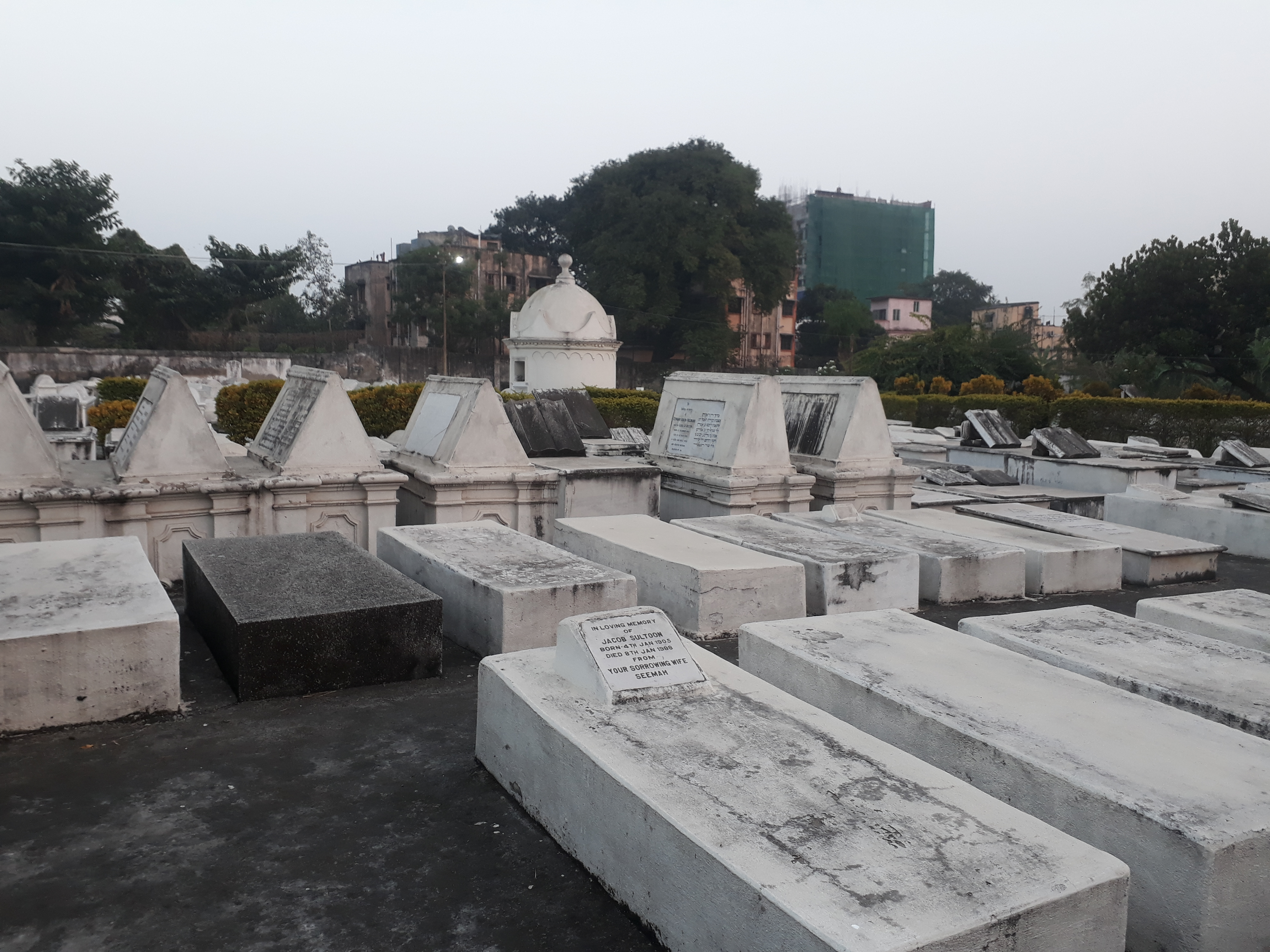
- Graves in Jewish Cemetery, Kolkata,

Details
- Established: 1812
- Location: Narkeldanga Main Road, Phoolbagan, Kolkata, West Bengal
- Country: India
- Type: Jewish cemetery
- No. of graves: Approximately 2,000

Jewish Cemetery, Kolkata is a heritage Jewish cemetery located beside Narkeldanga Main Road, Phoolbagan in Kolkata, in the Indian state of West Bengal. It is the largest Jewish cemetery in India.

== History ==
The cemetery was established in 1812 by the Baghdadi Jewish settlers in Kolkata. The founder of the Jews community in Kolkata, Shalom Obadiah Cohen, who arrived from Aleppo in 1798, acquired the land from a Bengali Muslim for burial ground. The earliest recorded burial is that of Moses de Pas, an emissary from Israel, who died in the then Calcutta in 1812. As the Jewish population expanded during the British colonial period the cemetery became the principal burial ground of the community. It contains 2000 graves approximately.

== Gallery ==
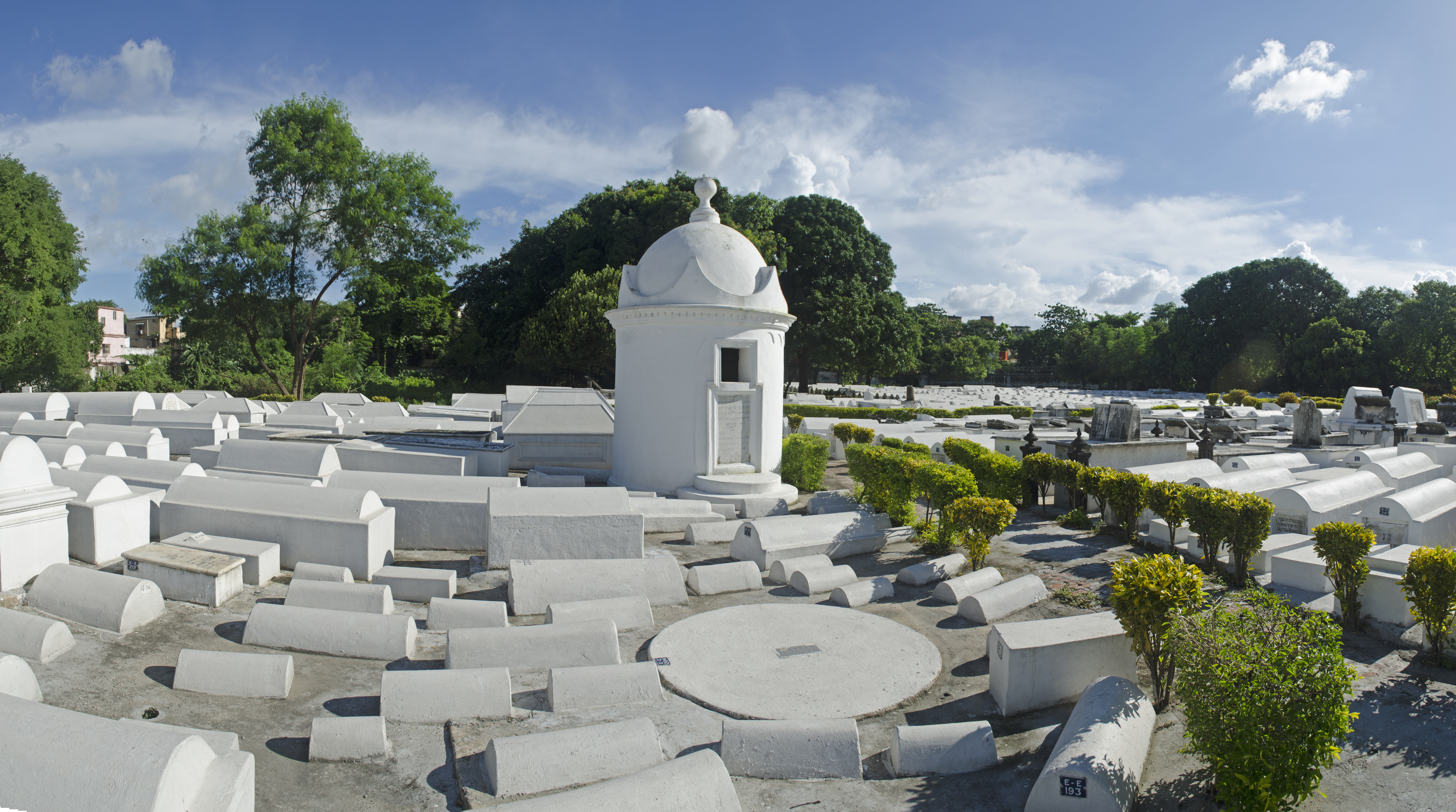

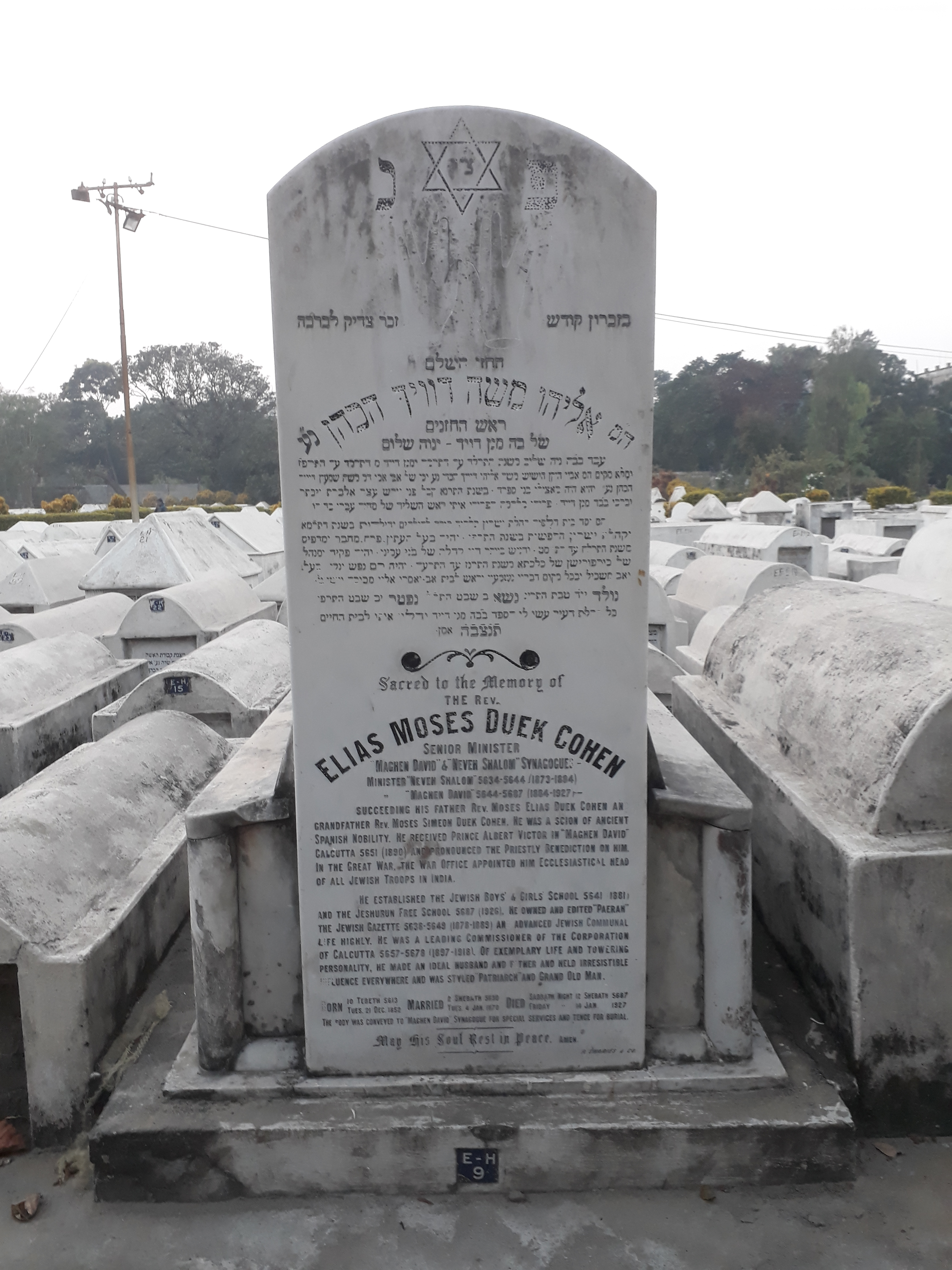

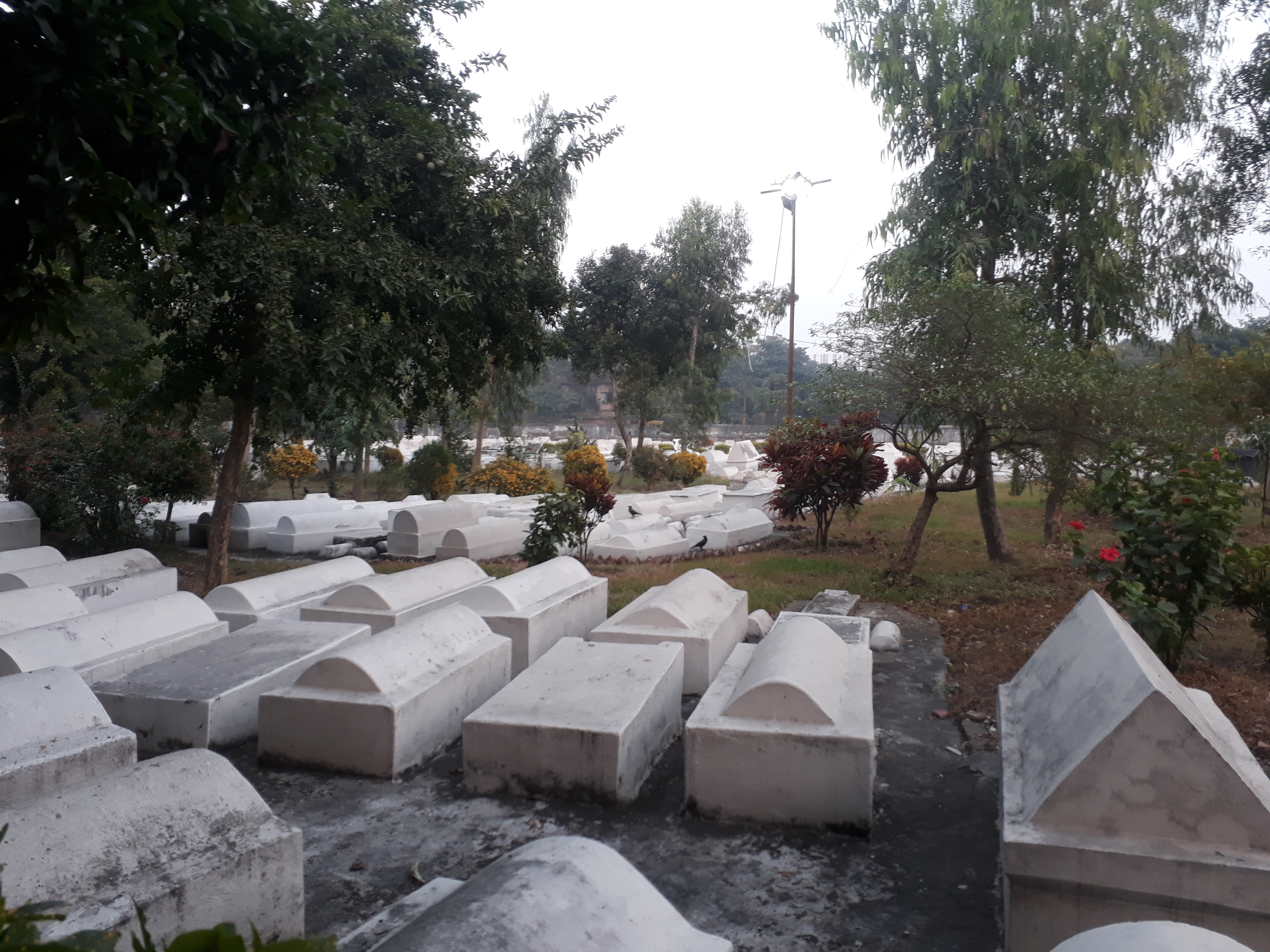

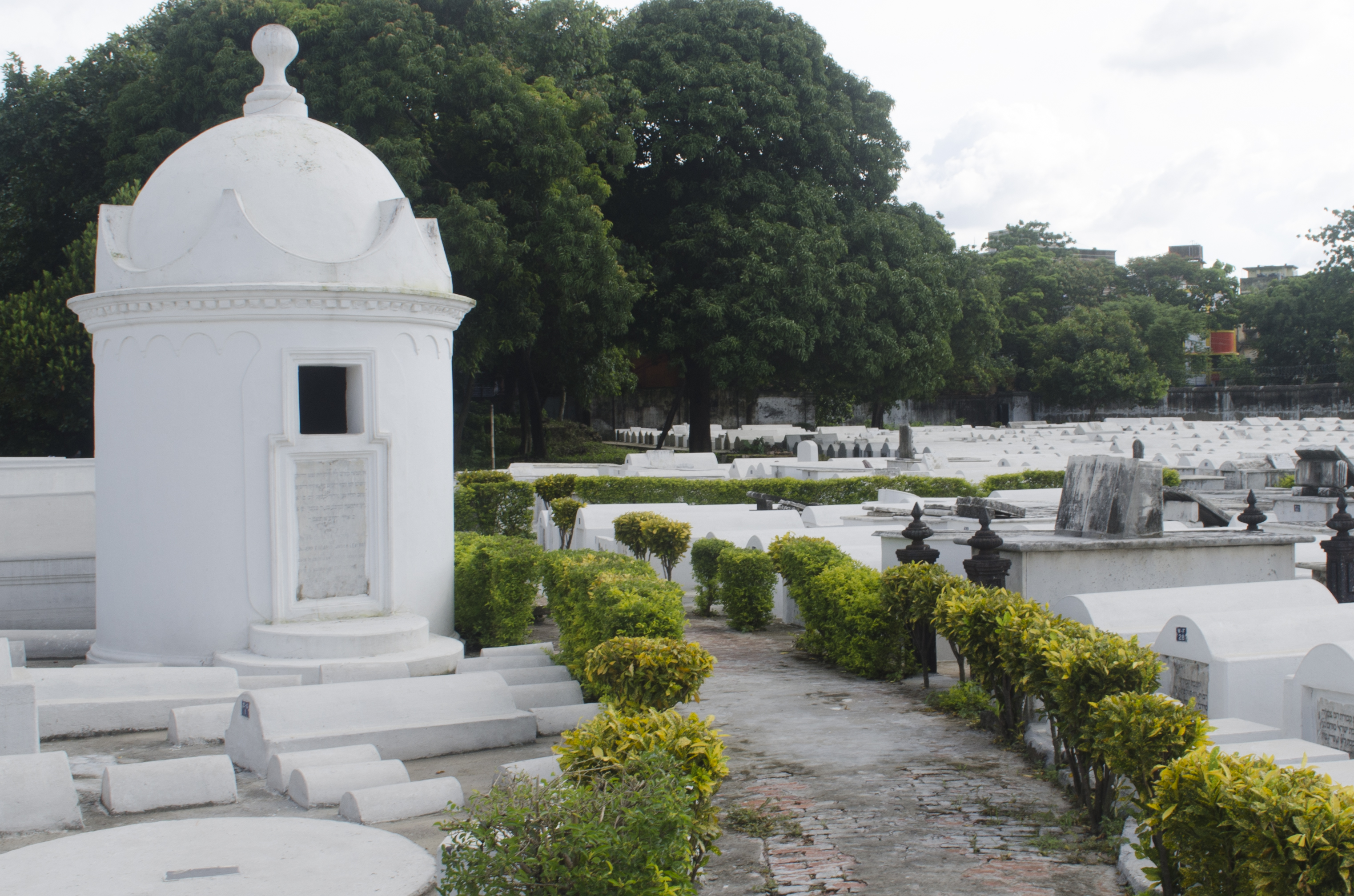

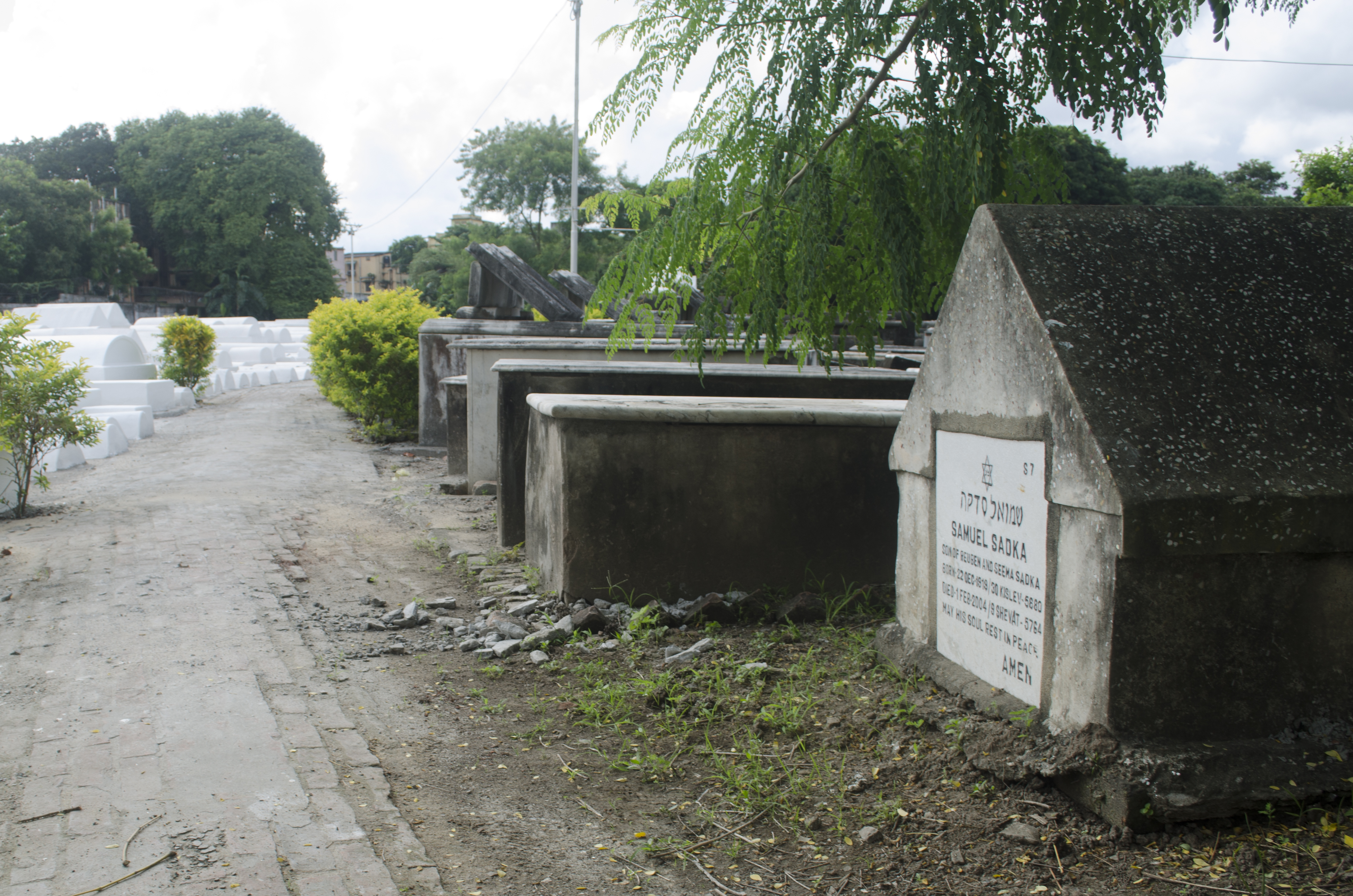

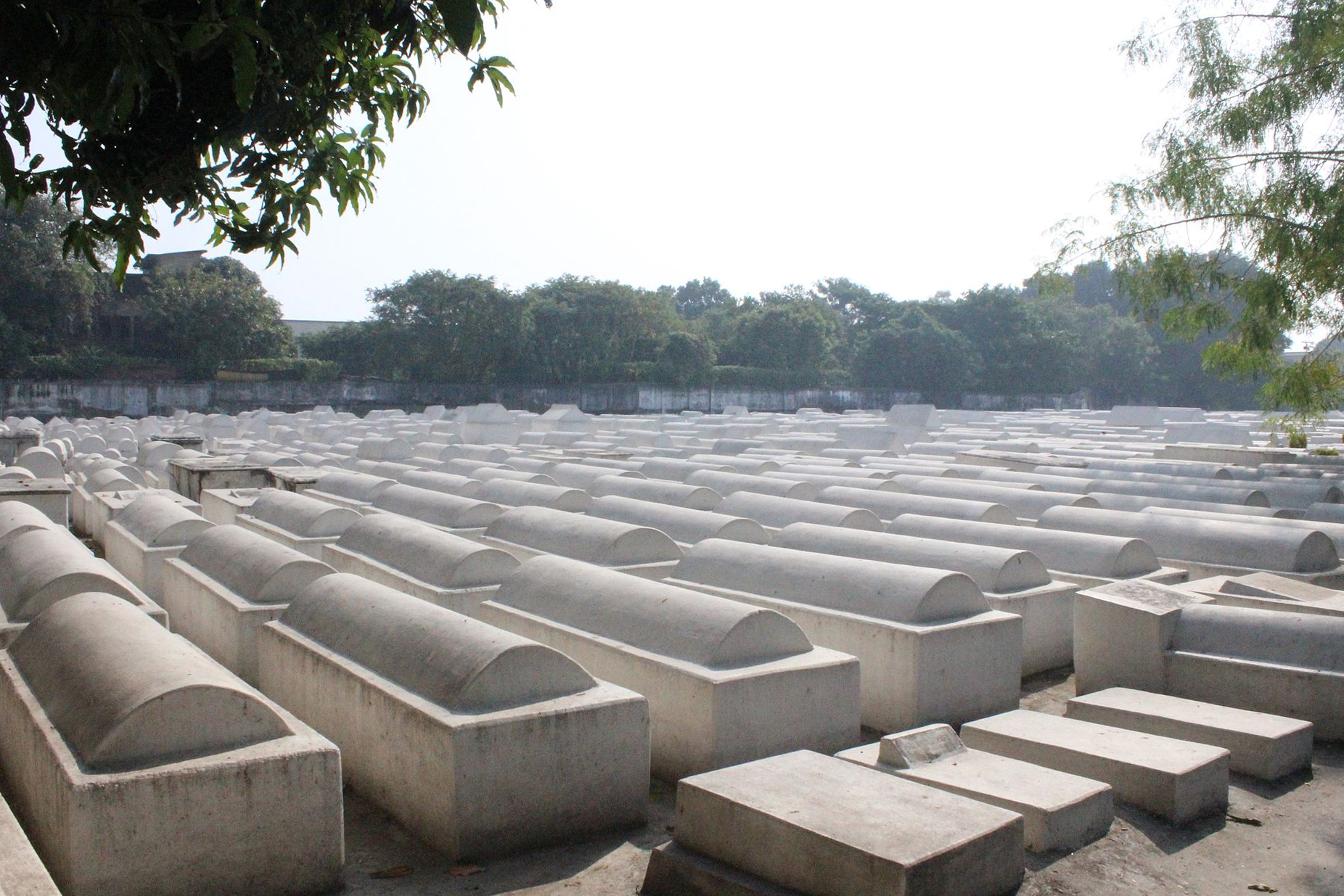
