= Esplanade Mansion =

The Esplanade Mansion may refer to:

- Esplanade Mansions, Kolkata
- Esplanade Mansion, Mumbai
