= David Joseph Ezra =

Indian merchant

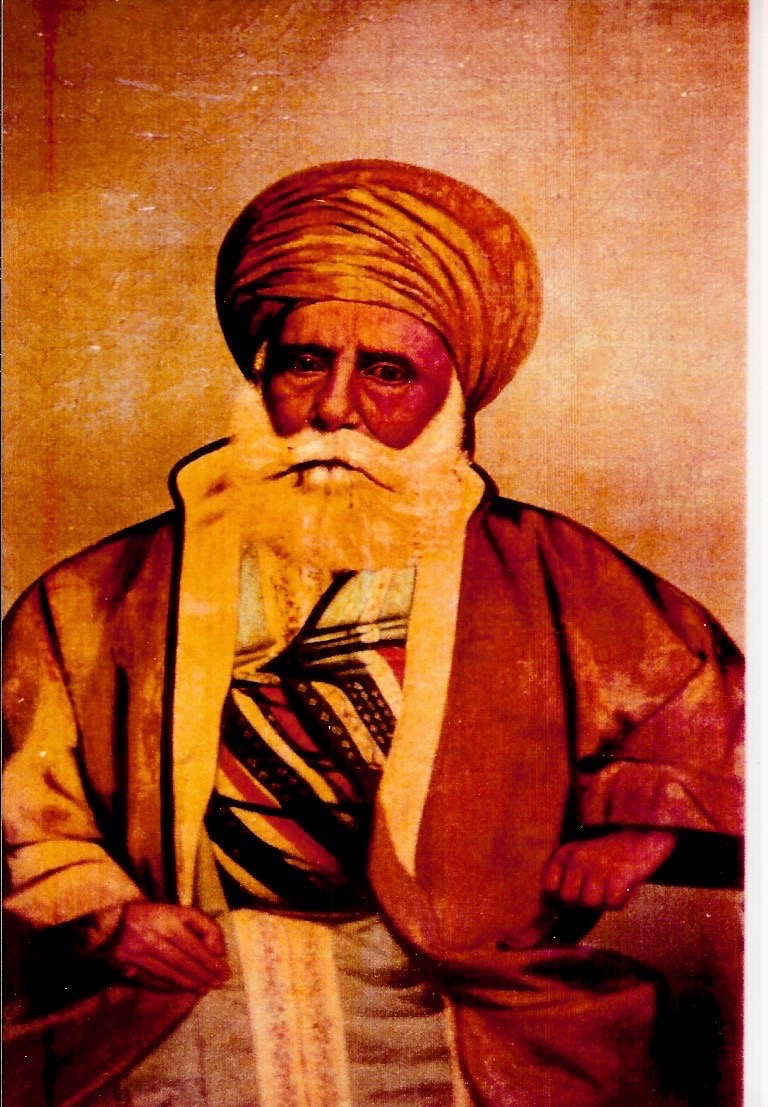
David Joseph Ezra.

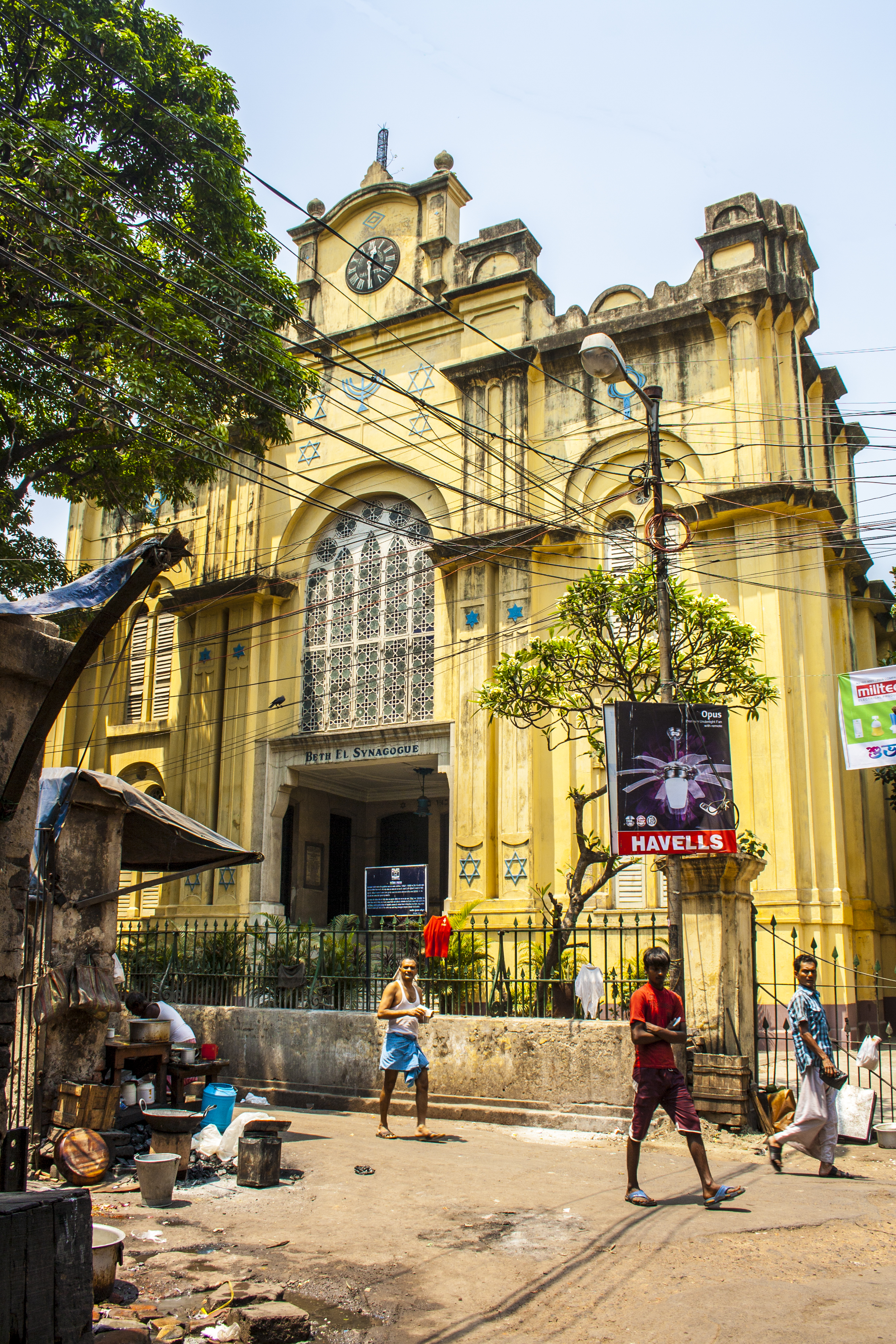
Beth El Synagogue, Calcutta

David Joseph Ezra (Hebrew: דוד יוסף עזרא, died 1882) was a leading merchant, property developer and communal leader of the Baghdadi Jewish community in Kolkata, India. He was one of the key developers behind nineteenth century Kolkata, and was responsible for many of its most celebrated Victorian buildings and synagogues.

== Origins and background ==
David Joseph Ezra was from a longstanding family of Jewish Indian Ocean and South China Sea traders.

The family hailed from the Jewish community in Baghdad, where they were also known as the Khalif or earlier Horesh family. The family claimed Sephardic descent and to have originated before the Inquisition from Spain and for one generation held the position of Treasurer of Baghdad and with it the leadership of the Jewish community in the city.

David Joseph Ezra's father Joseph Ezra, first arrived in Calcutta in 1821 having come via Bombay. Joseph Ezra, was also known as Joseph Ezra Khalif, or Joseph Ezra Baher, for sea in Arabic, as he was an ocean traveller. Historian Cecil Roth speculated the family were known as Baher as they were amongst the first Iraqi Jewish families to cross the Indian Ocean. Joseph Ezra brought with him his sons Nissim and David Joseph Ezra. Joseph Ezra was described by the Ashkenazi traveller Israel Joseph Benjamin as "one of the richest of our brethren" amongst the Baghdadi Jews settled in India. After sometime he returned to Baghdad where he died. His son Nissim departed to Singapore where he was one of the founders of the Baghdadi Jewish community there.

== Life in Kolkata ==
Unlike his father or brother, David Joseph Ezra chose to settle permanently in Kolkata and the uncanny foresight he chose to invest in property, in what then still an emerging trading centre and not yet the commercial hub of the British Empire in Asia, turned them into the wealthiest Jewish family in Kolkata in the late nineteenth to mid-twentieth century. His initial wealth grew principally from indigo, silk and opium trading with Hong Kong which he invested in property. David Joseph Ezra has been described as having had a “larger than life” presence in Jewish and business life in Calcutta. He was a relative of the wealthiest and most influential nineteenth century Baghdadi Jewish trader David Sassoon.

In addition to trading with British, Indian and Chinese clients, Ezra and his firm acted as an agent for Arab ships arriving in colonial Kolkata from Muscat and Zanzibar loaded with dates and other products in exchange for rice, sugar and other food items. He thrived in Kolkata and he became the city's largest property owner and spent vast sums on communal institutions for the rapidly growing Baghdadi Jewish community of which he was a leader. Ezra's buildings included Esplanade Mansions, Ezra Mansions and Chowringhee Mansions and Ezra Terrace whilst Ezra Street was also named after him. With his fellow Baghdadi Jewish community leader Ezekiel Judah he built the Beth El synagogue in 1856 on Pollock Street. Both families subsequently intermarried.

== Legacy ==
After his death in 1883, his family continued to hold leadership positions in the Baghdadi Jewish community. They were soon no longer known as the Baher but only as Ezra family. David Joseph Ezra's eldest son was Elias David Ezra, who built the Magen David Synagogue in 1884 in honour of his father. Elias David Ezra would serve as Sheriff of Calcutta was described in an inscription on the synagogue as "the father of the Jewish community." His son was Sir David Ezra who served both in the role of Sheriff of Calcutta and a director of the Reserve Bank of India.

== See also ==
- History of the Jews in Kolkata
