= David Elias Ezra =

Indian banker of Baghdadi Jewish origin (1871-1947)

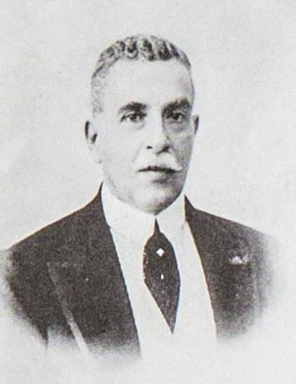
Sir David Elias Ezra

Sir David Elias Ezra (1871-1947) (or simply Sir David Ezra) was a prominent member of the Baghdadi Jewish community in Calcutta, India. Ezra was a property owner and a director of the Reserve Bank of India.

== Early life and family ==
David Elias Ezra was born in 1871, the son of Elias David Ezra and the grandson of David Joseph Ezra. He married Rachel Sassoon, daughter of Solomon David Sassoon. Ezra owned various properties in Calcutta, including the Esplanade Mansions.

== Positions and honors ==
Ezra was Sheriff of Calcutta and a director of the Reserve Bank of India. He was president of the Jewish Relief Association and of The Asiatic Society. Ezra was knighted by King George V in the 1927 Birthday Honours.

== Death ==
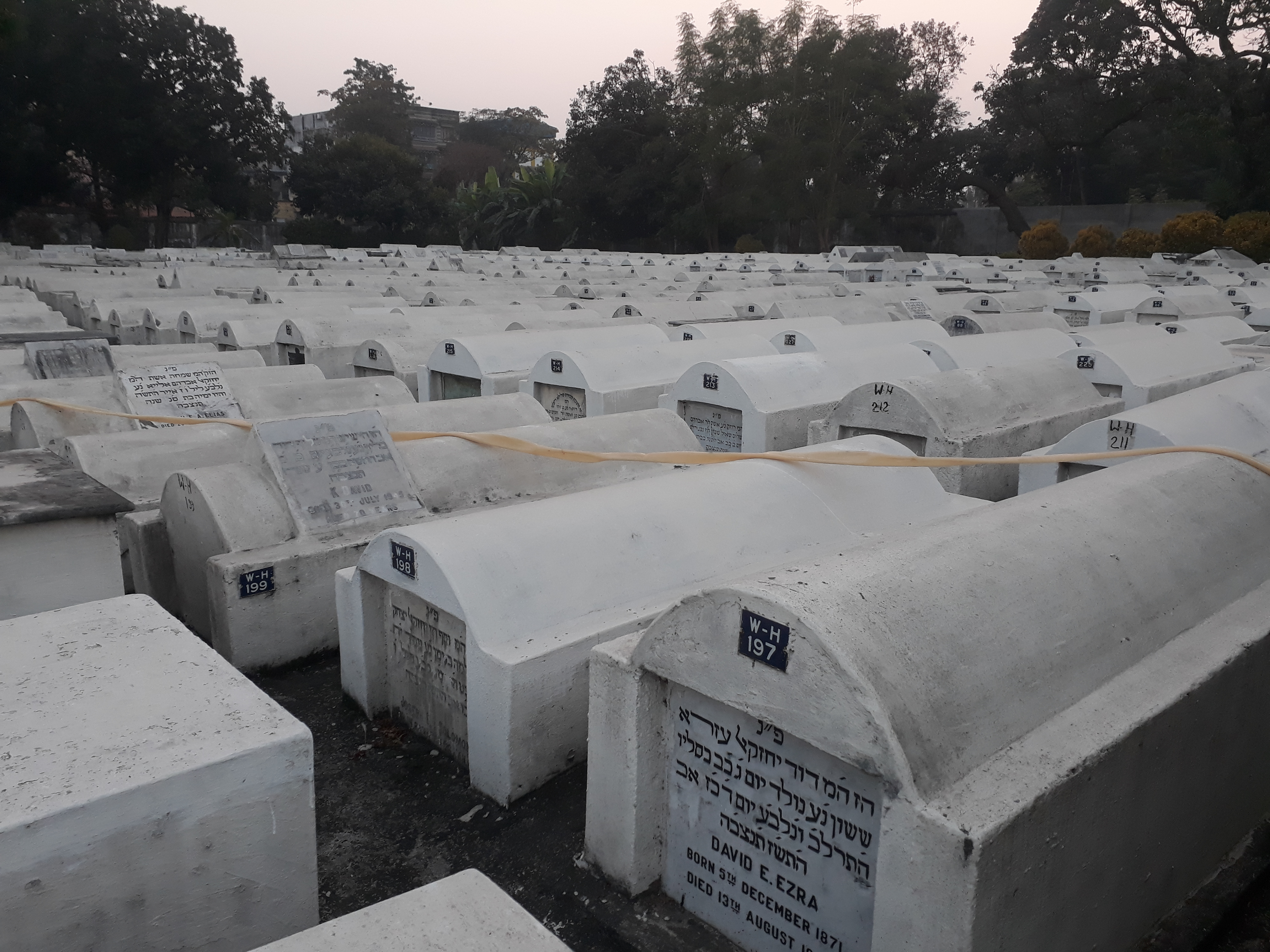
Grave in Kolkata

Ezra died in 1947.

== See also ==
- History of the Jews in Kolkata
