= David Jacob Cohen =

Indian politician

David Jacob Cohen OBE (died 9 February 1959) was an Indian politician and a leading figure of the Baghdadi Jewish community in Calcutta. He served as honorary secretary of the Beth-El Synagogue. Cohen, then serving as vice president of the Calcutta Jewish Association, was to the Bengal Legislative Council from the Calcutta South Central non-Mohammedan constituency in 1921. Being elected to the Legislative Council was the highest political office obtained by a Calcutta Jew. He was defeated in the 1923 election, but was nominated by the Governor to remain in the Council in 1923 and 1926.

Cohen was appointed an Officer of the Order of the British Empire in 1941.

Cohen died on 9 February 1959 at the age of 75.
