= Elias David Ezra =

Property owner in Calcutta, India

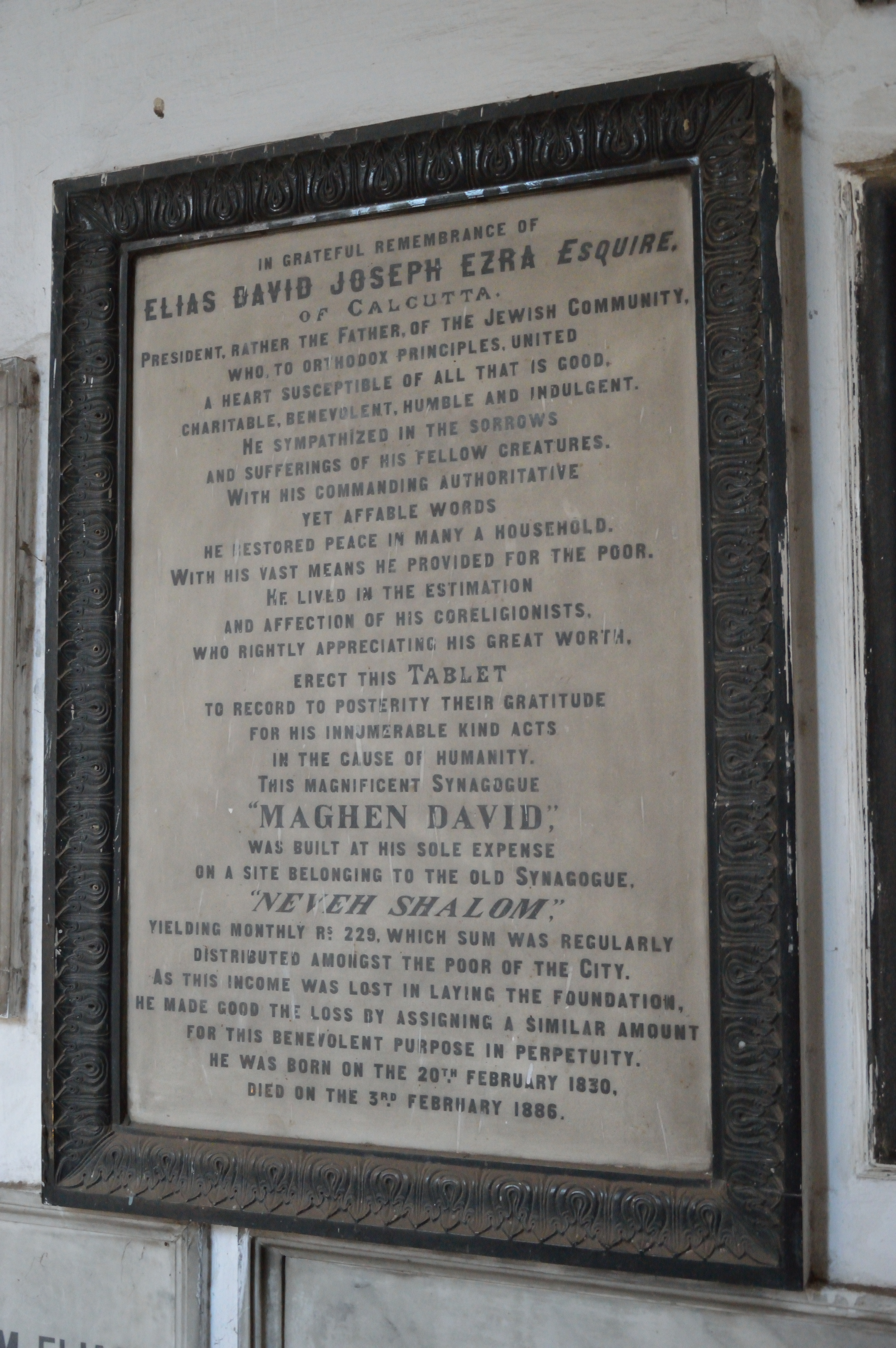
David Joseph Ezra memorial, Magen David Synagogue, Kolkata.

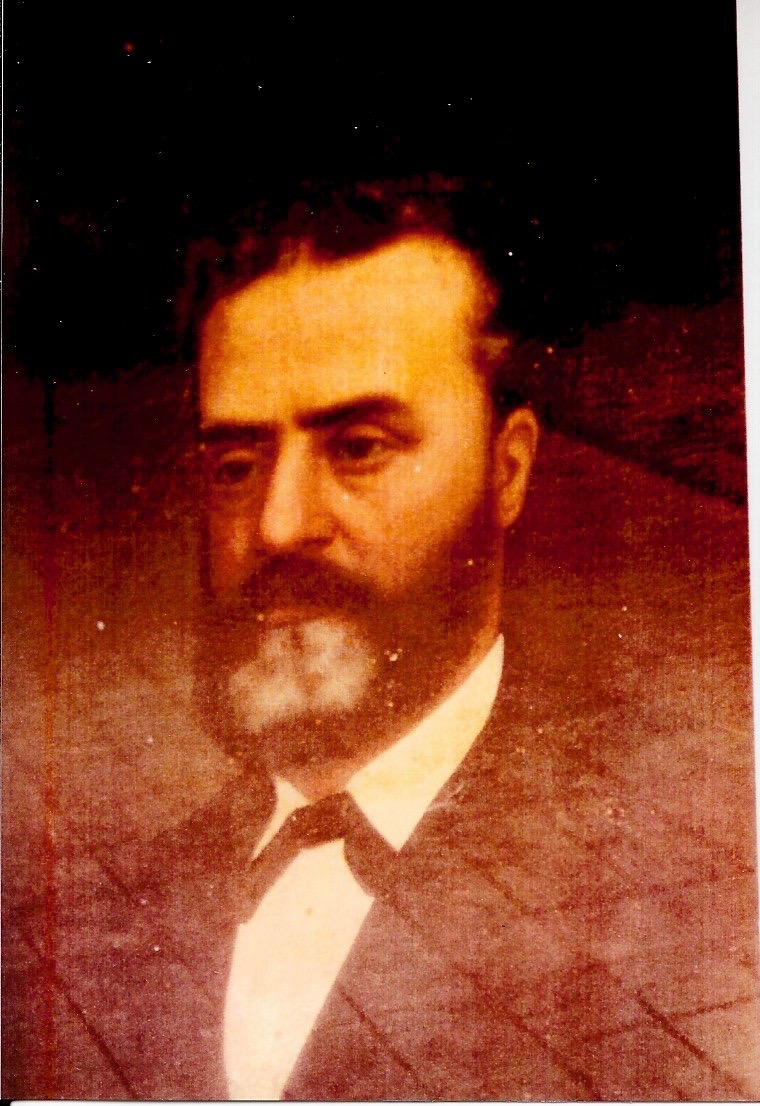
Elias David Joseph Ezra.

Elias David Joseph Ezra (20 February 1830 - 3 February 1886) was a property owner in Calcutta, India. He was a member of the Baghdadi Jewish community of the city.

Elias was the eldest son of merchant David Joseph Ezra who died in 1882. Elias built the Magen David Synagogue in 1884 in honour of his father.

He married Mozelle Sassoon (1853–1922), daughter of Sir David Sassoon of Bombay. His sons were Sir David Ezra and Alfred Ezra. A street in Kolkata is named after Ezra.

== See also ==
- History of the Jews in Kolkata
