= Shalom Obadiah Cohen =

Founder of Jewish community in Calcutta

Shalom Aaron Obadiah Cohen
- Born: 1762; Aleppo
- Died: 13 February 1836 (aged 73–74); Kolkata
- Other name: Shalom ben Aharon ben Obadiah ha-Cohen
- Occupation: Jeweler
- Children: 10

Shalom Aaron Obadiah Cohen (1762–1836) was a Jewish jeweler, merchant, and community leader known for founding the Jewish community in Kolkata.

== Life and career ==
=== Early life ===
Shalom Aaron Obadiah Cohen was born in Aleppo in 1762 to Aaron Obadiah Cohen and Chana Dayan. Much of what is known about his early life originates from his diary, spanning from 1789 to 1834. The manuscript was written in Judeo-Arabic.

=== First journey to India ===
Cohen traveled to India in 1789 via Baghdad, Hillah, and Basra. From Basra, at the time an important port for merchants, he embarked on a six-week voyage on a British ship heading to Mumbai. He first arrived in Surat for a five-month stay between September 1790 and April 1791. While some scholars have speculated that he left due to the increasingly perilous position of Jews in Aleppo and Baghdad, the main reason for his journey was likely to gauge the potential for growing his business in India.

=== Surat ===
Cohen returned to India on a more permanent basis in April 1792, bringing a cook and servant and buying a house from an Armenian merchant. However, when he sent for his wife Seti Duek Cohen and daughter Rebecca to join him in India, his father-in-law responded that they would not be coming "even if the entire distance from Aleppo to Surat were paved in jewels."

In Surat, he organized a petition for lower taxes from the British, which was signed by 65 Jewish merchants in 1795. His trade consisted mainly of diamonds, indigo, Dacca cloth, and silk. At one point he had a conflict with Samuel Guise-Moores, who was then acting as his private physician. In a letter to John Griffin, the head of the East India Company in Surat, Cohen demanded that he reprimand Guise-Moores.

While waiting for his wife and daughter to join him, Cohen married the daughter of his business partner, Jacob ben Semah Nissim, Najima. Cohen had nine children with Najima. Apart from a handful of business trips to Baghdad and Basra, Cohen lived in Surat through the end of 1797, when he left for Kolkata via Mumbai, Cochin, Madras, and Hooghly.

=== Kolkata ===
Cohen arrived in Kolkata on 5 August 1798. Soon after he settled there, he was joined by other Jewish merchants from Aleppo and Baghdad, including his brother Abraham. Though he is often recognized as the first Jew in Kolkata, this claim is refuted by records of other Jewish merchants living in Kolkata for shorter periods before his arrival. The first Jew to reside in the city was likely Lyon Prager, a Jewish merchant from London, who came to Kolkata in 1786 to work for Israel Levin Solomons. Cohen was, however, the founder of the community, and the first to establish a Baghdadi Jewish trading firm in Kolkata.

By 1806, as evidenced by a letter to Thomas Brown, then acting Chief Secretary of the British Government in India, Cohen requested British protection as he closed his businesses in Aleppo, Baghdad, Bushehr, and Basra. Cohen decided to settle in India instead of returning to the Middle East.

In May 1811, he purchased a home in Kolkata, which also served as the prayer hall for the growing local Jewish community, that still lacked a synagogue. A feud with his business partner and father-in-law Jacob Semah in 1812 led to Semah's imprisonment. Around the same time as the feud, Cohen moved his family to Chinsura, a day's journey from Kolkata. He maintained his property in Kolkata as a place of worship for the Jewish community. Semah returned to Baghdad, where he financed synagogues and Jewish schools.

=== Court jeweller in Lucknow ===
Having become particularly well known as an expert in the jewelry trade, he moved to Lucknow as the court jeweler for the Nawab Wazir Ghazi ad-Din Haidar and his son in 1816. In Lucknow, the Nawab granted him a "Robe of Honor" and he was given the distinction of riding with the Nawab on his elephant. His monthly salary in this period was around 2,000 rupees.

=== Later life ===
After a three-year stay as the court jeweler, Cohen left Lucknow with a group of more than one hundred people who were employed by him. In 1828, he had an audience with the Governor General of India, Lord William Cavendish Bentinck.

Towards the end of his life, Cohen traveled to the court of Maharaja Ranjit Singh in Punjab and was asked to appraise the Kohinoor diamond. According to legend, he responded by saying the diamond had no value at all – for it could only be given in love or captured by war.

== Legacy ==
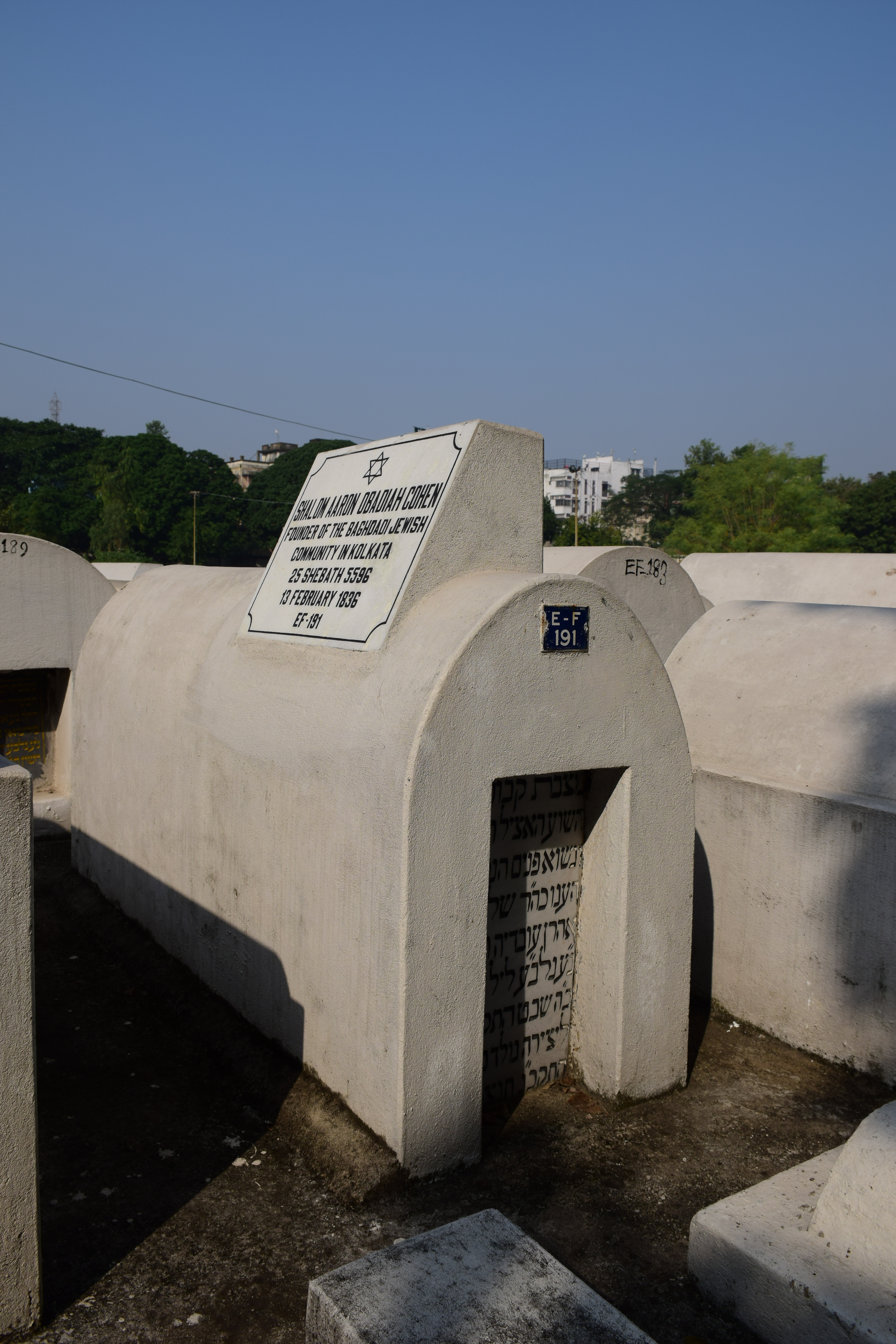
Shalom Cohen's grave in the Jewish Cemetery of Beleghata

Cohen and his son-in-law Moses Duek were two of the founders of Kolkata's first synagogue, Neveh Shalome, in 1831.

He also provided land to establish the first Jewish cemetery on Narkeldanga Road, namely Jewish Cemetery, Kolkata. He is said to have been offered this land as a gift from a Bengali friend when he inquired about land for a Jewish cemetery. His friend refused to accept payment, but Cohen, unwilling to receive the land for free, gave him a golden ring as payment. The cemetery is still in use by the few remaining members of the Kolkata Jewish community today, and Cohen is buried there.

Shalom is featured in the children's book Shalome Rides a Royal Elephant. It was written by his descendant, Jael Silliman.

== See also ==
- History of the Jews in India
