= History of the Jews in Kolkata =

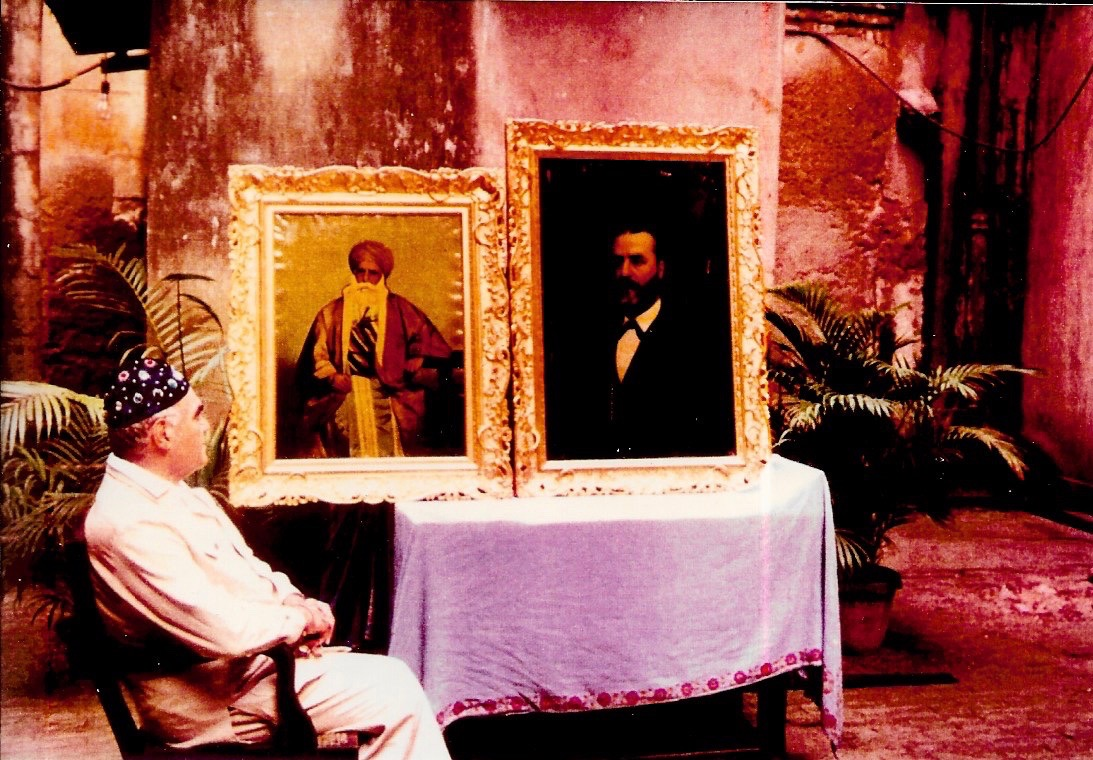
A Baghdadi Jewish man contemplates his heritage, late 20th century

The history of the Jews in Kolkata ( Judeo-urdu : קולקַתָּה [/koːlˈkət̪ːaː/] )formerly known as Calcutta , in India, began in the late eighteenth century when adventurous Baghdadi Jewish merchants originally from Aleppo and Baghdad chose to establish themselves permanently in the emerging capital of the British Raj. The community they founded became the hub of the Judeo-Arabic-speaking Baghdadi Jewish trading diaspora in Asia.

In the early nineteenth century the community grew rapidly, drawing mostly on Jewish migrants from Baghdad and to a lesser extent on those from Aleppo. Historically it was led by a flourishing merchant elite trading in cotton, jute, spices and opium issued from the leading Jewish families of Baghdad and Aleppo.

Mercantile Baghdadi Jewish families based in the city tied together through bonds of marriage or commerce the smaller Baghdadi Jewish communities trading across Asia including in Rangoon, Singapore, Hong Kong and Shanghai with the larger Jewish communities in Mumbai and the Middle East.

During the late nineteenth century Kolkata was a minor intellectual centre of Iraqi Jews before the Baghdadi Jews began to slowly transition from a Judeo-Arabic identity towards a more Judeo-British and one under the leadership of the mercantile Sassoon, Ezra, Elias, Gubbay, Belilios and Judah families. In their heyday such mercantile Kolkata Jews sponsored numerous leading religious and charitable institutions in Palestine, Lebanon and Iraq.

During the mid-twentieth century the Baghdadi Jewish community peaked at over 6,000 members during the Second World War as smaller communities fled Japanese invasions or internments. This highpoint was followed by a long precipitously decline in numbers.

The community started emigration after Indian independence in 1947, in two waves with the first wave moving mainly to Australia, Canada, U.K , Israel and the USA and the second wave moving to Great Britain , Germany , France and the Netherlands. While migration followed the turmoil of partition, the breakdown of the colonial trading system in Asia, severing historic trade flows between the Middle East and Asia, and the birth of a Jewish state in Palestine , the second migration came from a hightening of communal tensions and regular communal disturbances in kolkata. The few remaining maintained their Judeo-Indian identity and achieved prominent positions in the military, politics and the arts.

In the early twenty-first century fewer than twenty Jews remain in the city , mostly as caretakers of Jewish properties and institutions in the city . The synagogues that remain are some of the last surviving and presently accessible heritage sites founded by Baghdadi Jews in Kolkata.

== Early history ==
During the British rule in India, Kolkata was a thriving metropolis, the capital of British India and the commercial hub of India. It attracted numerous trading communities including the Jews. The first recorded Jewish immigrant to Kolkata was Shalom Obadiah Cohen, who arrived in Kolkata in 1798. Cohen was born in Aleppo in present-day Syria in 1762. He arrived in Surat in the year 1792 and established himself as a trader before moving to Kolkata. In 1805, his nephew Moses Simon Duek Ha Cohen arrived in Kolkata. He married his eldest daughter Lunah. In the early nineteenth century the Baghdadi Jews began to settle in large numbers in Kolkata, thus outnumbering the Jews from Aleppo.

The community grew rapidly, in terms of both size and prestige, as Jews from Iraq fled the persecution of the rule Dawud Pasha (1817–1831) in what was then a province of the Ottoman Empire, including many of the most illustrious families of Baghdad. The Iraqi Jews, mostly from Baghdad, soon outnumbered the original settlers from Aleppo. By the end of the nineteenth century the Kolkata community numbered some 1,800 people.

== Culture ==
Throughout its heyday the Baghdadi Jewish community was dominated by its leading families including the Ezras, Elias, Judahs, Sassoons, Belilios and Musleahs. These leading families intermarried over the generations. The Ezra family was the dominant family in the Baghdadi Jewish community for much of its history and much of the communal political history of the Baghdadi Jews of Kolkata revolved around the acceptance or opposition to their dominance.

However this merchant elite whose firms amassed fabulous wealth, employed a great many of the Baghdadi Jewish community, whilst running the community's religious institutions and funding its charitable system, numbered less than forty families. The rest were shopkeepers, pedlars, brokers, artisans, factory workers or clerks. As a rule the community stuck to trade, finance and commerce with relatively few of the Baghdadi Jewish community entered either government service or the professions. As many as fifty percent of the Baghdadi Jewish community of Kolkata was poor and dependent on communal Jewish charity.

Throughout the nineteenth and twentieth centuries the grand merchant families who formed the nucleus of the Baghdadi Jewish community travelled widely building their fortunes across the Middle East and Asia. They continuously strove to maintain a balance between embracing the European culture that characterized the mostly British elite upper class to which they aspired, and a steadfast fidelity to their ancestral faith and traditions. They expressed their devotion to Jewish traditions through the sponsoring of elaborate synagogues, religious seminaries, ritual scrolls and books across Asia and the Middle East.

Nevertheless, the identity of the community evolved. The first generation of Jewish settlers in Kolkata in the early 19th century spoke Judeo-Arabic at home and adhered to their Arabic style of costumes in public. Slowly and unevenly this began to change as the second generation of Jews born in Kolkata adopted European dress and lifestyle and English as their language of communication. By 1906 it was recorded that as amongst the wealthier Jews in their habits and dress were European though their vernacular remained Arabic. Amongst lower social classes older generations retained Arabic style of dress while younger generations had adopted the European one. Their identities evolved too from a Judeo-Arabic identity towards a Judeo-British one.

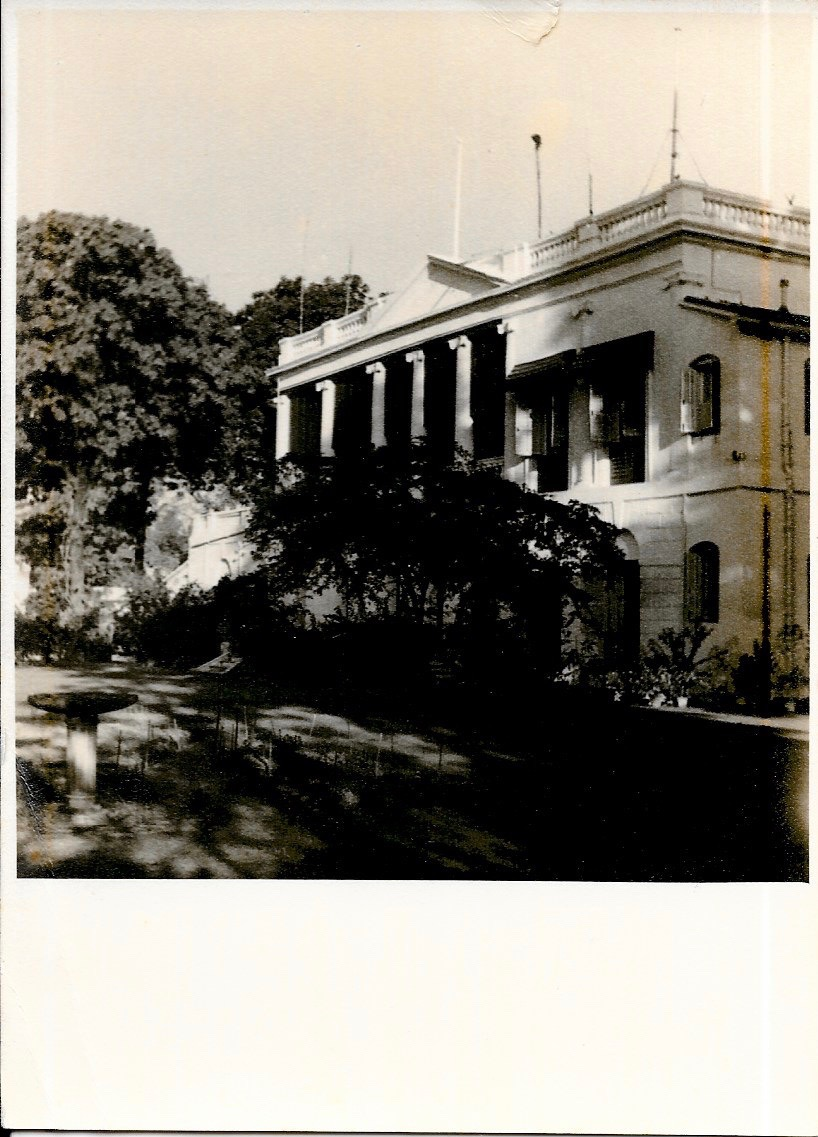
The Calcutta home of Moise Abraham Sassoon, in the early 20th century. One of the grand residences of the Baghdadi Jewish merchant elite.

Kolkata in the late nineteenth century was a minor centre of Iraqi-Jewish intellectual production with numerous Judeo-Arabic newspapers, closely covering events in Baghdad and the Middle East, with books in Hebrew and Judeo-Arabic printed in Kolkata. In the early twentieth century intellectual production in Kolkata declined with as Judeo-Arabic cultural production declined. A new wave of English language and Zionist orientated newspapers and clubs flourishing in the mid twentieth century before Indian Independence. Middle class and poorer Jews were the ones drawn to Zionism and its new popular community associations. Throughout the closing decades of the nineteenth century and early twentieth century the community grew more British-orientated in cultural habits, dress and aspirations.

However the Baghdadi Jews of British India, including Kolkata, were denied the legal inclusion as Europeans during British rule. In 1885, the Baghdadi Jews were reclassified as from the government from European to native. It has been argued their late arrival in India and pale skin, as well as social habits and styles of dress, had seen them initially classified as European. The community was horrified to discover in 1885 their schools were no longer classified as European. For the remainder of British rule the Baghdadi Jews struggled to be recognised as European. They sought exemption from the 1878 Indian Arms Act which forbade natives from carrying arms but were not successful. They sought to be moved from the non-Muslim native electorate to the European electoral roll in 1929 and 1935 for elections to the Bengal Legislative Council, but were not successful. Many were resentful that the British would not socialise with them or permit them membership of the whites-only clubs that elite life in colonial Kolkata revolved around or shared a sense the British were conquerors who ignored the Jews.

The intellectual leadership of the Kolkata community amongst the Baghdadi Jewish community in Asia and its higher educational level can be noted in the fact that of all the memoirs written of Indian Baghdadi Jewish almost all were written by members of the Kolkata community.

== Emigration ==
Following Indian Independence majority of the Baghdadi Jewish population began to rapidly emigrate to London, to where the richer Baghdadi Jewish merchant families had been drawn for a generation. The community was deeply affected by the Great Kolkata Killing of 1946 that saw 4,000 killed and 100,000 made homeless in seventy-two hours of Hindu-Muslim communal violence. Rioting between 1945 and 1947 also killed numerous Europeans. Scenes of devastation that unsettled the Baghdadi Jewish community included vultures feasting on piles of human remains in the streets of Kolkata. Both the extreme violence of Indian Partition between Hindus and Muslims and the Bengal Famine witnessed during World War Two frightened the Baghdadi Jewish community and led them to believe there was no future for them in the city.

Mass emigration began in a moment of extreme economic dislocation. In the space of a few years the transnational colonial trading system in which they had prospered was dismantled. In India, new economic regulations enacted by the Indian Government restricted imports and controlled foreign exchange, seriously hampering the business of the Baghdadi Jewish merchants families which led the community.

The merchant elite families emigrated rapidly as there was talk of the imposition of socialism and the nationalization of banks and they felt emigration was essential to secure their wealth. They are unsure whether they would be soon stop being able to take money out of the country. The emigration of the wealthier families saw their businesses close and since they employed other Baghdadi Jews those too began to seek jobs abroad.

The atmosphere in Calcutta at independence, rocked by Hindu-Muslim riots as millions were displaced and hundreds of thousands died across the country in partition was unsettled. The Japanese invasion of China, Burma and Singapore has already seen a mass flight of the Baghdadi Jews settled there to Kolkata. Many of these were able to secure refugee status in the United States.

Within a few years of Indian Independence, a series of major geopolitical events occurred that had serious economic implications for the community, including the communist takeover in China, the mass flight of Iraqi Jews to the new state of Israel, the collapse of the Dutch East Indies, and successive nationalist revolutions in Iraq, Syria and Egypt. Emigration of Baghdadi Jewish business owners was soon followed by those they employed.

Most Baghdadi Jews felt they now had to decide which citizenship to choose. From 1947 to 1952, all those living in India still held British Indian passports. Consequently, all those Indians who wanted to emigrate and could afford the fare left India. By 1951 only 1,500 Jews remained in Kolkata.

Most of the wealthier Baghdadi Jewish merchant families from Kolkata with ties to the British establishment and the Sassoon family settled in West London where they soon formed the majority of the historic Spanish and Portuguese Jews Congregation in Maida Vale. Those immigrants less wealthy settled in Golders Green in North London. By the early 1960s Golders Green had become home to a larger Baghdadi Jewish diaspora from Shanghai, Burma, India and Singapore who founded numerous small synagogues following the Mizrahi Jewish rite. By the end of the 1950s there were more Kolkata Jews in Golders Green than in Kolkata at the time.

There was also a great desire in the Baghdadi Jewish community to settle in Australia but following 1948 the country secretly implemented an immigration policy excluding Jews from the Middle East and Asia from settling in the country frustrating Baghdadi Jews from emigrating there. However, in the early 1950s the Baghdadi Jews alongside other minority populations in India were granted the right to migrate to Australia as the White Australia immigration policy was progressively dismantled. This saw considerable Baghdadi Jewish emigration from Kolkata to Australia. It has been estimated a third of the Baghdadi Jewish community of Kolkata eventually settled in Sydney in Australia with the remainder not departing to Britain settling in Israel.

Despite support and interest in Zionism in Kolkata before World War Two relatively few of the Baghdadi Jews from Kolkata eventually settled permanently in Israel. Baghdadi Jews from India settled in concentration in Ramat Eliyahu, Ashdod and the Kurdani neighborhood near Haifa and in across Israel's major cities. Broadly those that did settle in Israel did not maintain a communal identity but merged with the wider Iraqi Jewish community.

Those that stayed in India embraced new Judeo-Indian identities in the new state. However, in the Kolkata the Jewish population had shrunk to 700 people by 1969 ( though it did bounce back slightly through the decades after ) . The mass refugee influx and a sharp rise in radical left politics had further unsettled West Bengal. The 1960s saw further communal riots and the Congress Party lose power in 1967 to the United Left Front, the first of a series of hard left alliances to govern West Bengal, which remained in power for the rest of the twentieth century. The late 1960s saw the renaming colonial legacy companies and families depart as the left wing government severely impacted trade.

Against this background the rich fabric of community institutions and charitable support networks unravelled with the departure of the remains of the merchant family elite. The closing of the B.N. Elias mills in 1973 deprived many Baghdadi Jews of jobs and formed one of the final blows to the Jewish working class community in the city , the jews that still remained employed in kolkata were old merchant and trading families with these old jewish merchant houses taking in some of the now unemployed mill workers . Without the historic leadership and charity of most of the merchant families , and the remaining merchant families no longer being able to maintain a special position in kolkata society , communal jewish life became hard to maintain. Lack of opportunities for both business, high quality education , increasing communal pressure from the lack of a large jewish in kolkata anymore and lack in particular for Jewish marriages in Kolkata speeded up the community's dissolution in the late twentieth century. By the twenty-first century less than twenty Jews remained in the city , mostly as caretakers of the properterial jewish presence in Kolkata .

== Synagogues ==
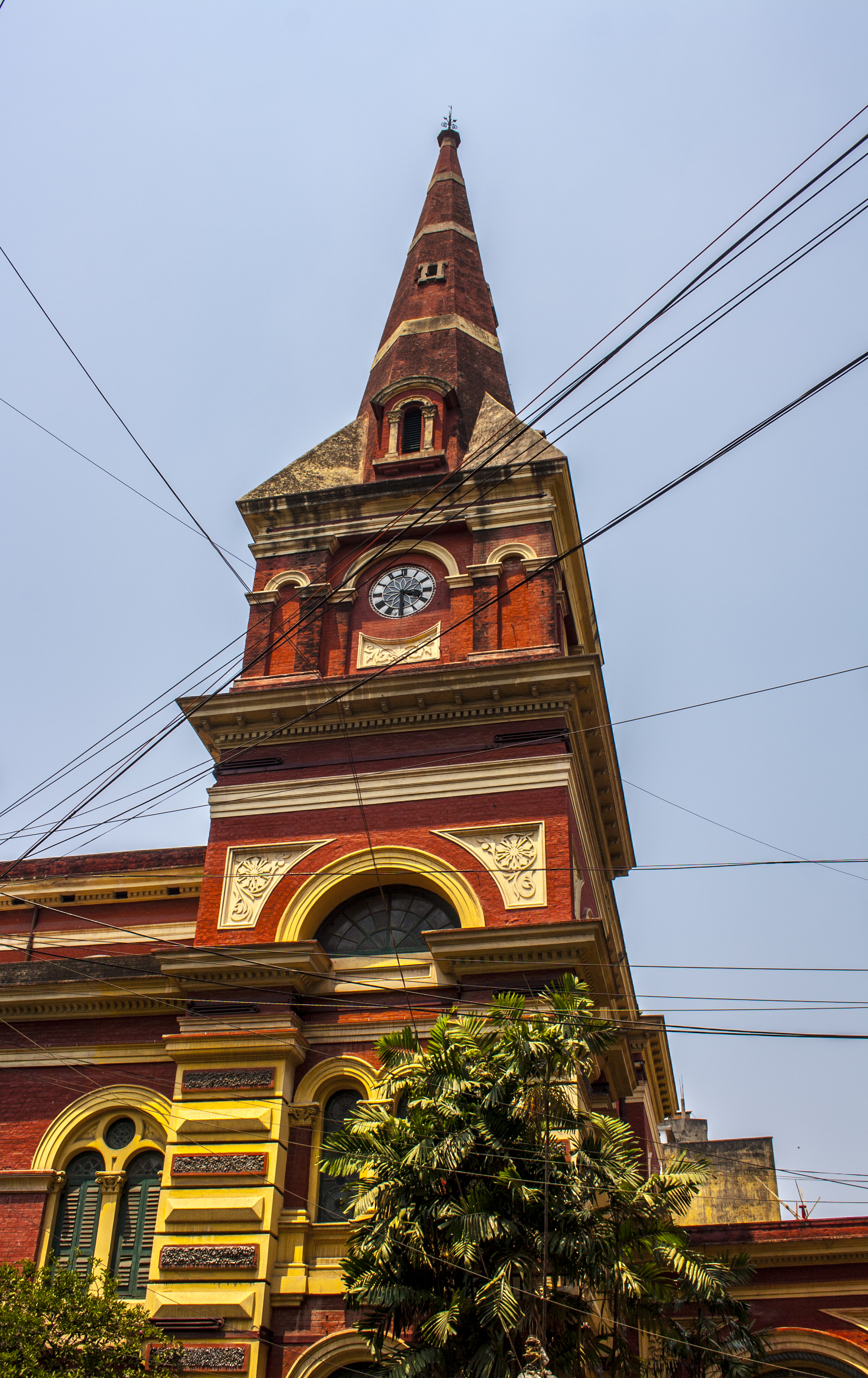
Magen David Synagogue in Kolkata

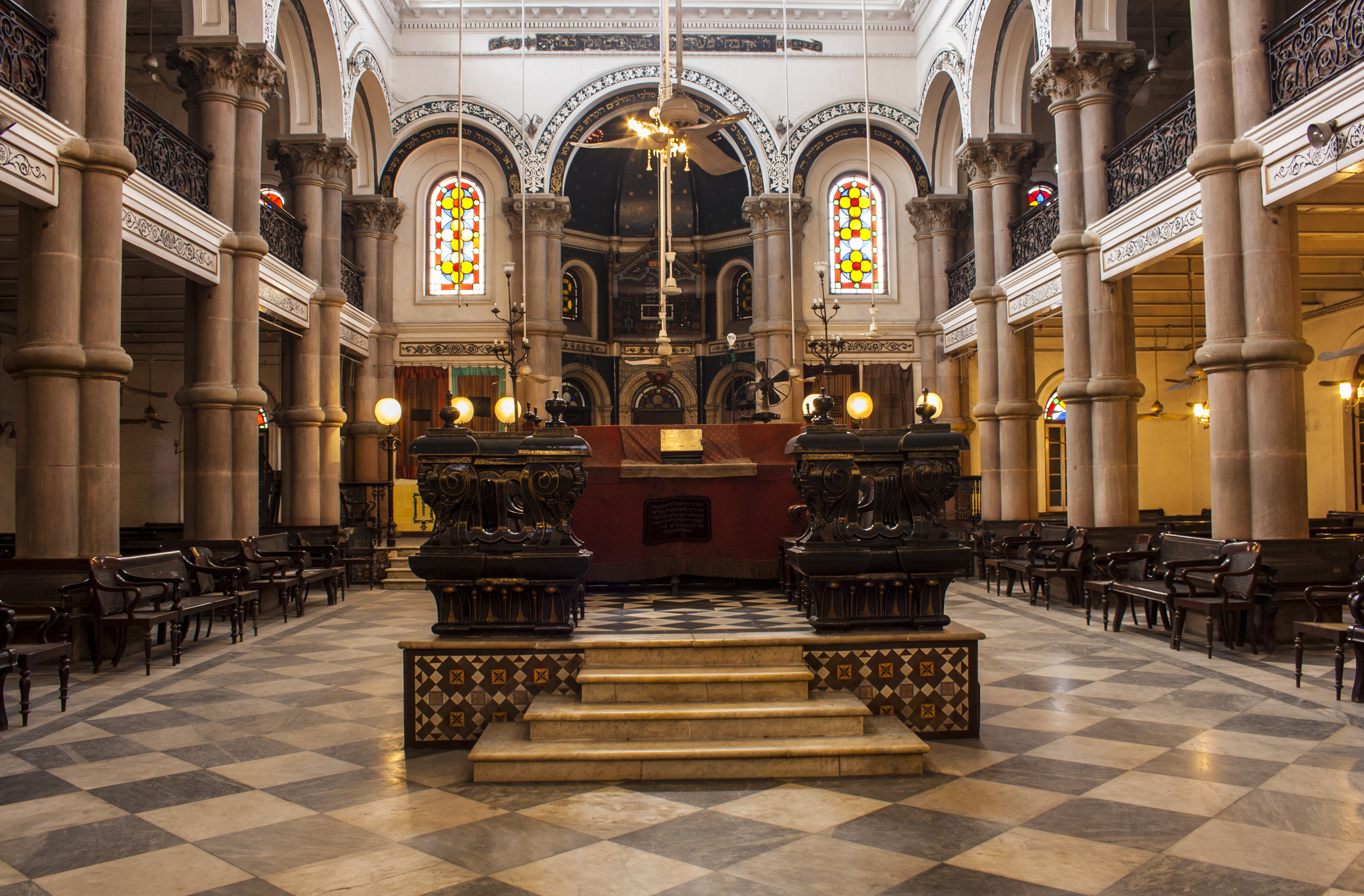
Interiors in Magen David Synagogue, Kolkata

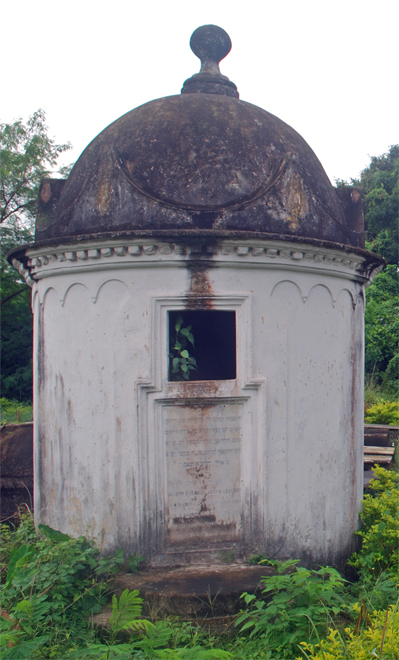
Genizah at Jewish cemetery, Kolkata

The Jewish community established five independent synagogues in Kolkata, out of which regular prayers are only heard in one. The first synagogue, now known as the Old Synagogue, was built by Shalome David Cohen.

One of the pivotal figures in building the synagogue of Kolkata was Ezekiel Judah. Ezekiel Judah was an esteemed talmudist who led the Baghdadi Jewish community in Kolkata in spiritual matters during his lifetime, building two synagogues. He was a leading indigo merchant who traded in silks and muslins. A descendant of Solomon Ma’tuk his family name was seen as highly aristocratic amongst Iraqi Jews. One of his sons by his first wife was a leader of the Jews in Baghdad. Another son conducted a Yeshiva in Jerusalem founded by Ezekiel Judah at which ten scholars constantly studied the Torah and recited prayers. For a year after Ezekiel Judah's death, his sons invited scholars from Jerusalem, Syria and Baghdad as well as the poor of Calcutta to study the Torah.

In 1825, Ezekiel Judah built the Neveh Shalom Synagogue on Canning Street. It was rebuilt in 1911. In 1856, Ezekiel Judah and David Joseph Ezra built the Beth El Synagogue on Pollock Street. It was rebuilt and extended in 1886 by Elias Shalom Gubbay. In 1884, Elias David Joseph Ezra built the Magen David Synagogue in memory of his father David Joseph Ezra.

Along with Ezekiel Judah this construction made the other pivotal figures in building the synagogues of Kolkata were the Ezra family, both David Joseph Ezra and his son Elias David Joseph Ezra. The Ezra family were seen as one of the preeminent Baghdadi Jewish merchant families in the city in the late nineteenth and early twentieth century. The name Ezra was seen as a highly aristocratic name amongst Iraqi Jews.

Today the three surviving synagogues of Kolkata were restored in the early twentieth-first century and are unique in being some of the few surviving currently accessible synagogues built by Iraqi Jews. Two further synagogues formerly existed but have not survived as part of Kolkata's Jewish heritage. The smaller Magen Aboth, dating back to 1897, is now demolished and Shaare Rason, dating to 1933, is now closed.

== Jewish cemetery ==
The Jewish cemetery, Kolkata is located on Narkeldanga Main Road. It was a Muslim Bengali friend of Shalom Obadiah Cohen, the founder of the Jewish community of Calcutta, who sold him the land to build the cemetery. The first recorded death in the Kolkata Jewish community was Moses de Pas, an emissary from Safed, now in Israel, who died in 1812 in Kolkata. The cemetery contains a late Nineteenth century genizah for the ritual disposition of sacred writings.

The cemetery reflects the Baghdadi culture of the community and its evolution. Nineteenth and early Twentieth century Baghdadi graves are rounded and flat following the traditional Sephardic and Mizrahi pattern. In the mid twentieth century a few standing tombstones marking the graves of Ashkenazi Jews appear. Later graves of the wealthier Baghdadi Jews, from the 1930s onwards, are more decorative and use English and not just Hebrew, showing growing Westernisation of the community.

The cemetery contains around 2,000 graves almost all of them from prior to the community's mass emigration in the mid-Twentieth century. The cemetery fell into disrepair in the late twentieth century but was renovated in the early twenty-first century and is currently well maintained.

== Notable persons ==
- David Joseph Ezra
- David Elias Ezra
- Elias David Ezra
- Shalom Obadiah Cohen, Founder of the Calcutta Jewish community
- J. F. R. Jacob, Indian Army Lieutenant General
- David Jacob Cohen, Jewish Member of the Bengal Legislative Council
- Regina Guha, First Jewish Principal of the Girls' School, first Lady Lawyer in the Community
- Manny Elias, musician
- Gerry Judah, artist
- Ezra Mir (Edwyn Meyers), Indian film-maker
- Esther Victoria Abraham, Indian actress and winner of the first Miss India pageant
- Emanuel Raphael Belilios, Businessman in Hong Kong
- Manasseh Meyer, Leader and benefactor of the Jewish community in Singapore

== See also ==
- Bengali cuisine
