= Magen David Synagogue (Kolkata) =

Synagogue in Kolkata, West Bengal, India

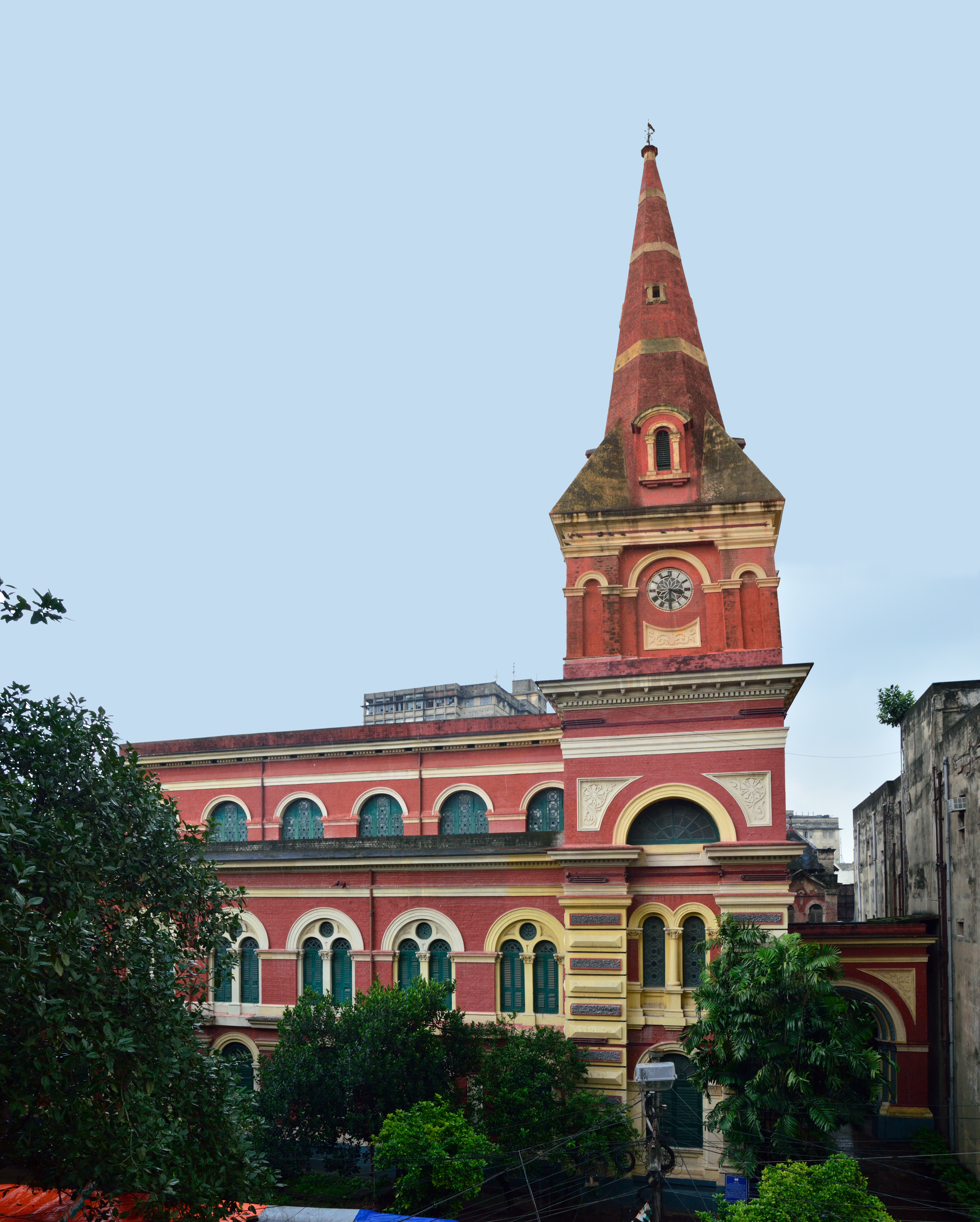

Religion
- Affiliation: Judaism
- Rite: Baghdadi Jews
- Status: Protected Monument under ASI

Location
- Location: Burrabazar, Kolkata
- Interactive map of Magen David Synagogue
- Coordinates: 22.577694481559167°N 88.35194239008337°E

Architecture
- Type: Italian Renaissance
- Completed: 11 September 1884

Specifications
- Length: 140 feet (43 m)
- Width: 80 feet (24 m)
- Spire height: 140 feet (43 m)

Magen David Synagogue (or the "Shield of David") is located at the junction of Brabourne Road and Canning Street (Biplabi Rashbehari Road) in Kolkata. Magen David is the second operating synagogue in Kolkata; the other is the Beth El Synagogue at Pollock Street.

== History and architecture ==
The synagogue was built in 1884 by Elias David Ezra in memory of his father David Joseph Ezra, who made his fortune in the real estate trade of Kolkata. Elias David Joseph Ezra is associated with some of the well known buildings of Kolkata including Esplanade Mansion, Ezra Mansion and Chowringhee Mansion. Ezra Street is also named after him.

The complex also houses the Neveh Shalome Synagogue, Calcutta's oldest existing synagogue.

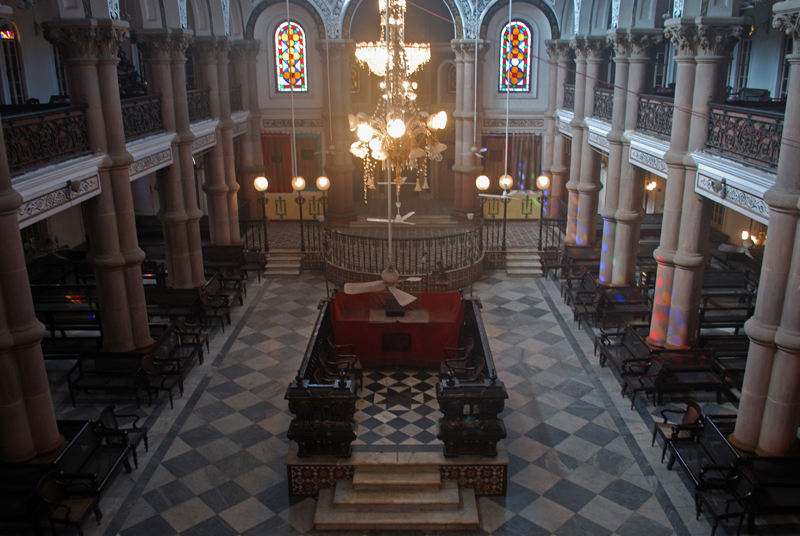
Magen David interiors

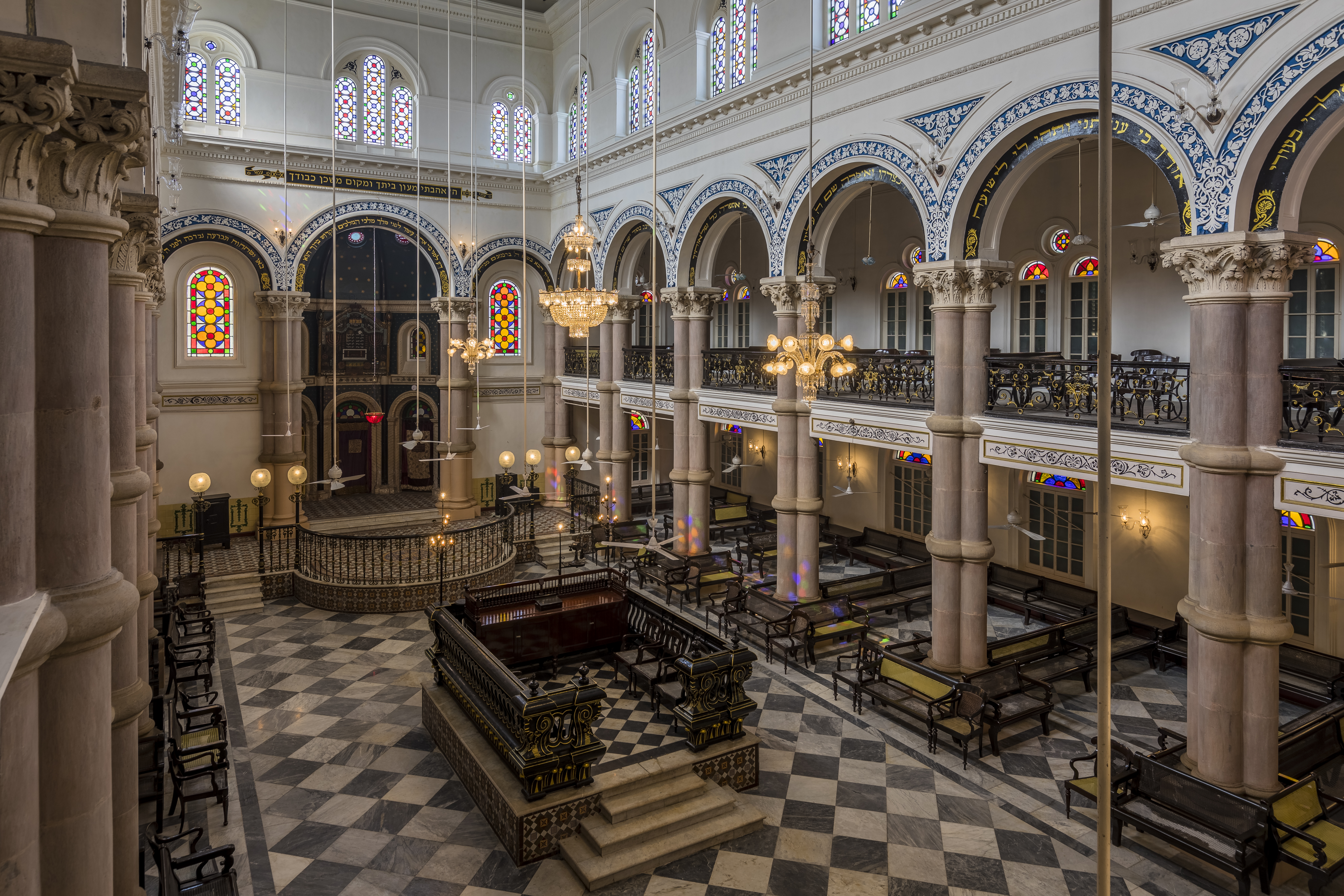
Interiors after restoration

The synagogue is built in the Italian Renaissance style with a brick red finish. The entrance to the synagogue compound is hidden behind makeshift stalls selling hairclips and other trinkets. The Magen David Synagogue is approached through an arched door, containing the hexagonal "Star of David" and Hebrew inscription. The two side walls contains memorial plaques dedicated to the well known Jews of Calcutta (Kolkata). Although the services of the Magen David Synagogue have long stopped, the interior is astonishingly well maintained. The chequered marble floor, gleaming chandeliers, stained glass windows and ornate floral pillars shipped from Paris enhance its Continental look. The ark of the Magen David Synagogue is set into the walls of an apse. The star-studded half dome of the apse represents the heavens. The large plaque above the middle section of the ark contains the Ten Commandments. It also contains several other Hebrew inscription along with several other items of Jewish Iconography, including the seven branched lamp stand of the menorah. High above the wall opposite the ark is a beautiful stained glass rose window. At the centre of the hall is the bimah, the raised platform from which the Torah was read. Two sets of stairs from either side of the hall lead to the upper balconies, reserved for women.

== Jewish community of Kolkata ==
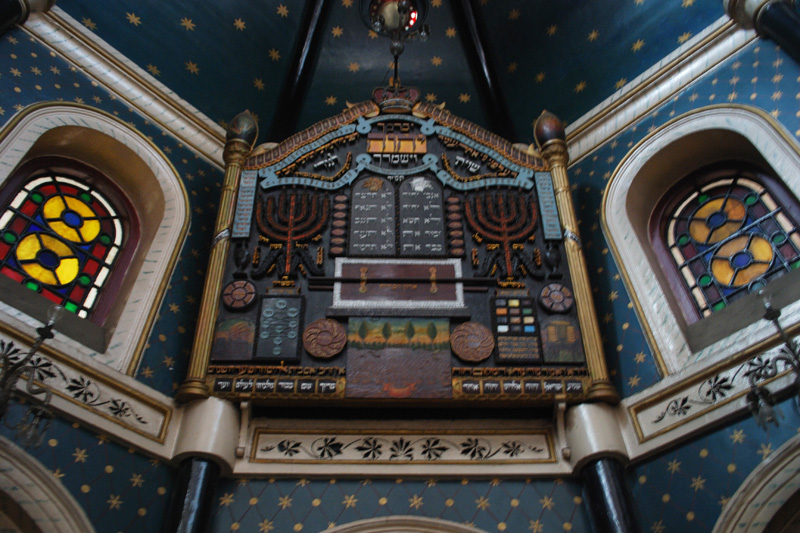
Magen David Apse

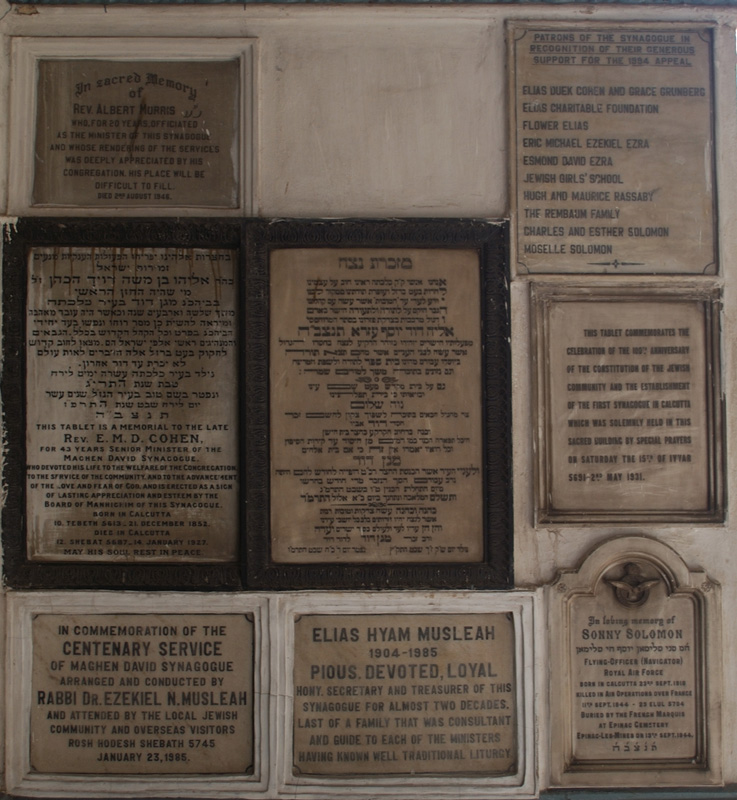
Magen David memorial plaques

Kolkata's Jews are mostly Baghdadi Jews who came to Kolkata to trade. At one point as strong as 6,000, the community dwindled to about 60 after the formation of Israel. Today there are only about 30 Jews left in Kolkata. The first recorded Jewish immigrant to Kolkata was Shalom Cohen in 1798 from Aleppo in present-day Syria. The most influential Jewish family in Kolkata was perhaps the father-son real estate magnates David Joseph Ezra and Elias David Ezra. The family founded the Jewish Girls School.

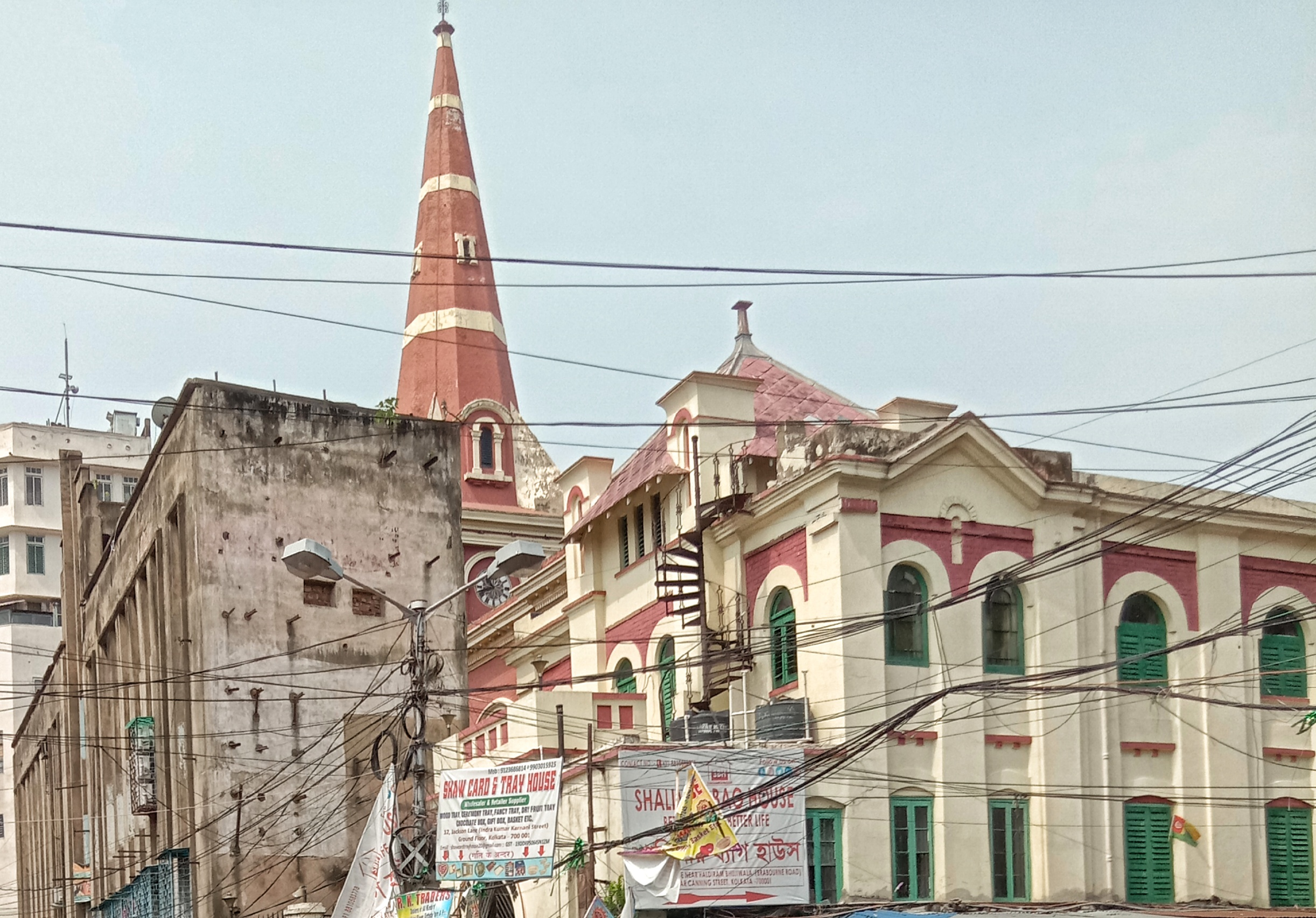
Magen David Synagogue as seen from Brabourne road

The community had five independent synagogues in Kolkata, out of which the Magen David, Neveh Shalome, and Beth El operate to this day. Magen David and the neighbouring Neveh Shalome are accessible to the public as they are under the protection of the Archaeological Survey of India.

The Jewish confectioner and bakery Nahoum's in the New Market holds a special place in Kolkata confectionery. Founded in 1902, Nahoum's moved to its present location in the New Market in 1916. A permission from the Nahoum Shop is required to visit the synagogues of Kolkata.

== See also ==
- History of the Jews in India
- List of synagogues in India
- Jews of Kolkata
