= Esplanade Mansions, Kolkata =

Jewish mansion in Kolkata, India

Esplanade Mansion
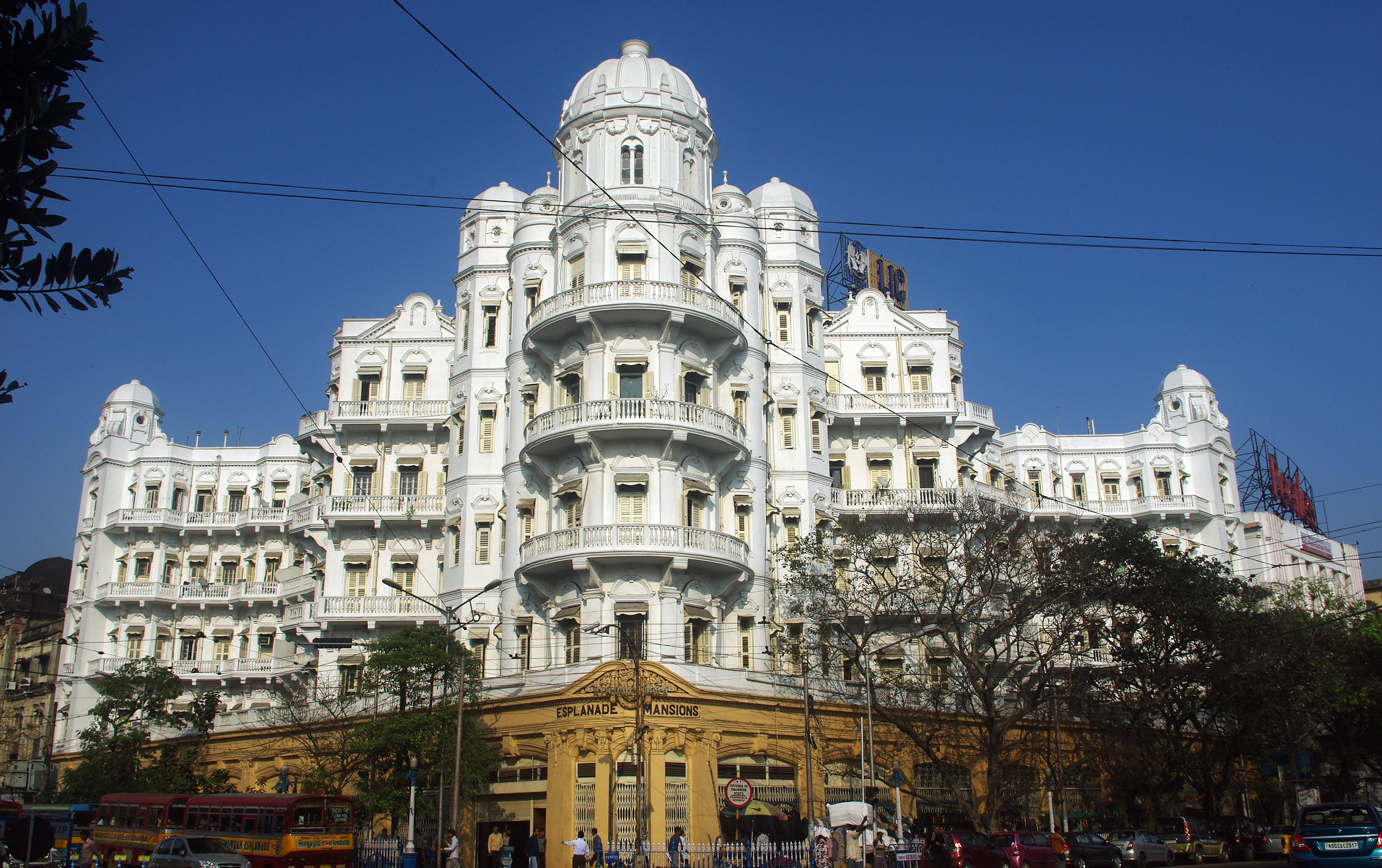
- Esplanade Mansion front view, 2014
- Interactive map of the Esplanade Mansion area

General information
- Architectural style: Art Nouveau
- Location: Kolkata, West Bengal, Esplanade, 700069, India
- Coordinates: 22°33′59″N 88°20′56″E
- Completed: 1910
- Owner: Life Insurance Corporation

Design and construction
- Architects: Martin & Co,

The Esplanade Mansions is a heritage building located in the Indian city of Kolkata, on the Esplanade Row and Marx Engels Beethi Road crossing, opposite to the Raj Bhavan. It was one of the buildings owned by Jewish businessman David Elias Ezra. The residential building was built in the Art Nouveau architecture style. Today it is owned by Life Insurance Corporation and houses commercial, railways and other government offices.

== Location ==
The Esplanade Mansion is in the city centre, Esplanade opposite the official residence of the governor of West Bengal, Raj Bhavan and Curzon Park. The building occupies a site bounded by Esplanade Row to the south, Marx Engels Beethi Road (or Old Courthouse Street) to the west and James Hickey Sarani (or Dacres Lane) to the east. Nearby major structures include Metropolitan Building, The LaLit Great Eastern, Currency Building etc.

== History ==
It was owned and built by a Jewish business magnate, David Elias Ezra in 1910. He also became the Commissioner of the Calcutta Municipal in 1876 and a member of the Road and Conservancy Committee. Other properties he owned included the Chowringhee Mansions, Ezra Mansions etc. Previously, the site was Scott Thompson's shop and two houses. Martin & Co. was contracted for the construction. It was built as a residential building of the Ezra family. During WWII, it used to be the American Library.

It is the sole Art Nouveau building in the city. A blend of Art Nouveau and Edwardian architecture can be seen in the corner tower and cupola. It has circular balconies and arched windows. The residential property has 24 flats. It is listed as a Grade-I heritage building by the Kolkata Municipal Corporation.

== Today ==
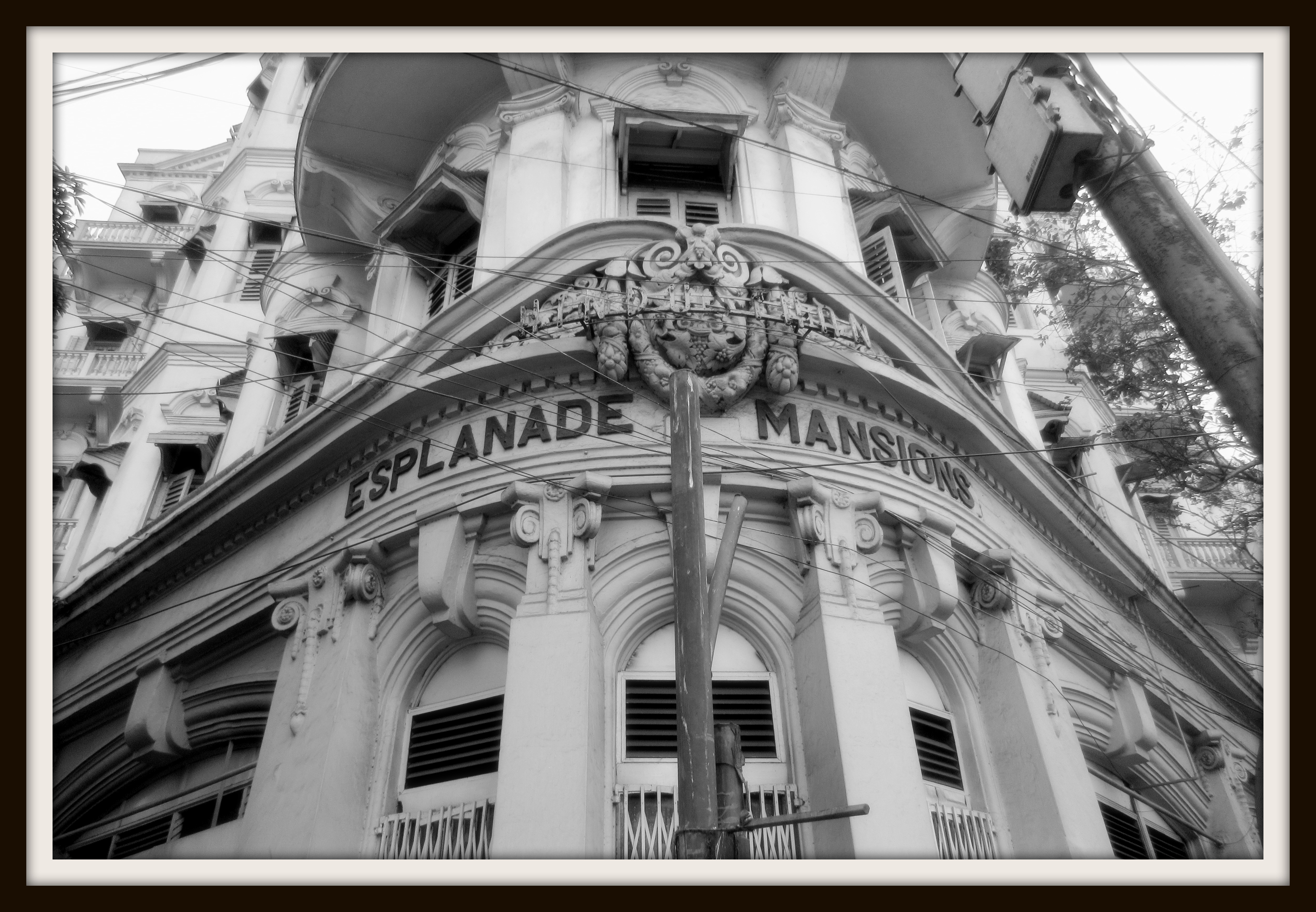
Entrance of the mansion

The Life Insurance Corporation (LIC) owns around 30 properties in Esplanade. The Esplanade Mansions is one of them. It also had the office of the Chief Public Relations Officer of the Eastern Railways on the Raj Bhavan side and the Railway Claims Tribunal on the Curzon Park side, both on the ground floor. In 2003, LIC decided to renovate the building. The colour of the building was changed from lilac to white at a cost of ₹11 lakh (equivalent to ₹40 lakh or US$48,000 in 2023).

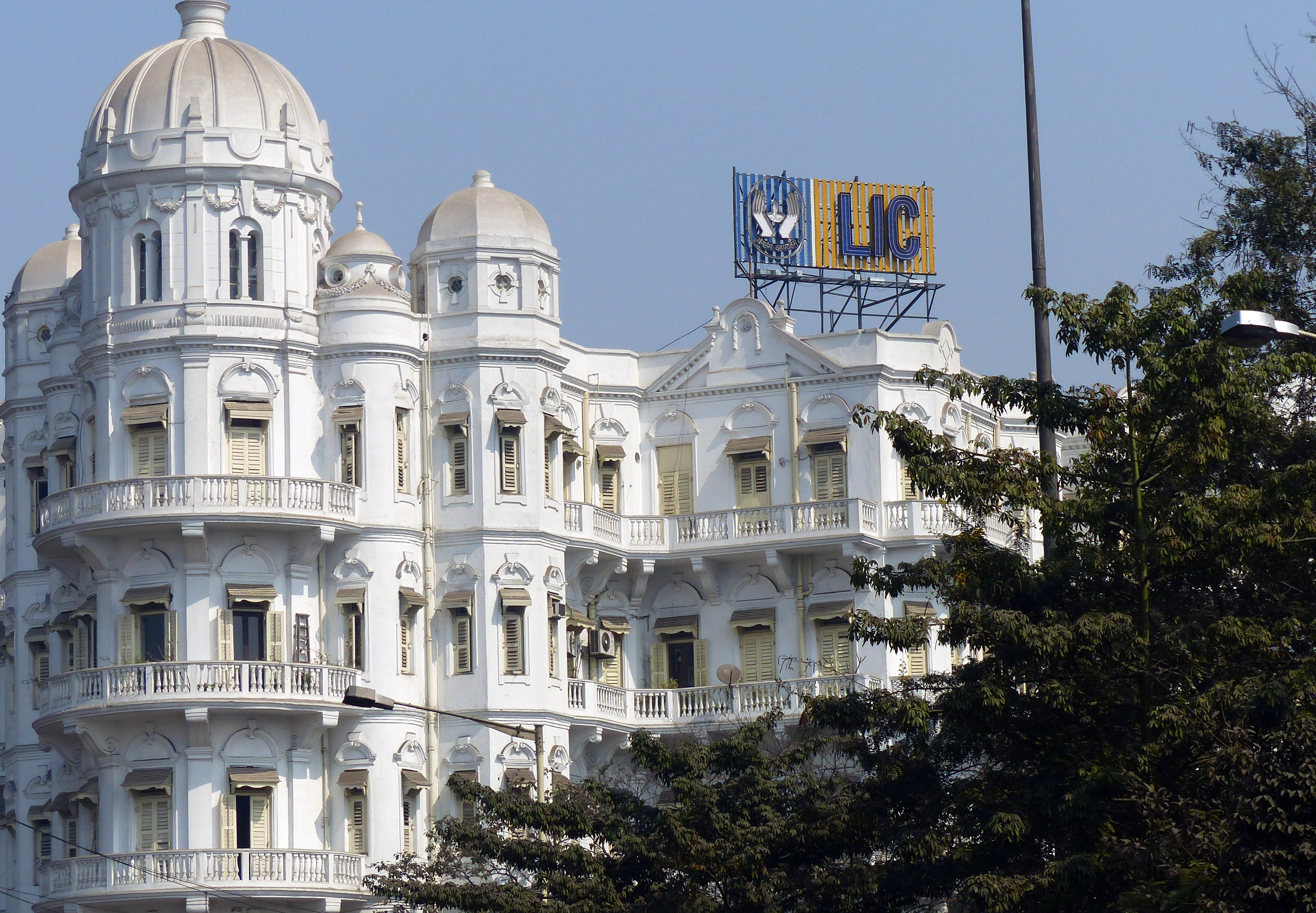

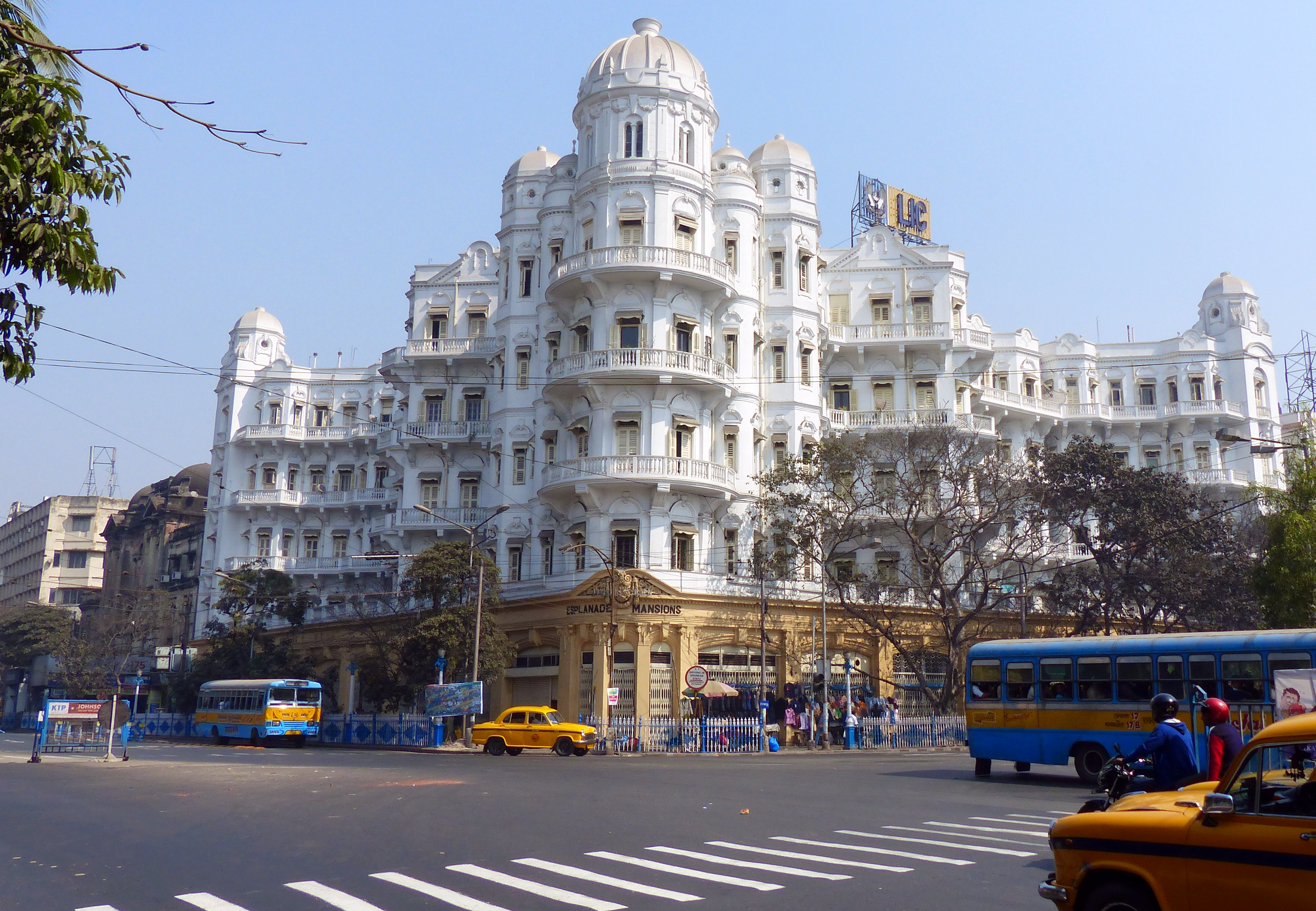

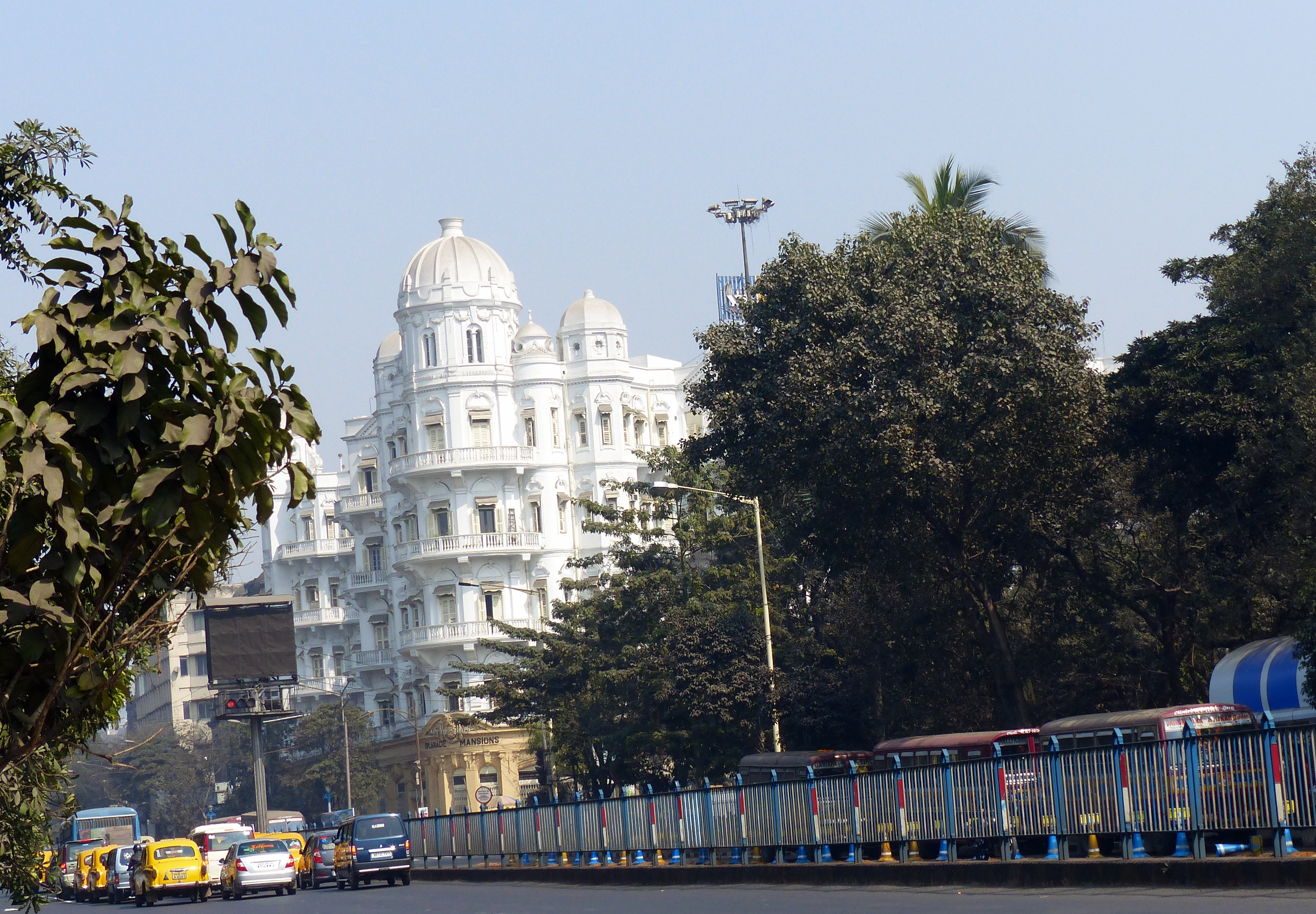

== See also ==
- Dharmatala
- Howrah Bridge
- North Kolkata
- Chowringhee
