= Kadavumbhagam Ernakulam Synagogue =

Synagogue in Kerala, India

Kadavumbhagham Ernakulam Synagogue
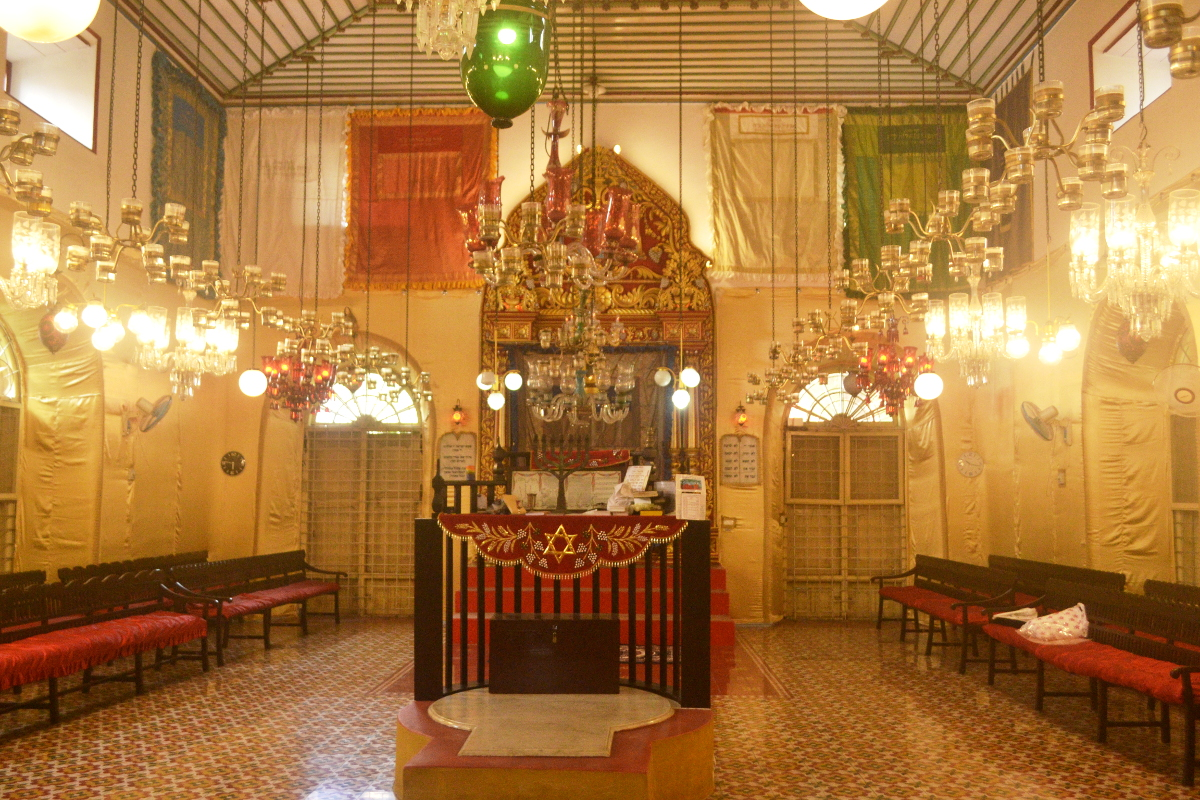
- The synagogue interior, in 2022

Religion
- Affiliation: Judaism
- Ecclesiastical or organizational status: Synagogue
- Status: Active

Location
- Location: Kochi, Ernakulam district, Kerala
- Country: India

Architecture
- Established: 1200 CE

The Kadavumbhagham Ernakulam Synagogue is a Jewish congregation and synagogue, located in Kochi, in the Ernakulam district in the state of Kerala, India.

Established in 1200 CE and restored several times on the same site, it is the oldest synagogue of the Malabar Jews with a Sefer Torah scroll and offering occasional services. The synagogue is modelled on the earliest synagogue of the Malabar Jews at Muziris (currently submerged due to rising sea levels), which date from the time of ancient sea trade between the Mediterranean and Kerala.

Although the former Chendamangalam Synagogue, completed in 1166 CE, is the oldest surviving synagogue structure in Kerala and the Indian subcontinent, its Torah scrolls were taken to Israel by its congregation in 1952. Consequently, the Kadavumbhagham Ernakulam Synagogue is the oldest Malabar Jewish synagogue today (since its restoration in 2018) with a Torah scroll that is occasionally used for services. The Paradesi Sephardic Synagogue at Mattancherry also has Torah scrolls, but was established much later, in 1568 CE.

== History ==
=== Background ===
Several millennia of contact and sea trade between Malabar Jews and local traders in Kerala led to immense cultural exchange between communities. Jewish traders travelled between the Mediterranean region and Kerala in sea vessels similar to uru boats (a type of dhow, which is even today made in Beypore, Kerala).

The Malabar Jews who settled since the times of King Solomon intermingled with the natives and thus share linguistic and cultural aspects with the local people. In contrast, the Sephardic Jews that arrived more recently in 1568 have maintained a distinct identity. Some of the cultural similarities and exchanges between Malabar Jews and Kerala locals can be seen in language use. For instance, tuki refers to 'peacock' in Tamil, corresponding to tukyim in Hebrew. Likewise, metta in Hebrew means 'mattress', and metta also refers to 'mattress' in Malayalam spoken by Kerala Nasrani Syrian Christians of Kerala.

=== Establishment of the congregation ===
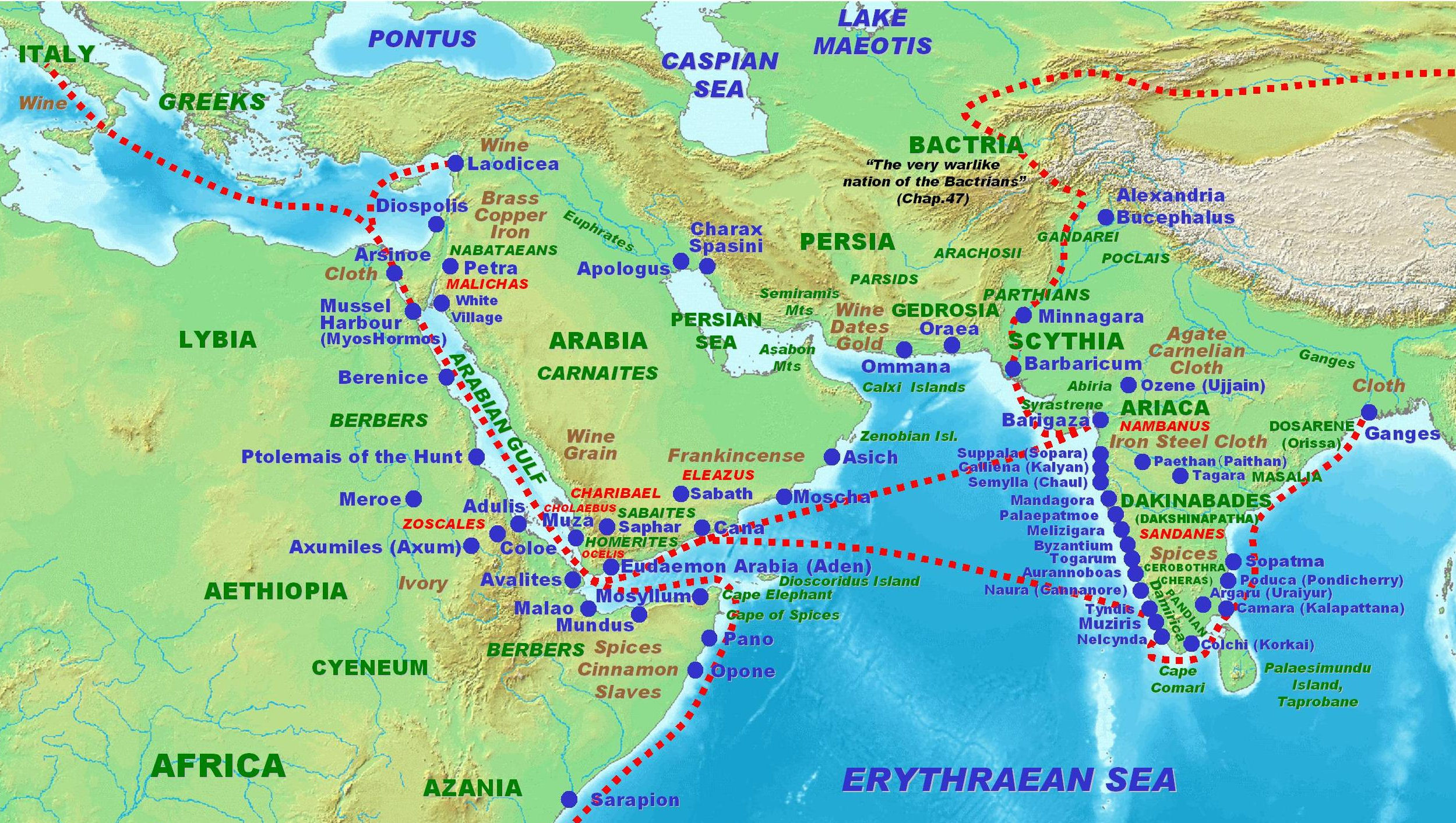
Mediterranean–Kerala spice trade that brought Jews to Kerala

The Kadavambhagam Ernakulam Synagogue belongs to the diaspora of Jews who settled along the southwestern coast of India during the Sangam period (600 BCE – 300 CE), when a chief commodity being traded was black pepper, used for food preservation and other purposes.

In ancient times, the port of Muziris (Muchiri) served as a hub of nautical trade between the Levant (Israel, Phoenicia, Rome) and Kerala. A West Asian trading post emerged in the ancient Muziris region, as mentioned in the Periplus of the Erythraean Sea, written in the 3rd century BCE by a "Greek in Egypt, a Roman subject", as described by the translator Wilfred Harvey Schoff. This periplus refers to the Malabar Coast as 'Limyrike'. The passage 53:17:15–27 mentions Limyrike to begin from Naura (Kannur) and Tyndis (Cerobothra, north of Muziris). The periplus also mentions Nelcynda, which was once the capital of Ay Kingdom.

=== Early Muziris ===
Jews had settled as traders in the Malabar Coast area since the time of King Solomon. The ancient Malabar Jews were present all along the Limyrike through Kollam, Alappuzha, Kottayam, Ezhimala, Pandalayini, and most of all in Muziris. An ancient synagogue was said to have existed in Muziris, but is now believed to be submerged due to gradual rising sea level over the millennia.

Early Jewish settlements also existed in Paloor (Palayur), as evidenced by ruins of an ancient synagogue. Old Malabar Jewish songs also mention Paloor as an important congregation for Jewish tradition along the Malabar Coast. An early Nasrani Palli ('Christian place of worship') was established along the Jewish settlement of Paloor (Palayur) as well—the settlement of Paloor is also mentioned in the Kerala Nasrani Syrian Christian Ramban song. Malabar Cochin Jewish congregational music is in the organum style of music. Even today the song "Yigdal Elohim Chai" has the same tune in Yemenite Jewish tradition and Malabar Jewish tradition.

Several waves of Jews migrated from the Levant to the Malabar Coast of Kerala. The earliest Jewish groups that settled the coast since the time of King Solomon are called the Malabar Jews ('Malabar Yehudan'), who form the original core population of the Cochin Jews. The migration began from 722 BCE after the Assyrian conquest of Israel; further waves were recorded after the destruction of the First Temple by Nebuchadnezzar II, the fall of the Second Temple in 70 CE, the failure of the Bar Kokhba revolt (132 CE), and then subsequent attacks on the Jewish communities by various groups.

=== Regional expansion ===
Later Jewish settlements moved to further inland regions from Muziris. Through the 1200s, additional synagogues were constructed. Both the cities of Mattancherry and Ernakulam (Kochi) each have a Thekkumbhagam synagogue and a Kadavambhagam synagogue. These four synagogues were essentially built as continuations of the synagogue in Muziris.

The present-day Kadavumbhagam Ernakulam Synagogue site is from 1200 CE, although the structure has been renovated. The Jewish settlement of Mala followed, and the Mala Synagogue was established around 1200 CE as well. This synagogue site still exists and has one of the largest graveyards in India spread across 1.6 ha (4 acres).

Additional settlements were at Chendamangalam Synagogue, Paravur Synagogue, Paravur Jew Town, and Paravur Jew Street. The oldest tombstone from this community – the tombstone of Sarah Bet Israel – is today to be seen in the Chendamangalam Synagogue's Jewish cemetery. This is the oldest tombstone in all of the Indian subcontinent and dates from around the time of the synagogue's founding in 1166. Today, the present-day Paravur Synagogue, Jew Town, and Jew Street, and the Chendamangalam Synagogue and Jewish cemetery are all part of the Muziris heritage project.

By the 1300s, Arab traders had settled in the areas under the control of the Zamorin. This earned the Zamorin significantly more taxes from the larger Arab trading population than the smaller Jewish community. As the Arabs gained more prominence in the Kozhikode region, the Jewish population there began to leave or integrate with the Arabs. Even today, there is a Jew Street in Kozhikode.

In the 16th century, Paradesi Jews were the last significant migration of Jews from the Levant, following the Spanish Inquisition in 1492. In 1568, they finished constructing a Sephardic synagogue, known today as the Paradesi Synagogue, near the Kadavambhagam Mattancherry Synagogue.

=== Copper plates ===
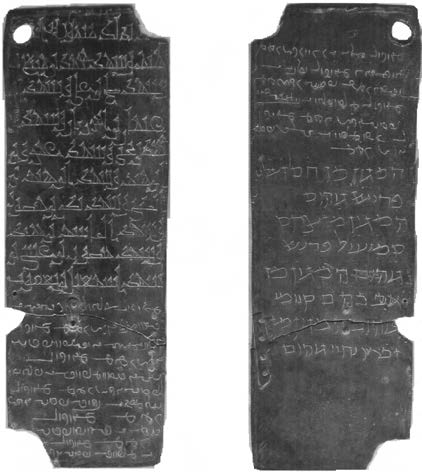
Quilon Syrian copper plates with inscriptions in Old Malayalam, Kufic, and Hebrew (849 and c. 883). Replicas of these were enshrined in the Israel Museum in 2017.

In 1000 CE (though possibly as early as the third century CE), the local ruler of Kerala bestowed the Cochin Jews with copper plates inscribed with 72 privileges (rights). These privileges included being exempt from certain taxes, permission to construct a palanquin, and permission to form a trading guild (anjuvannam). This indicates that their religious leader had a high social standing and favorable position with the king. Similar copper plates were given to the Kerala Nasrani Syrian Christians; these have old Malayalam inscriptions and as well as signatures in Hebrew, Kufic, and Pahlavi. In fact, they have the oldest Hebrew inscriptions in Kerala and India, which are taken as evidence of the presence of Jews in Kerala since antiquity.

In the paper "Kerala and Her Jews", published by Cochin Jewish Synagogue (1984), the Cochin Jewish writers Fiona Hallegua and Shabdai Samuel Koder wrote: "...the Syrian Christian [copper] plates with the signature of four Jewish witnesses in Judeo-Persian, which incidentally is the second oldest inscription in Judeo-Persian in the world, are a few of the ancient relics that can still be seen to remind one of the glorious past of this forgotten outpost of the Jewish world."

In 2017, the Israeli government enshrined a replica of the Kerala Nasrani Syrian Christian copper plates in the Israel Museum in Jerusalem. A plaque was installed citing that the Hebrew inscriptions on the Kollam copper plates from the Mar Thoma Syrian Church, in Thiruvalla, Kerala, are the oldest evidence of the presence of Jews in Kerala and India.

== Present day ==
Following the creation of the modern nation of Israel in 1948, a large portion of the synagogue's congregation immigrated to Israel along with the Torah scrolls. Sabbath services at the Kadavumbhagam Ernakulam Synagogue continued until 1972. For decades, the synagogue remained without any Sabbath services and without a Sefer Torah.

In 2018, the Kadavunbhagham Ernakulam Synagogue was restored, and the Sefer Torah brought back to the synagogue after 46 years. The only other synagogue in Kochi that has Torah scrolls is the Paradesi Synagogue of the Sephardic Jews in Mattancherry. Today, the synagogue is nestled within the bustling market at Ernakulam.

== Architecture ==
The synagogue's ceiling is decorated with intricate carvings. Like many orthodox Jewish synagogues, the synagogue has separate seating for men and women; the women's section is located in the balcony area.

The synagogue has a bimah and a much decorated wooden Torah ark—typically plated with precious metal like gold or silver—that houses the Torah scrolls. The ark constitutes the Holy of Holies, which is separated only by a parochet (curtain). The synagogue also has a sanctuary lamp suspended from the ceiling at the centre of the sanctuary.

== Gallery ==
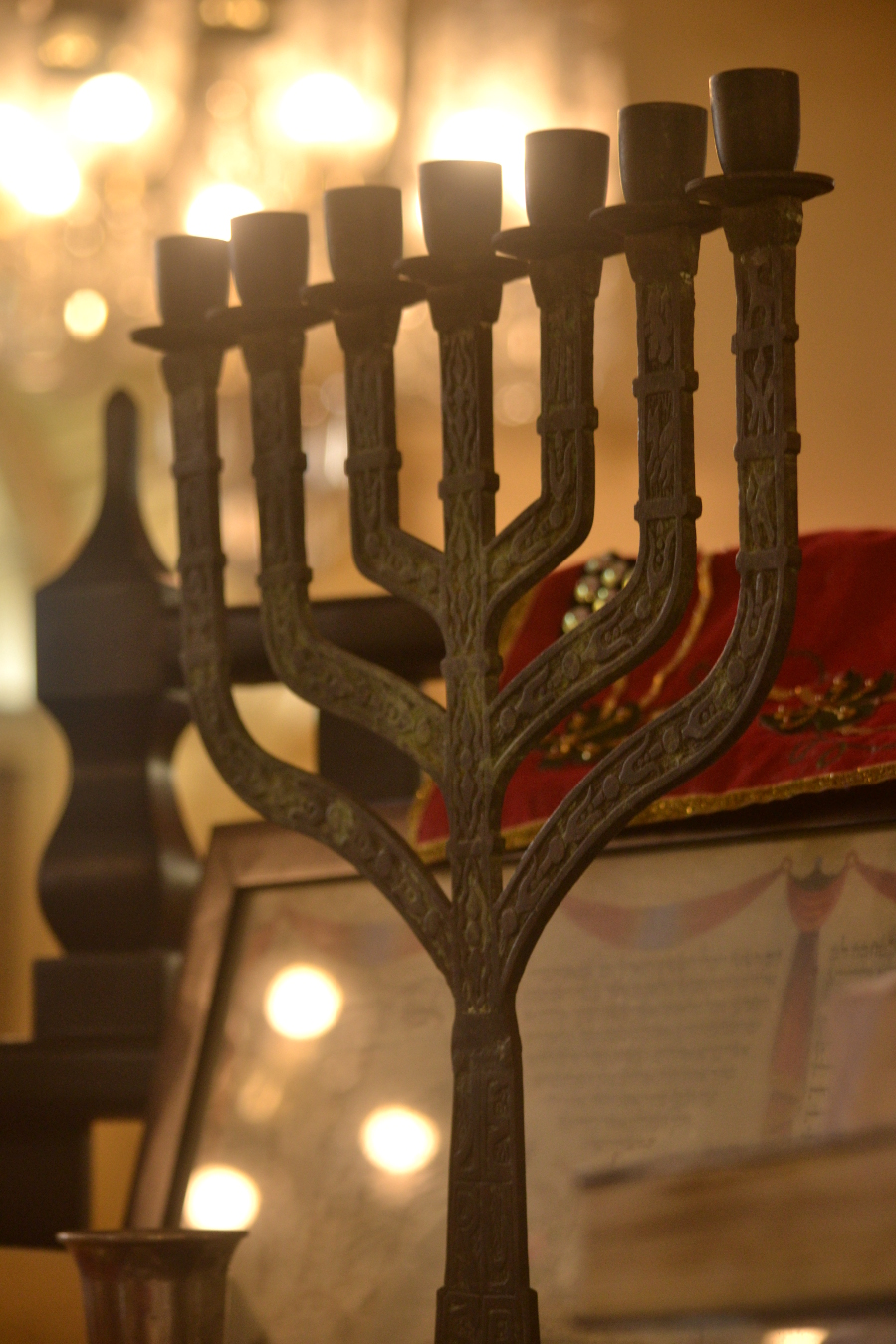
Menorah

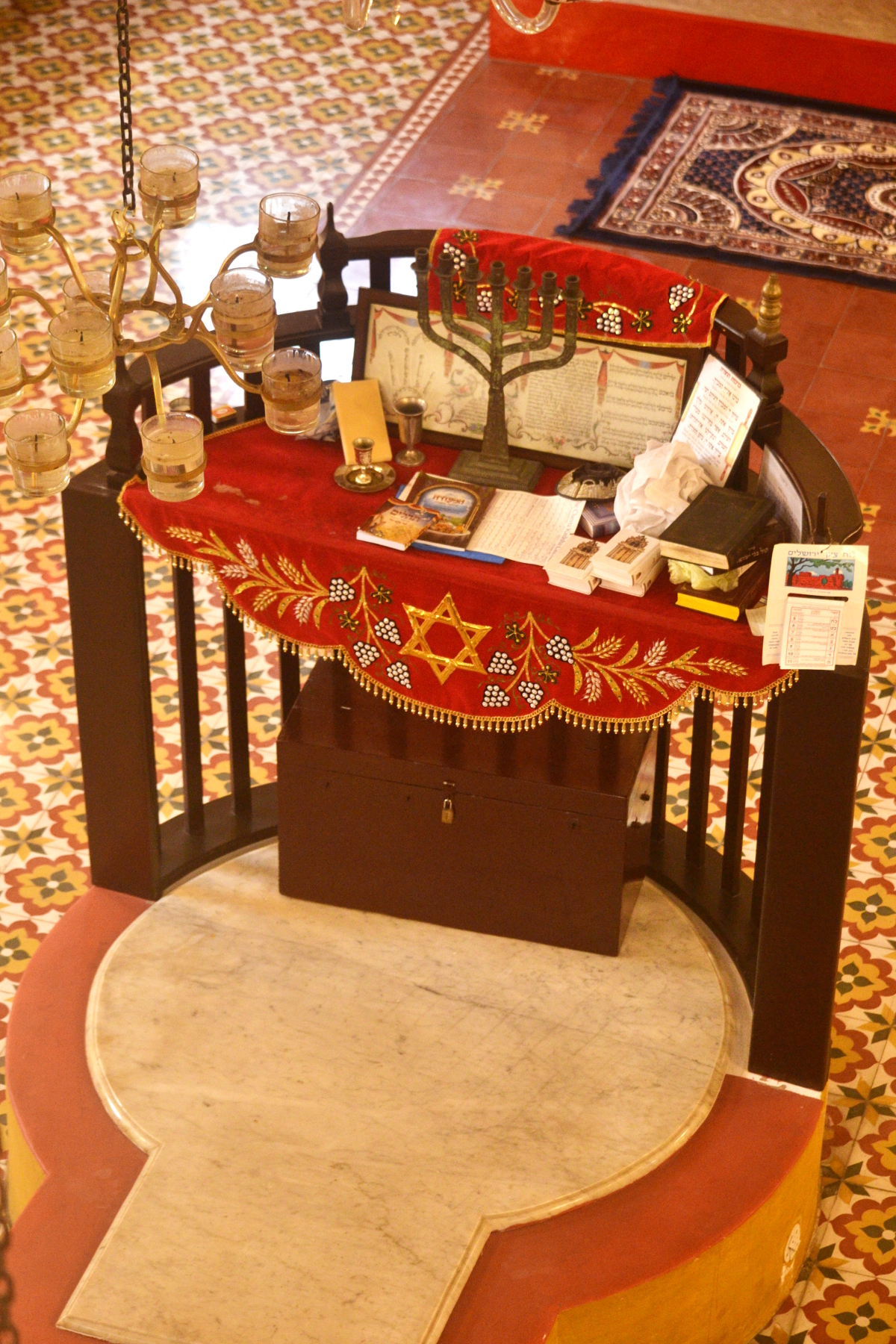
Bimah

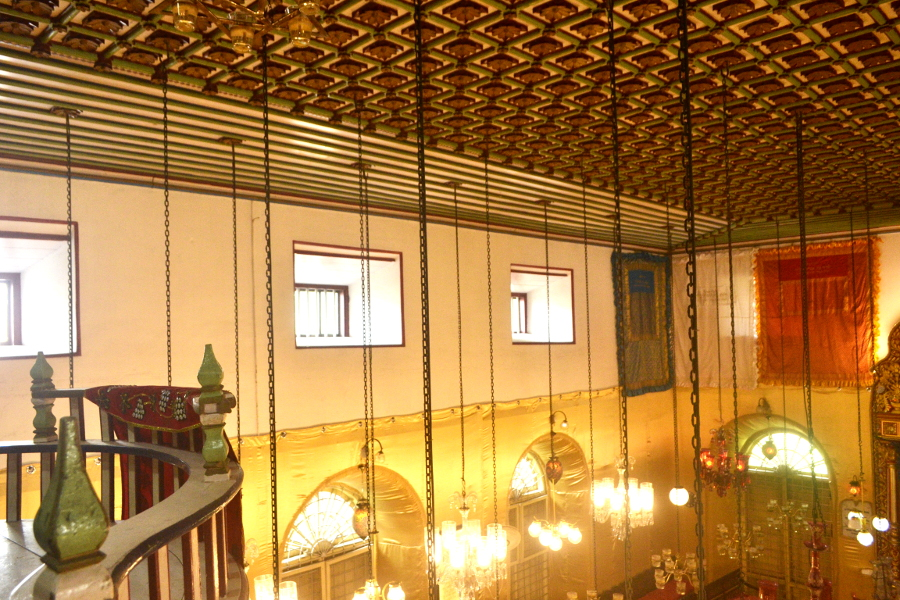
Synagogue interior viewed from the balcony

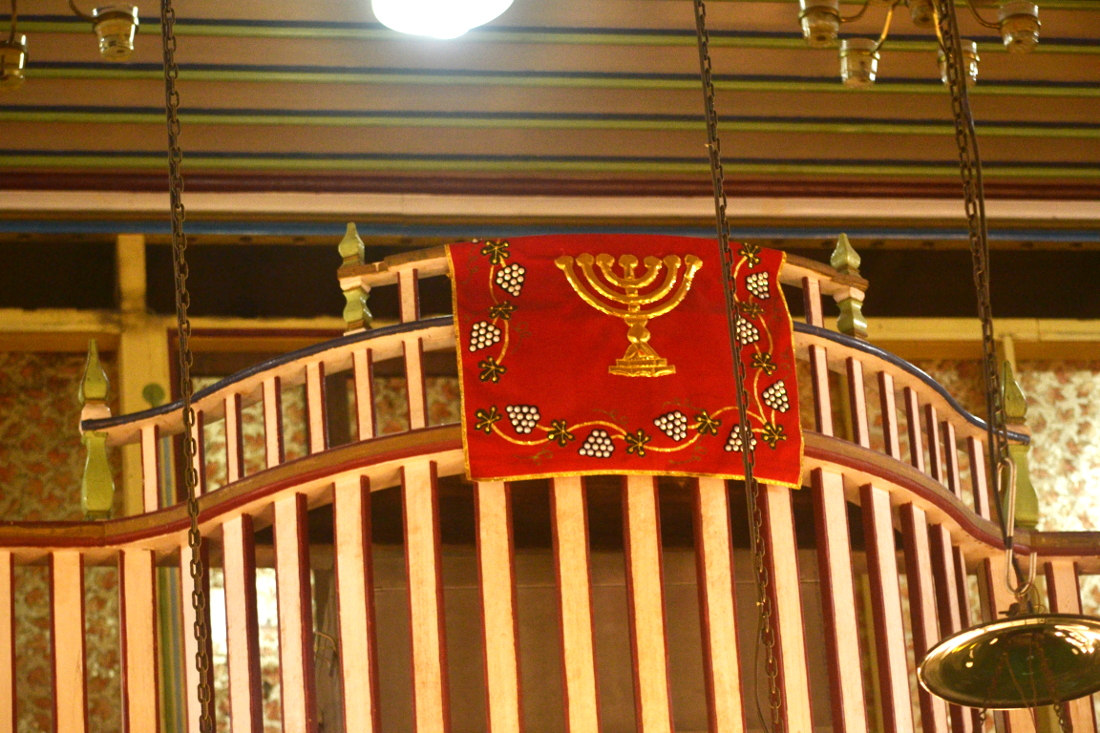
Women's balcony (mechitza)

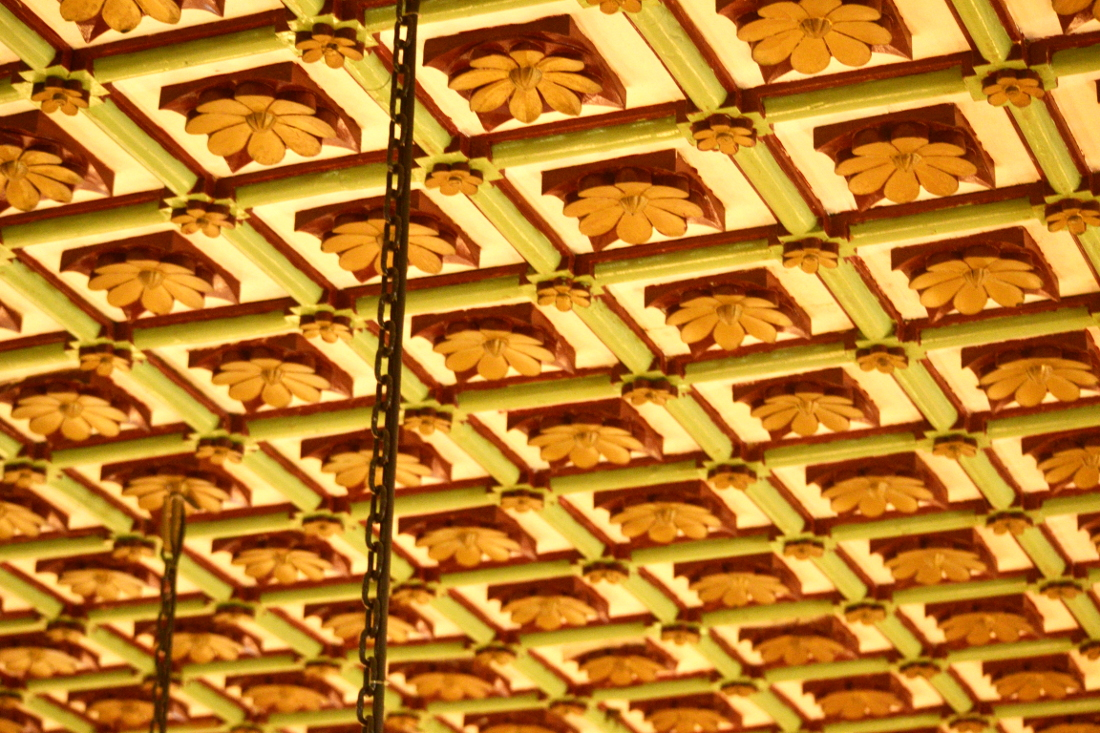
Synagogue ceiling with floral patterns

== See also ==
- History of the Jews in India
- List of synagogues in India
- List of synagogues in Kerala
