= Thekkumbhagam Synagogue =

Former synagogue in Kochi, Kerala, India

- Former location of the destroyed synagogue in Kerala

Religion
- Affiliation: Orthodox Judaism (former)
- Rite: Nusach Sefard
- Ecclesiastical or organizational status: Synagogue (1647–1960)
- Status: Demolished

Location
- Location: Mattancherry, Kerala
- Country: India
- Interactive map of Thekkumbhagam Synagogue
- Coordinates: 9°57′24″N 76°15′35″E

Architecture
- Type: Synagogue architecture
- Style: Cochin Jewish
- Completed: 1647
- Demolished: 1960
- Direction of façade: East

The Thekkumbhagam Synagogue, officially the Thekkumbhagam Mattancherry Synagogue, was a former Orthodox Jewish congregation and synagogue, that was located in Mattancherry Jew Town, a suburb of Kochi, Kerala, in South India. The building was demolished in 1960, and a hotel is located on the site.

== History ==
The synagogue was built by the Malabar Jews in 1647 on land donated by the Maharajah of Cochin. Prior to its destruction in 1960, the synagogue was one of the oldest known synagogues in India. It was the fourth to be built in Mattancherry after they fled to Cochin from Muziris.

The name of the synagogue is believed to refer to a much older synagogue that once stood in Kodungaloor. The Thekkumbhagam palli (synagogue) was built in typical Kerala-style Jewish architecture and was almost identical to the nearby Paradesi Synagogue though it had a much longer breezeway and a different design of gatehouse. A curious feature of the synagogue were four ostrich eggs that were hung for good luck.

In 1955, the entire congregation made aliyah to Israel leaving the synagogue in the care of the Paradesi community to be maintained. In the 1960s, the synagogue was torn down and a two-story residential house was constructed. The only remaining relic from this monument is the hekal that was brought and is currently preserved in The Magnes Museum in Berkeley, California, USA.

It changed hands again and now a heritage hotel is being constructed.

== See also ==
- History of the Jews in India
- List of synagogues in India
- List of synagogues in Kerala
