= Chendamangalam Synagogue =

Former synagogue, now museum, in Kerala, India

- Hebrew: בית הכנסת צ'נמנגלם; Malayalam: ചേന്ദമംഗലം ജൂതപള്ളി
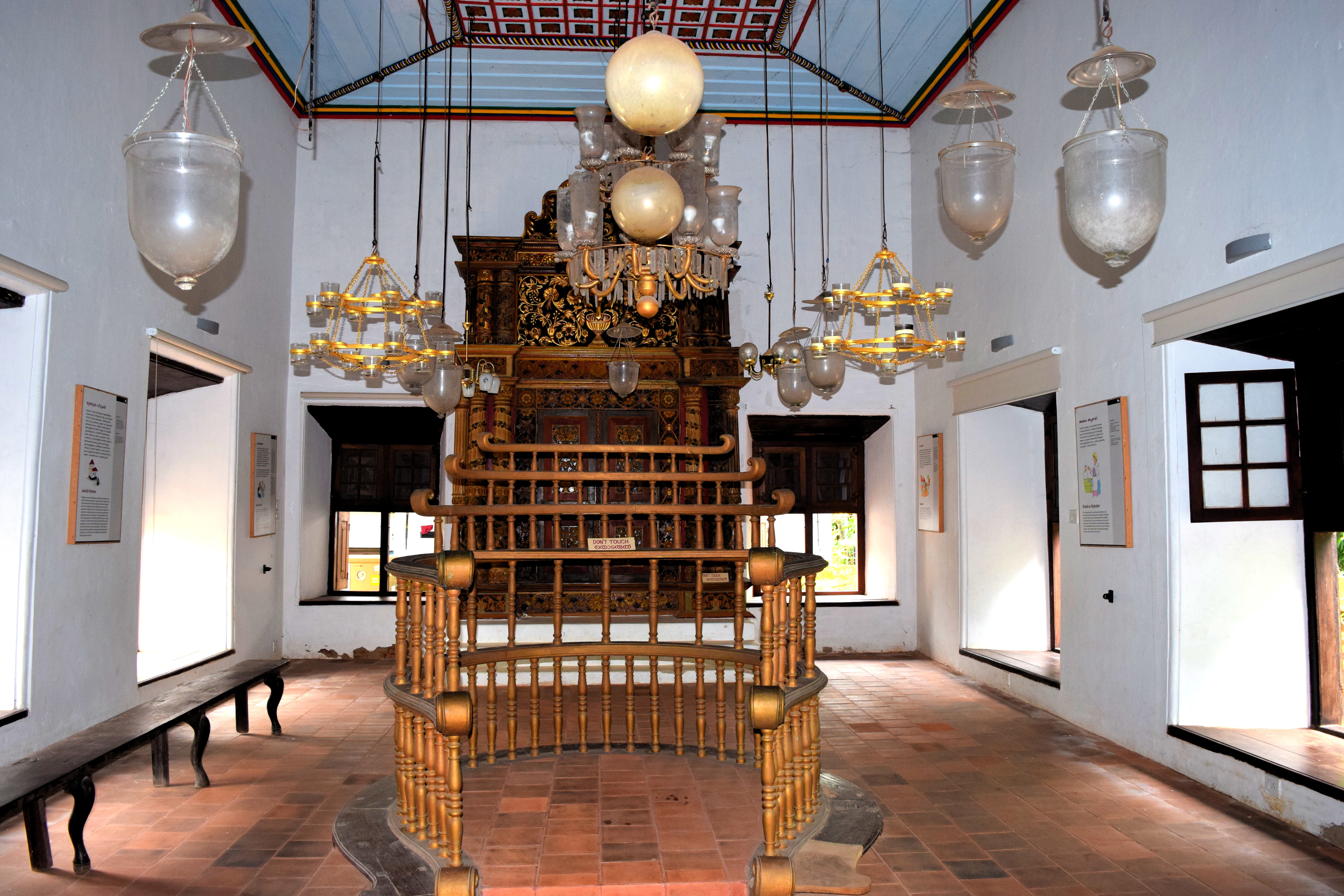
- The interior of the former synagogue, in 2016

- Location of the former synagogue, now museum, in Kerala

Religion
- Affiliation: Orthodox Judaism (former)
- Ecclesiastical or organizational status: Synagogue (1420–1950s); Jewish museum
- Status: Inactive (as a synagogue); Repurposed (as a museum)

Location
- Location: Chendamangalam, Kerala
- Country: India
- Interactive map of Chendamangalam Synagogue
- Coordinates: 10°10′47″N 76°12′35″E

Architecture
- Type: Synagogue architecture
- Style: Cochin Jewish; Portuguese colonial
- Established: 1100 CE
- Completed: 1420 CE (first structure); 1614 CE (major renovation)
- Direction of façade: South

The Chendamangalam Synagogue (Hebrew: בית הכנסת צ'נמנגלם; Malayalam: ചേന്ദമംഗലം ജൂതപള്ളി) is a former Orthodox Jewish congregation and synagogue, located in Chendamangalam, a village in the Ernakulam district of the coastal state of Kerala, in India. Completed in 1420 CE, the building was abandoned in the 1950s, and was subsequently repurposed as a Jewish museum.

== History ==
Established in 1100 CE, the congregation is one of the oldest known Jewish communities established by the Malabar Jews, though the synagogue structure itself dates from 1420, and was renovated in 1614, making it the oldest synagogue in the Commonwealth of Nations. A tombstone recovered from Kodungallur was stored in this synagogue and is on display in the front yard, with an inscription of Sarah Bat Israel, dating from 1269, making it the second oldest Jewish epitaph found in India.

After the entire congregation made aliyah to Israel in the 1950s, the former synagogue was defunct for decades. Today it serves as the Kerala Jews Lifestyle Museum for the Muziris Project, a conservation project by the Government of Kerala. The former synagogue is open to visitors from 9:30 am to 5:00 pm on weekdays.

The hillocks at Kottayil Kovilakam are unique as the site of a Hindu temple, a Syrian Christian church, a mosque and a restored Jewish synagogue, all within 1 km (0.62 mi) of each other. In the area, there are also remains of the Vypeenakotta Seminary, built by the Portuguese for Syrians in the 16th century. An old Syrian Catholic Church built in 1201 is nearby and it is also the site of the first printing press in India.

== Objects of interest ==
=== Tombstone of Sarah bat Israel ===
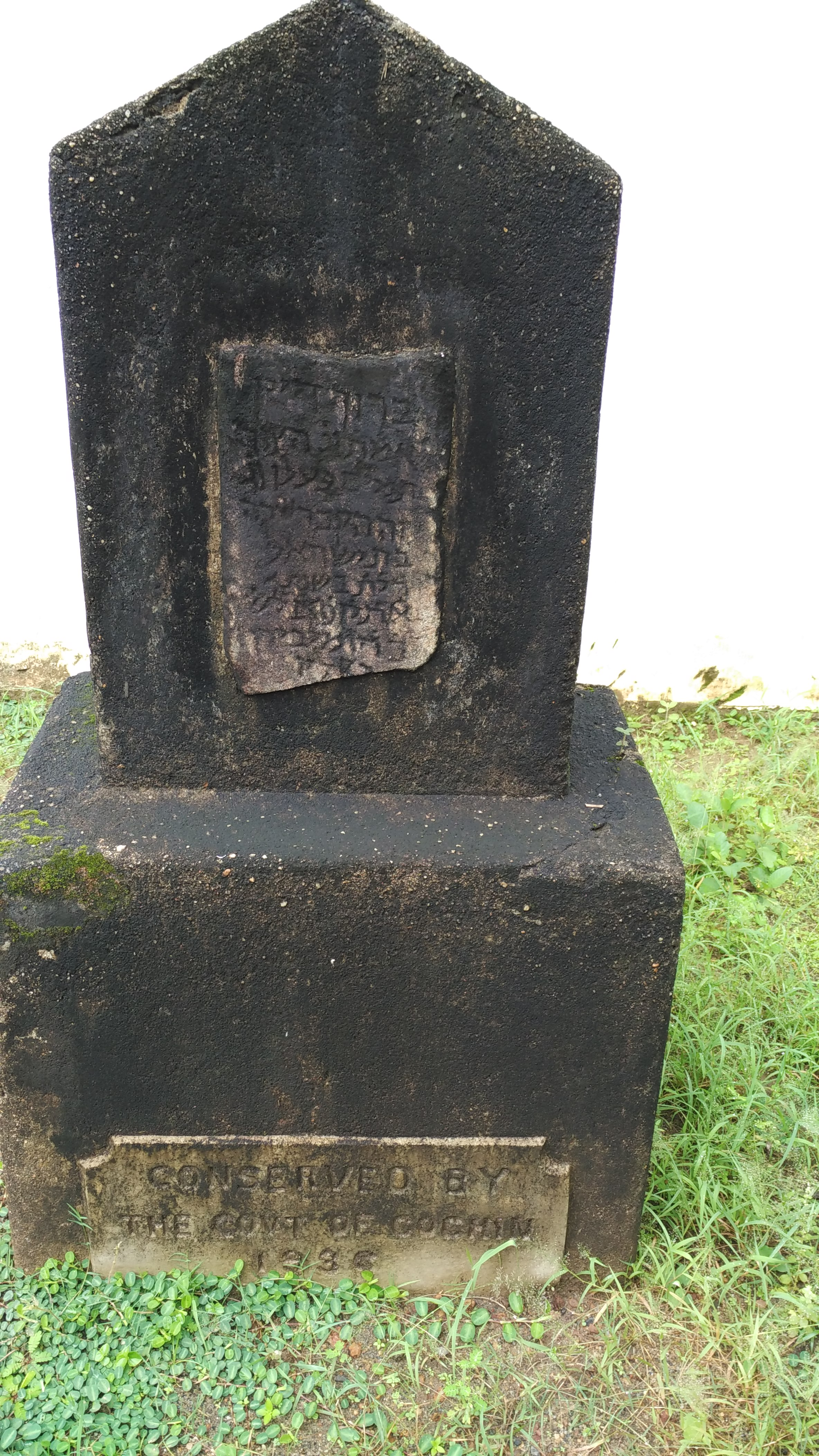
Tombstone of Sarah bat Israel

A tombstone recovered from Kodungallur was stored in this synagogue and is presently on display in the front yard. This tombstone with the inscription of "Sarah bat Israel" is the oldest Jewish epitaph found in India, dating to November 1269 (Kislev 1581 Seleucid era).

=== Hekkal ===
The Heichal of the former Chendamangalam Synagogue is one of the most ornately carved Torah arks in Kerala. The style of the ark is Italian with gilded filigree work. It bears the crown insignia of the tribe of Judah.

=== Golden Sefer Torah Crown ===
The Golden Sefer Torah Crown was gifted by the Maharaja of Travancore to the Chendamangalam Jews. The crown weighed 212 carats (42.4 g) and was made of solid gold, studded with rubies and emeralds. A rimon from the Palayoor Synagogue was brought and stored in this synagogue. This was later purchased by the Paravur Synagogue, which in turn sold it to the Kadavumbhagam Synagogue in Ernakulam. The crown was later taken to Israel and stored in moshav Nevatim. In 2008, thieves broke into the moshav and stole the crown. The whereabouts of the crown are unknown.

== Chendamangalam Jewish Cemetery ==
There is also an abandoned Jewish cemetery behind the mosque, approximately 400 m (1,300 ft) from the synagogue, which has not been restored.

== Gallery ==
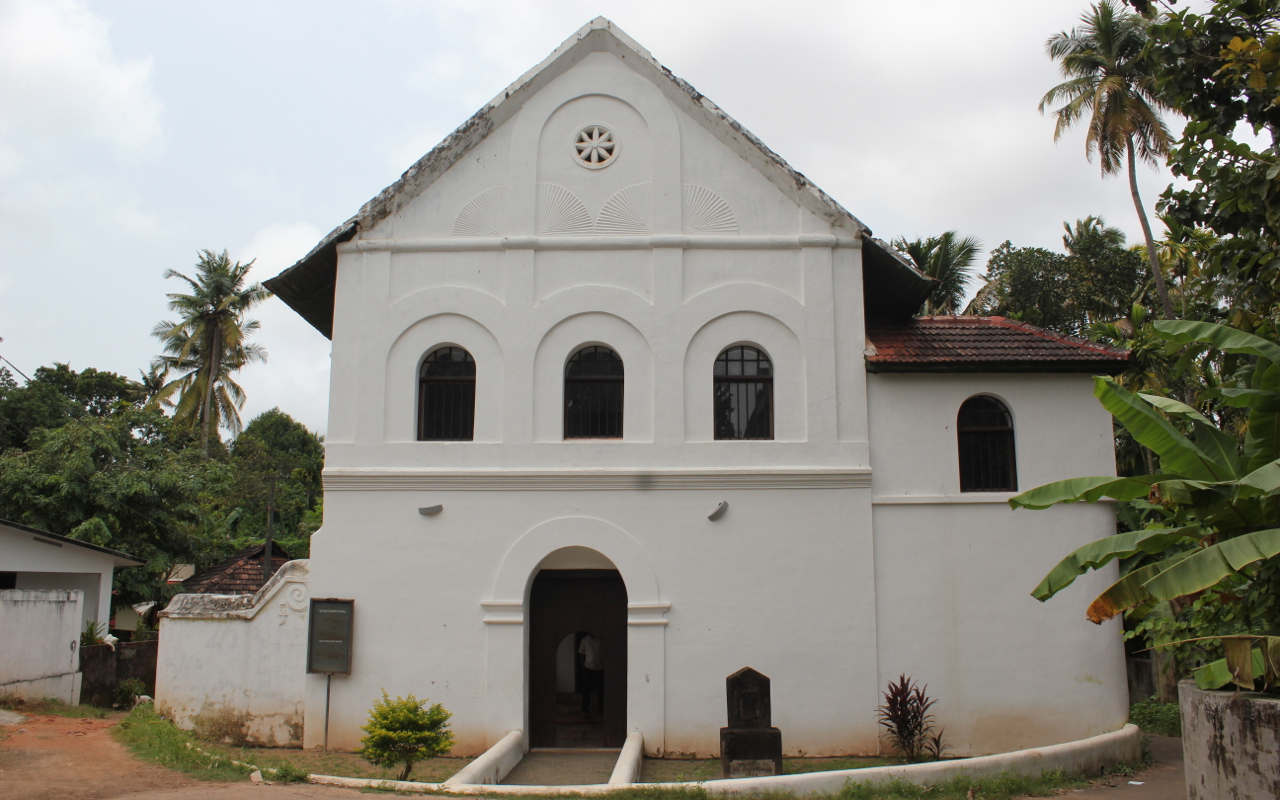

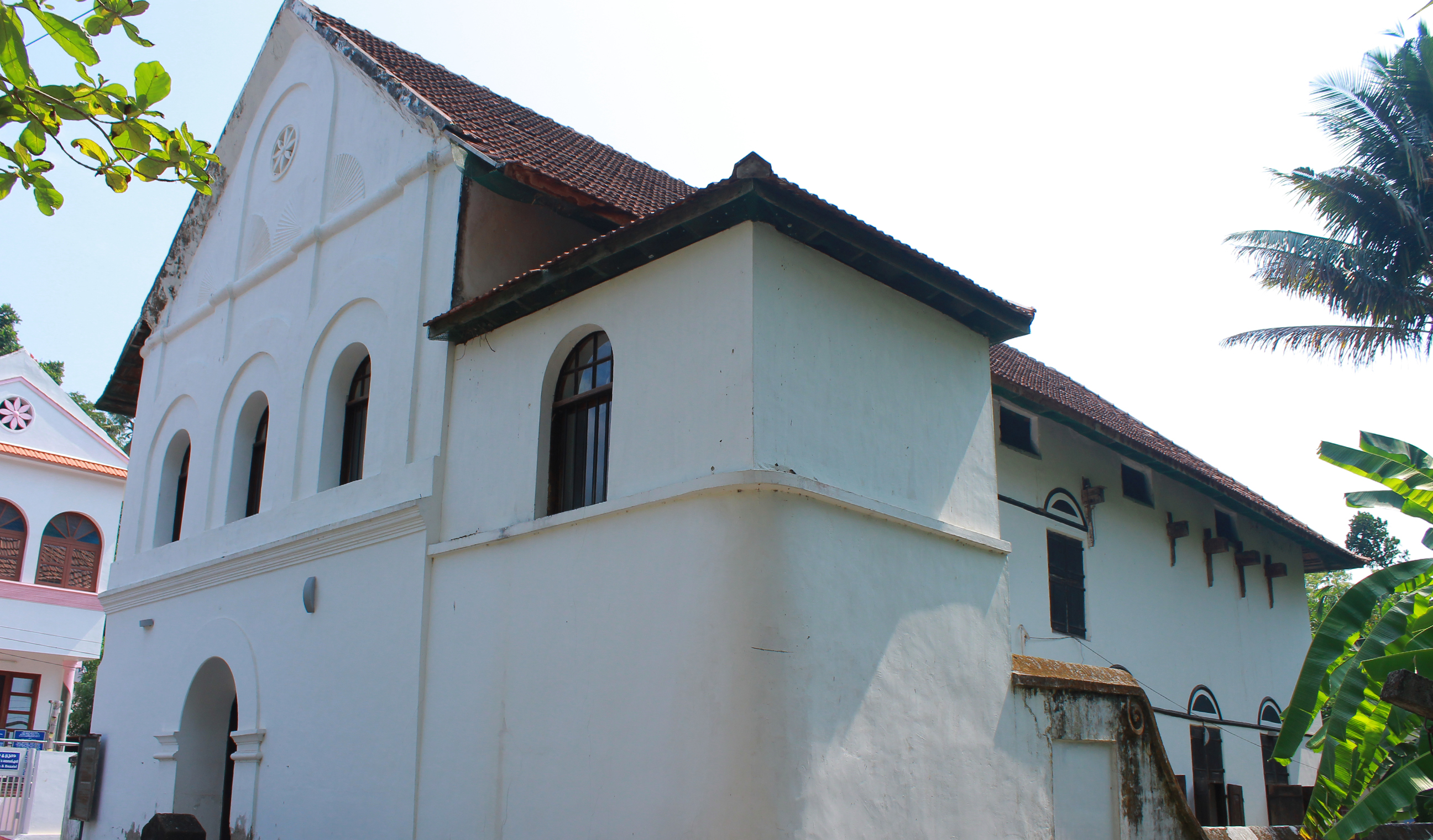

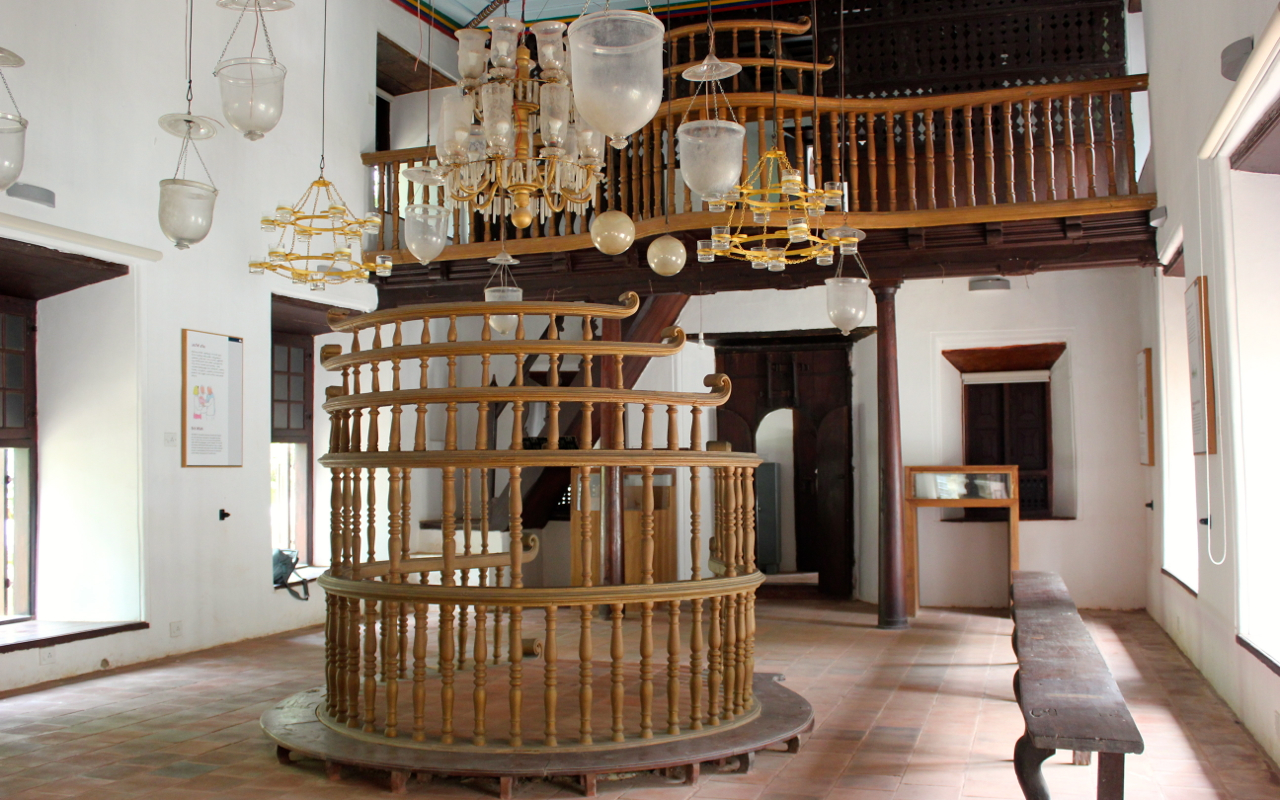

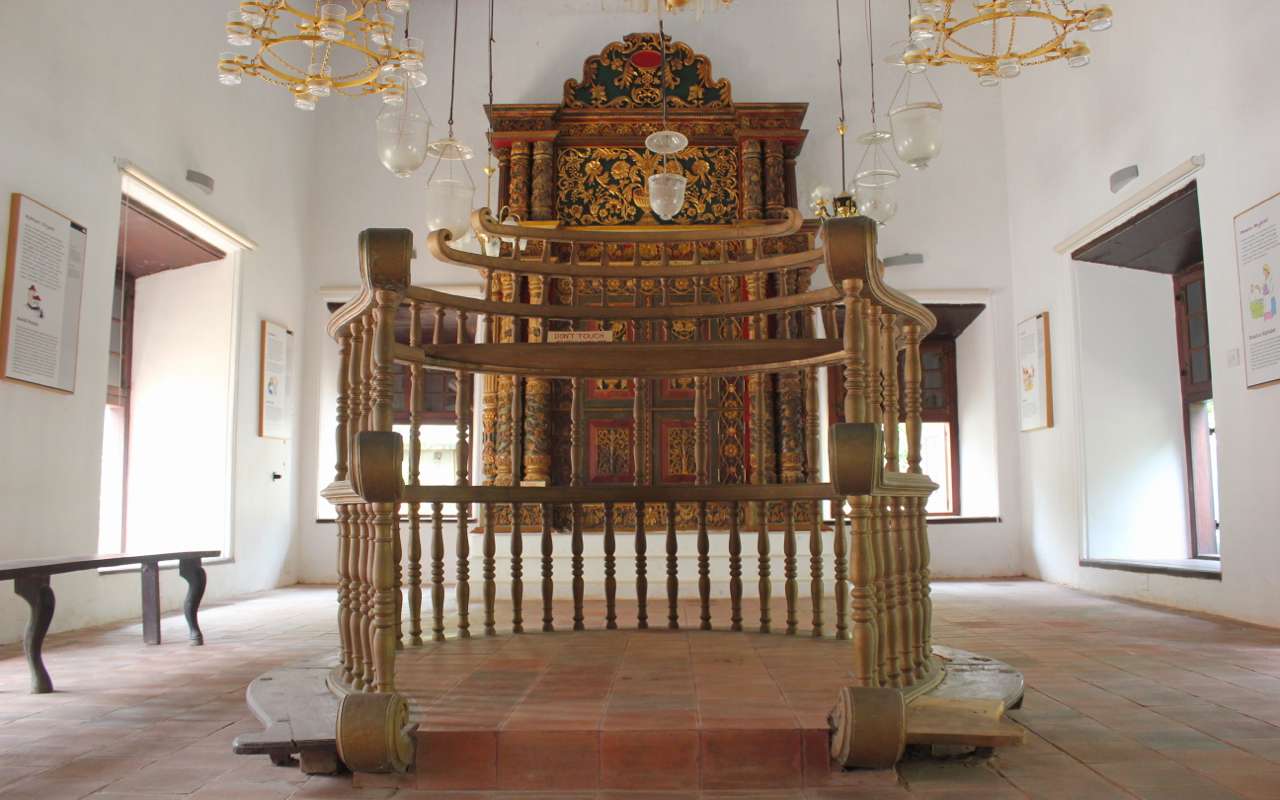

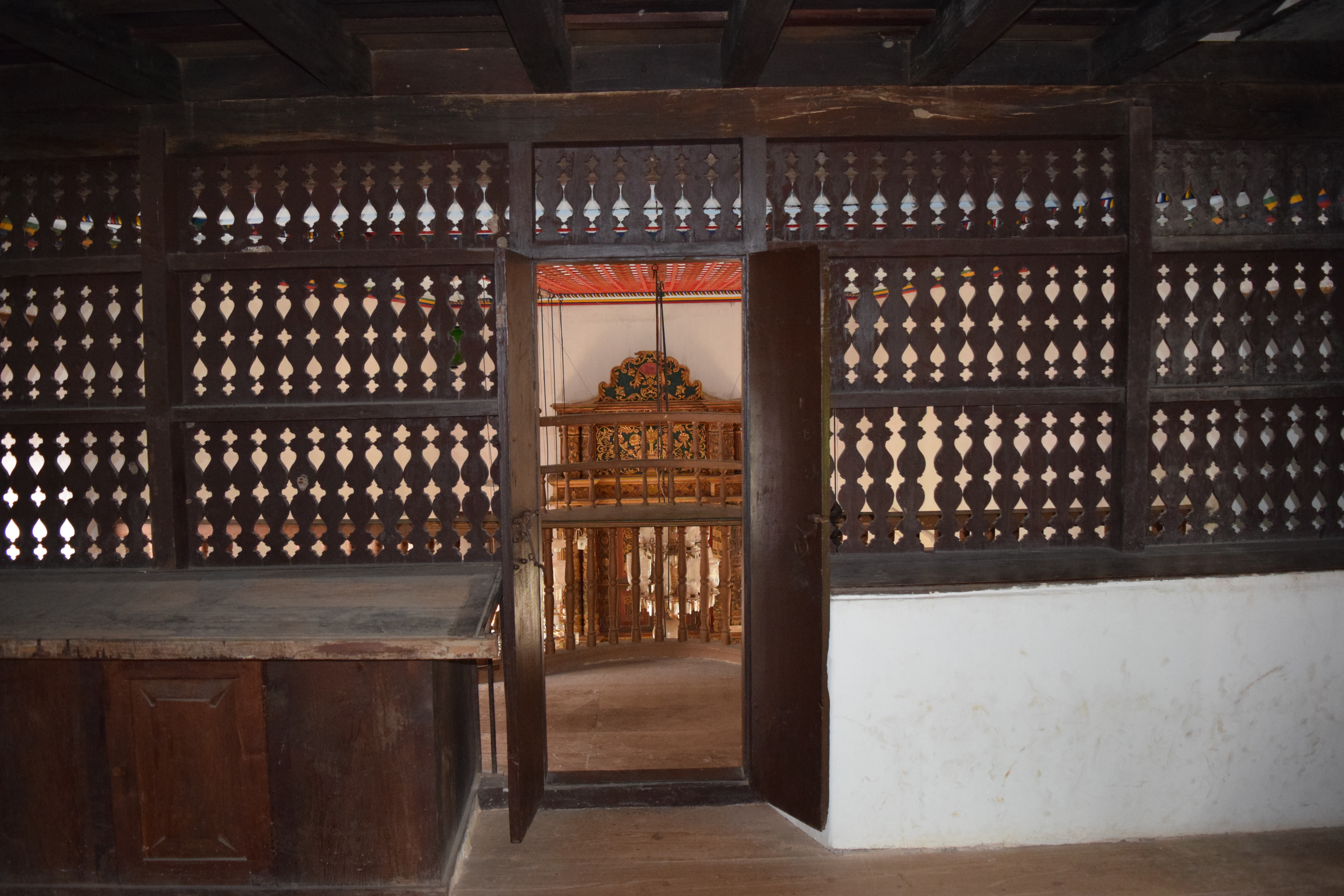

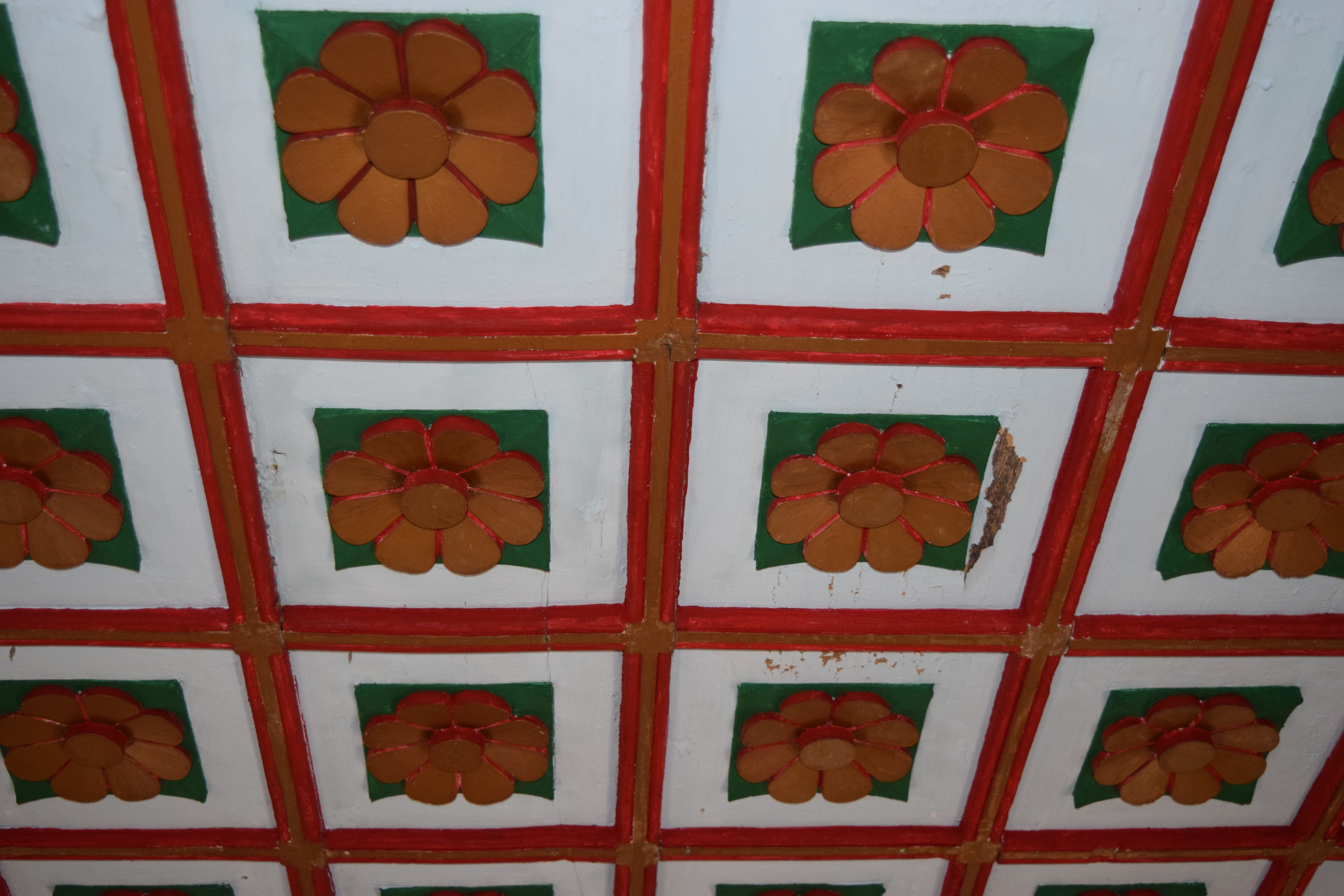

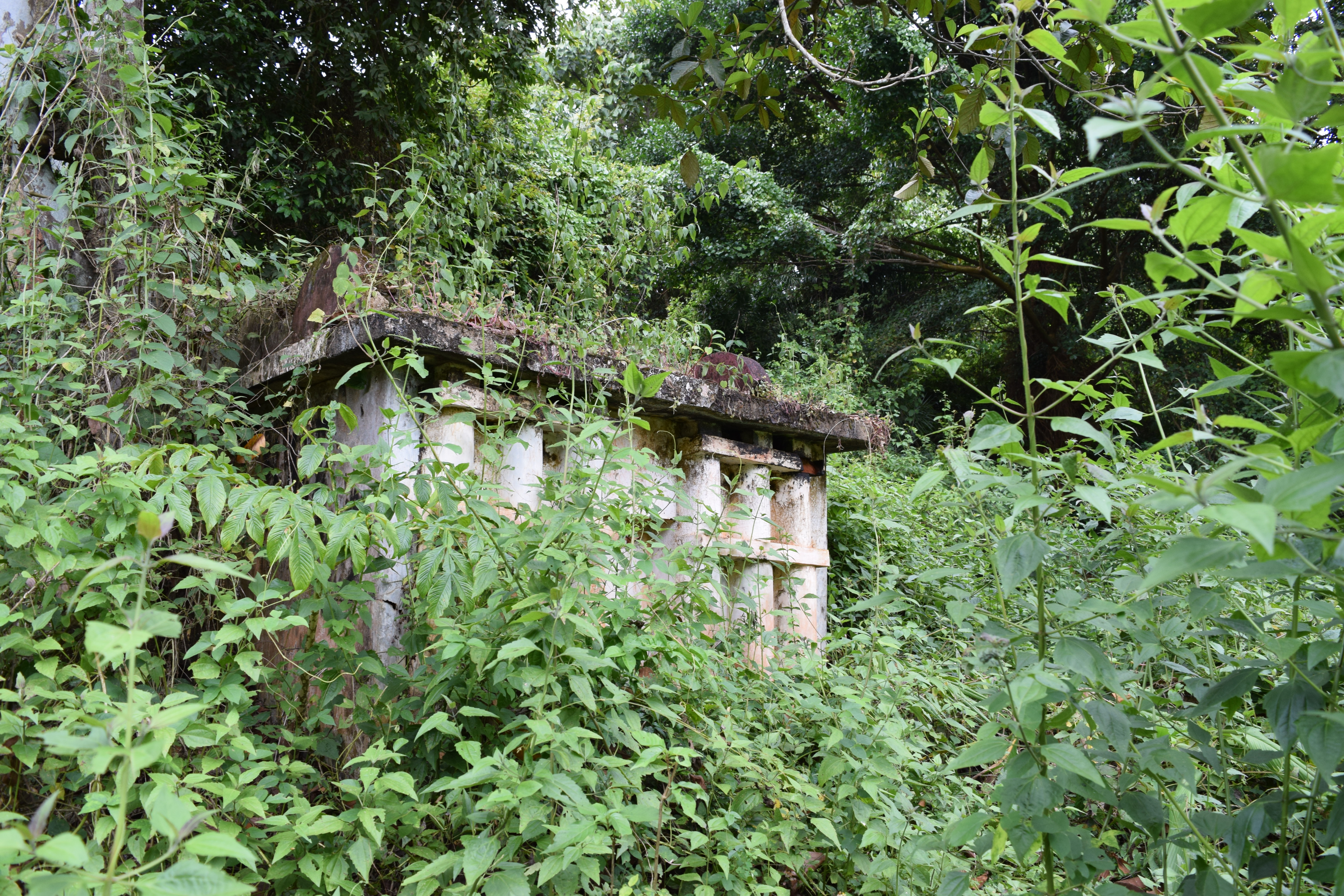

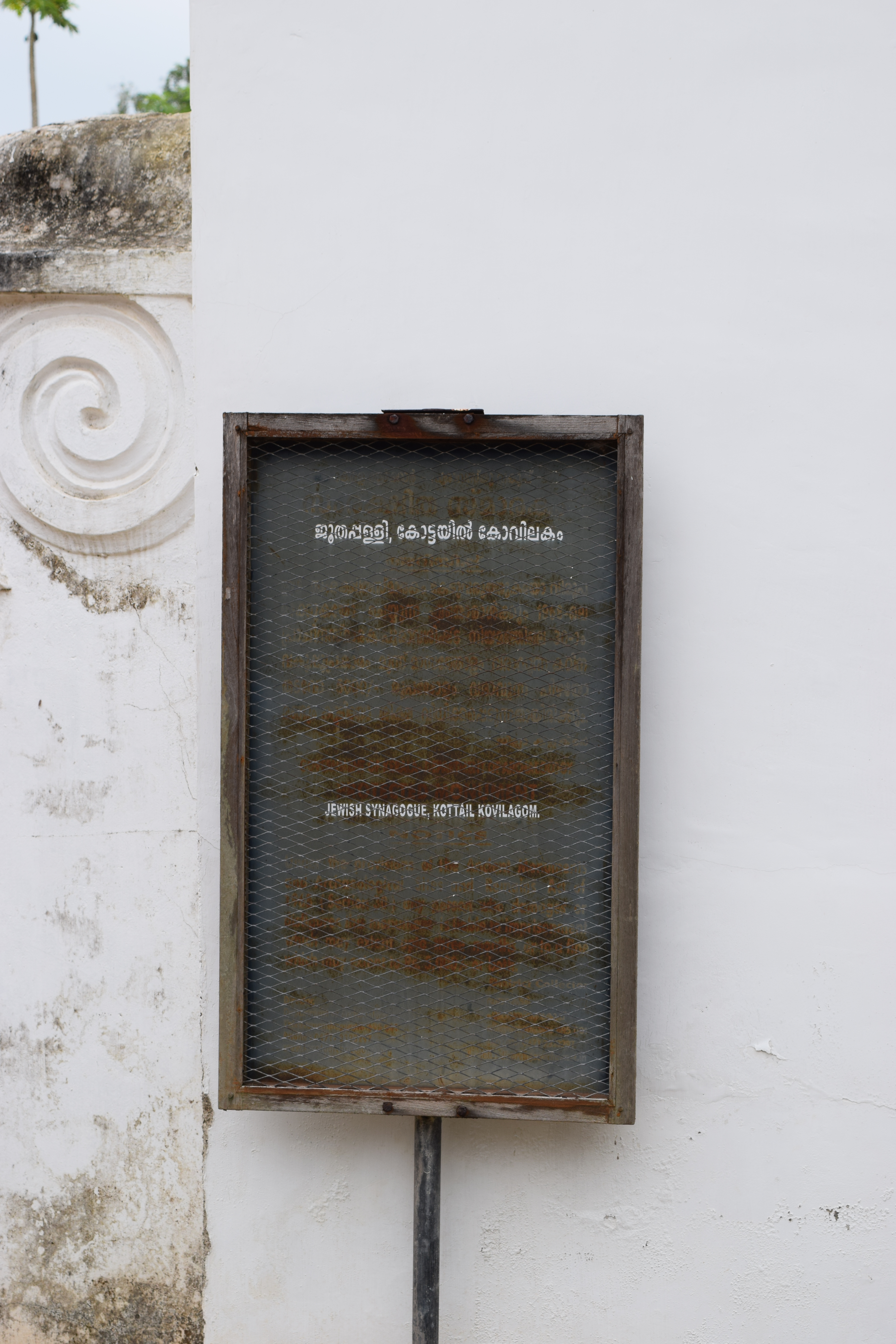

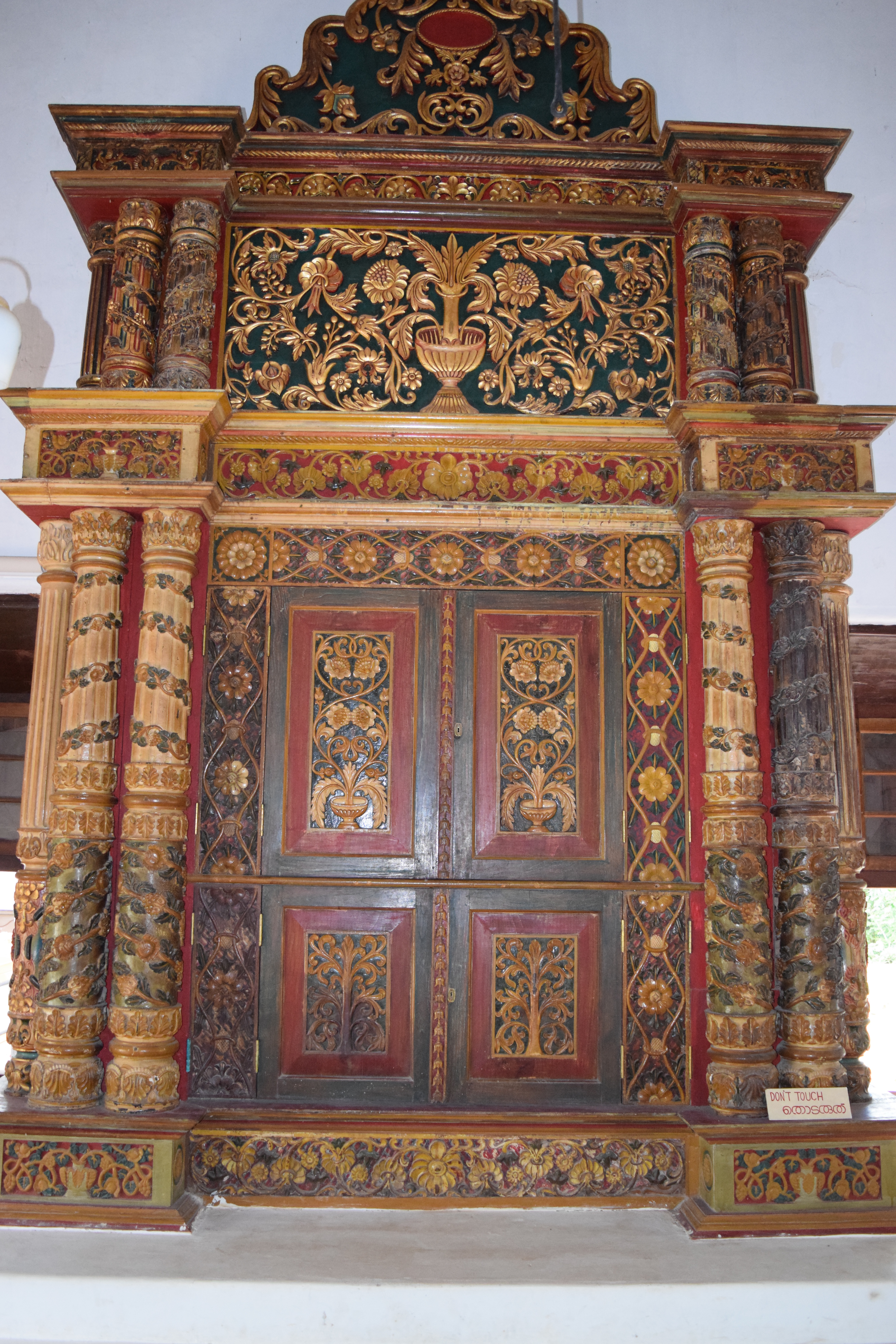

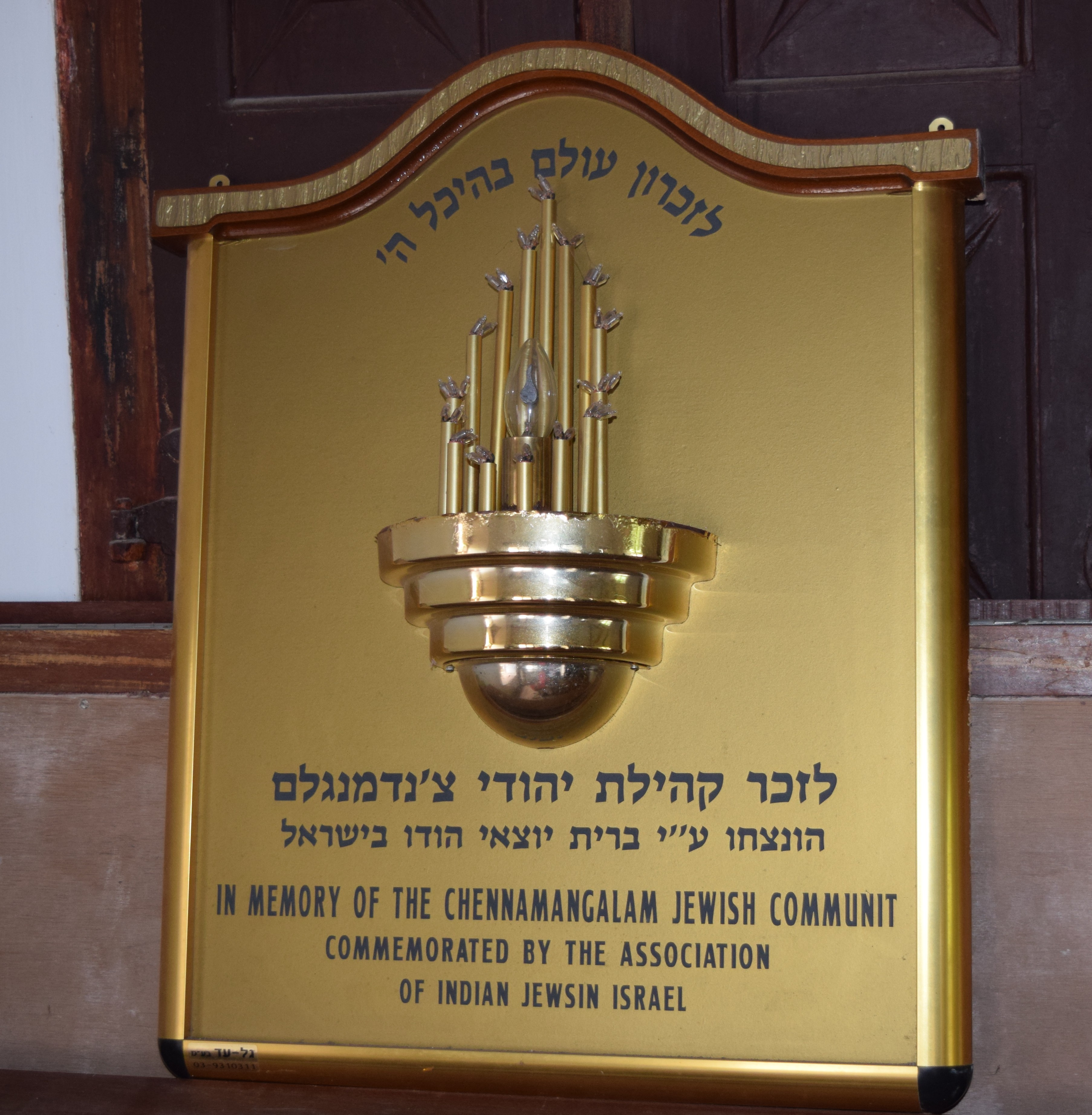

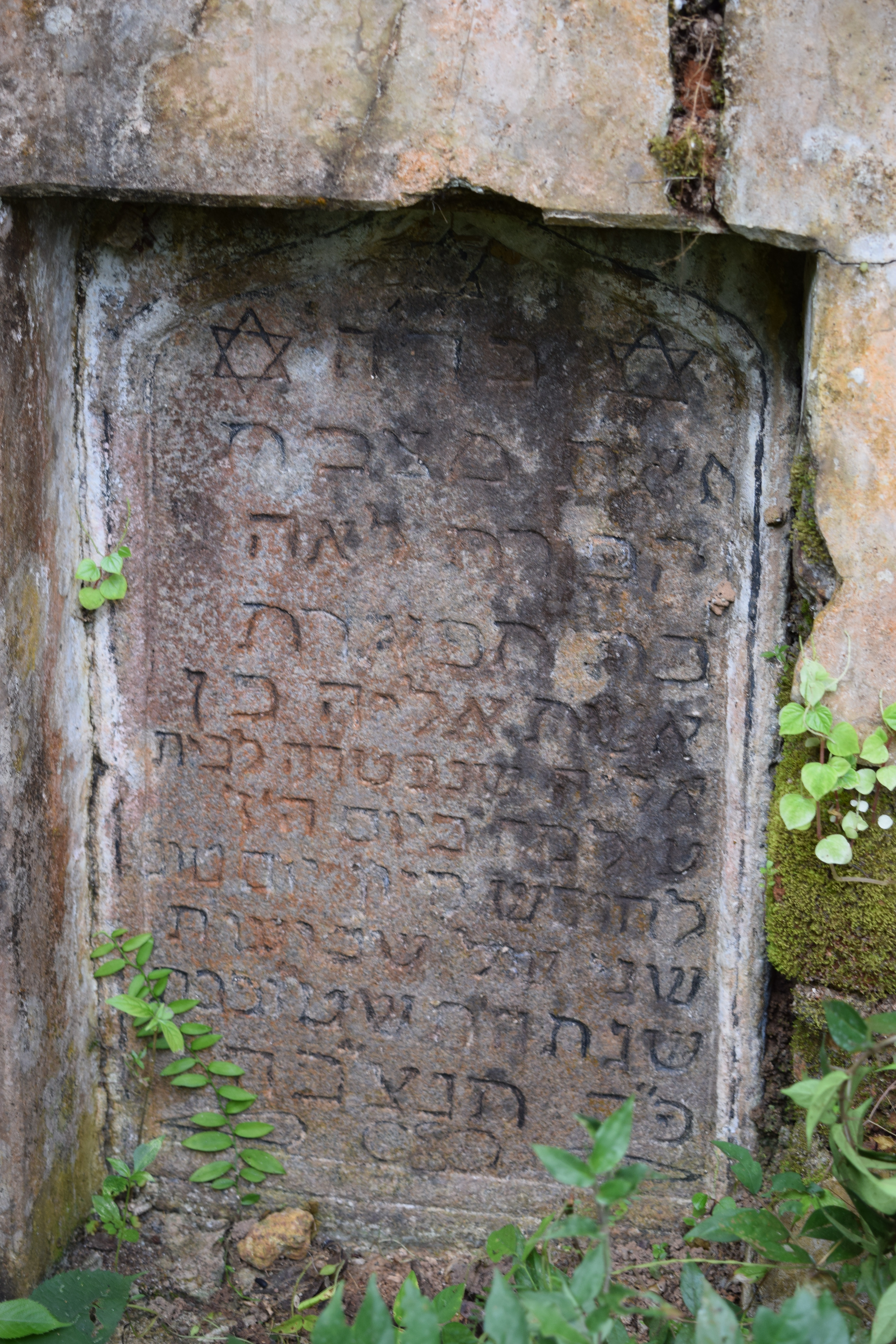

== See also ==
- History of the Jews in India
- List of synagogues in India
- List of synagogues in Kerala
