= List of synagogues in Kerala =

There are at least eight known synagogues in Kerala in recorded history, even though most of them are not operating anymore. Seven of the synagogues are used by the Cochin Jews, with one used by the Paradesi Jews. Each of these is quite unique in its construction and architecture; nevertheless, they retain very similar aesthetics, blending in both the Jewish and Keralite traditions rarified over centuries. A synagogue was called "Beit Knesset" (Malayalam: ബേത് ക്‌നേസേത്; Hebrew: בית כנסת) in Judeo-Malayalam or "Jootha Palli" (Malayalam: ജൂതപള്ളി) with joothan meaning Jew in Malayalam and -palli a suffix added to prayer houses of the Abrahamic faiths.

Only the Paradesi Synagogue in Mattancherry and the Kadavumbhagam Ernakulam Synagogue in Ernakulam downtown still functions as a synagogue and are popular tourist destinations. The Parur Synagogue, Chendamangalam Synagogue, Mala Synagogue are open to public visit, even if they do not serve their originally intended religious purposes anymore. They remain as souvenirs representative of Kerala's rich cosmopolitan heritage, religious tolerance, and cultural magnificence.

Many old synagogues are completely lost, a notable example being the Kochangadi Synagogue built in 1344 (the foundation stone of which is still retained in the Paradesi Synagogue), mostly likely after the Jews had to abandon Muziris due to the great flood of the Periyar river in 1341.

== List of synagogues ==
Name	Location	Image	Current state
Paradesi Synagogue	Mattancherry, Kochi		Operational
Mala Synagogue	Mala, Thrissur		Non-operational for worship, open to visits
Chendamangalam Synagogue	Chendamangalam, North Paravur		Non-operational for worship; Open to public visits as Kerala Jews Life Style Museum.
Paravur Synagogue	North Paravur (Parur)		Non-operational for worship; Open to public visits as Kerala Jews History Museum
Kadavumbhagam Ernakulam Synagogue	Market Road, Ernakulam; At the center of the crowded market area on west side of Market Road, just south of where it intersects with Jew Street		Operational; The synagogue was functional until 1972, when its membership could no longer support it); currently hosts a business "Cochin Blossoms" by the present owner Mr. Elias (Babu) Josephai; it is undergoing restoration as of 2018; open to visits. The synagogue was restored and restarted operations in 2025.
Thekkumbhagam Ernakulam Synagogue	Jew Street, Ernakulam, Kochi On the north side of Jew Street, between Market Road and Broadway and to the west of the Juma Masjid, a landmark mosque.		Non-operational for worship; It has served as a gathering hall for community events in recent years. Currently, it is a locked property; access has to be prearranged with the present owner "Association of Kerala Jews", who can be contacted through Mr. Elias (Babu) Josephai, the caretaker of the nearby Kadavumbhagam Ernakulam Synagogue.
Kadavumbhagam Mattancherry Synagogue	Mattancherry, Kochi	Interiors of Kadavumbhagam Mattancherry Synagogue displayed in Israel Museum, Jerusalem	Non-operational for worship; in ruins; served as coir storage facility; Heckal (Holy Torah Ark) was moved to Israel and remains at the Synagogue in moshav Nehalim; interior moved to Israel, restored and displayed in Israel Museum at Jerusalem
Thekkumbhagam Mattancherry Synagogue	Mattancherry, Kochi		Non-operational and not existing anymore; Bought by a Paradesi Jew after the congregation left to Israel in 1955, it was later demolished to build a 2-storeyed house at the same site. Through the efforts of anthropologist Professor David G. Mandelbaum and Seymour Fromer of the former Judah L. Magnes Museum, many relics from this synagogue have been preserved at the Magnes Collection of Jewish Art and Life at the University of California, Berkeley and the most important antiquity being the restored Torah Ark (Heckal).

== List of destroyed synagogues ==
Throughout their history numerous synagogues have been constructed and lost to time. in their first settlement at Shingly (Cranganore), there were 18 synagogues as per their oral traditions. Today no archaeological evidence has been yet uncovered to validate these traditions. However the custom of naming their synagogues as "Thekkumbhagam" (lit: south side) and "Kadavumbhagam" (lit: River side) is cited as a cultural memory of two such synagogues that once stood in Muziris. Several oral songs sung by Cochini women also contain references to these synagogues. Apart from these, numerous Syrian Christian churches of the St. Thomas Christian community in Kerala claim to have been built on old synagogues, though archaeological evidence is scarce.

Synagogues believed to have existed or speculated on basis of oral traditions include:

- Madayi Synagogue, Madayi
- Kodungaloor Synagogue/ Makotai Synagogue, Kodungallur
- Thekkumbhagam synagogue, Kodungallur
- Kadavumbhagam Synagogue, Kodungallur

Synagogues in recorded history whose location and/or remains have been lost in time:

- Palayoor Synagogue, Palur (known only from a rimon (ornament) bearing its name)
- Kokkamangalam Synagogue, Kokkamangalam
- Kochangadi Synagogue, (1344–1789 AD) Kochangadi (oldest synagogue in recorded history)
- Saudi Synagogue, (1514–1556 AD), Saude, a locality south of Fort Kochi.
- Tir-Tur Synagogue, (1745–1768 AD) Thiruthur, Kochi
- Muttam Synagogue (1800 AD), Muttam, Alappuzha
- Fort Kochi Synagogue, (1848 AD), Fort Kochi (congregation of meschuhrarim)

== Architectural similarities ==
All the eight synagogues in Kerala built during the recent centuries have similar traditional architectural features that include:

- a central Bimah of brass or silver metal on a concrete or stone base
- an Ark or heckal on the western wall facing Jerusalem.
- a balcony above the eastern entry to the sanctuary that is used by the hazzan (reader) on certain holidays.
- a second bimah on the upper gallery for women, unique to Kerala synagogues. Often integrated into the wooden railing of the balcony.
- a women's gallery behind the balcony, with a stairway leading up to it, usually from outside the building.

== See also ==
- History of the Jews in India
- Jewish Architectural Heritage Foundation
- Kerala architecture
- Synagogue architecture
- Synagogues in India
