= List of synagogues in India =

This is list of synagogues in India, organised by state.

== Gujarat ==
- Magen Abraham Synagogue

== Kerala ==
- Chendamangalam Synagogue
- Karl Damschen
- Kadavumbhagam Ernakulam Synagogue
- Kadavumbhagam Mattancherry Synagogue
- Kochangadi Synagogue
- Madras Synagogue
- Mala Synagogue
- Paradesi Synagogue
- Paravur Synagogue
- Thekkumbhagam Mattancherry Synagogue
- Thekkumbhagam Ernakulam Synagogue

== Maharashtra ==
- Magen Aboth Synagogue
- Nariman House
- Ohel David Synagogue

=== Mumbai ===
- Beth El Synagogue
- Gate of Mercy Synagogue
- Knesset Eliyahoo Synagogue
- Magen David Synagogue (Byculla)
- Magen Hasidim Synagogue
- Shaar Hashamaim Synagogue
- Share Rason Synagogue
- Tephereth Israel Synagogue

== West Bengal ==
- Beth El Synagogue (Kolkata)
- Magen David Synagogue (Kolkata)

== See also ==
- History of the Jews in India
- Lists of synagogues in India
- Synagogues in India
