= Mala Synagogue =

Former synagogue in Mala, Kerala, India

- Malayalam: മാള ജൂതപ്പള്ളി
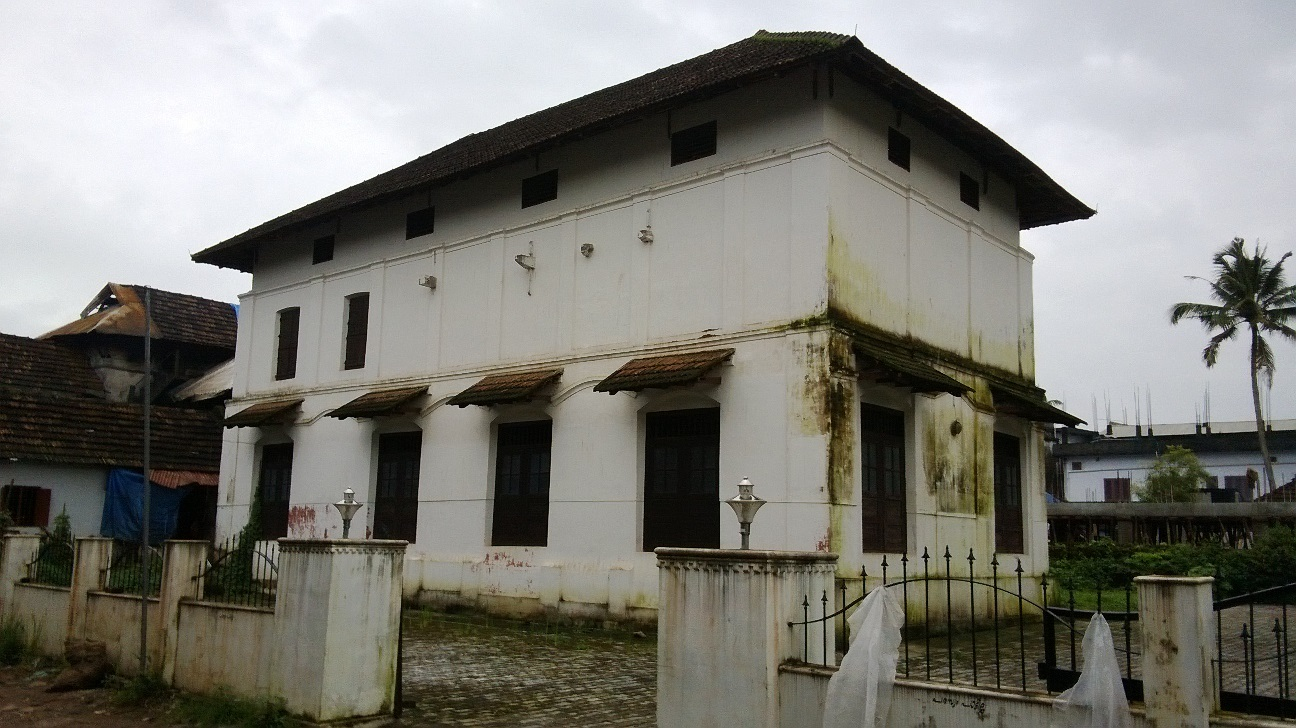
- The former synagogue in 2013

- Former location of the former synagogue in Kerala

Religion
- Affiliation: Judaism (former)
- Ecclesiastical or organisational status: Synagogue (1930–1954); Jewish museum
- Status: Abandoned (as a synagogue); Repurposed (as a museum)

Location
- Location: Mala, Kerala
- Country: India
- Coordinates: 10°10′47″N 76°12′35″E

Architecture
- Type: Synagogue architecture
- Style: Cochin Jewish architecture
- Established: c. 11th century (as a congregation)
- Completed: 1930
- Direction of façade: South

The Mala Synagogue (Malayalam: മാള ജൂതപ്പള്ളി) is a former synagogue, that is located in Mala, a small town in Thrissur district of the state of Kerala, India. The historic Malabar Jews arrived in Kerala in the 11th century. They built this synagogue in 1930, and it was abandoned by the congregation in the 1950s.

During 1954–1955 the Malabar Jewish congregation abandoned the synagogue and made aliyah to Israel. The congregation handed over both the Mala Synagogue and the associated Jewish cemetery to the Mala Panchayat for safekeeping. The former synagogue is defunct and does not have any religious material inside. The former synagogue now forms part of the Kerala Jews Lifestyle Museum, a Jewish museum.

== History ==
The Mala Synagogue is a heritage monument of the Malabar Jews and a standing example of the syncretic religious history of Kerala together with the several other synagogues in Kerala that are still existing around Paravur and Kochi. A hypothesis even proposes that the town's name Mala may have originated from the Hebrew word "Mal-Aha", which means "Center of Refugee".

=== Establishment of synagogue ===
There are different opinions made by historians about the origin of the Mala Synagogue.

According to Prem Doss Swami Doss Yehudi, a Dravidian Judaist and historian, an ancient Jewish Malayalam folk song mentions that the synagogue was built in the 11th century using the wood donated to Joseph Rabban in 1000 CE by the king of the erstwhile Kodungallur Kingdom. The first structure was dismantled during the 14th century for unknown reasons (presumably after the Great Periyar Flood of 1341 but not necessarily due to the floods) and a new building was constructed in 1400.

This reconstructed 14th-century synagogue was renovated almost four centuries later, in 1792, most likely to repair the damages suffered during the Mysorean invasion of Kerala by Tipu Sultan during the Second Anglo-Mysore War of the early 1780s. However, Rev. Thomas Dawson, a CMS missionary stationed in Kochi during 1817, had a different opinion. During his site visits, he found that even though almost three decades had passed since Tipu Sultan's surrender of Malabar to the British in 1792, the synagogue building still remained in ruins.

In 1909, the old 19th-century building was rebuilt (in part or in full) on the same foundation. There is also another view on the existence of historical evidence indicating that the synagogue was constructed in 1597.

=== After aliyah in 1955 ===
When the Mala Jewish community started migrating to Israel in 1955, the synagogue was handed over to Mala Gram Panchayat on 20 December 1954. The Panchayat now owns the synagogue and it was used as a hall. The synagogue comes with a cemetery which was also handed over Mala Gram Panchayat on 1 April 1955.

== Architecture ==
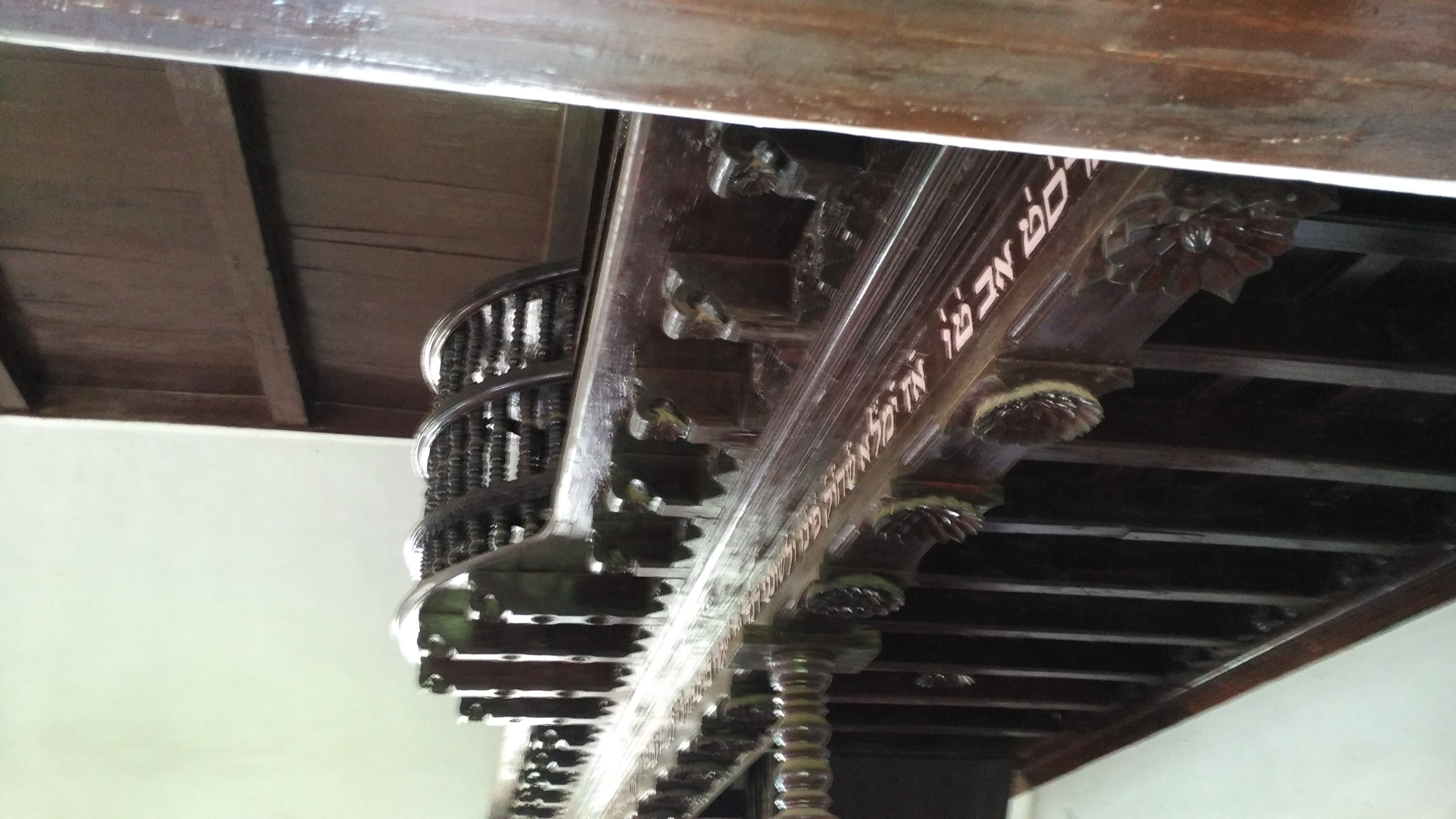
Women's seat inside the synagogue

All the eight synagogues in Kerala built during the recent centuries — located at Chendamangalam, Paravoor, Mala, Kochi and Ernakulam — have similar traditional architectural features:

- a central bimah of brass or silver metal on a concrete or stone base
- an ark on the western wall
- a balcony above the eastern entry to the sanctuary that is used by the reader on certain holidays.
- a women's gallery behind the balcony, with a stairway leading up to it, usually from outside the building.

== See also ==
- History of the Jews in India
- List of synagogues in India
