= Kadavumbhagam Mattancherry Synagogue =

Former synagogue in Kochi, Kerala, India

- Hebrew: בית הכנסת; Malayalam: കടവു൦ഭാഗ൦ മട്ടാഞ്ചേരി ജൂതപള്ളി
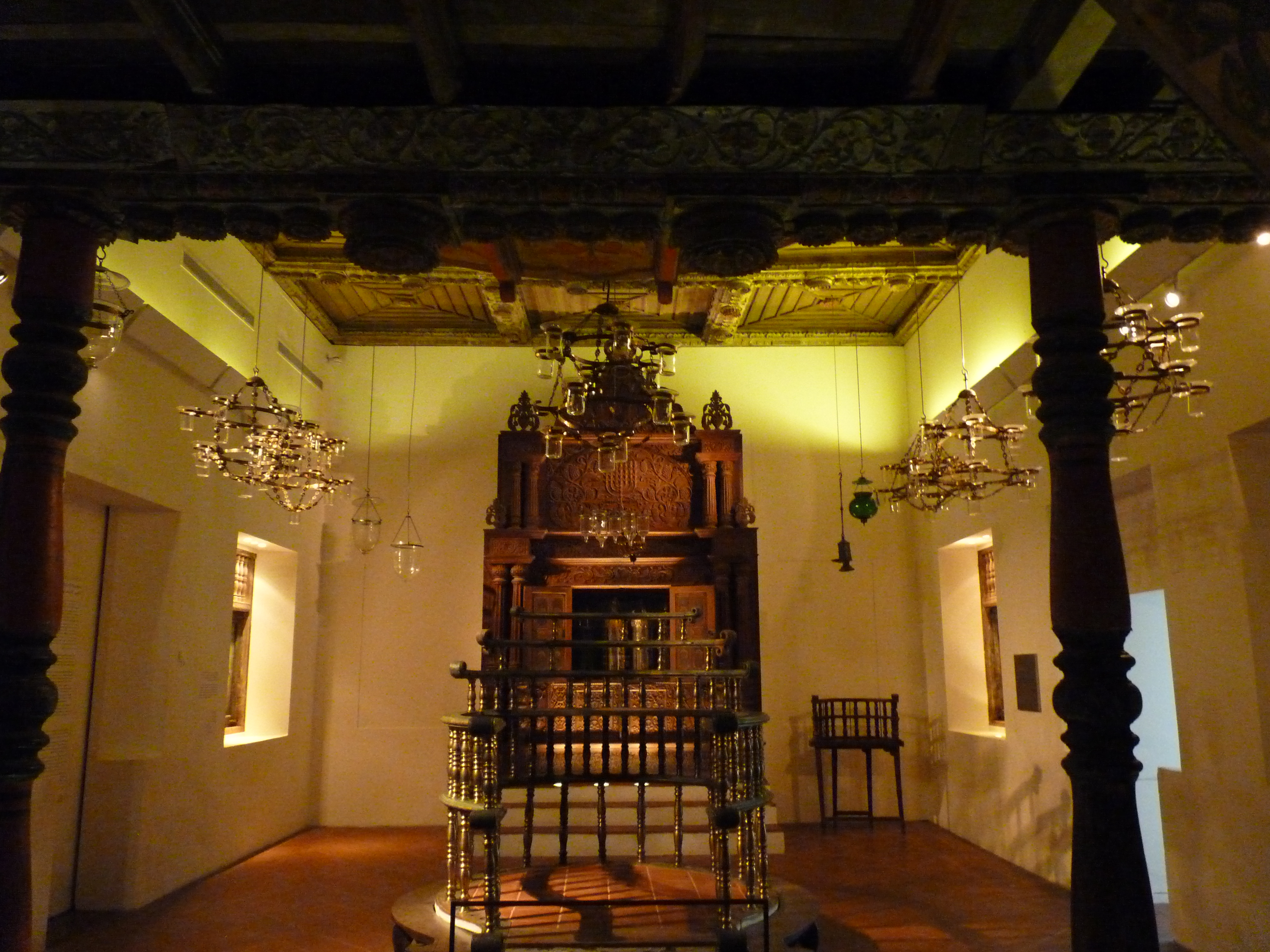
- The former synagogue interior, now part of the Israel Museum, in Jerusalem

- Location of the former synagogue in Kerala

Religion
- Affiliation: Judaism (former)
- Rite: Nusach Sefard
- Ecclesiastical or organizational status: Synagogue (1544–1950s); Jewish museum (in development)
- Status: Under restoration

Location
- Location: Mattancherry, Ernakulam district, Kerala
- Country: India
- Interactive map of Kadavumbhagam Mattancherry Synagogue
- Coordinates: 9°57′11″N 76°15′37″E

Architecture
- Type: Synagogue architecture
- Style: Cochin Jewish
- Founder: Malabar Jews
- Completed: 1544 CE
- Direction of façade: South

The Kadavumbhagam Mattancherry Synagogue (Hebrew: בית הכנסת; Malayalam: കടവു൦ഭാഗ൦ മട്ടാഞ്ചേരി ജൂതപള്ളി), also known as the Kadavumbhagam Synagogue, is a former synagogue, located in Mattancherry, a locality in Kochi, in the Ernakulam district, in the coastal state of Kerala, India.

Abandoned in the 1950s, the former synagogue in to be preserved as a Jewish museum.

== History ==
Completed in 1544 CE by the Malabar Jews, it is one of the oldest extant synagogues in India. The Malabar Jews are the earliest Jewish settlers in India, believed to have arrived as traders in the ancient port city of Muziris. It was the second to be built in Mattancherry, and is one of three synagogues in the area.

The name of the synagogue is believed to refer to a much older synagogue that once stood in Kodungaloor. The former Kadavumbhagam Synagogue is considered as one of the most ornately carved and decorated of the Malabar Synagogues in Kerala, particularly its wooden furnishes and interior sanctuary. The name means "by the riverside" and refers to a boat dock that stood opposite the complex until the 1960s. This palli (synagogue) was renowned for its divine miracles and stories associated and was revered by both the Malabar Jews and non Jewish locals.

In 1955, the entire congregation made aliyah to Israel leaving the synagogue in disuse. It was initially encroached upon and later made into a warehouse for coir storage. The interior furniture and women's bimah were shipped and preserved in the Israel Museum while its hekal is presently in moshav Nehalim in Israel.

In September 2019, after decades of neglect, the entire front portion of the sanctuary collapsed in the heavy monsoon rainfall. After much public outcry, the Kerala Archaeology Department took possession of the monument to save it. The former synagogue is being restored to function as a Jewish heritage museum.

== See also ==
- History of the Jews in India
- List of synagogues in India
- List of synagogues in Kerala
