= Paravur Synagogue =

Former synagogue in North Paravur, Kerala, India

- Hebrew: בית הכנסת פראבור; Malayalam: പറവൂർ ജൂതപള്ളി
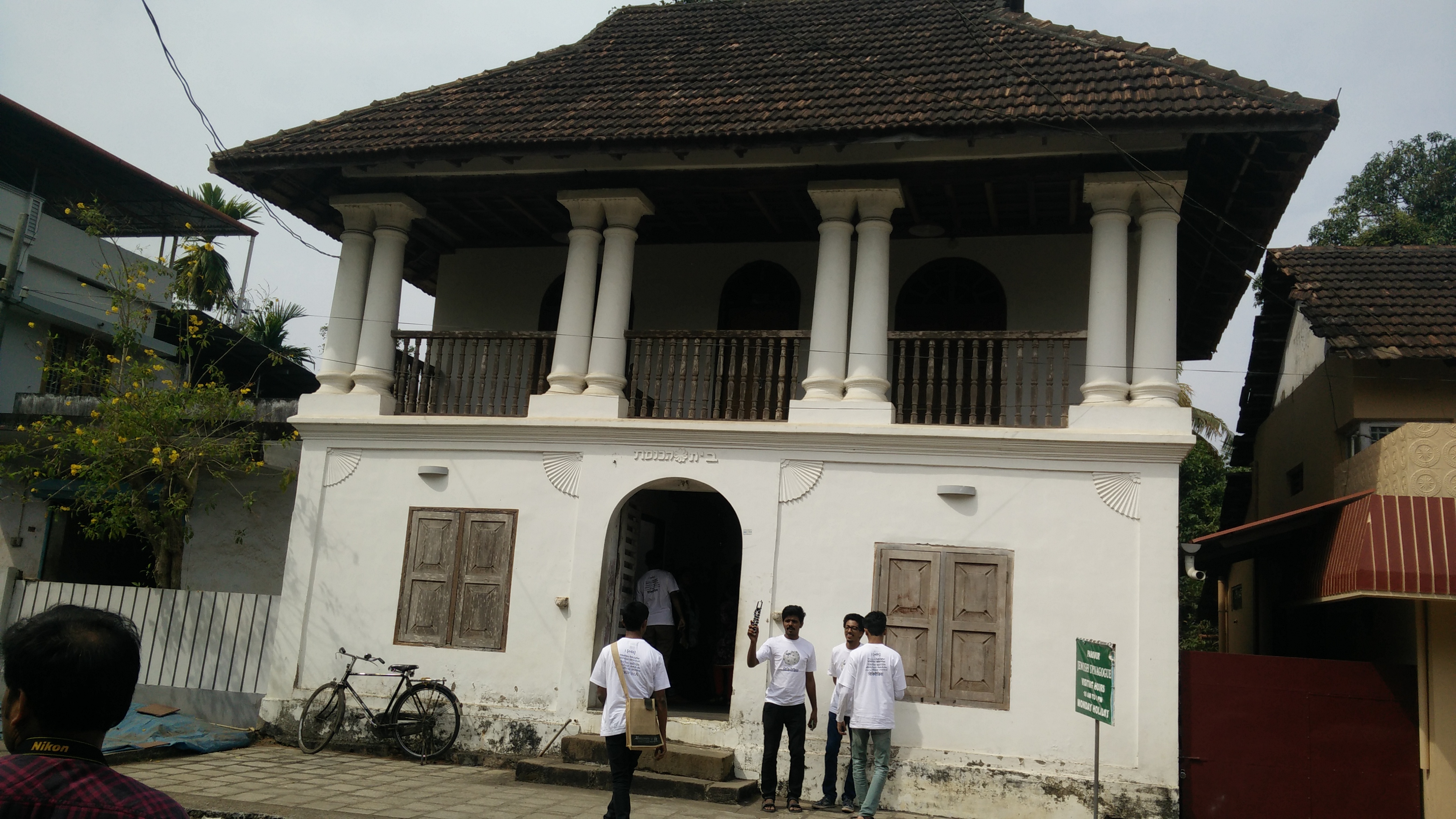
- The former synagogue in 2019

- Location of the synagogue in Kerala

Religion
- Affiliation: Judaism (former)
- Rite: Nusach Sefard
- Ecclesiastical or organisational status: Synagogue (1616–1988); Jewish museum (since 2014)
- Status: Closed (as a synagogue); Repurposed

Location
- Location: Jewish Street, Paravur Taluk, Kerala
- Country: India
- Coordinates: 10°10′47″N 76°12′35″E

Architecture
- Type: Synagogue architecture
- Style: Cochin Jewish architecture; Portuguese colonial architecture
- Completed: 1616
- Direction of façade: South

The Paravur Synagogue (Hebrew: בית הכנסת פראבור; Malayalam: പറവൂർ ജൂതപള്ളി), also known as the Parur Synagogue, is a former synagogue, located on Jewish Street in North Paravur (Parur), in the state of Kerala, India. The former synagogue is one of the largest and most complete among the Jewish synagogues in Kerala.

Built by the Malabar Jews, it has undergone successive phases of destruction and reconstruction. The present synagogue complex dates from 1616 CE, but it was built on top of a much older building speculated to have been constructed as early as 750 CE or 1105 CE, making it one of the oldest synagogues in India and the Commonwealth of Nations. The former synagogue is closed for worship. It has been renovated by the Government of Kerala and, in 2014, was opened to the public as the Kerala Jews History Museum, a Jewish museum.

== History ==
Jewish people had been arriving in Kerala since 1st millennia BC for trading, and their communities were mostly settled around today's Kodungallur region (which was then a trading port named Muziris) and Kollam. They received royal patronage and special rights from the local Chera kings such as Cheraman Perumal and established Synagogues at their respective settlements for public worship. This was documented in the copper plates dated 10th century AD issued by Bhaskara Ravi Varman to the Jewish community leader Joseph Rabban.

In the 14th century AD, after the Periyar Flood of 1341 (that also caused a Tsunami, according to some sources), the community had to relocate to nearby towns such as Paravur, Chendamangalam and Kochi. Memories of this incident were preserved by oral tradition through traditional songs in Jewish Malayalam.

The Paravur Synagogue is among the oldest synagogues that still exist in Kerala and is also the largest Synagogue complex. The current synagogue was built in 1615 AD at the Jewish Street of Paravur and very close to the Paravur Market where the Jewish community had settled and worked as traders. However, traditional accounts hint at a much older heritage, indicating that it was built on top of the ruins of an older synagogue dated 1165 AD.

=== Synagogue in the Piyyutim of Cochin Jews ===
Although the community lived peacefully throughout their history among the locals, there were conflicts due to foreign invaders such as Mysore Kingdom (during the Malabar raids led by Hyder Ali and his son Tipu Sultan during the 18th century) and European colonizers such as Portuguese and Dutch during 16th and 17th centuries. According to a traditional Jewish Malayalam song, the synagogue was put to fire in 1662, most likely by the Portuguese, at around the same time when the Paradesi Synagogue near Fort Kochi was also burnt.

After the modern State of Israel was established in 1948, the Paravur Jews started to make aliyah. As of 1949, there were about three hundred Jews still living in Paravur, but most of them immigrated to Israel in large numbers by the mid 1950s. By 1970s, the public worship at the synagogue ceased as the minyan (the quorum or minimum number of 10 Jewish adults required to conduct worship) could not be met and the Synagogue largely remained unattended during later decades. The last ever worship service was conducted in 1988.

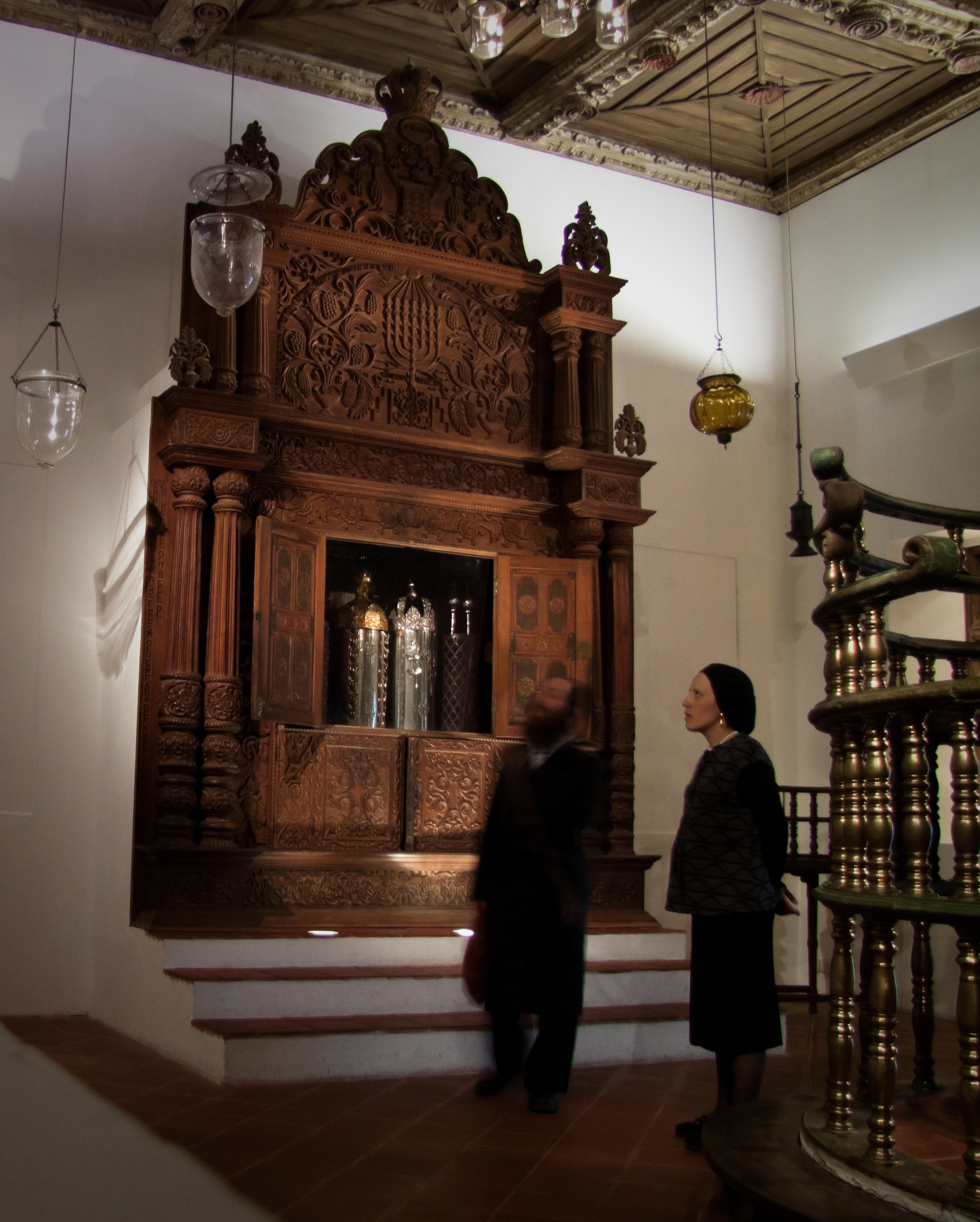
The ark and bima of the Parur Synagogue are now displayed in the Israel Museum in Jerusalem

According to a report by the International Survey of Jewish Monuments (ISJM), the original bimah and the ark (containing Torah scrolls) were moved to Israel in 1995 and preserved there.

=== Kerala Jews Lifestyle Museum ===
In 1996, the synagogue was declared as a protected monument, however it continued to remain mostly neglected until 2009 when it was handed over to the Kerala State Department of Archaeology. Since 2010, the Government renovated the dilapidated structure as part of the Muziris Heritage Project and converted this into a museum to highlight the Jewish heritage of Kerala. They were opened to public in 2014.

== Architecture ==
The Paravur Synagogue is built with a unique blend of traditional Jewish Synagogue architecture as well as Kerala architectural styles. This is most evident in the use of padippura (arched gateway) along the path that leads to the main building.

=== Structure ===
Similar to the architecture of other synagogues in Kerala, it has a balcony and a separate gallery for women to assemble, with direct access from outside through a staircase.

The exterior inner wall of the Synagogue compound also holds a plaque dated 1616, with Hebrew text engraved on a stone slab under the name of David Ya’acov Castiel Mudaliar, the fourth Mudaliyar (community leader) of the Kerala Jews, who was instrumental in the rebuilding of the Synagogue.

== Paravur Jewish Cemetery ==
Paravur Jewish Cemetery is situated to next to Lakshmi College Paravoor.

== Gallery ==
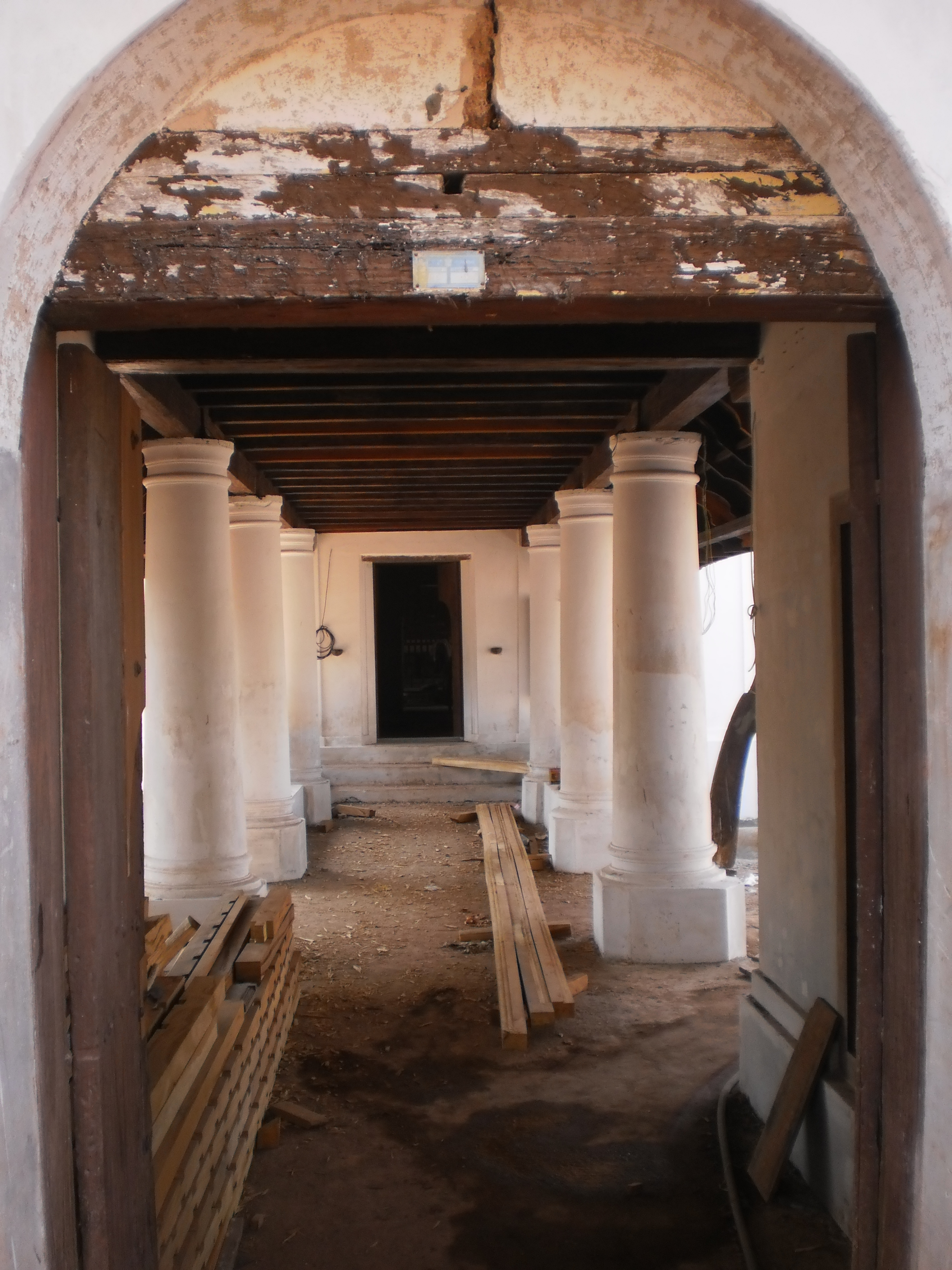

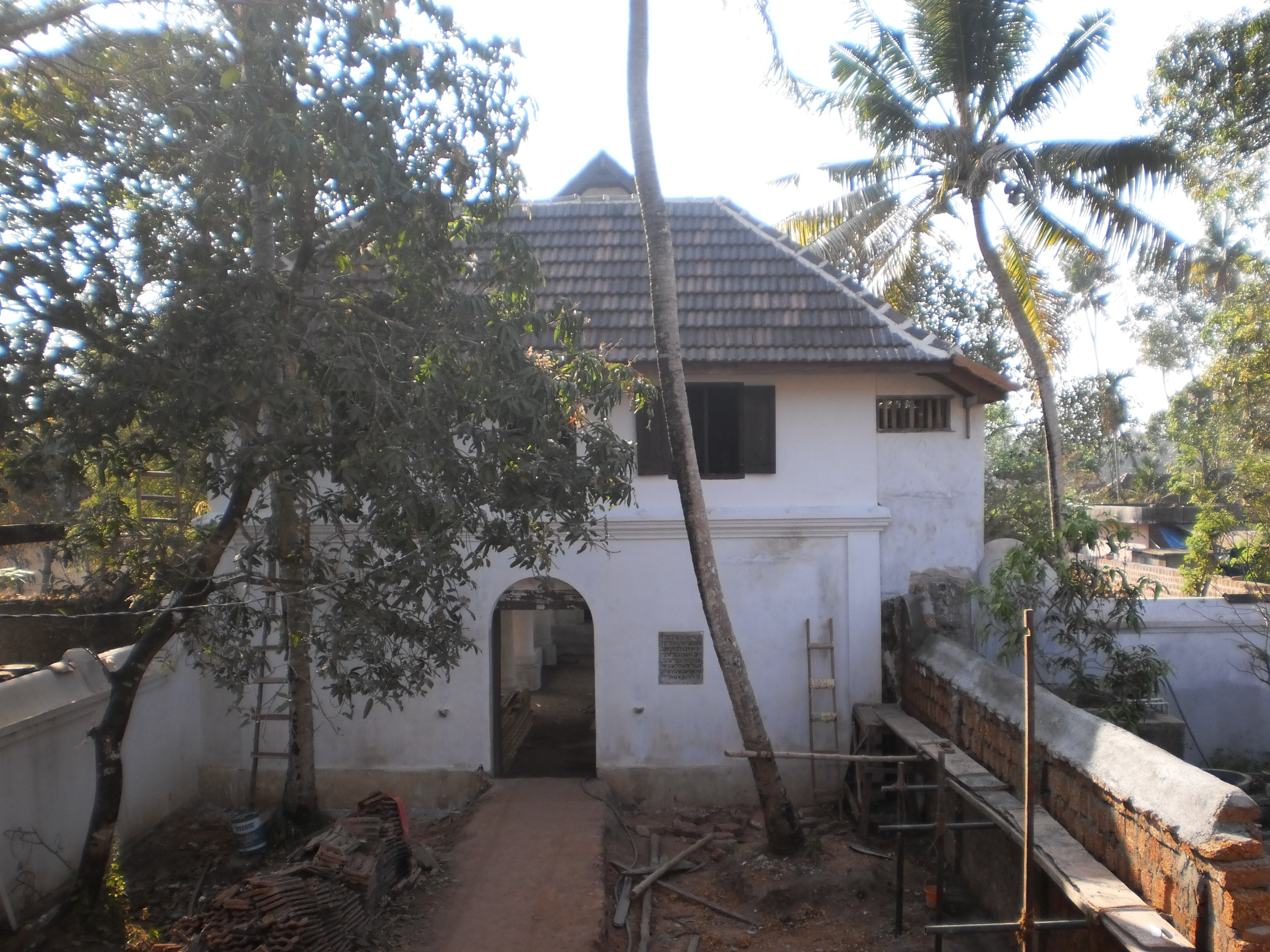

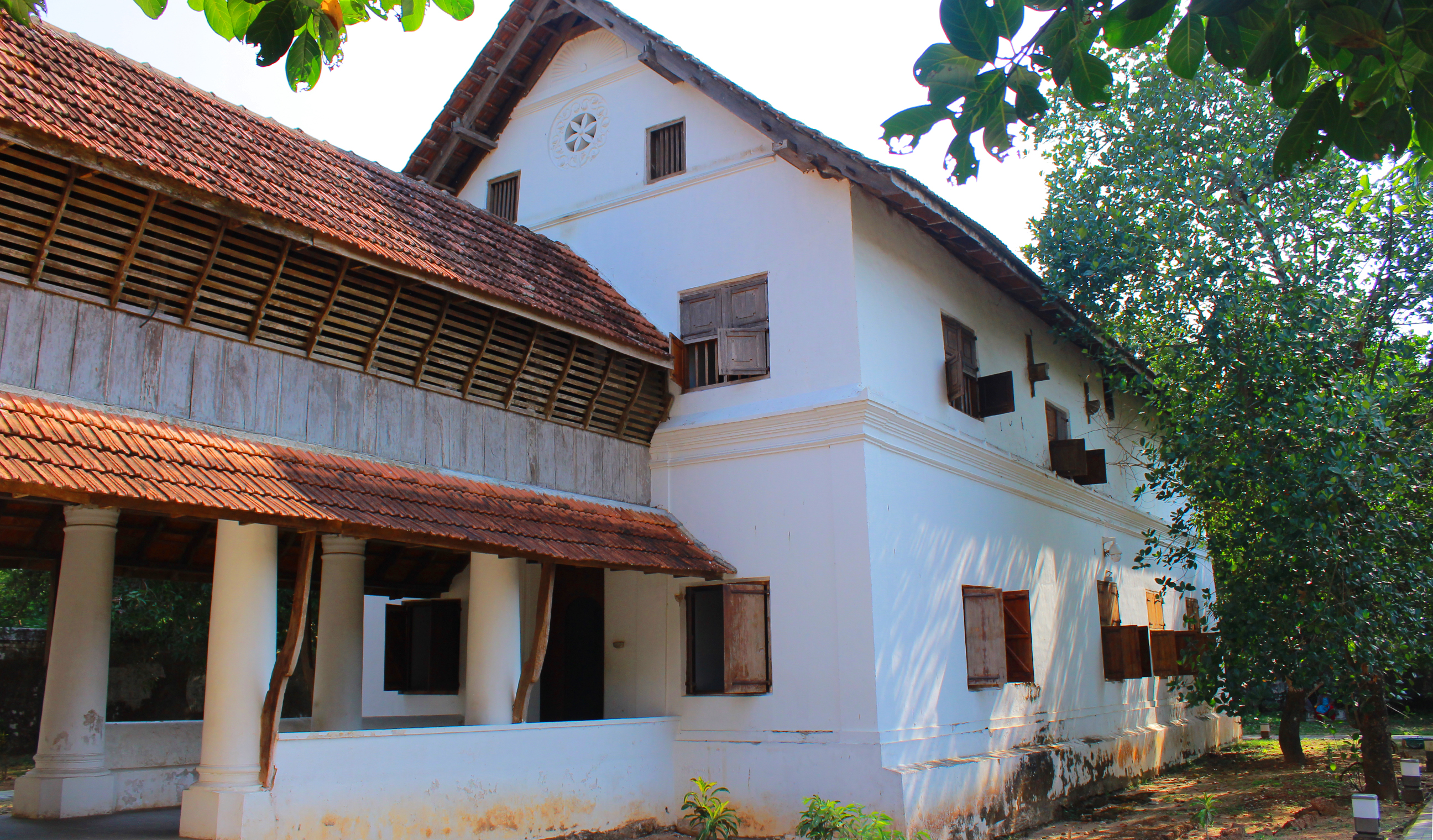

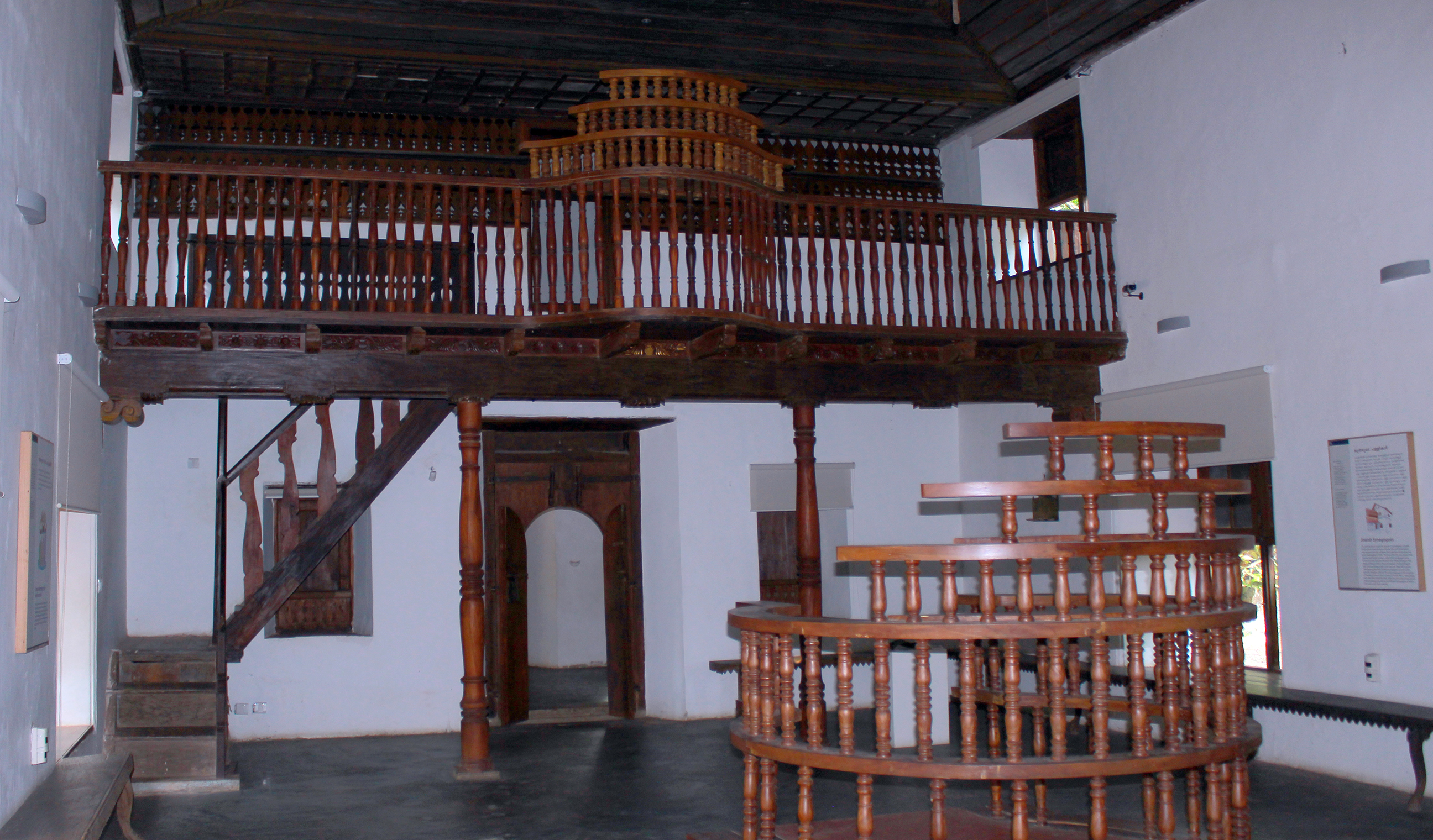

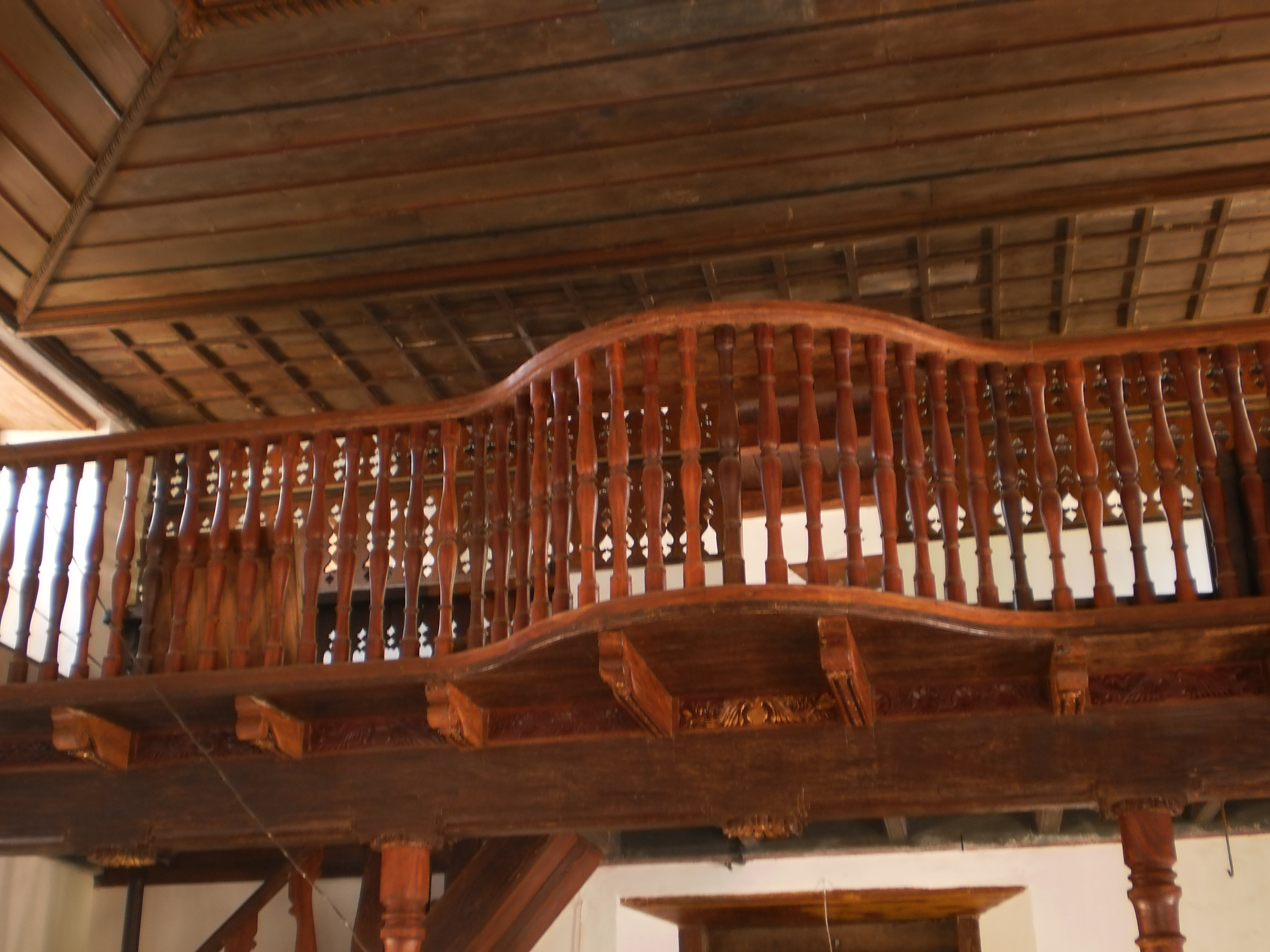

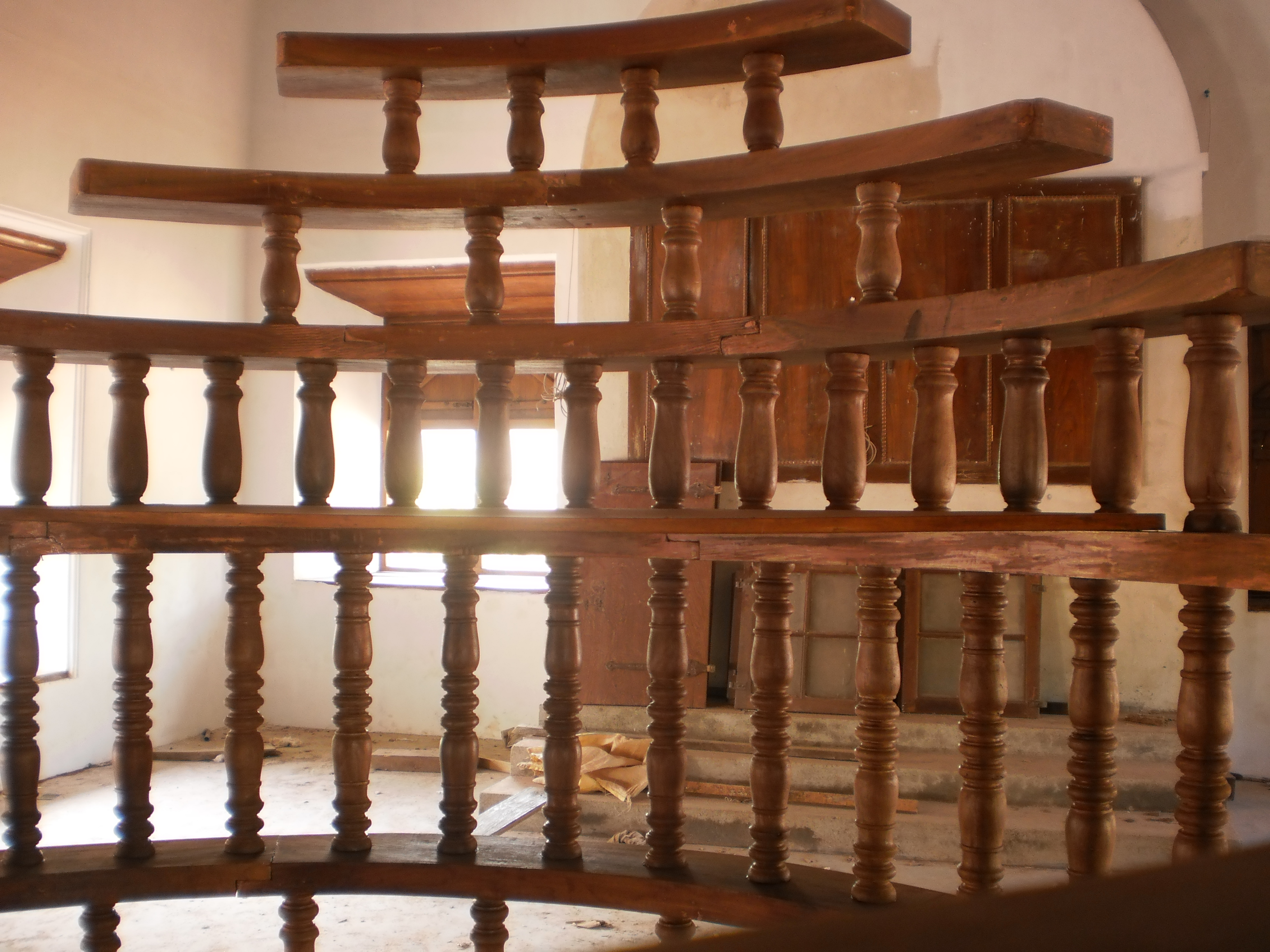

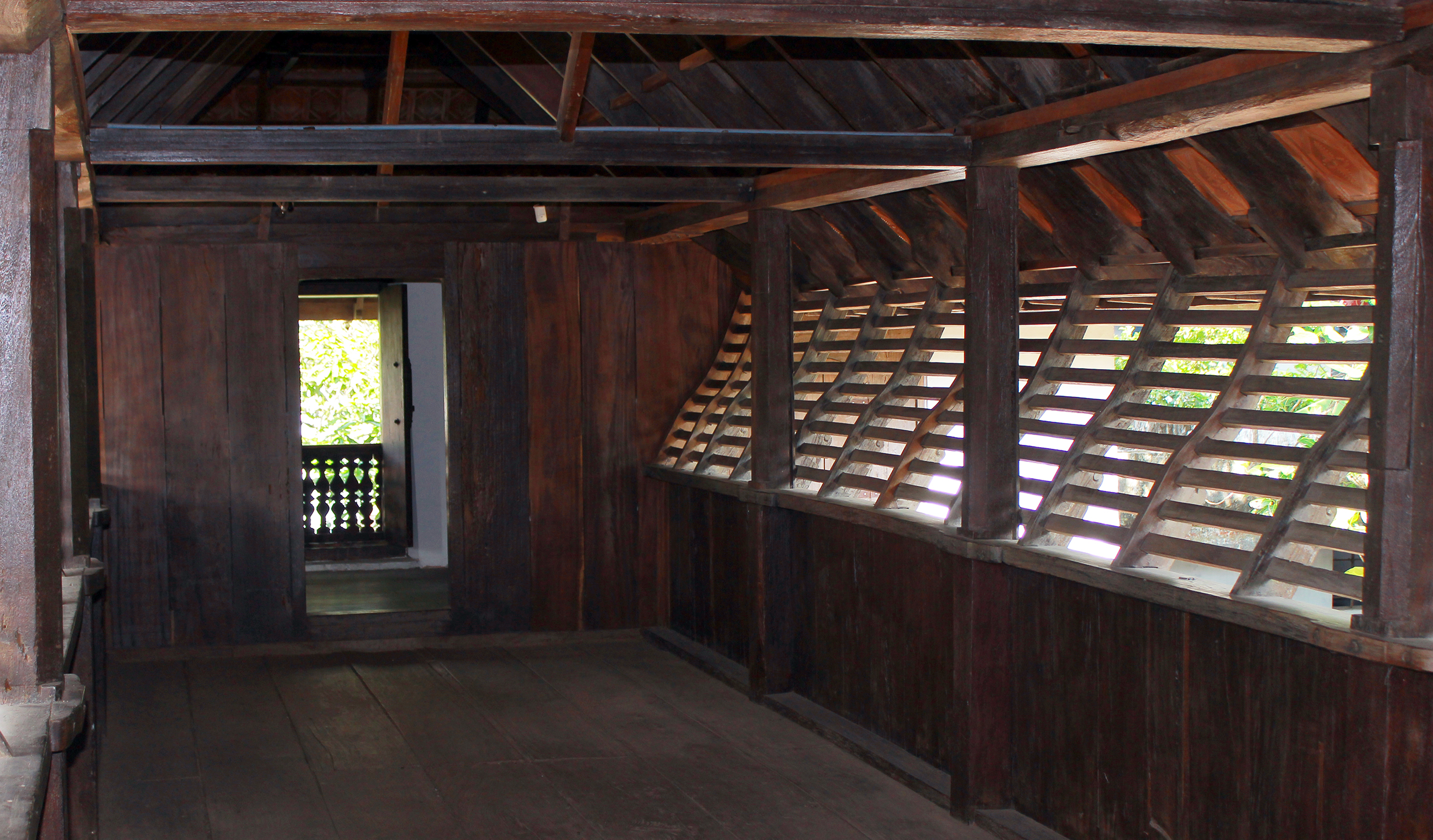

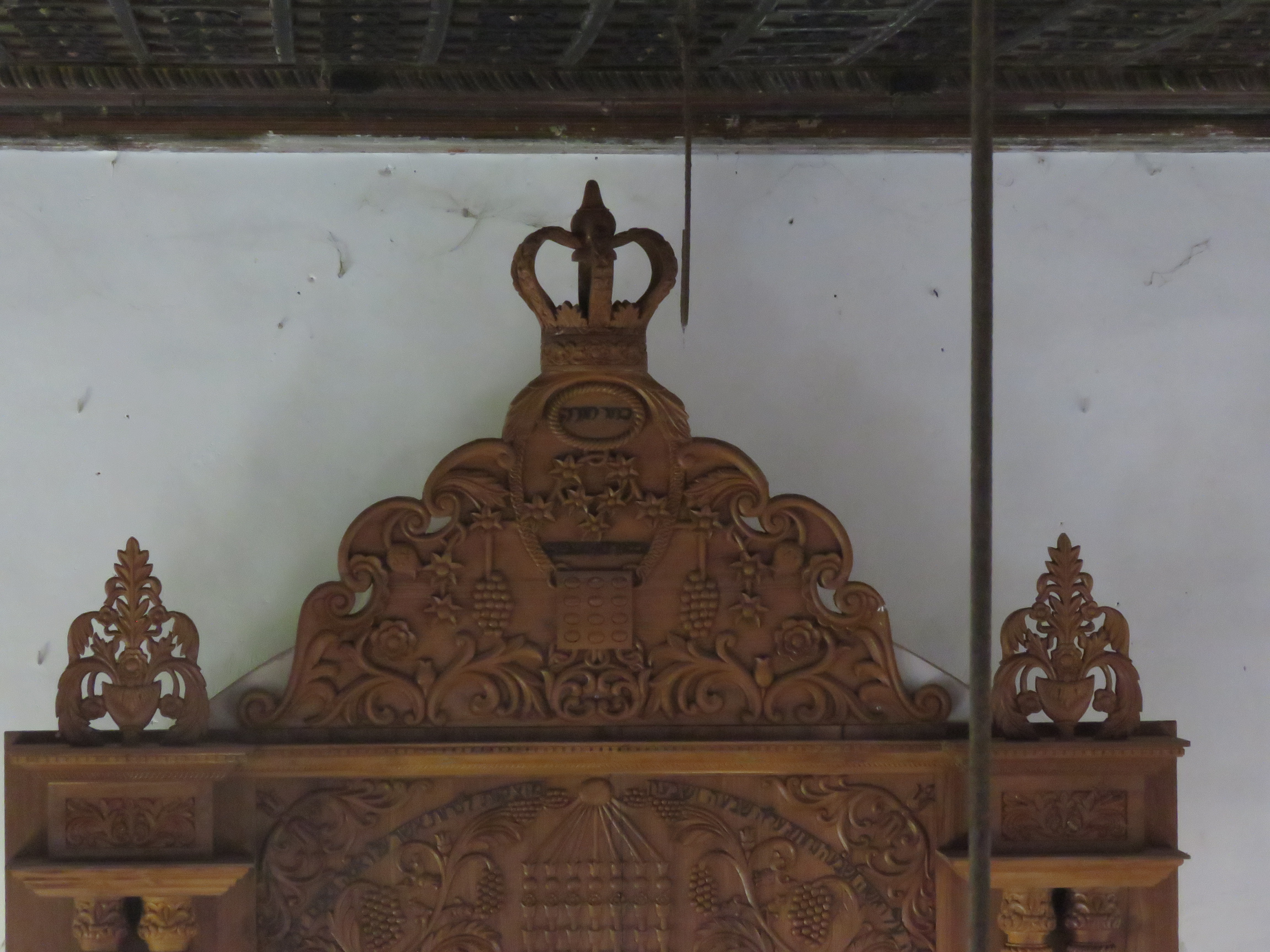

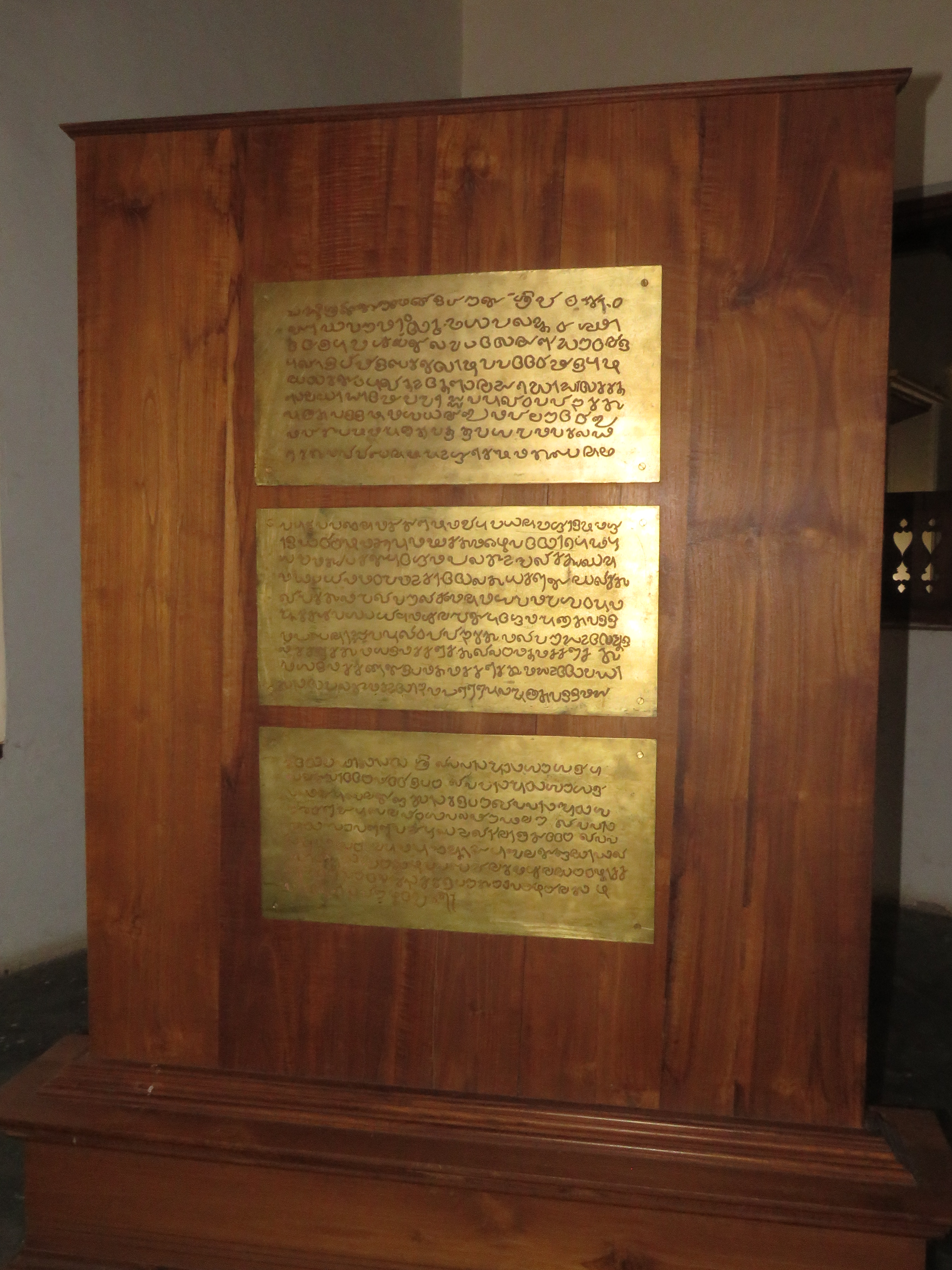

== See also ==
- History of the Jews in India
- List of synagogues in India
- List of synagogues in Kerala
