= Historic synagogues =

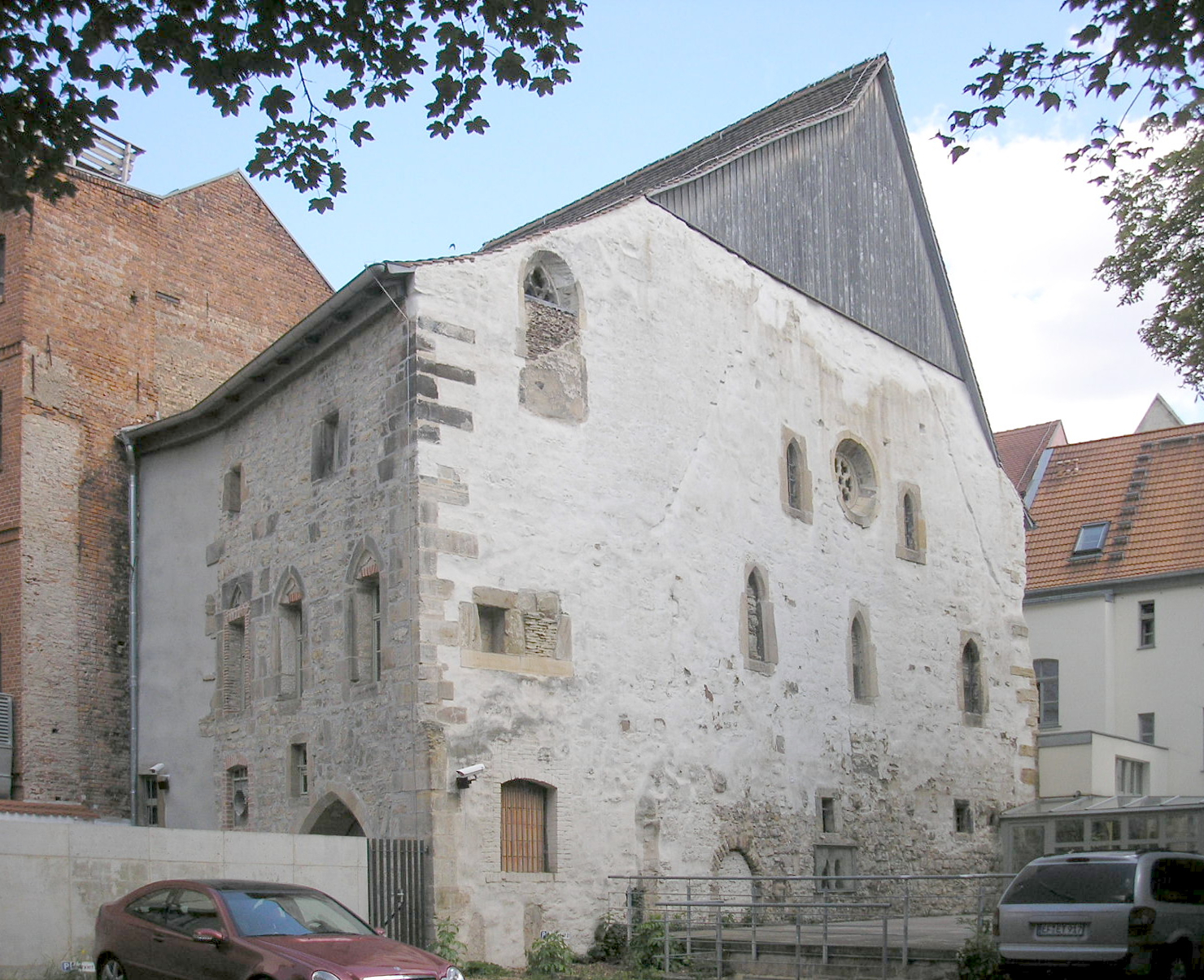
The Old Synagogue in Erfurt, Germany, portions of which date from c. 1100

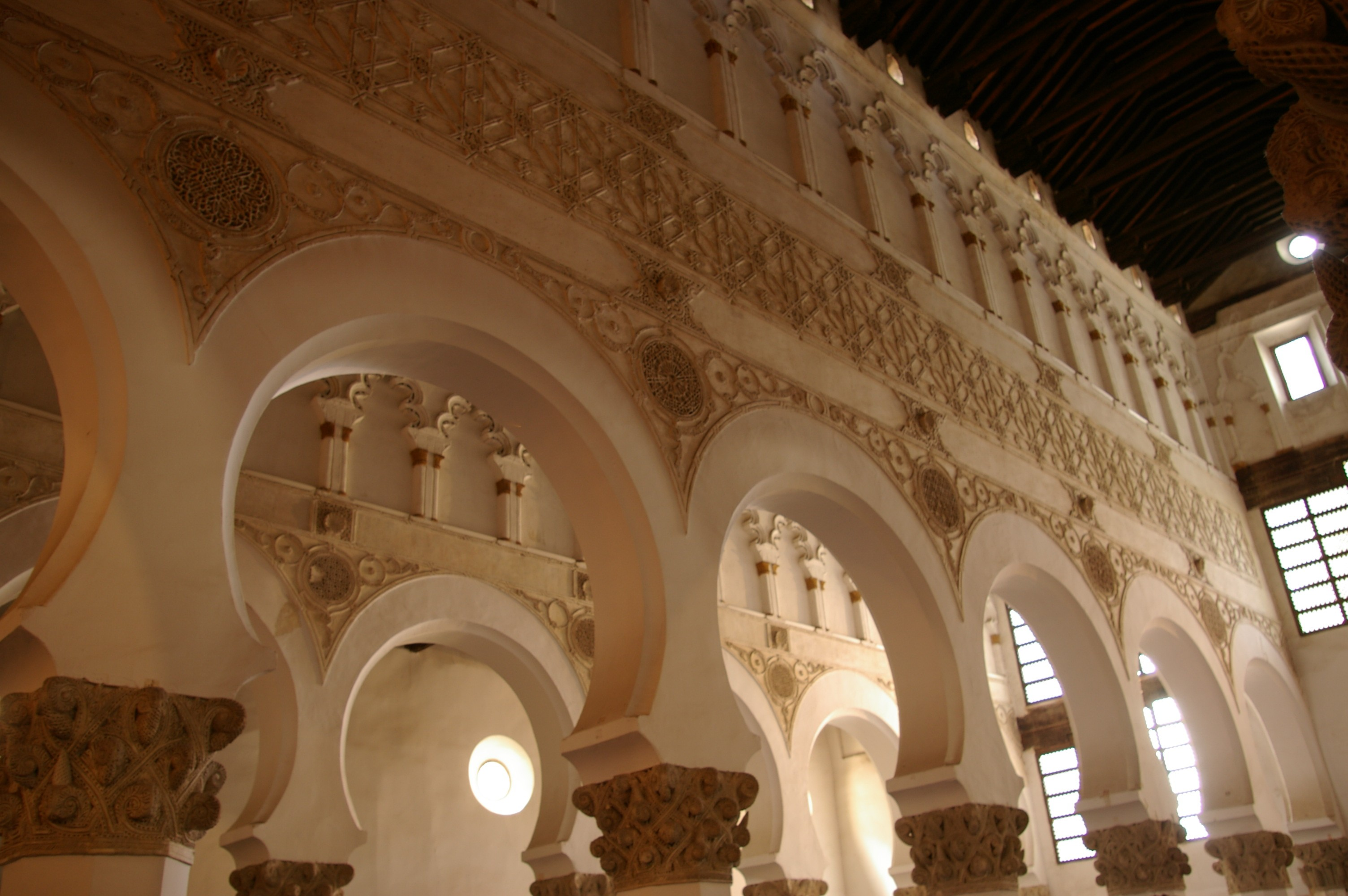
The Synagogue of Santa María la Blanca was built in Toledo, Spain, in 1190.

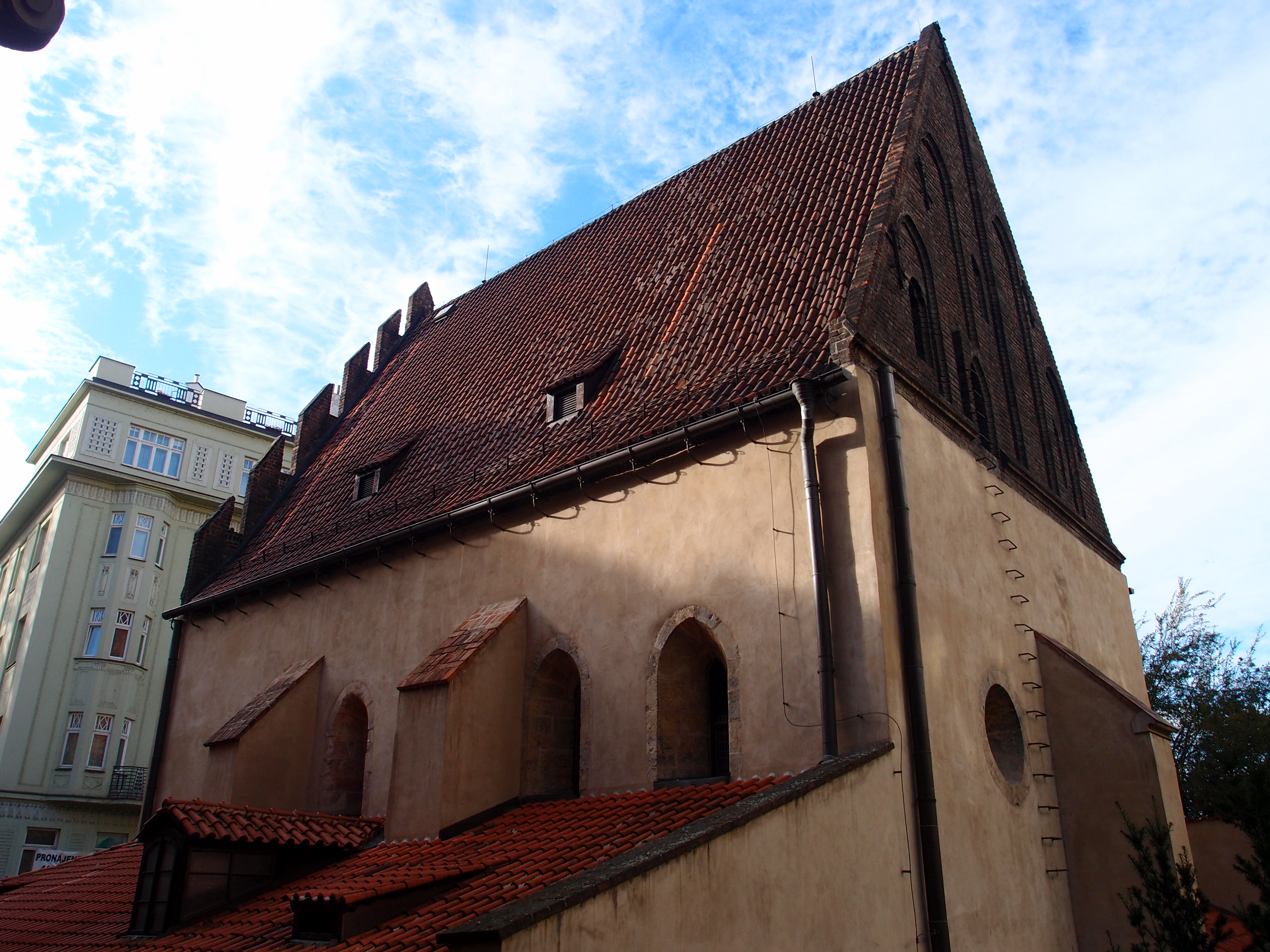
The Old New Synagogue in Prague, Bohemia (Czech Republic), the oldest synagogue in continuous use, built around 1270, compares similarly with the Ramban synagogue in Safed, modern Israel.

Historic synagogues are synagogues that date back to ancient or medieval times and synagogues that represent the earliest Jewish presence in cities around the world. Most of the older sites covered below are purely archaeological sites, with evidence recovered by excavation, and no sign of use as a synagogue in recent centuries. Some synagogues were destroyed and rebuilt several times on the same site. Others were converted into churches and mosques or used for other purposes.

== History ==
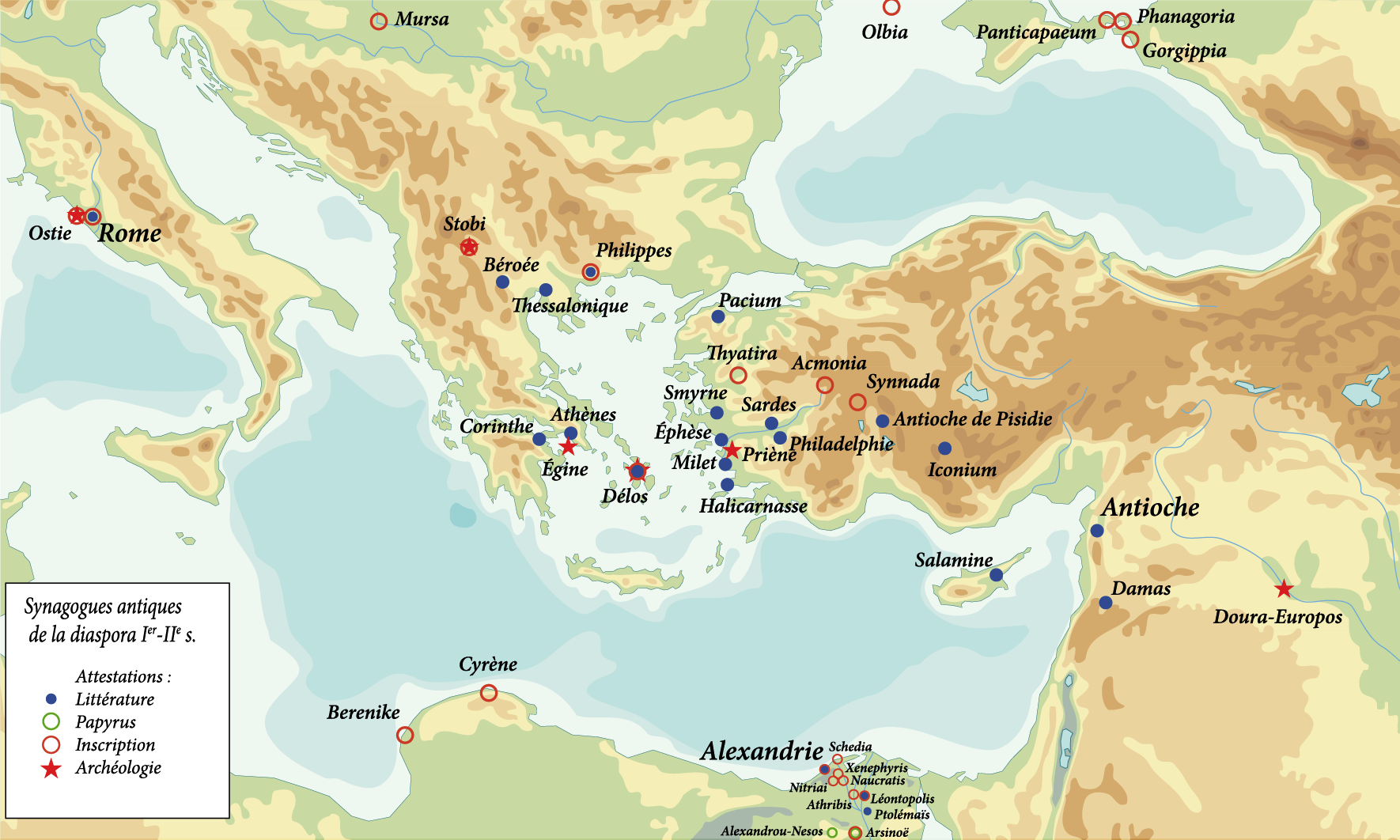

Evidence of synagogues from the 3rd century BC was discovered on Elephantine island. The findings consist of two synagogue dedication inscription stones and a reference to a synagogue in an Elephantine letter dated to 218 BC.

What some consider to be the oldest synagogue building uncovered by archaeologists is the Delos Synagogue, a possible Samaritan synagogue dating from at 150 to 128 BC or earlier on the island of Delos, Greece. However, it is uncertain if the building is actually a synagogue and that designation is generally considered untenable.

An excavated structure known as the Jericho synagogue has been cited as the oldest synagogue in the Holy Land, although whether the remains are of a synagogue is unclear. It was built between 70 and 50 BC as part of a Herodian winter palace complex near Jericho.

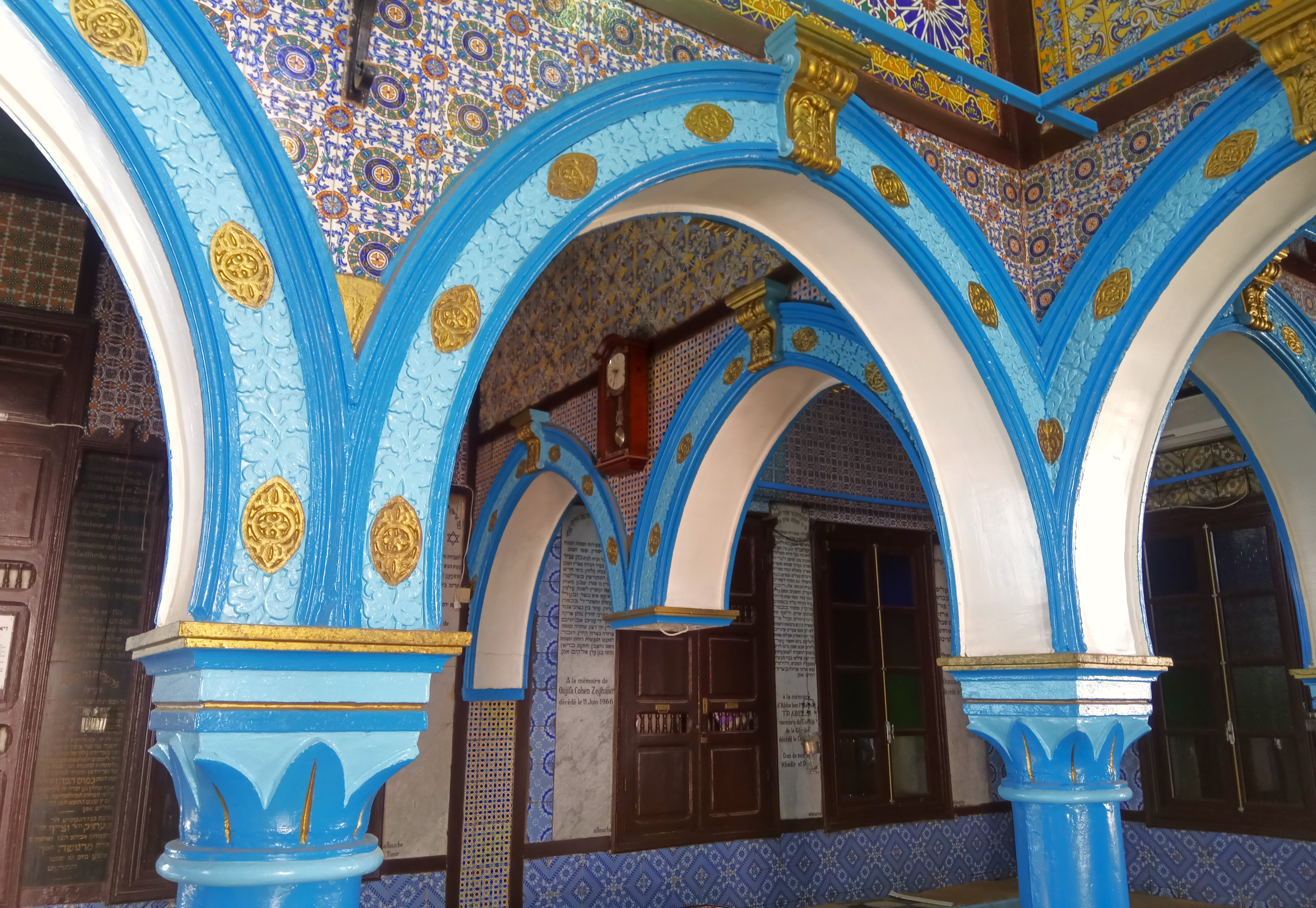
El Ghriba Synagogue with its distinctive wall tiles imitating the qallalin type in colors and patterns

El Ghriba Synagogue in Djerba, now in Tunisia, is the oldest synagogue in Africa, and Djerba Island was declared a World Heritage Site in 2023. It was the site of pilgrimage as it was said to have been built after the fall of the Temple in Jerusalem by refugees who brought a fragment of the Temple's door, hence its local name as "the Door". Its wall tiles are colored similar to the prestigious qallalin tiles.

Two claimants as the oldest synagogue structures still standing are the Old Synagogue in Erfurt, Germany, which was built c. 1100 and the Synagogue of Santa María la Blanca in Toledo, Spain, which was built in 1190. However, neither has been used as a synagogue for centuries.

The oldest active synagogue in Europe is the Old New Synagogue of Prague in the Czech Republic, built in the 1270s. The Ben Ezra Synagogue of Cairo is the longest-serving synagogue in the world, having continuously served as one from 1025 until the mid-20th century. Owing to the Jewish exodus from the Muslim world, the building is no longer used as a synagogue. It has been renovated and is now a museum.

== By country ==
=== Africa ===
==== Algeria ====
- Synagogue of Tlemcen was built around 1392. When Rabbi Ephraim Alnaqua, a Spanish refugee who was the son of the author of Menorath HaMaor, settled in Agadir, he obtained permission for Jews to settle in the city of Tlemcen, where he built a synagogue.

==== Egypt ====
Stone synagogue dedication inscriptions stones found in middle and lower Egypt (see above), and dating from the 3rd century BC, are the oldest synagogue fragments found anywhere in the World.

The Ben Ezra Synagogue in Fustat, Old Cairo, occupied at least three buildings in its history, which probably goes back to pre-Islamic times. There have been many major and minor renovations. The current building dates from the 1890s; due to the lack of a local Jewish community it now functions as a Jewish museum. The Cairo genizah, found in the rafters of an outhouse in the 19th century is a unique and much-studied collection of medieval documents, and gives good evidence that the synagogue predates 882 at the least.

==== Libya ====
- Slat Abn Shaif Synagogue, in Zliten, Libya, was built around 1060 and destroyed in the 1980s.

==== Morocco ====
- The Al Fassiyine Synagogue in Fes, Morocco, is thought to have been built in the 13th century AD.
- The Adobe Synagogue in Arazan is over 800 years old.

==== South Africa ====
- The Gardens Shul, established 1841, is the oldest congregation in South Africa. Its 1863 building, which is still standing, may be the oldest synagogue building in the country. Rabbi Osher Feldman is the Rabbi of the Gardens Shul.

==== Tunisia ====
- El Ghriba synagogue, according to legend, the construction of the synagogue goes back to the High Priests' escape following the destruction of Solomon's Temple by the Babylonians under Nebuchadnezzar II in the year 586 BC (or, alternately, the destruction of the Second Temple in 70 AD). The High Priests carried with them a door and a stone of the destroyed Temple. Thus the synagogue links the Jewish diaspora to the "sole sanctuary of Judaism". In modern times, the local Jews are distinguished by their dress, which includes a black band around their pants, which signifies the destruction of the Temple.

=== Asia ===
==== Afghanistan ====
- In Herat, Afghanistan, the Yu Aw Synagogue still stands. There is no definitive date for the synagogue.

==== India ====
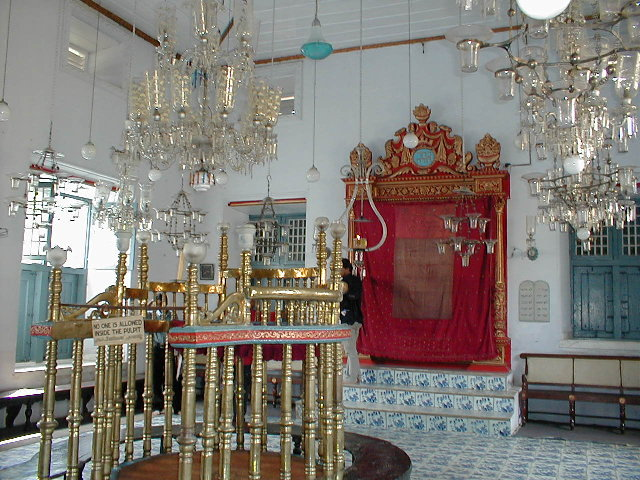
The Paradesi Synagogue in Kochi, India

The oldest of India's synagogue buildings can be found in the state of Kerala, where synagogue construction began during the medieval period. Whereas Kerala's first Jewish houses of prayer said to be from the eleventh through the 13th centuries perished long ago as a consequence of natural disasters, enemy attacks, or the abandonment of buildings when congregations shifted. These extant synagogues, though altered over time, include not only the oldest found on the Indian subcontinent but in the British Commonwealth.

The consensus among historians based on a compilation of limited recorded history and a mélange of oral narratives is that first synagogues in Kerala were not built until the medieval period. Various Kerala Jews and the scholars who have studied the community believe that the earliest synagogues in the region date to the early 11th century. According to a narrative, a Kerala Jew by the name of Joseph Rabban who accepted on behalf of his community copper plates granting the local Jews a set of privileges by the Hindu King Bhaskara Ravi Varman was also given wood by his Highness for the erection of a synagogue around 1000. While no physical evidence of this and any other similar period building survives, study of the literature, Jewish folksongs, and narratives supports the notion that synagogues likely stood in Malabar Coast towns, places now within the modern-day State of Kerala, from this epoch. A portion of these medieval-period buildings perished when the Kerala Jews had to leave them behind under the threat of persecution by the Moors and the Portuguese or as a result of natural disasters. The balance was rebuilt as a consequence of naturally occurring or intentionally set fires, modernization efforts, or assorted other variables.

- The Kochangadi Synagogue (1344 to 1789 AD) in Kochi in the Kerala, built by the Malabar Jews. It was destroyed by Tipu Sultan in 1789 AD and was never rebuilt. An inscription tablet from this synagogue is the oldest relic from any synagogue in India.
- The Paravur Synagogue (750 or 1164 AD) in Paravur in Kochi, Kerala, built by the Malabari Jews, operating as a Kerala Jews' Lifestyle Museum, the present 1616 AD structure was built on top of an older structure whose foundation remains were unearthed and are kept on display.
- The Paradesi Synagogue (1568 AD) in Kochi, Kerala. It is the oldest Jewish synagogue in India that is still in active use and the most complete, although there are even older ones still existing but not in active use anymore. The synagogue belongs to the Paradesi Jews.

==== Iraq ====
One of the oldest synagogues in history was the Great Synagogue of Baghdad, also known as the Shaf ve’Yativ Synagogue, located in one of the old quarters of Baghdad. The building is traditionally believed to stand on the site of an ancient synagogue built by King Jeconiah, who was exiled from the Kingdom of Judah to Babylon in 597 BCE. It is said that material gathered from the ruins of the Temple in Jerusalem was used in its construction, and supposedly accommodated approximately 20,000 worshippers. Due to its significance, other synagogues in Iraq followed in its architectural form. The synagogue has been rebuilt several times and now serves as a Jewish museum. Another old synagogue is a part of the Tomb of Joshua the High Priest also in Baghdad, a Jewish site that entombs Joshua the son of Jehozadak, the first High Priest after the return of the Jews from the Babylonian Captivity.

During the Iraq War, a rabbi in the American army found an abandoned, dilapidated synagogue near Mosul dating back to the 13th century. It is located 3.2 km (2 mi) northeast of Mosul, across the Tigris River, in a city called Nineveh, the city to which the prophet Jonah was sent to preach repentance. The Nineveh Synagogue was constructed by Daud Ibn Hodaya al-Daudi, Exilarch of Mosul. There is record of a second synagogue in Mosul, as early as 990, when the Gaon of Sura, Semah ibn Yitzhak, mentions "Sahl Aluf ibn Aluf our representative in Mosul", in 1170 Benjamin of Tudela notes that there are about 7,000 Jews in Mosul. In later years, when Petachiah of Regensburg visited Mosul, Nineveh was in ruins.

==== Israel and Palestinian territories ====
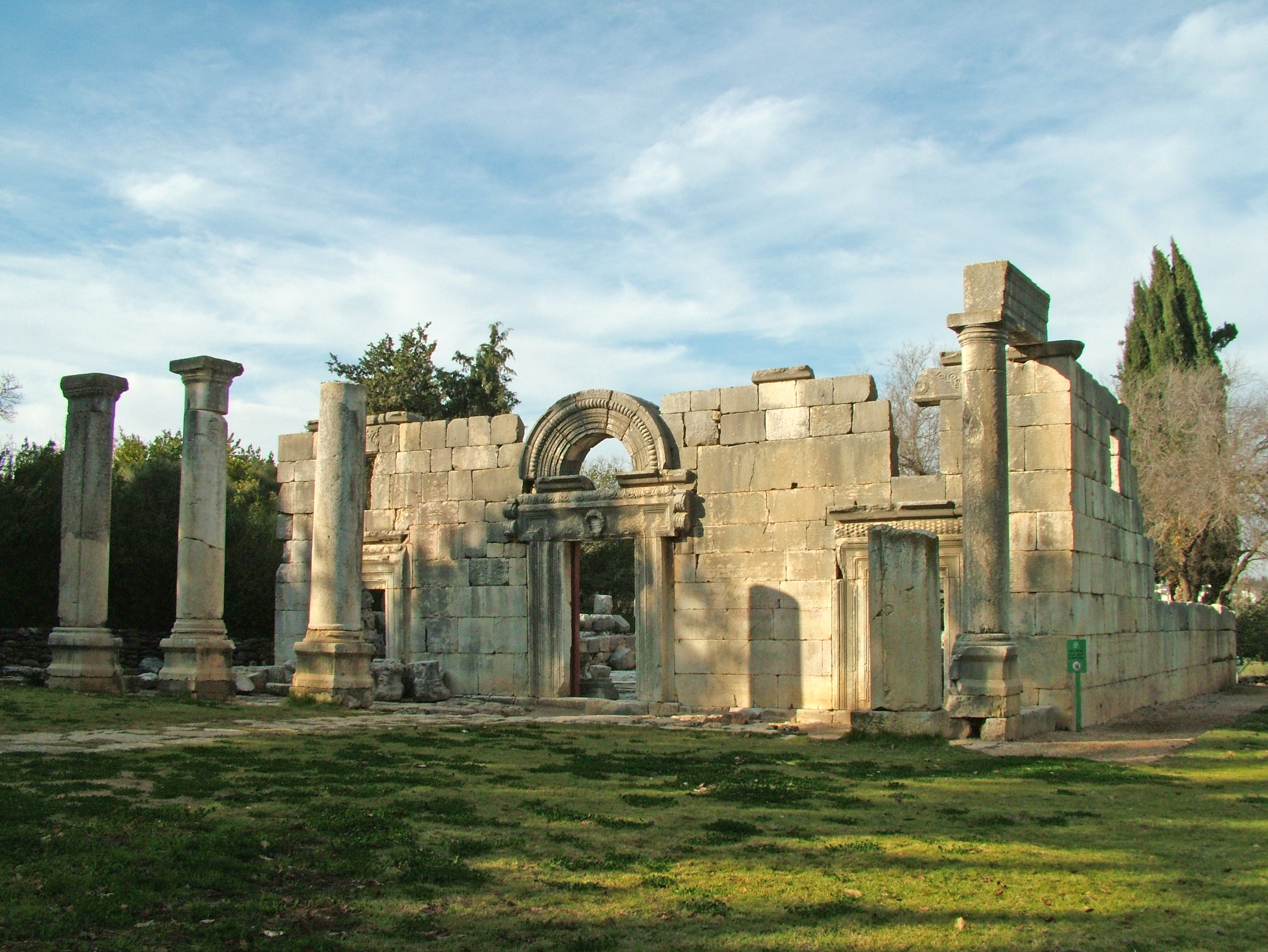
Ruins of the ancient synagogue of Kfar Bar'am in the Galilee

- "Wadi Qelt Synagogue" at Tulul Abu el-Alayiq, Jericho, 70–50 BC (Hasmonean); excavated and identified by Ehud Netzer; contested.
- Herodium – a synagogue from the 1st century AD was discovered in Herod's palace fortress at Herodium.
- Masada – the ruins of the small synagogue at the top of Masada is one of the most well-documented Second Temple Period synagogues.
- Migdal Synagogue was discovered in 2009. One of the unique features of this synagogue, which is located on the western shore of the Sea of Galilee, in Magdala, is an intricately carved stone block that was found in the center of the main room. Another synagogue dating to the same period was discovered in the city in 2021.
- Modi'in – a synagogue dating to the second century BC was discovered between Modi'in and Latrun.
- Qiryat Sefer/Modi'in Illit synagogue (1st century BC) – Israeli archaeologist Yitzhak Magen claimed in 1995 to have excavated a small first-century BC synagogue at Modi'in Illit/Qiryat Sefer, at a site known in Arabic as Khirbet Badd ‘Isa.

Other ancient post-70 AD synagogues are:

- The excavated Shalom Al Yisrael Synagogue in Jericho dates to the late 6th or early 7th century, and is frequented on the beginning of every Hebrew calendar month for prayers and services.
- A large 6th-century synagogue with a mosaic tile floor depicting King David was discovered in Gaza. An inscription states that the floor was donated in 508–509 AD by two merchant brothers.
- Jerusalem – there are synagogues in the Old City of Jerusalem built over the ruins of far older synagogues, which were destroyed by non-Jewish rulers of the city.
  - The Karaite Synagogue in Jerusalem is the oldest of Jerusalem's active synagogues, having been built in the 8th century. It was destroyed by the Crusaders in 1099 and Jews were not allowed to live in the city for 50 years. In 1187, Saladin restored the site to the Karaite Jews, who promptly rebuilt the synagogue. It has been active continuously since its foundation, except during the Crusades and Jordanian rule of the city (1948–1967). In 1967, the Israeli government returned the synagogue to the Karaite community, who finished renovating it in 1982.

==== Jordan ====
- In Jerash, Jordan, the remnants of a synagogue dating from Late Antiquity have been found beneath a church within the Decapolis.

==== Lebanon ====
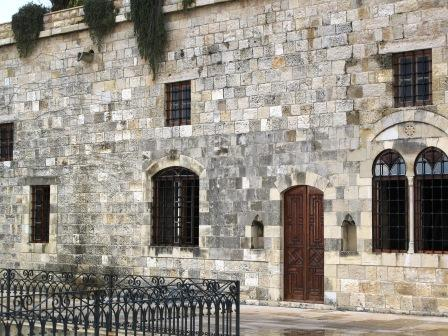
Lebanon's Deir el Qamar Synagogue

- In Lebanon, the Sidon Synagogue was built in 833 AD, on an older synagogue which is thought to have been built during the Second Temple period, in Ancient Israel, around 66 AD.
- Also, in Lebanon, in Deir el Qamar, a village in Mount Lebanon, another old synagogue that was built in the 17th century to serve the local Jewish population. As of 2016, the Synagogue is in excellent condition; yet, in the meantime, the synagogue has been shut to the public for security reasons and has been entrusted to the French cultural center by Lebanon's Direction Générale des Antiquités (General Directorate of Antiquities).

==== Myanmar ====
- The Musmeah Yeshua Synagogue in Rangoon (Yangon) was originally built in 1854. Located between shops and traders, the synagogue is still operating for the small community of Burmese Jews who live in Rangoon.

==== Syria ====
- The 3rd-century Dura-Europos synagogue established in 244 AD per dedicatory inscription on ceiling tile (though remodelled from an earlier synagogue)
- The 4th-century Apamea on Orontes Synagogue established in 392 AD per dedicatory inscription on mosaic.
- Jobar Synagogue, described as 2,000 years old. The main hall is at least mediaeval. However, the shrine (or "hever" attributed to the Prophet Elijah) beneath the former prayer hall resembles other Late Antique catacombs 3rd–6th century AD.
- Gamla – a synagogue was discovered near the city gate at Gamla, a site in the Golan northeast of the Sea of Galilee. This city was destroyed by the Roman army in 67 AD and was never rebuilt.

==== Turkey ====
- Sardis Synagogue was built by Babylonian Jews who were invited to Sardis by Seleucid King Antiochus III (223–187 BC). The Jews of Sardis are mentioned by Josephus Flavius in the 1st century AD, who refers to a decree of the Roman proquaestor Lucius Antonius from the previous century (50–49 BC): "Lucius Antonius, the son of Marcus, vice-quaestor, and vice-praetor, to the magistrates, senate, and people of the Sardians, sends greetings. Those Jews that are our fellow citizens of Rome came to me, and demonstrated that they had an assembly of their own, according to the laws of their forefathers, and this from the beginning, as also a place of their own, wherein they determined their suits and controversies with one another. Upon their petition therefore to me, that these might be lawful for them, I gave order that their privileges be preserved, and they be permitted to do accordingly." (Ant., XIV:10, 17) It is generally understood that "a place of their own" refers to the synagogue serving the local Jewish community of Sardis. Josephus Flavius also mentions the decree of Caius Norbanus Flaccus, a Roman proconsul during the reign of Augustus at the end of the 1st century BC, who confirms the religious rights of the Jews of Sardis, including the right to send money to the Temple of Jerusalem. (Ant., XVI:6,6)
- Priene Synagogue, was found in the ancient city of Priene in Ionia.

=== Australia ===
- The Hobart Synagogue (1845), in Hobart, Tasmania, is the oldest surviving synagogue building in Australia.
- The Melbourne Hebrew Congregation is the oldest congregation. Its synagogue was built in 1847 and at its current location was built in 1930.
- Ballarat Synagogue (1861), in Ballarat East, Victoria, is the oldest surviving synagogue on Australia's mainland.

=== Europe ===
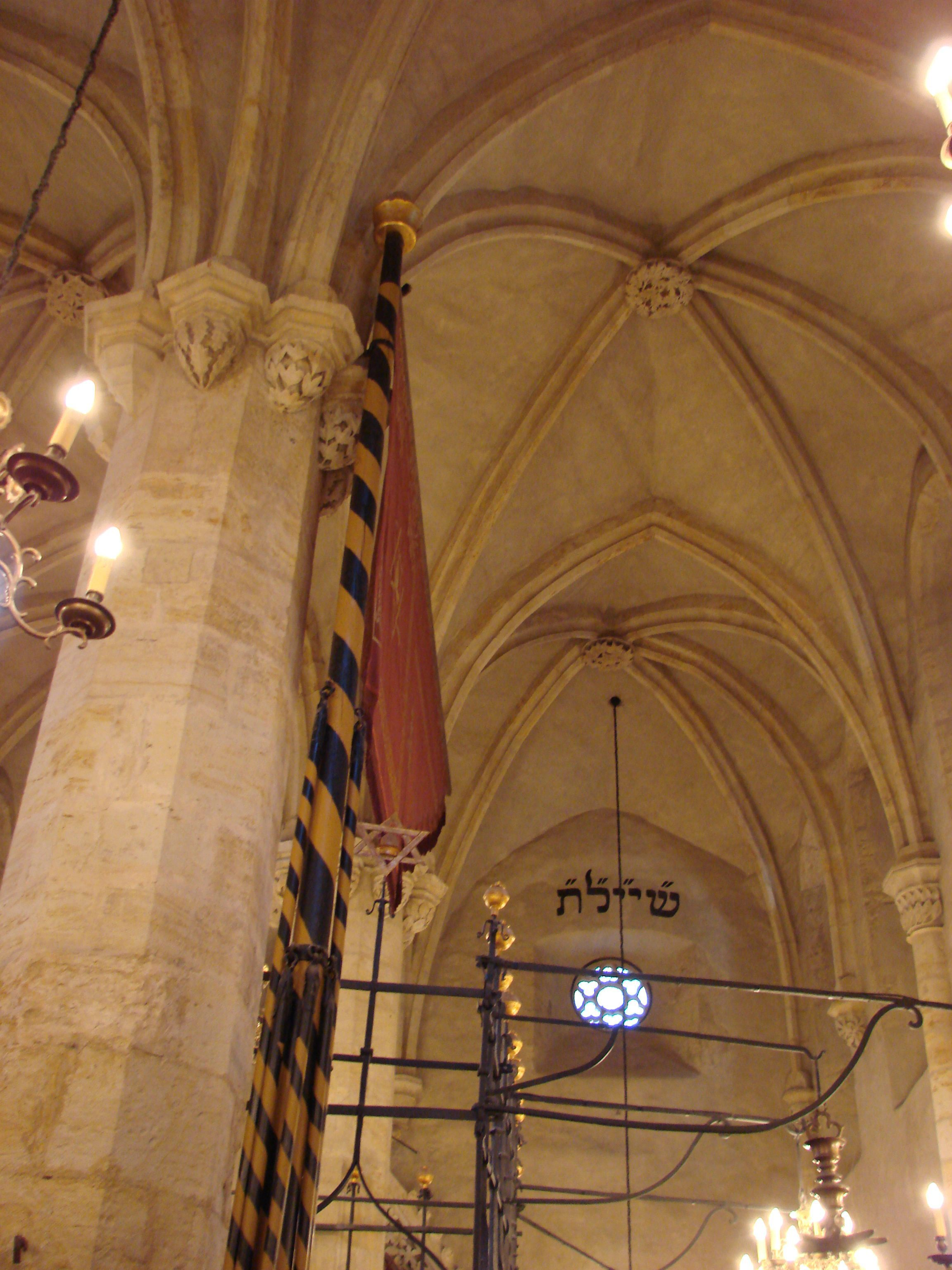
Interior of the 13th-century Old New Synagogue of Prague. Built around 1270, it is the world's oldest active synagogue.

- The oldest synagogue outside of the Middle East uncovered in an archaeological dig to date is the Ostia Synagogue in the ancient Roman port of Ostia, in Italy. The present building, of which partial walls and pillars set upright by archaeologists remain, dates from the 4th century. However, excavation revealed that it is on the site of an earlier building dating from the middle of the 1st century AD, that is, from before the destruction of the Second Temple. Its use as a synagogue is confirmed from at least the 2nd century AD.
- Another 1st century synagogue was discovered in Phanagoria, now in Russia.
- The Ancient Synagogue of Barcelona, is a building from the 3rd or 4th century, when its function is unknown, and extended in the 13th, perhaps marking the start of its use as a synagogue. It has been described as the oldest synagogue in Europe. It was used as a synagogue until the massacre of the Jews in Barcelona in 1391, then used for other purposes until it was rediscovered and restored in the 1990s.
- The Köln Mediaeval Synagogue in Cologne, Germany has been excavated 2007/2012 and dates clearly pre-Carolingian (before 780/790). There is at the moment some strong evidence that it dates back to the early 4th century when emperor Constantine in 321 issued a privilege for the Cologne Jews. This has been confirmed recently by the find of the Cologne Mikvah, a rainwater mikveh of the 4th century, inside the building complex.
- The Old Synagogue in Erfurt, Germany, which was partly built c. 1100, is thought by some experts to be one of the oldest synagogue buildings still standing in Europe (most of it is 13th/14th century). It has been used as museum of Jewish history since 2009.
- Santa María la Blanca, built in Toledo, Spain, in 1190, has long been regarded as the oldest synagogue building in Europe still standing. It was consecrated as a church upon the expulsion of the Jews from Spain in the 15th century, but no major renovations were done. While still a consecrated church, it is no longer used for worship and is open as a museum.
- The oldest active synagogue building in Europe is the Alteneu Shul in Prague, Czechia, which dates from the 13th century (probably 1270). The Altneu Shul was the pulpit of the great Rabbi Yehuda Loew, (the Maharal), and his creation, the Golem of Prague, is rumored to be hidden within the synagogue.
- The Plymouth Synagogue of 1762, in Plymouth, England, is the oldest synagogue built by Ashkenazi Jews in the English-speaking world.

==== Albania ====
- Albania's recent Synagogue was built around 1500 in Vlorë (in Italian, Valona) by a community of 609 Sephardic Jewish Families fleeing the Spanish and Portuguese Inquisitions. The Vlorë Synagogue was destroyed during World War I and not rebuilt. Of historic note, in 1675, the Messianic pretender Sabbatai Zevi died in exile at Ulcinj, Montenegro, a nearby town without a Jewish population.

==== Austria ====
- The "Synagogue of St Stephens Parish" was built in Vienna around 1204; The first Jews lived in the area near the Seitenstettengasse; from around 1280, they also lived around the modern-day Judenplatz where they built another Synagogue at Judenplatz around the same time. The center of Jewish cultural and religious life was located in this area of Vienna from the 13th to the 15th century, until the Vienna Gesera of 1420/21, when Albert V ordered the annihilation of the city's Jews. Proof exists of a Jewish presence in Vienna since 1194. The first named individual was Schlom, Duke Frederick I's Münzmeister (transl. master of the mint).
- The Korneuburg Synagogue was built in the early 1300s for the Jewish community of Korneuburg, a market town some 15 kilometres (9.3 mi) upriver from Vienna. Local Church authorities destroyed the previous synagogue after the Host Desecration of 1298 (the resulting pogrom saw 10 Jews burned alive). A clerical investigation revealed the Desecration accusation lacked evidence and was the result of an unlawful conspiracy. Moreover, local church authorities benefitted from the seizure of the murdered Jews property; notably St Augustine's Monastery was built on the site of the former synagogue, where it stands to this day.
- Some 100 metres (330 ft) northeast of the town square, the Rossmuehl Synagogue served Korneuburg's Jewish community until the expulsion of 1420. The property was converted to storage and various plans have been put forth to renovate the structure, and the Austrian Jewish Community (IKG) has shown no interest in assisting local groups and government agencies in the preservation of the structure, which is one of the oldest synagogues in Europe.

==== Belarus ====
- The Great Synagogue of Hrodna was built from 1576 to 1580 by Santi Gucci, who designed a Wooden synagogue at Rabbi Mordechai Yaffe's invitation.
- The Bychaŭ Synagogue was built in Bychaŭ at the beginning of the 17th century.

==== Belgium ====
- The Arlon Synagogue, in Arlon, was the first synagogue in modern Belgium, built between 1863 and 1865.

==== Bosnia and Herzegovina ====
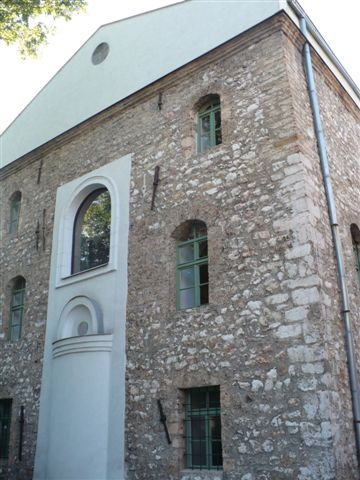
Sarajevo Sephardic Old Synagogue built in 1587

- The Old Synagogue in Sarajevo, also known as "Il cal grande esnoga", a Sephardic synagogue in the Jewish Quarter known as "el Cortijo", was built in 1587. The first Sephardim to arrive in Sarajevo arrived in 1565 during the Spanish Inquisition.

==== Bulgaria ====
- The ancient Synagogue of Philippopolis religious building built in the city of Philippopolis (now Plovdiv, Bulgaria) in the 3rd century AD. The synagogue is the only ancient Jewish temple found in Bulgaria.

==== Croatia ====
- The Dubrovnik Synagogue in Dubrovnik. It is said to have been established in 1352, but gained legal status in the city in 1408. Owned by the local Jewish community, the main floor still functions as a place of worship for Holy days and special occasions, but is now mainly a city museum which hosts numerous Jewish ritual items and centuries-old artifacts.
- The Split Synagogue was built in roughly 1500. Located on Židovski Prolaz, or "the Jewish Passage", is the second oldest continuously operational Sephardic Synagogue in the world. It was built into the western wall of Diocletian's palace by Jews escaping the Inquisition in Spain and Portugal. In 1573, a Jewish cemetery was approved and built on Marjan Hill, which overlooks the city of Split. Jews arrived in Dalmatia, during the early centuries of the Christian era, with the conquering Roman armies. Romans established the city of Salona just behind Split, in the 1st century, where Jewish traders and craftsmen settled. Archaeological excavations have discovered artifacts of Jewish origin dating from this period and clues to the existence of a Synagogue dating back to the time of Diocletian who was Roman Emperor from 284 to 305.

==== Czech Republic ====
- The Alteneu Shul (see above), in Prague which dates from the 13th century (probably 1270), is the oldest active synagogue building in Europe.

==== Denmark ====
- The Great Synagogue in Copenhagen was built in 1833.

==== France ====
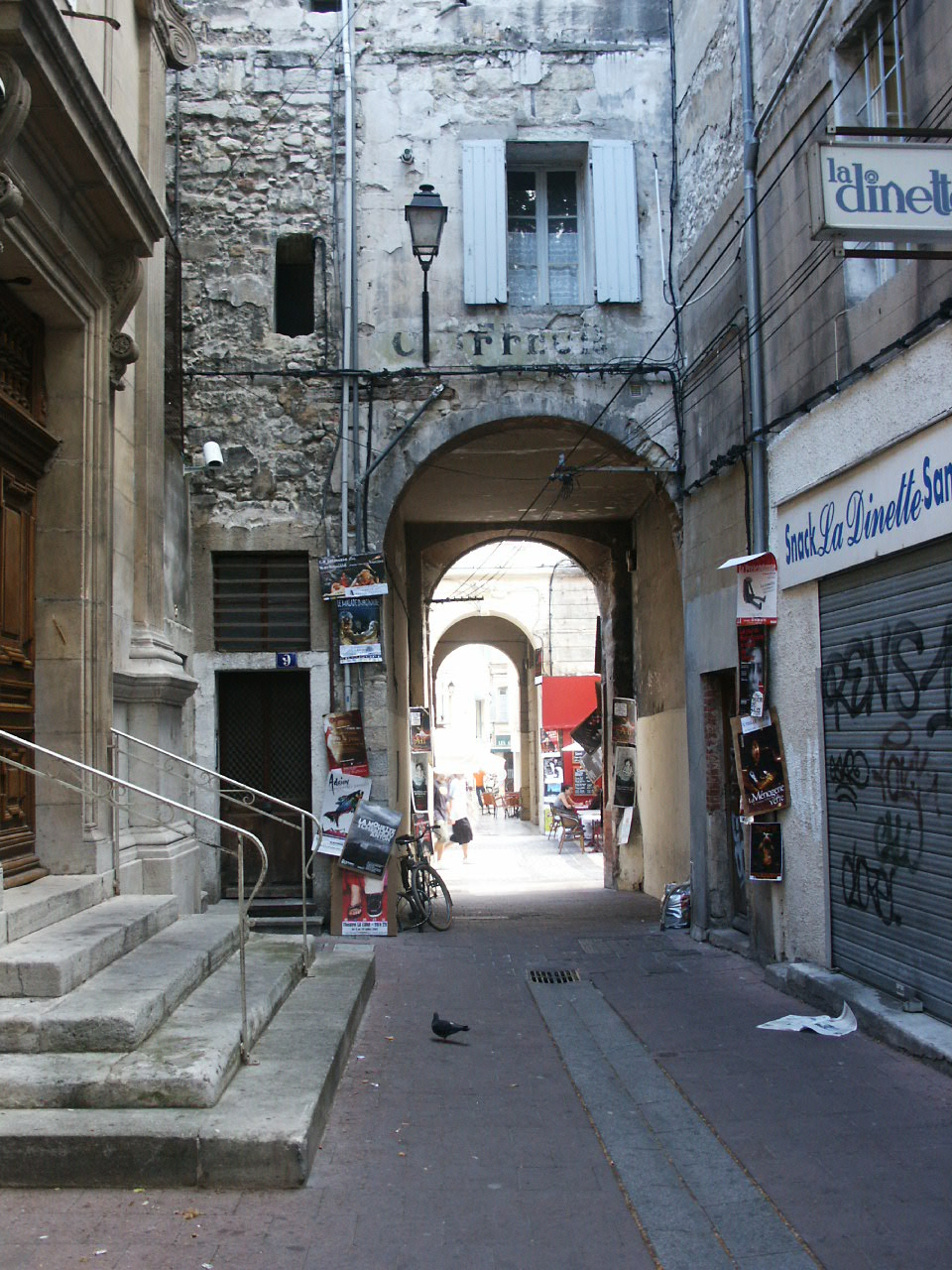
Entrance to the synagogue and gateway to the old ghetto in Avignon

- The Synagogue of Carpentras was built in 1367. Today, only the underground parts (mikveh, bakery, butcher) remain, as the synagogue was rebuilt in the 18th century. The current façade is from 1909.
- The Synagogue of Lunéville, built in 1786.
- Synagogue of Avignon was built in 1846 on the site of a former synagogue from 1221. In 1221, the Jewish community was transferred to an enclosed quarter in the parish of Saint-Pierre, around the Place Jerusalem. The Jewish ghetto was closed off by three doors (the only one of which remaining is the portal of the Calandre) and the inhabitants were under the protection of the pope. The Synagogue was built just after the move in 1221. The Jewish Quarter was originally northwest of the Place du Palais but was moved due to burnings and harassment.
- The Synagogue of Nancy. There was a Jewish community in the city in the Middle Ages. This synagogue was built between 1788 and 1861, its façade dates from 1935.

==== Germany ====
- The Köln Synagogue (see above), in Cologne, Germany, excavated in 2007/2012, dates from pre-Carolingian times (before 780/90) most likely in the first half of the 4th century.
- The Old Synagogue (see above), in Erfurt, Germany, which was partly built c. 1100, mostly 13th and 14th century, is thought by some experts to be one of the oldest synagogue building still standing in Europe.
- The Worms Synagogue, also known as Rashi Shul, is an 11th-century synagogue located in Worms, Germany.

==== Greece ====
- The Delos Synagogue, a Samaritan synagogue on the island of Delos, if proven to be a synagogue, would be the oldest synagogue known outside the Middle East, dates from at 150–128 BC, or earlier.
- The Kahal Shalom Synagogue on Rhodes (1577) is the oldest surviving synagogue building in Greece.
- The Etz Hayyim Synagogue in Chania, Crete, circa 586 BC, when the First Temple was destroyed.

==== Hungary ====
- In Sopron, the two oldest synagogues are the Old Synagogue of Sopron (which dates to the early 14th century) and the Orthodox Synagogue of Sopron
- In Buda Castle lie the remains of three medieval synagogues: the Small Buda Castle Synagogue (built in 1364, it belonged to the Sephardi community of Buda; it was reconsecrated 6 September 2018 and presently has an active congregation), the Grand Buda Castle Synagogue (built in 1461, it belonged to the Ashkenazi community of Buda), and the Old Buda Castle Synagogue (built before 1306, it also belonged to the Ashkenazi community of Buda). Of the three, only the Small Buda Castle Synagogue is accessible as of 2018, although excavations of the Grand Buda Castle Synagogue commenced in 2020, with a view to reconstructing it.
- The Óbuda Synagogue in Budapest, built in 1820, is the oldest synagogue in Hungary still in use.

==== Ireland ====
- Ireland's oldest active synagogue is Terenure Synagogue, Dublin, built in 1953.
- The synagogue at 37 Adelaide Road, Dublin, opened in 1892 and closed in 1999.
- A synagogue existed on Crane Lane, Dublin, in 1700 and may have been established as early as the 1660s.

==== Italy ====
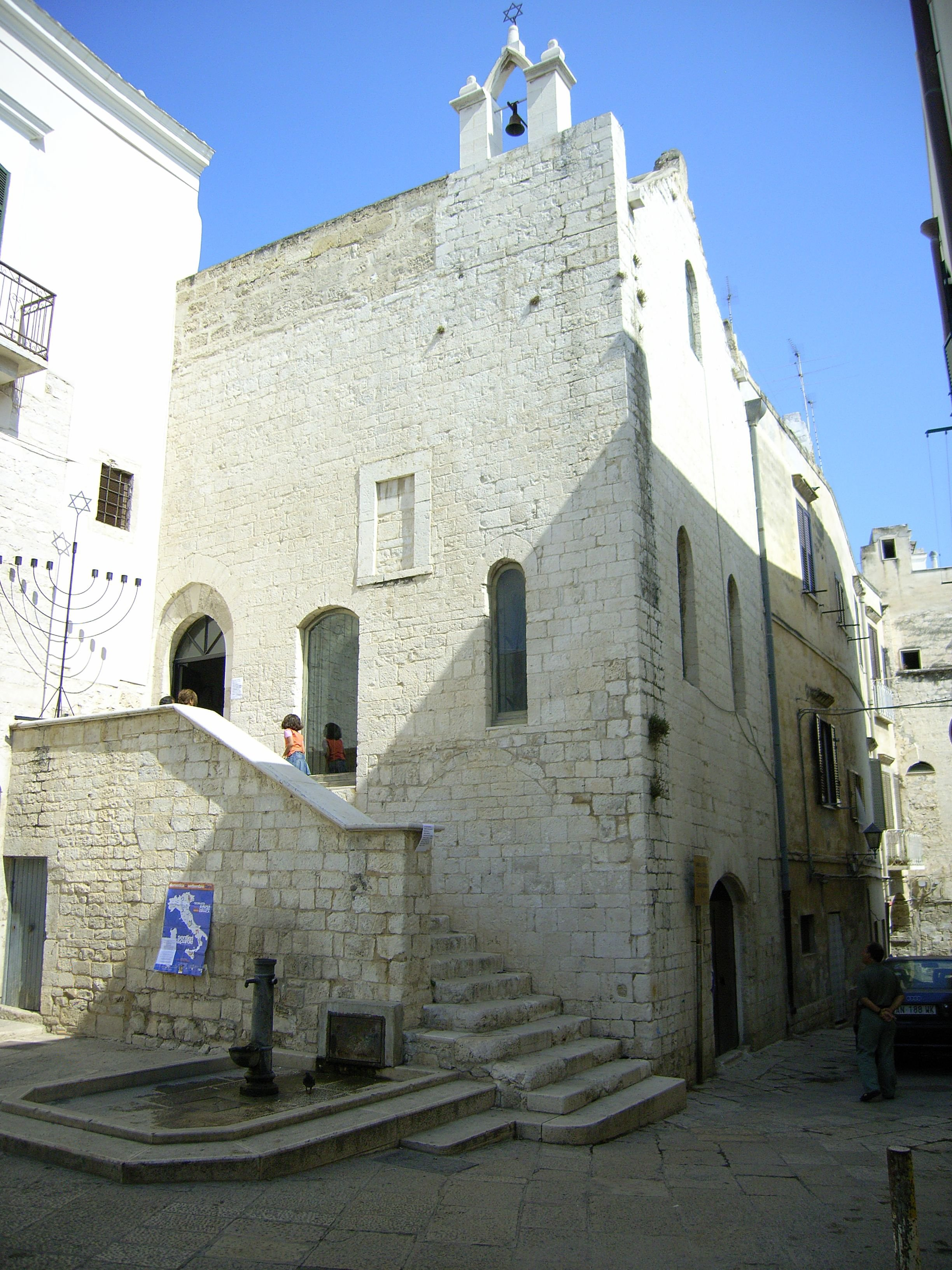
The Scolanova Synagogue, Trani, Italy, built around 1200

- The Ostia Synagogue (see above), in the ancient Roman port of Ostia, is the oldest synagogue site outside the Middle East, dates from the 1st century AD, with use as a synagogue proven from the 2nd century.
- The Bova Marina Synagogue site in Bova Marina, Calabria. This site was discovered 1983. The remains of this ancient synagogue has been dated to the 4th century.
- The Scolanova Synagogue, Trani, built around 1200 and seized by the Roman Catholic Church and converted into a church in 1380. In 2006 it was once more rededicated as a synagogue.
- The Ferrara Synagogue built in 1421. The last surviving synagogue in the Ferrara region of Italy.
- The Spanish Synagogue located in the Venetian Ghetto of Venice. Founded in the 1490s by Spanish Jews.
- The Italian Synagogue located in the Venetian Ghetto of Venice. Founded in 1575.
- The Padua Synagogue located in Padua and built in 1584.
- The Synagogue of Casale Monferrato built in 1595 in Piedmont.

==== Netherlands ====
- The Portuguese Synagogue, on December 12, 1670, the Sephardic Jewish community of Amsterdam acquired the site to build a synagogue and construction work began on April 17, 1671, under architect Elias Bouwman. On August 2, 1675, the Esnoga was finished.

==== North Macedonia ====
- The Polycharmos Synagogue, of Stobi, was discovered in 1974; it was adjacent to a Christian church. The synagogue site, itself, has an archaeological record of two older synagogues under the foundation of the Polycharmos Synagogue dating to the 4th century BC.
- The Bet Aharon Synagogue was built in 1366 then later renamed to "Kahal Kadosh D'Abasho" with the arrival of Sephardic Jews who displaced indigenous Romaniote Jews of the area. The Jewish community of Skopje outnumbered the non-Jewish community by 1566.
- The Sephardi Bet Yaʿaqov Synagogue was built in the early 1900s then renamed "Qahal Qadosh de Ariba" (meaning 'congregation on the mountaintop').

==== Norway ====
- The Trondheim Synagogue, Trondheim 1899, moved to new building 1925
- The Oslo Synagogue, Oslo 1920
- The Israelite Synagogue, Oslo 1921, closed after World War II, congregation moved to Oslo synagogue

==== Poland ====
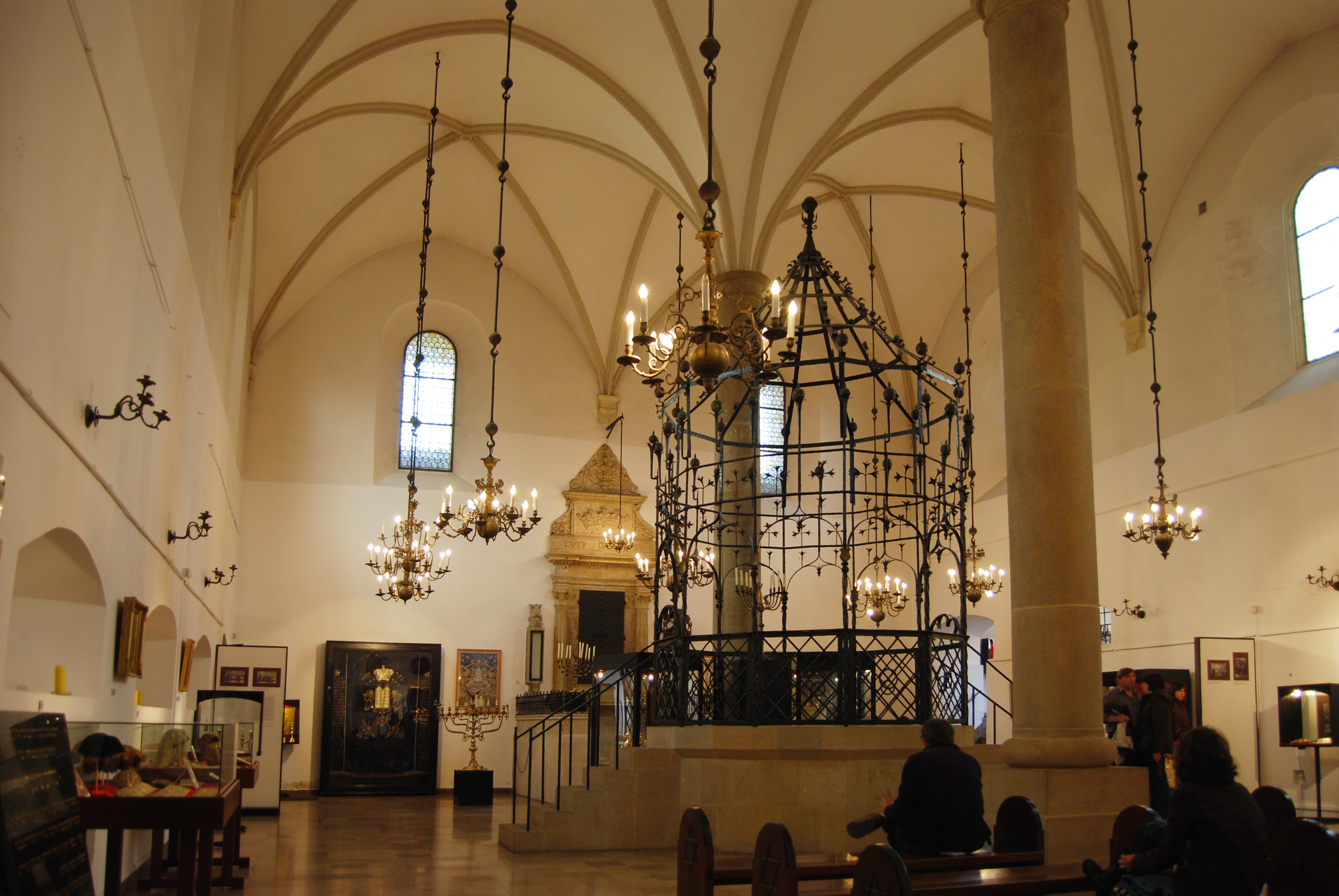
Inside of the Old Synagogue, Kraków

- Old Synagogue in Kraków is from the 15th century and the oldest surviving synagogue building in Poland. The synagogue was built in 1407 or 1492; the date of building varies throughout sources.
- High Synagogue in Kraków, built in 1556−1563
- Remuh Synagogue, completed in 1557
- Zamość Synagogue, built between 1610 and 1618
- Wolf Popper Synagogue, founded in 1620
- Tykocin Synagogue, built in 1642
- Lesko Synagogue, built in 1626−1654
- Kupa Synagogue, founded in 1643
- Izaak Synagogue, built in 1644
- Włodawa Synagogue, built between 1764 and 1774
- Great Synagogue in Piotrków Trybunalski, built between 1791 and 1793
- Tempel Synagogue, the newest in Kraków, completed in 1862

==== Portugal ====
- The Synagogue of Óbidos is located in the old Jewish Quarter and dates to the 7th century where a Jewish community was re-established after the Visigoths seized the village in the 5th century. Óbidos was liberated in 1148, by the Jewish vizier, Yaish ibn Yahya; in return for its liberation King Afonso I Henriques rewarded Yaish ibn Yahya with a nearby town and anointed him "Lord of Unhos, Frielas and Aldeia dos Negros".
- The Synagogue of Tomar is located in the historic centre of the city of Tomar, and houses a small Jewish museum. The synagogue of Tomar was built in 1460 by the thriving Jewish community of the town. Today, the museum holds Judaica, fine art, several medieval Jewish gravestones, important architectural fragments from other buildings, including an inscribed stone from 1307 believed to have come from the Lisbon Great Synagogue (destroyed in the earthquake of 1755) and a 13th-century inscribed stone from the medieval synagogue in Belmonte.

==== Romania ====
- The 1671 Great Synagogue in Iaşi is the oldest surviving synagogue in Romania.

==== Russia ====
- The Phanagoria synagogue, located just east of modern Crimea, operated from the late Second Temple period (1st century) until the 6th century.
- Grand Choral Synagogue in St. Petersburg was begun in 1880 and completed in 1888.
- Volgograd Synagogue was built in 1898.
- Moscow Choral Synagogue, completed in 1906, is the oldest synagogue in Moscow.

==== Slovenia ====
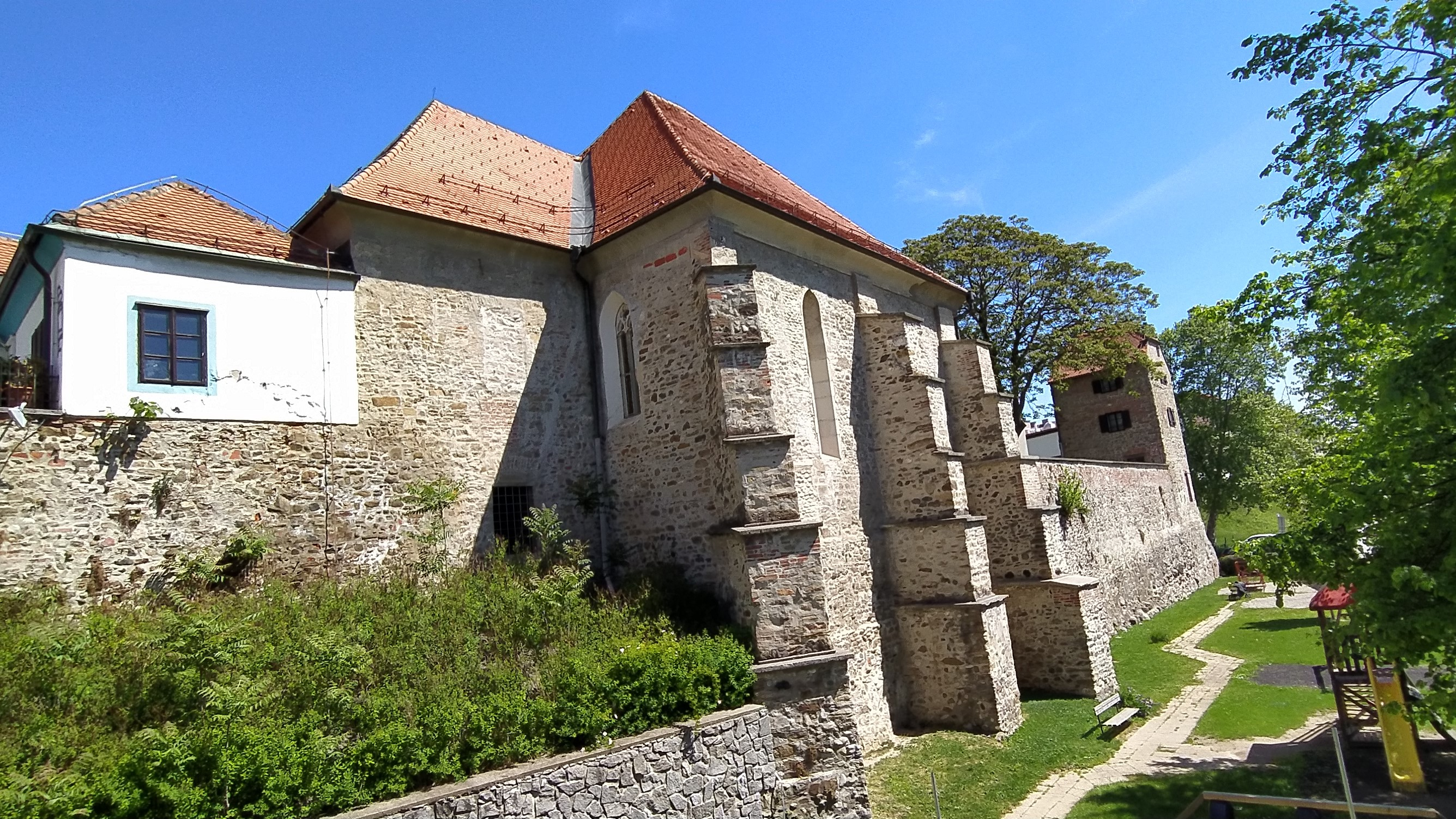
The Maribor Synagogue was built into the city walls.

- The Maribor Synagogue (originally the Judenschul in Marburg), first mentioned in 1354, was built around 1300. Located in the former Jewish district of the town at Židovska ulica 4, it is among the oldest surviving medieval synagogues in Europe. The first documented evidence of a Jewish presence in present-day Slovenia dates to the 13th century when Yiddish and Italian-speaking Jews migrated south from present-day Austria. The Marburg Synagogue remained in use until 1497 when the Jews were expelled from the city, and the building was converted to a church.

==== Spain ====
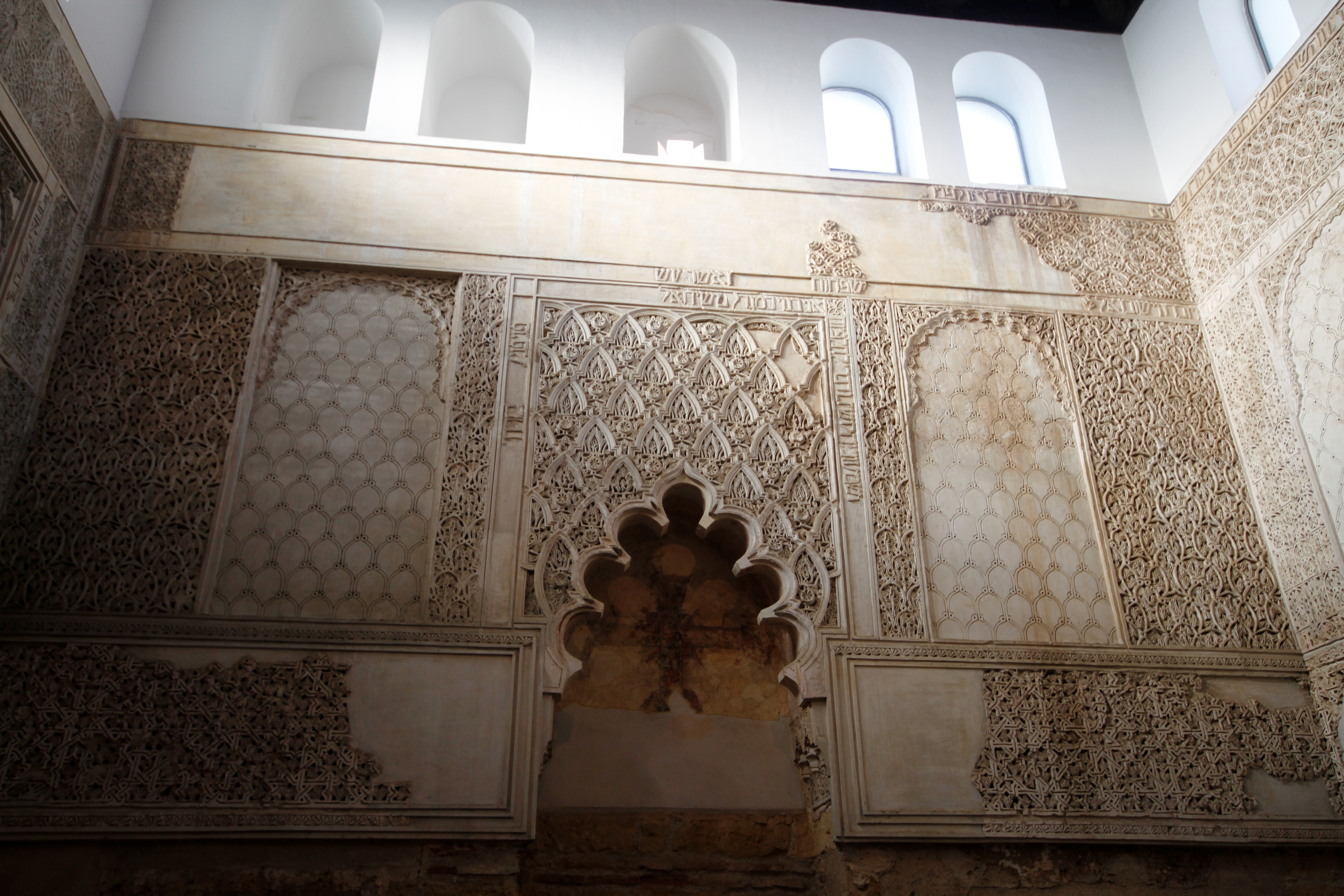
14th-century Córdoba Synagogue

- The Main Synagogue of Barcelona, the building was started to be built in the 3rd or 4th century, although there is no certainty of the date when it began to be a synagogue. It could be the oldest synagogue in Europe.
- Santa María la Blanca (see above), built in Toledo in 1180, has long been regarded as the oldest synagogue building in Europe still standing.
- Synagogue of Córdoba, built in 1305, located in the Jewish Quarter of Córdoba
- Synagogue of El Transito, built in Toledo in 1356, founded by Samuel ha-Levi Abulafia, the Treasurer to Peter of Castile.
- Synagogue of Híjar, built in Híjar (in Aragon). It pre-dates the expulsion of the Jews from Spain in 1492, and later was used as a church, although its Jewish architecture remains intact.

==== Sweden ====
- The first synagogue in Sweden was constructed in the fortress of the Free Port of Marstrand in the 1780 by Jews who had come from Hamburg. The free port status allowed freedom of worship independent from the control of the Church of Sweden. The synagogue is the earliest known synagogue in Scandinavia. After the closure of the free port, the Jewish community relocated to the nearby city of Gothenburg.

==== Ukraine ====
- Golden Rose Synagogue (Lviv), 1582, a standing ruin as of 2009.
- Golden Rose Synagogue (Dnipropetrovsk), originally constructed in the late 1850s, restored in 1999.

==== United Kingdom ====
- Jew's Court, Lincoln, has been claimed as an early synagogue, but it is very unlikely that any of the building is earlier than the 15th or 16th centuries. It has always been used for domestic or commercial purposes.
- A more likely candidate for the oldest synagogue on the British Isles is the mediaeval Guildford Synagogue, which dates to c. 1180. Another likely candidate is the Northampton Medieval Synagogue, built sometime prior to the Edict of Expulsion.
- The oldest confirmed synagogue in England is the First Great Synagogue of London, which was destroyed in 1272.
- The Second Great Synagogue of London, built c. 1690, it was destroyed during the Blitz.
- Bevis Marks Synagogue in London, built in 1701, is the oldest synagogue building in the United Kingdom still in use.
- The Plymouth Synagogue (see above), built in 1762, is the oldest surviving Ashkenazi synagogue in continuous use in the English-speaking world.
- The Annesley Street Synagogue (1904), in Belfast, is the oldest standing synagogue in what is now Northern Ireland; it closed in 1965. The first synagogue in present-day Northern Ireland was also in Belfast, Great Victoria Street synagogue, built in 1870.
- Garnethill Synagogue, built 1879–1881, is the oldest synagogue in Scotland.
- The Merthyr Synagogue, built in 1877, is the oldest purpose-built synagogue in Wales.

=== North America ===
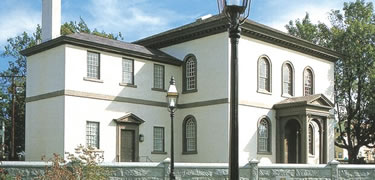
Touro Synagogue, Newport, Rhode Island, completed in 1763

- The Touro Synagogue in Newport, Rhode Island, is the oldest Jewish house of worship in North America that is still standing. It was built in 1763 for the Jeshuat Israel congregation, which was established by Sephardim (Spanish and Portuguese speaking Jews) in 1658.

==== Canada ====
- The Spanish and Portuguese Synagogue of Montreal is the oldest congregation in Canada.
- The 1863 building of Congregation Emanu-El (Victoria, British Columbia) may be the oldest synagogue building in Canada.

==== United States ====
- Congregation Shearith Israel in New York City, 1654, is the oldest congregation in the United States, although its present building dates from 1897.
- Touro Synagogue in Newport, Rhode Island, the building of which commenced in 1759, is the United States' oldest synagogue and began services in the current building in the year 1763; the congregation was founded in 1658.
- Congregation Talmud Torah Adereth El (located on East 29th Street in Manhattan) has been operating services from that location since 1863. The congregation was founded in 1857. It has the distinction of being the oldest synagogue in New York running services from the same location.
- Congregation Mickve Israel of Savannah, Georgia, was organized in 1733 by Sephardic Jews. The current 1878 Neo-Gothic building is unique in its cross-shaped floor plan.
- Congregation Kahal Kadosh Beth Elohim in Charleston, South Carolina, was founded in 1749 and is the oldest synagogue in continuous use in the United States. The present building dates to 1840 and was constructed after the original structure was destroyed in the fire of 1838.

=== South America and Caribbean ===
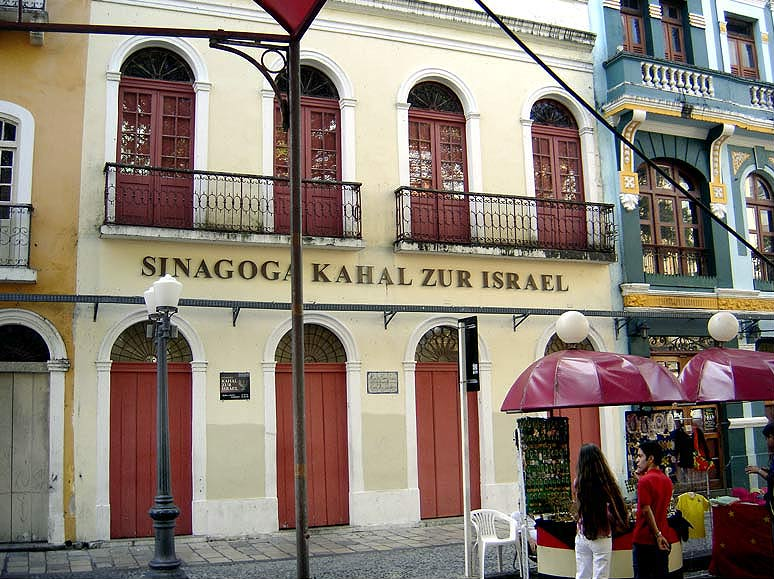
The Kahal Zur Israel Synagogue, located in Recife stands on the site of the earliest synagogue in the Americas.

==== Argentina ====
- Synagogue in Aldea San Gregorio, Entre Ríos. Built in 1893, today abandoned.

==== Barbados ====
- Nidhe Israel Synagogue in Bridgetown, Barbados: one of the oldest synagogues in the Americas, originally built 1654, destroyed by hurricane of 1831, rebuilt and restored and used by the Jewish community in Barbados to this day.

==== Brazil ====
- The Kahal Zur Israel Synagogue in Recife, Brazil, erected in 1636, was the first synagogue erected in the Americas. Its foundations have been recently discovered, and the 20th-century buildings on the site have been altered to resemble a 17th-century Dutch synagogue.

==== Cuba ====
- Beth Shalom Temple was constructed in 1953 and was the first synagogue in Cuba. Although the majority of the community fled after the Cuban Revolution, the synagogue has become a relic to the past Cuban Jewish history and one of the holiest sites in all of Latin America. Nicknamed "El Patronato", thousands of visitors come yearly to learn about its history and importance in Judaism.

==== Curaçao ====
- The Jewish community in Curaçao was founded in 1659. The Curaçao synagogue, congregation Mikvé Israel-Emanuel, built in 1732. It is the oldest synagogue still in use today in the Americas. When Jews were expelled from the French islands of Martinique and Guadeloupe the number of Jews in Curaçao increased and by 1780 reached 2,000, more than half of the white population. The Curaçao community became the "mother community" of the Americas and assisted other communities in the area, mainly in Suriname and St. Eustatius. It also financed the construction of the first synagogues in New York and Newport.

==== Jamaica ====
- The first synagogue, a Sephardic Synagogue, was built in Port Royal in approximately 1646, but was destroyed during the earthquake of 1692. Another Synagogue, Neveh Shalom Synagogue, was established on Spanish Town's Monk Street in 1704, but today lies largely in ruins. The only synagogue still in current use, Shaare Shamayim in Kingston, was built in 1912.

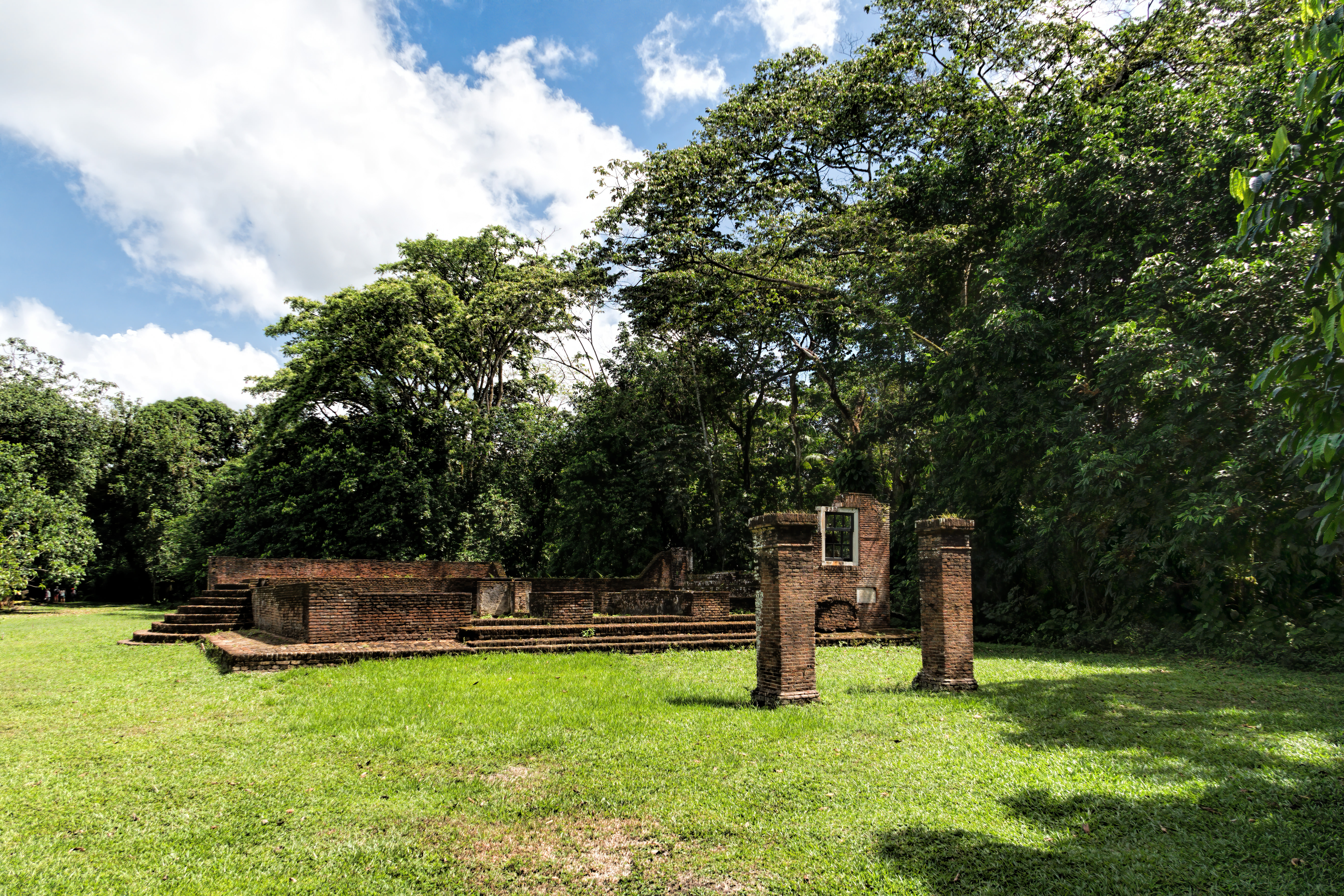
Beracha Ve Shalom in Jodensavanne dating back to the 17th century Dutch Surinam times

==== Suriname ====
- The wooden, later brick, synagogue Beracha ve Shalom ("Blessings and Peace") at Jodensavanne, Suriname, was built between 1665 and 1671. It was destroyed in 1832, though its ruins still exist.
- Neveh Shalom Synagogue, erection first completed in 1723 and rebuilt in 1842 or 1843, is currently the only synagogue in use in Suriname.

==== Sint Eustatius ====
- The Honen Dalim Synagogue, Oranjestad, built in 1739, fallen into ruins after the economy of the island collapsed and the Jews started to leave the island from 1795 to the point where there was no Jewish community left. It was partially restored in 2001.

==== St Thomas – United States Virgin Islands ====
- The St. Thomas Synagogue in the United States Virgin Islands was founded in 1796 by Jews who left St. Eustatius (see above).

==== Venezuela ====
- The Coro Synagogue in Coro, Venezuela is known as one of the oldest synagogues in Latin America. The synagogue was originally a house built in the first half of the XVIII century by the lieutenant governor of Coro Don Francisco Campuzano Polanco as his residence, bought on July 30, 1847, by Mr. David Abraham Senior, a sephardic trader from Curaçao who lived in the city and formed part of the growing Jewish community of the city. Before that, the community used to gather at the house of Mr. David Valencia to pray. It is known that around 20 people gathered there for shabbat and daily prayer services. Isaac Senior, David's son and his descendants continued living in the house and using one of its rooms as a prayer hall, until the 1880s.

== See also ==
- List of oldest church buildings
- List of the oldest mosques
