= Córdoba Synagogue =

Historic synagogue, now a museum, in Andalusia, Spain

- Spanish: Sinagoga de Córdoba
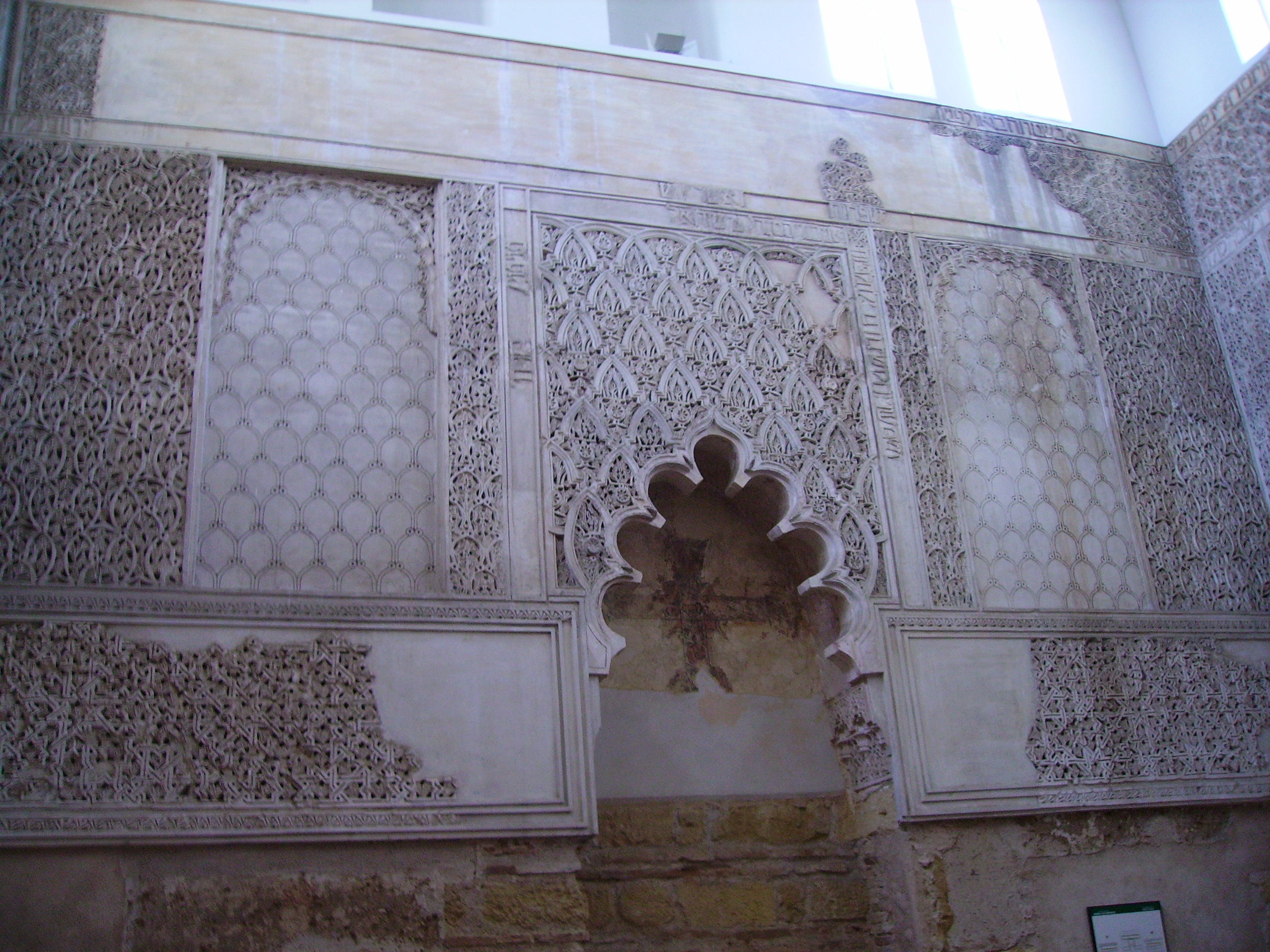

- Location of the former synagogue, now a museum, in Andalusia

Religion
- Affiliation: Judaism (former)
- Rite: Nusach Sefard
- Ecclesiastical or organisational status: Synagogue (1315–1492); Profane use (15th–20th centuries); Jewish museum (since 1985)
- Status: Inactive (as a synagogue); Repurposed

Location
- Location: 20 Calle de los Judíos, Historic centre of Córdoba, Andalusia
- Country: Spain
- Coordinates: 37°52′47″N 4°47′0″W

Architecture
- Architect: Isaac Makheb
- Type: Synagogue architecture
- Style: Mudéjar
- Completed: 1315
- Materials: Stone

Spanish Cultural Heritage
- Official name: Sinagoga (Córdoba)
- Type: Monumento
- Designated: 24 January 1885
- Reference no.: RI-51-0000045

The Córdoba Synagogue (Spanish: Sinagoga de Córdoba) is a historic former Jewish congregation and synagogue located at 20 Calle de los Judíos in the Jewish Quarter of Córdoba, Andalusia. Completed in 1315, with its Mudéjar design attributed to Isaac Makheb, the synagogue's small size points to it possibly being the private synagogue of a wealthy resident. It is also possible that Córdoba's complex of buildings was a yeshiva, kollel, or beth midrash. Another possibility is that it was initially a local trade guild's workroom or a residence before converting to a synagogue.

The building was used as a synagogue until 1492, subsequently used for profane purposes, and restored and reopened in 1985 as a Jewish museum. In 1885, the building was added to the list of monuments of Spanish Cultural Heritage (Spanish: Bien de Interés Cultural).

== History ==
After the expulsion of the Jews in 1492, the synagogue was seized by the authorities and converted into the Hospital Santo Quiteria for people suffering from rabies. In 1588, the building was acquired by the shoemakers’ guild, which used it as a community center and small Christian chapel, changing the patron saint of the building to Santos Crispin-Crispian—the patron saint of shoemakers. It was declared a National Monument in 1885.

Since then, it has undergone several phases of restoration, including that of Felix Hernandez in 1929. In 1935, the Spanish authorities marked the eight-hundredth anniversary of the birth of Maimonides by changing the name of the square in which the synagogue is located to Tiberias Square, honoring the great native-born philosopher buried in Tiberias. At this celebration, the first Jewish prayer service in 443 years, openly and with full knowledge of the authorities, was held at the synagogue. Another restoration was begun in 1977 to reopen the building in 1985 to celebrate the 850th anniversary of Maimonides's birth. It is the only synagogue in Córdoba that escaped destruction during years of persecution. Although no longer functioning as a house of worship, it is open to the public.

== Architecture ==
=== Building restrictions ===
The floor plan of the synagogue, as well as other synagogues of the time period, was greatly affected by the restrictions placed upon synagogue construction by Christian leaders. Restrictions varied depending on the location of the synagogue and whether or not Jews enjoyed a privileged status in that community. The size of the synagogue had to reflect its humility and inferiority to the Catholic church, but it differed from place to place in accordance with the Christian buildings in the area. Sometimes even the king's favor was not sufficient to avoid the troubles that the local clergy could cause. In April 1250, Innocent IV ordered the Bishop of Córdoba to take action against the Jews for building a synagogue of an unacceptable height. Documents from his reign record resentment toward a prominent new congregational synagogue:

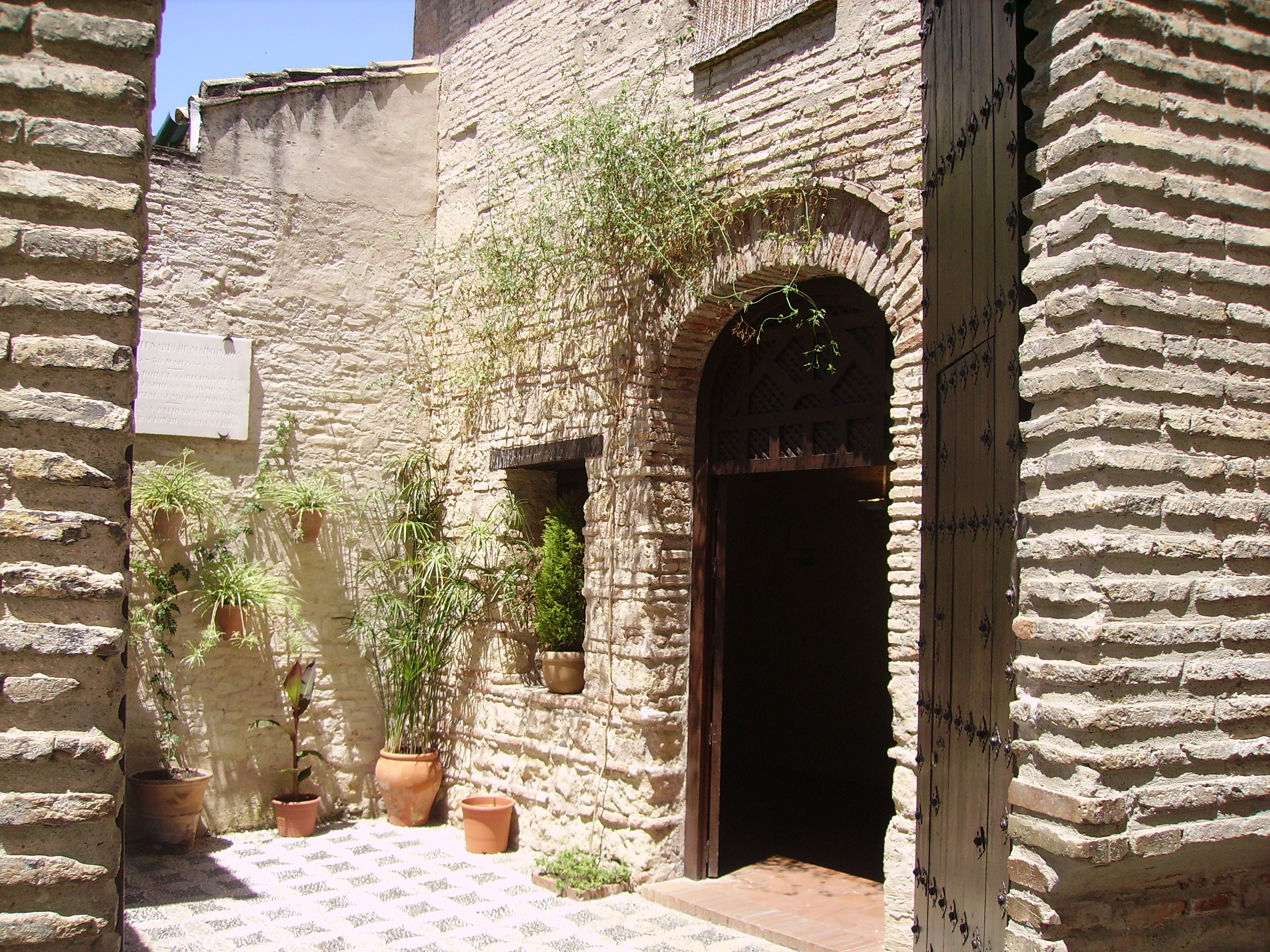
The courtyard of Córdoba Synagogue.

The Jews of Cordoba are rashly presuming to build a new synagogue of unnecessary height thereby scandalizing faithful Christians, wherefore ... we command [you] ... to enforce the authority of your office against the Jews in this regard....

=== Courtyard ===
The Córdoba Synagogue has a gate in the eastern wall that leads into a small courtyard that measures slightly more than twenty-five square meters (270 square feet). The courtyard walls of the synagogue measure 5.5 meters (18 feet) on the northern wall, 5.5 meters on the western wall, however the southern wall is only 3.5 meters (11 feet) long, the eastern wall which contains the gate is the longest at 6 meters (20 feet). This gives the floor plan of Córdoba an unusual trapezoidal footprint. This unusual shape is most likely due to the layout of the surrounding streets, which run at an angle.

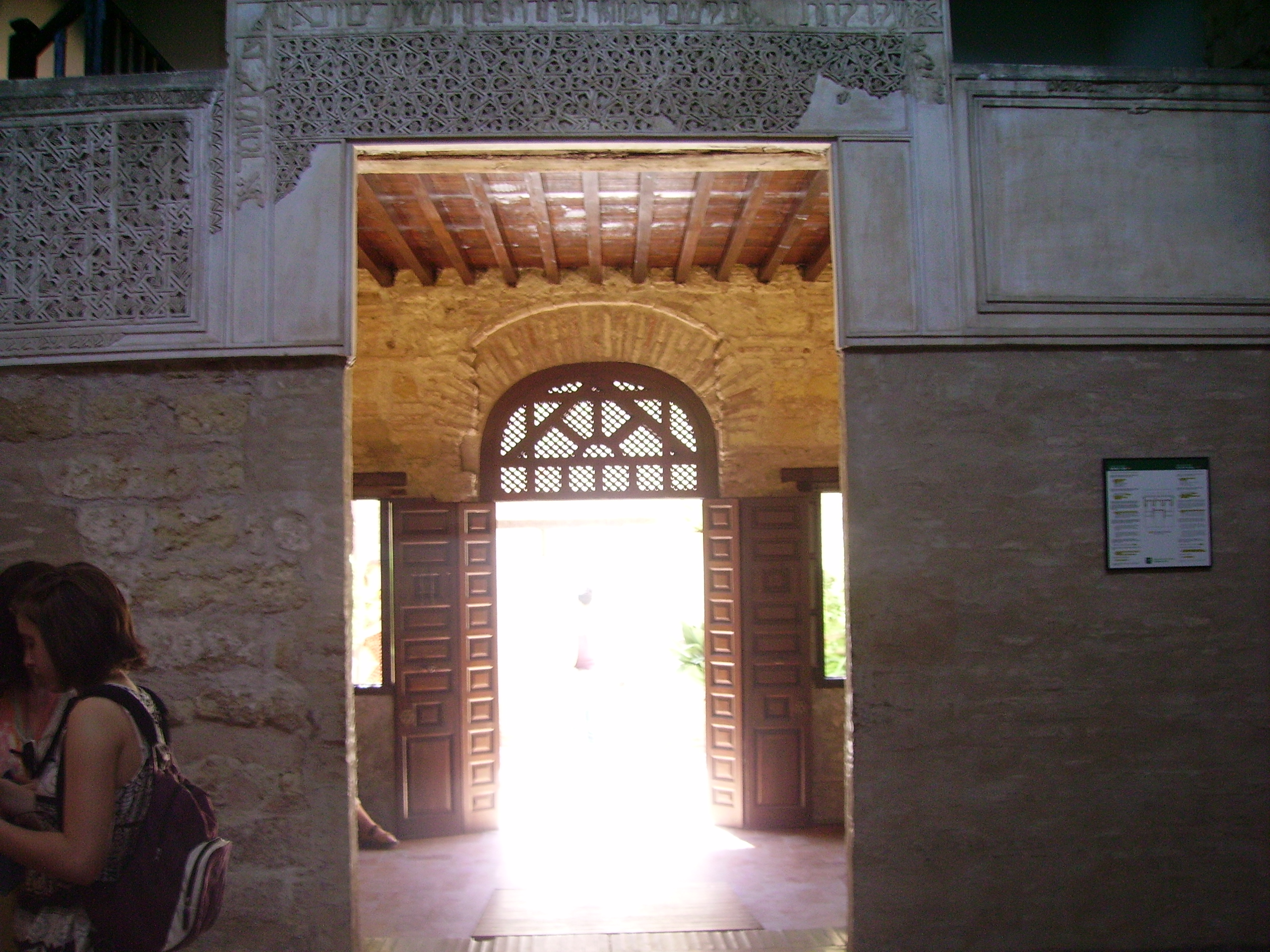
View of Córdoba Synagogue entrance hall, from the prayer hall

=== Entrance hall ===
The entrance to the synagogue, the façade, is located on the northern wall of the courtyard with three openings: a door and two windows on either side. Beyond the facade is the entrance hall that measures 7 meters (23 feet) on the northern wall, 6 meters (20 feet) on the southern wall, a 3 meters (9.8 feet) western wall, and an eastern wall of 3.4 meters (11 feet). This room has a wooden stairwell which leads up to the women's section. This entrance hall functioned both as a cloakroom and a place for the maskilta (water basin for ritual ablutions). The ceiling of the entry hall is made of wood and is 2.3 meters (7.5 feet) high.

=== Prayer hall ===
The prayer hall is the largest room in the synagogue, but even it is small in comparison to most buildings or homes of the period. It is slightly rectangular, measuring 6.5 by 7 meters [21 ft × 23 ft]. It has an extremely high roof in comparison, at 11.5 meters (38 feet) to the top of the gables. The height of the room is notable because it is high even among larger synagogues.

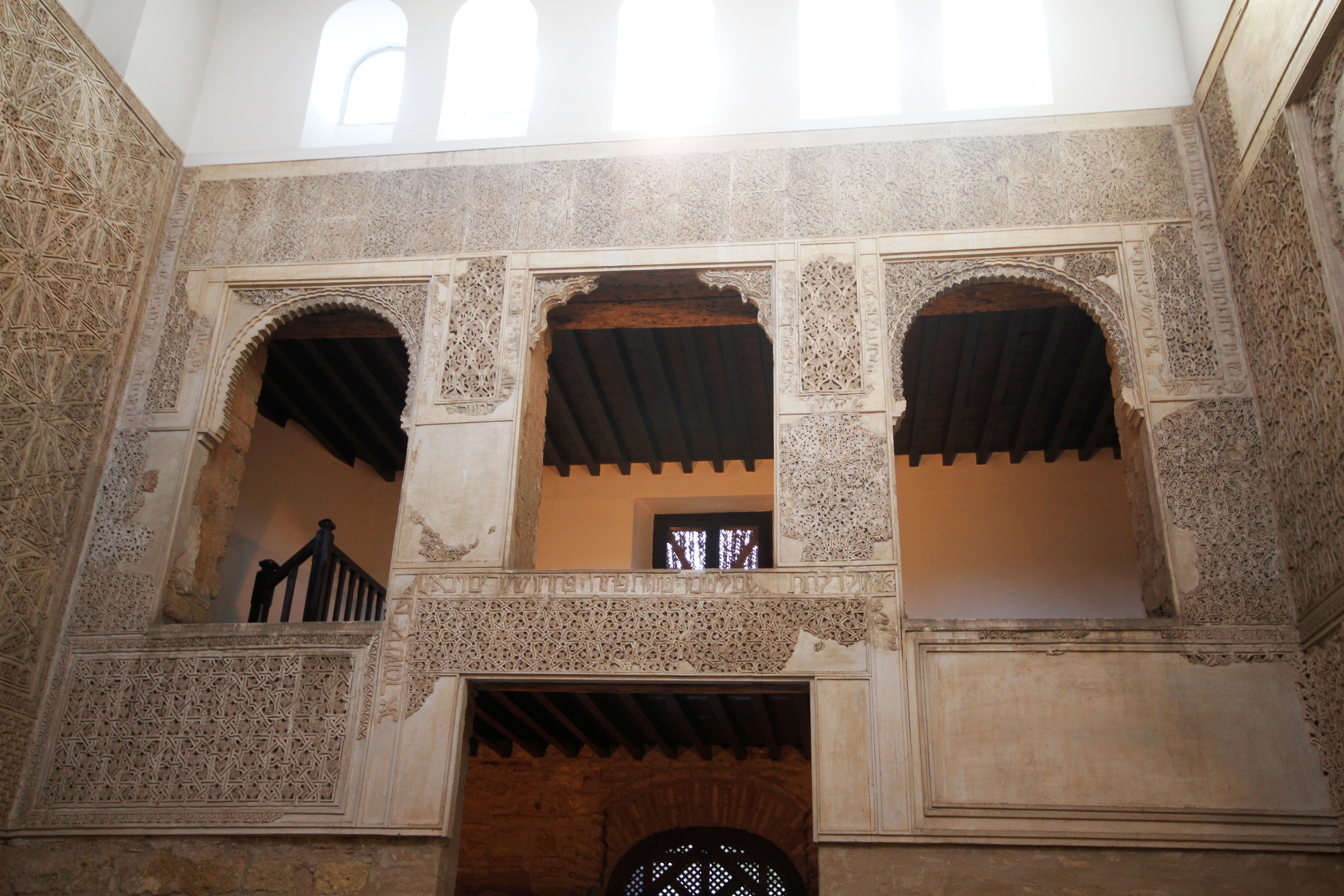
The women's section on the second floor of Córdoba Synagogue. (There was originally latticework acting as a screen in the bottom half of the three arches).

=== Women's section ===
The women's section of the synagogue is in the gallery above the entrance hall; its measurements and layout are identical to those of the entrance hall. It is unclear whether the women's section and the entrance hall were part of the original building. Differences in the structure and height of the roof suggest that this part of structure may have been added later. The women's section features three broad arches that look onto the sanctuary. These arches are decorated with elaborately interwoven stucco and latticework, customary in Sephardic synagogues. The original latticework was either of wood or stucco; it is uncertain which. The three arches are interwoven with elaborate patterns and Hebrew text. The central arch is different than the identical outer arches, having different decoration and being taller in order to accommodate the doorway.

=== Foci of the synagogue ===
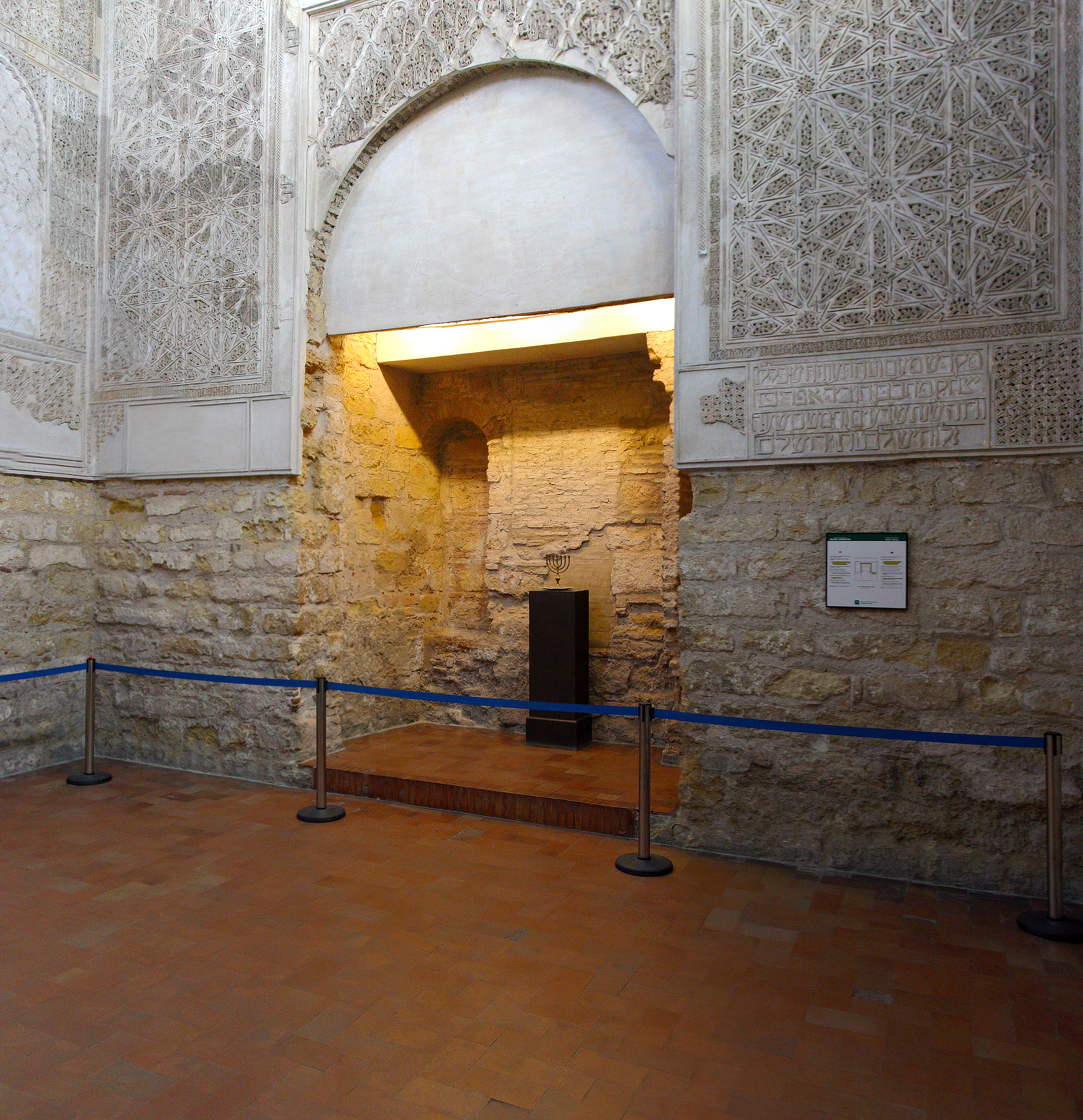
The niche containing the hekhal (Torah ark) on the eastern wall of the synagogue.

The hekhal (ark), where the Torah scrolls were kept, was located on the eastern wall, which was customary. The wall is angled, following the street outside, and was decorated with elaborate stucco in accordance with the Mudejar tradition. One of the Hebrew inscriptions mentions the hekhal, reading "I will bow down before Your Holy hekhal...." The second focus, the bimah (elevated platform), may have been in the center of the room; it has not survived. Benches for the congregants were placed along the walls of the room.

The location of the hekhal was based on directions given by Maimonides in his authoritative legal code, the Mishneh Torah. His Second Book of Love of the Torah, Laws of Prayer, states: "When building a synagogue ... a heikhal should be built to hold a Torah scroll in it. The heikhal should be built in the direction of prayer in that town [towards Jerusalem], so that they [the congregation] should face the heikhal when they pray. And a bimah should be set up in the center of the house, to enable the reader of the Torah or one who admonishes the congregation, to go up to it so that everyone will be able to hear him...."

=== Ceiling and illumination level ===
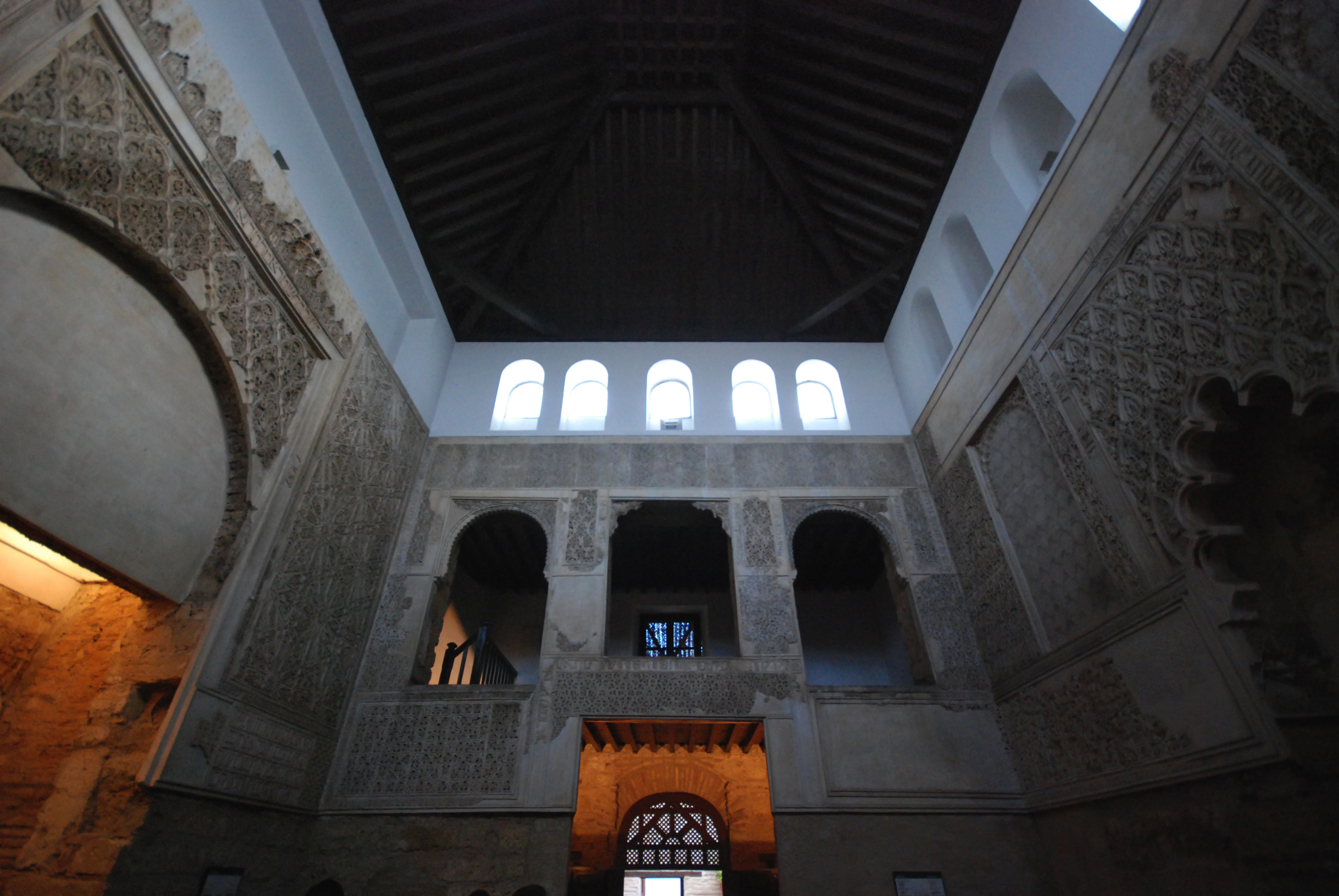
The ceiling and illumination level of Córdoba Synagogue.

The ceiling of the synagogue is made of thin wooden panels above thick beams that hold the ceiling in order to hide the gabled tile roof. The wood panels and beams were richly decorated and worked to add to the building's ornamentation. The ceiling is angled upward in order to give the sanctuary a greater feeling of height common in the architecture of Spanish synagogues. The only floor that receives natural light is the top floor because the synagogue was built in a neighborhood where the houses butted against each other. Three of the upper walls have windows for illumination, five windows for each of three windowed walls. The windows were 0.6 meters (24 inches) wide and 1.5 meters (59 inches) high. The lintels of the windows are classic arch shapes and may have been decorated with latticework at one time.

== Decorations and inscriptions ==
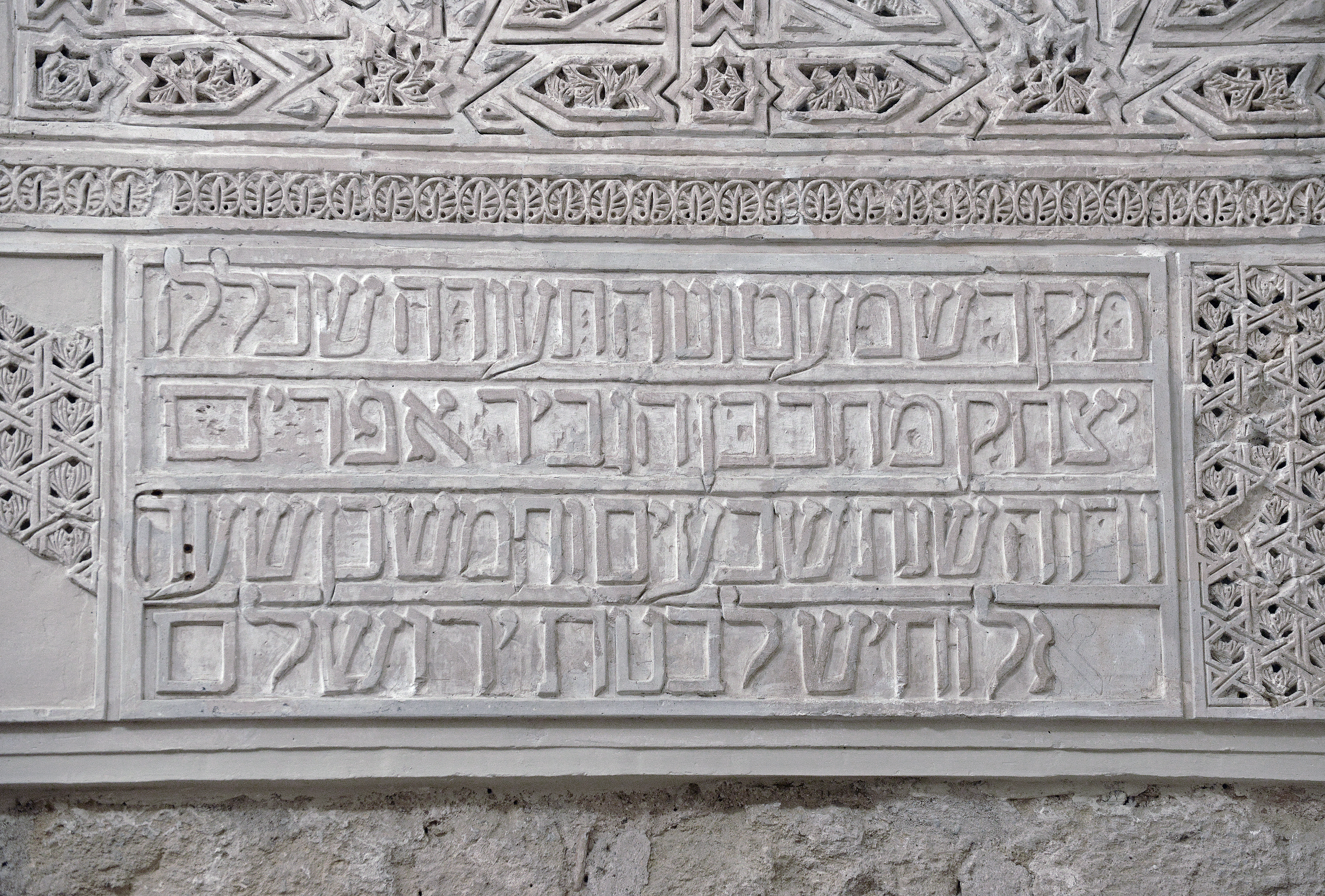
The dedication tablet of the building.

The Córdoba Synagogue was influenced by the Mudejar tradition of stucco panels, stylized geometric patterns, and floral patterns. Hebrew verses in the style of the Ibn Shushan Synagogue of Toledo wrap around the windows, and much as in Toledo the stucco panels used many colors. The inscriptions featured inside the synagogue are mostly from Psalms, other books of the Bible, and piyyutim (liturgical poetry).

One of the inscriptions might give important information on the synagogue's construction, as well as the primary benefactor of the synagogue. A possible reconstruction of the text tells us that "this minor sanctuary's chamber has been refurbished by Yitzhak Mahab, son of the wealthy Ephraim, in the Hebrew year 5075 (1315 C.E.), may God hear my prayers by removing curses from our nation and [helping] rebuild Jerusalem soon." (Note: Loose translation of: מקדש מעט ונוה (ו)תעודה שכלל(ו) יצחק מחב בן (הג)ביר אפרים ו(ב/ד)וה שנת שבעים וחמש כן שעה האל וחיש לבנות ירושלים) The inscription implies that the building was finished in the year 1315 C.E. The hekhal had a decorative band that praised the Temple in Jerusalem and linked the synagogue to it: "I will bow down toward your holy hekhal and praise Your name for Your mercy and Your truth, for You have magnified Your word above all Your name...."(Psalms 138:2).

In the women's section there is a verse in praise of women: "Your neck is like the tower of David built with turrets" (Song of Songs 4:4). There were several verses of longing for Jerusalem: "Pray for the peace of Jerusalem; those who love you shall be blessed. Peace be within your walls, prosperity within your palaces" (Psalms 122:6–7). There were also many verses of pleading: "Be merciful to me, O God, be merciful to me; for my soul trusts in You; in the shadow of Your wings I will take refuge until these great troubles pass by" (Psalms 57:2).

== See also ==
- History of the Jews in Spain
- List of synagogues in Spain
- Oldest synagogues in the world
