= Ostia Synagogue =

Ancient synagogue in Rome, Italy

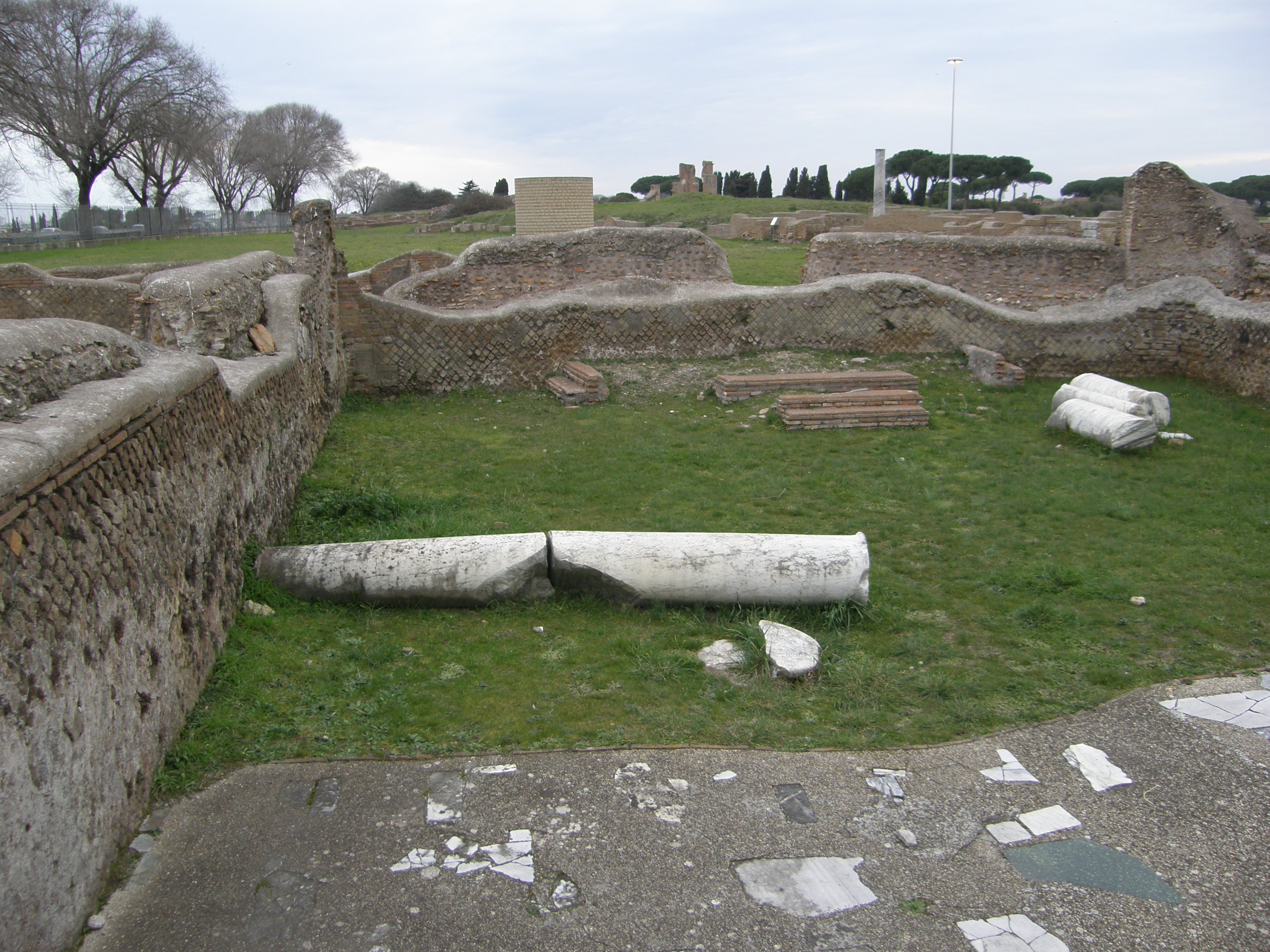
- The cult hall with the bimah in the background along the wall

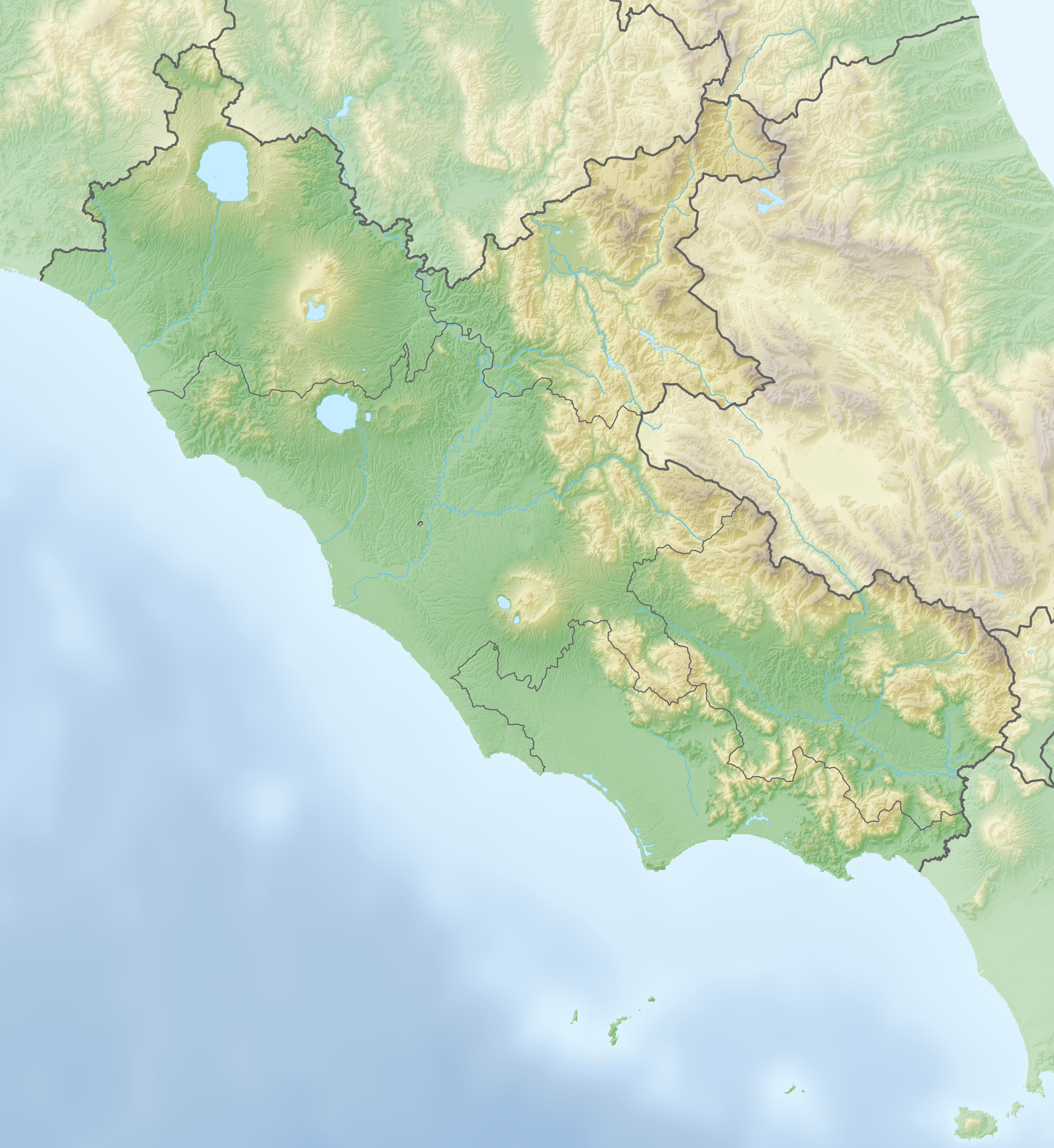
- Location of the former synagogue in modern-day Lazio

Religion
- Affiliation: Judaism (former)
- Ecclesiastical or organizational status: Ancient synagogue (1st–5th century); Archaeological site
- Status: Ruins

Location
- Location: Ancient Ostia, Imperial Rome, Lazio
- Country: Italy
- Interactive map of Ostia Synagogue
- Coordinates: 41°44′56″N 12°17′19″E

Architecture
- Type: Synagogue architecture
- Completed: 1st century
- Direction of façade: Southeast (towards Jerusalem)

Website
- ostiaantica.beniculturali.it

The Ostia Synagogue is an ancient former Jewish synagogue and archaeological site, located in ancient Ostia, the seaport of Imperial Rome, in modern-day Lazio, in Italy. It is one of the oldest synagogues in the world, the oldest synagogue in Europe and the oldest mainstream Jewish synagogue yet uncovered outside the Land of Israel. The synagogue building dates from the reign of Claudius (41–54 AD) and continued in use as a synagogue into the 5th century AD.

== Architecture ==
=== Dating ===
There is a scholarly debate about the status of the synagogue building in the 1st century AD, with some maintaining that the building began as a house only later converted to use as a synagogue, and others arguing that it was in use as a synagogue from the 1st century.

=== Construction ===
In its earliest form, the synagogue featured a main hall with benches along three walls; a propylaeum or monumental gateway featuring four marble columns; and a triclinium or dining room with couches along three walls. There was a water well and basin near the entryway for ritual washings. The main door of the synagogue faces the southeast, towards Jerusalem.

An aedicula, to serve as a Torah Ark, was added in the 4th century AD. A donor inscription implies that it replaced an earlier wooden platform donated in the 2nd century AD, which itself had been replaced by a newer Ark donated by one Mindus Faustus in the 3rd century AD.

== Gallery ==
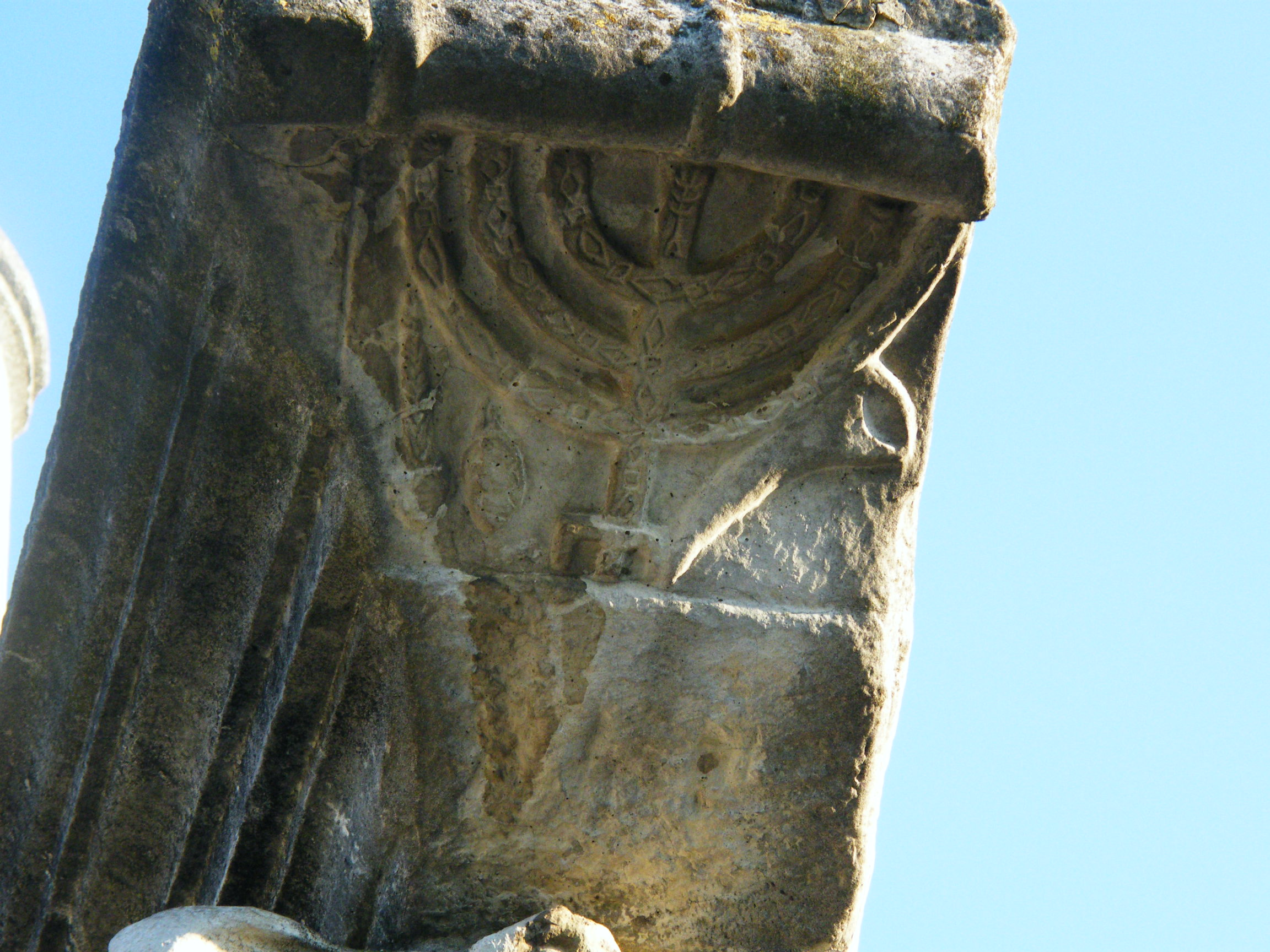
Detail of a menorah relief on a column

== See also ==
- Historic synagogues
- History of the Jews in Italy
- List of synagogues in Italy
- List of oldest synagogues in the world
