= Delos Synagogue =

1st-century BC building in Mykonos Municipality, Greece

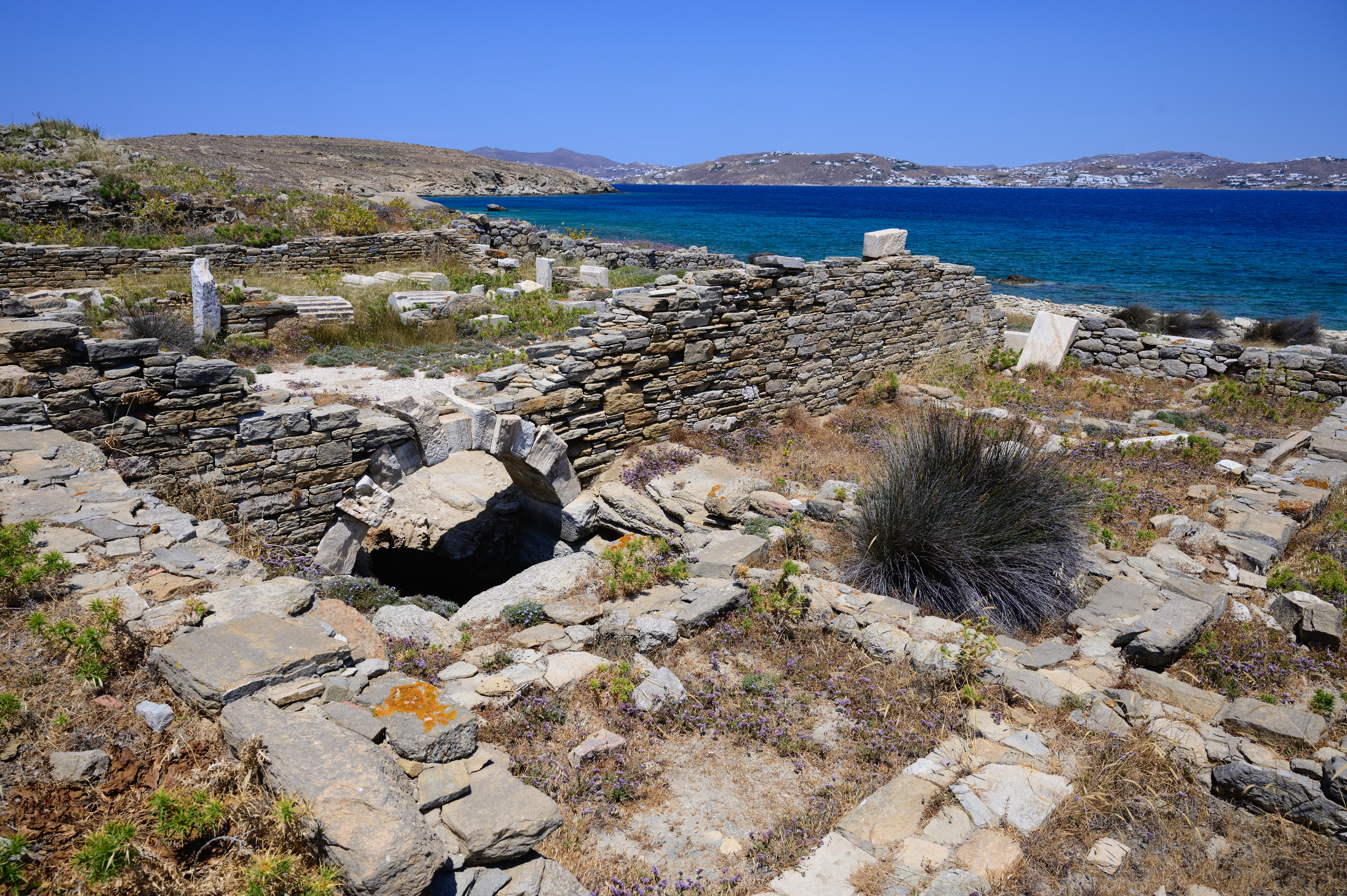
- Possible Hellenistic synagogue at Delos

- Location of the ruins in the South Aegean Sea, in Greece

Religion
- Affiliation: Indeterminate; (Judaism)

Location
- Location: Delos, Mykonos, South Aegean
- Country: Greece
- Coordinates: 37°24′18″N 25°16′28″E

Architecture
- Completed: c. 150 – c. 128 BCE

The Delos Synagogue is the name given to a second century Hellenic structure that is located in Delos, in the Mykonos Municipality of the South Aegean region of modern-day Greece. Constructed between 150 and 128 BCE, the origins of the building were initially proposed as a Samaritan or Jewish synagogue; however the building's identification as a synagogue is no longer definitive.

If its existence as a synagogue were proven, the building would be one of the oldest known synagogues.

== Discovery and location ==
The structure was discovered in 1912 by a team led by archaeologist André Plassart. Located on the eastern side of the city of Delos, the building was far from the central areas of the city. Instead, it was built in a section of Delos called the "Stadium Quarter". In contrast to the religious and commercial focus at Delos' centre, this section was mostly residential.

The original identification of the building as a synagogue by Plassart was based in large part on a dedicatory inscription referring to "Theos Hypsistos", or "God Most High", sometimes used as a name for the god of the Jews in antiquity, though not exclusively.

== Description ==
The dominating feature of the building is the large hall, which was presumably used in a flexible way, with moveable furniture, since there is no evidence for benches built along the walls. The hall is oriented towards the east, with a series of secondary rooms at the southern end. The structure itself consisted of two large rooms containing a throne and multiple marble benches as well as many smaller rooms which allowed for access to a cistern.

== Purpose ==
The building's initial use is unknown. The identification of the building as a synagogue or a Samaritan place of worship at any point in its history has been a matter of debate. The first to challenge Plassart's assessment was Belle Mazur in 1935. The construction of benches around the internal walls is used by some as an argument for a synagogue, although this seating arrangement is also known from two pagan temples and other buildings on Delos. Those who accepted Plassart's identification pushed the date from when the structure is supposed to have served as a synagogue to its early phases, although the benches were only added in its last phase. Determination of "synagogue" architecture and inscriptions was further complicated by the presence of a modern (1985) Samaritan community not far from the building.

Plassart's initial identification was based on an inscription that was later found to be at a different location, roughly 90 m (300 ft) from the alleged synagogue (area GD 80), in a house located in a residential area (area GD 79). Matassa writes: "there is nothing in the structure of GD 80 itself that is in any way Jewish in nature."

Matassa argues that neither the physical, literary, or epigraphic evidence supports the identification of the building as a synagogue.

More recent studies have concluded that the evidence suggesting that this building was a synagogue is tenuous at best and will remain an open question.

== Literary evidence ==
There is literary evidence indicating the presence of Jews or Samaritans on Delos. The most substantial text is via Josephus, in the form of a letter to Roman consul Julius Gaius and the council of Parium, specifically referring to the Jews of Delos, dated approximately 70 A.D.:

The Jews in Delos and some of the neighbouring Jews, some of your envoys also being present, have appealed to me and declared that you are preventing them by statute from observing their national customs and sacred rites. Now it displeases me that such statutes should be made against our friends and allies and that they should be forbidden to live in accordance with their customs and to contribute money to common meals and sacred rites, for this they are not forbidden to do even in Rome. For example, Gaius Caesar, our consular praetor, by edict forbade religious societies to assemble in the city, but these people alone he did not forbid to do so or to collect contributions or to hold common meals.

— Josephus, AJ 14.213–216

== See also ==
- French School at Athens
- List of oldest synagogues
