= Synagogue-Church at Gerasa =

Church in Jordan

Coordinates: 32.2826°N 35.8898°E

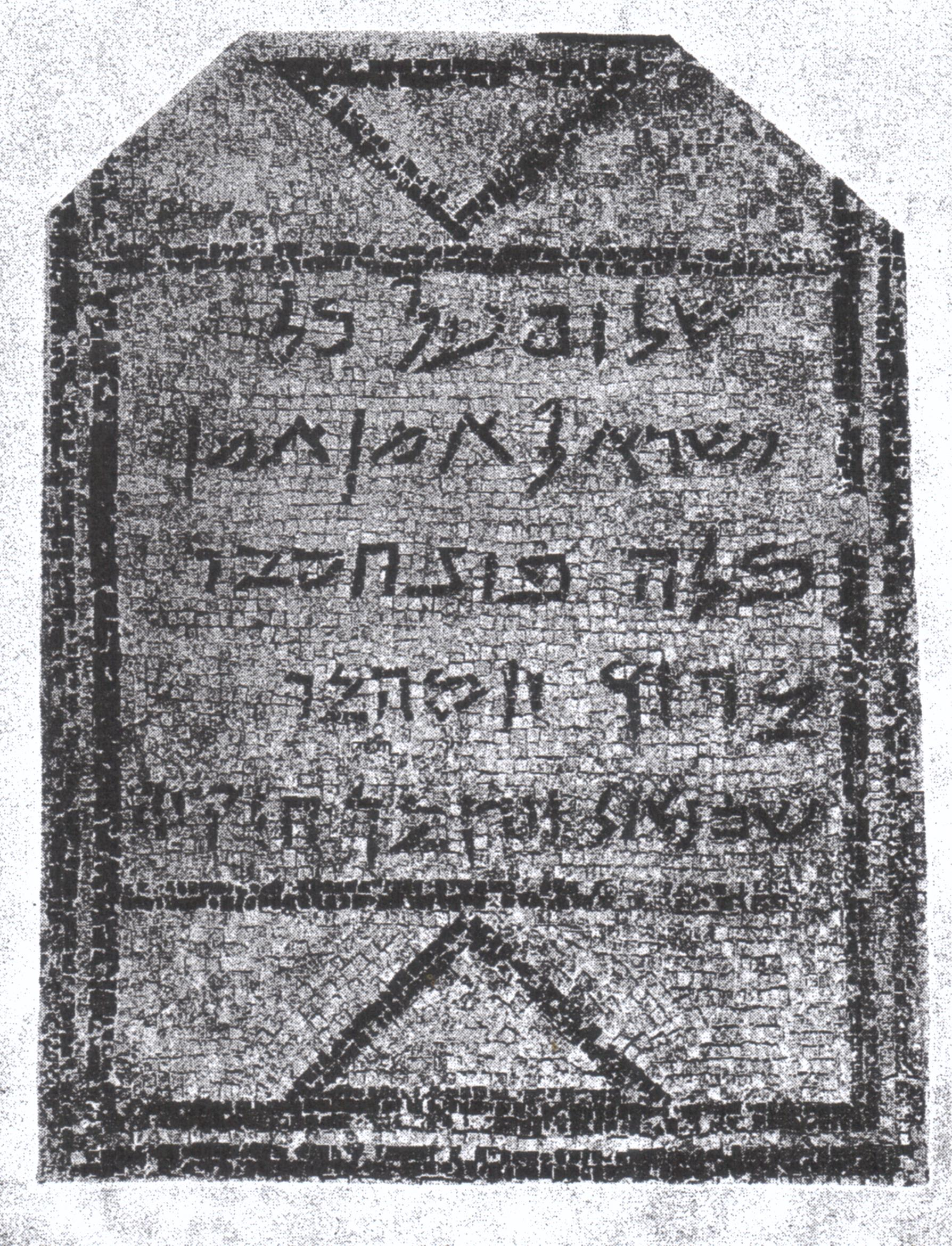
A mosaic in old Hebrew, found in the Byzantine church that was built in Jerash in AD 530

The Synagogue-Church at Gerasa in northwestern Jordan was originally an ancient Byzantine era synagogue that was later converted to a church. It is located within the Decapolis city of Gerasa and is situated on high ground that overlooks the Temple of Artemis at Gerasa. The synagogue is evidence of Jewish settlement in the Transjordan through late antiquity.

The synagogue was discovered several centimeters beneath the church and is dated to approximately the third or fourth century CE. At the east end of the site existed a vestibule, opening to the nave within which stood two rows of columns creating north and south aisles. At the far western end of the site existed a niche believed to be facing towards Jerusalem and oriented prayer. Under the anti-Jewish persecution of Emperor Justinian, the building was converted to a church in about 530 or 531 CE. As a part of this conversion, a new mosaic with geometric features was laid over the synagogue's original mosaics and the orientation of the building was changed 180° with an apse built over what used to be the synagogue's vestibule.

== Mosaics and inscriptions ==
At the synagogue layer there are several mosaics. One of them depicts the biblical story of Noah and the Flood, with pairs of animals emerging in rows from the ark. Flanking the depiction of the Noah narrative on its border are a cluster of prominent Jewish symbols, consisting of a menorah, a shofar, an incense shovel, a lulabh, and ethrog. The border in this section also contains a Greek inscription ending in "peace to the congregation (synagōgē)." The mosaic floor in the western part of the nave has a benefactor's inscription consisting of a frame with a vertical tabula ansata stating in Hebrew-Aramaic: "Peace be upon all Israel, Amen, Amen Selah, Pinhas son of Barukh, Yosi son of Shemuel and Yudan son of Hizqiyahu."
