= Indian Jews in Israel =

Immigrants of Indian Jews communities that reside in Israel

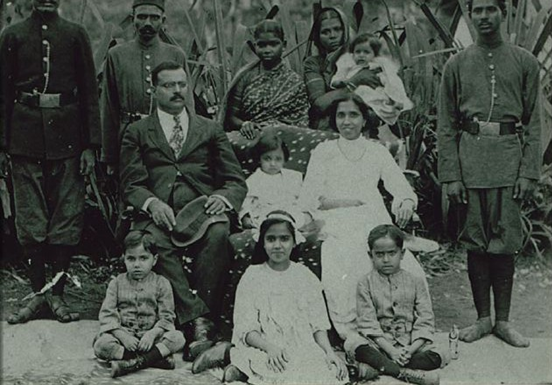
- Indian Jewish family

Total population
- 85,000

Regions with significant populations
- Tel Aviv, Nevatim, Shahar, Yuval, Mesilat Zion, Jerusalem, Maalot, Acre, Migdal Haemek, Tzfat, Tiberias, Kiryat Shemona, Nesher, Afula, Nazareth Illit, Beersheba, Ramla, Dimona, Yeruham, and other major Israeli cities

Languages
- Hebrew (Main language for all generations); Older generation: Judeo-Malayalam, Judeo-Marathi, Judeo-Urdu, Judeo-Zo, other South Asian languages

Religion
- Judaism

Indian Jews in Israel are immigrants and descendants of the immigrants of the Indian Jewish communities, who now reside within the State of Israel. Indian Jews who live in Israel include thousands of Cochin Jews and Paradesi Jews of Kerala; thousands of Baghdadi Jews from Bombay and Kolkata; tens of thousands from the Bene Israel of Maharashtra and other parts of British India and the Bnei Menashe of Manipur and Mizoram.

== History ==
=== Aliyah or migration to Israel ===
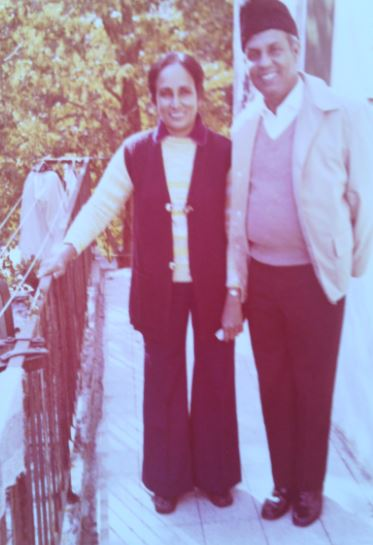
A Jewish couple from Cochin after immigrating to Israel

Since the formation of modern state Israel in 1948, the majority of Indian Jews have "made Aliyah" or emigrated to that country. Jews during the British colonial rule were divided into many different communities such as the Bene Israel and Baghdadi Jews, though the Baghdadi Jews refused to recognize the B'nei Israel as Jews, and withheld dispensing charity to them for that reason while the Bene Israel continued to dispense charity to all those in need. There are reminders of Jewish localities in Kerala still left such as Synagogues. Majority of Jews from the old British-Indian capital of Calcutta (Kolkata) have also migrated to Israel over the last seven decades.

When India became independent from Britain in 1947 and Israel declared independence in 1948 and with the heightened nationalism and emphasis in the Partition of India of Hindu and Muslim identities, most of Cochin Jews emigrated from India. Generally they went to Israel (made aliyah). Many from the migrants joined the moshavim (agricultural settlements) of Nevatim, Shahar, Yuval, and Mesilat Zion. Others settled in the neighbourhood of Katamon in Jerusalem, and in Beersheba, Ramla, Dimona and Yeruham, where many Bene Israel had settled and maintained a Judeo-Marathi dialect.

Between 1948 and 1952, some 2,300 Bene Israel made Aliyah to Israel, from India, many as refugees from predominantly Muslim lands (western parts of British India). Several rabbis refused to marry Bene Israel to other Jews, on grounds that they were not legitimate Jews. As a result of sit-down protests and hunger strikes, the Jewish Agency returned 337 individuals in several groups to India between 1952 and 1954. Most returned to Israel after several years.

On 23 November 2025, the Israeli government announced the approval of a proposal to bring all 5,800 Jews of the Bnei Menashe to Israel over the next five years by 2030.

=== Racism faced by Bene Israel ===
In 1962, the Indian and international press reported that European-Jewish authorities in Israel had treated the Bene Israel with racism due to their darker skin colour. They objected to the Chief Rabbi of Israel ruling that, before registering a marriage between Indian Jews and Jews not belonging to that community, the registering rabbi should investigate the lineage of the Indian applicant for possible non-Jewish descent. In case of doubt, they should require the applicant to perform conversion or immersion. The discrimination may be related to the fact that some religious authorities believed that the Bene Israel were not fully Jewish because of having intermarried during their long separation from major communities of Jews. Most Israelis thought that was a convenient cover for racially based bias against Jews who were not Ashkenazi or Sephardim. Between 1962 and 1964, the Bene Israel community staged protests, and in 1964 the Israeli Rabbinate declared that the Bene Israel are "full Jews in every respect".

== Present status ==
The Report of the High Level Commission on the Indian Diaspora reviewed life in Israel for the Bene Israel community. It noted that the city of Beersheba in Southern Israel has the largest community of Bene Israel, with a sizable one in Ramla. They operate a new form of the joint family transnationally. Generally the first generation Bene Israel in Israel have not been politically active by choice and had modest means typical of many first generation arrivals in Israel. Successive generations have generally assimilated into Israel's diverse populace and contribute in numerous fields including army/intelligence, management, arts, sports and education. The Israeli state reports that they have not formed continuing economic connections to India and have limited political status in Israel. However, Bene Israel do maintain social and cultural ties with family and friends in India, Israel, the United States, the U.K. and other countries. As noted by the Jewish Women's Archive and other sources, periodicals covering the global Bene Israel community has been continuously distributed to select community members since the founding of Wilson College, Mumbai. As Israelites, the Bene Israel overwhelmingly support Israeli political parties favoring a strong defense policy and continued development in the West Bank.

The Cochin Jews form a significant majority in the moshavim (agricultural settlements) of Nevatim, Shahar, Yuval, and Mesilat Zion. Others settled in the neighbourhood of Katamon in Jerusalem, and in Beersheba, Ramla, Dimona, and Yeruham, where many Bene Israel had settled. The migrated Cochin Jews still continue to speak Judeo Malayalam.

== Notable people ==
- Eli Ben-Menachem
- Ruby Daniel
- Samson Kehimkar
- Sarah Avraham
- Ben Avram
- Eban Hyams
- Uri Benjamin
- Ofer Talker
- Liora Itzhak

== Gallery ==
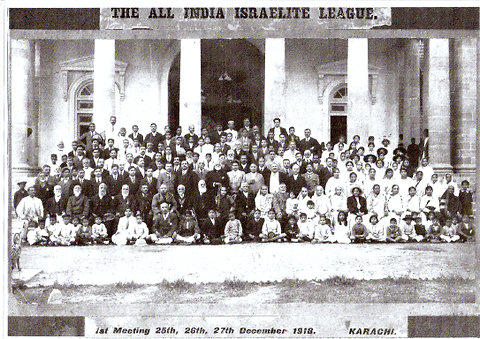
Bene Israel

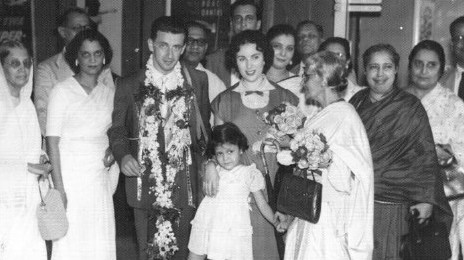
Bene Israel

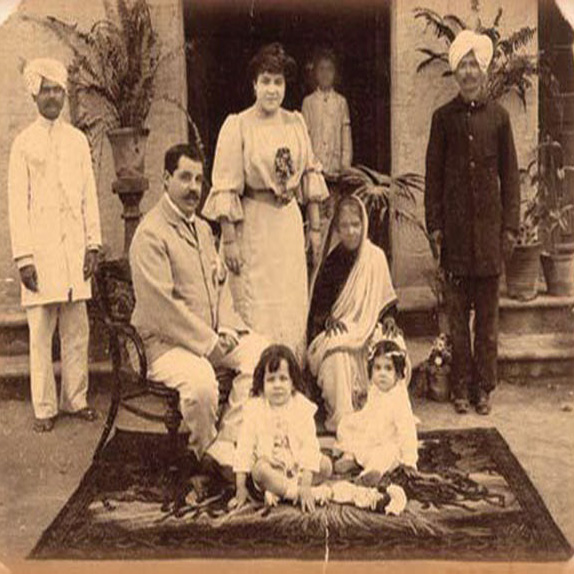
Indian Jews

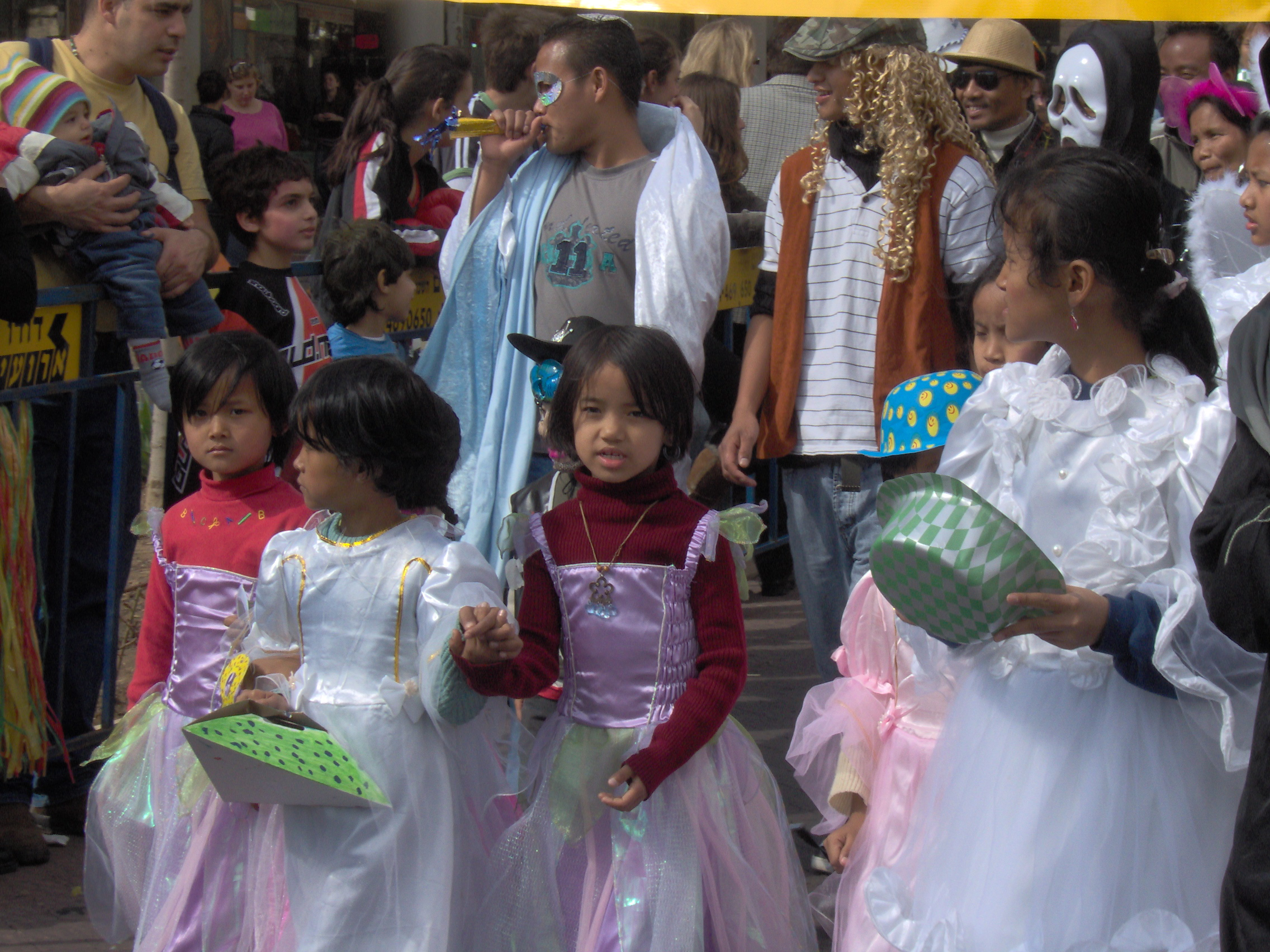
Bnei Menashe

== See also ==
- Judaism in India
- Jewish ethnic divisions
- Cochin Jews
- Paradesi Jews
- Sephardic Jews in India
- Bene Israel
- Bnei Menashe
- Bene Ephraim
- Indians in Israel
- Jewish–Romani relations
