= Indians in Israel =

Community of the Indian diaspora

Indians in Israel הודים בישראל
Regions with significant populations
- Tel Aviv, Beersheva, Ramla

Languages
- Hebrew • Judeo-Malayalam • Judeo-Marathi • Judeo-Urdu • Hindi • English • Telugu • Kannada • Konkani • Indian Languages

Religion
- Judaism, Hinduism, Christianity, Islam and other Indian religions

Related ethnic groups
- Indian Jews in Israel, NRI and PIO, Indian Jews, Jews

Indians in Israel consist of those who identify as Jewish, such as Cochin Jews and Bene Israelis, and those who identify as other categories of Indians. In 2026, there are over 100,000 Jews of Indian origin who hold Israeli passport, while around 18,000 to 20,000 Indian nationals are employed in Israel.

The vast majority of Indian nationals in Israel work in the healthcare sector, such as caregivers to the elderly. There is also a notable population of IT workers and diamond traders.

Indian students also make up the largest foreign student community in Israel.

There is a significant community of Indian Jews in Israel doing white-collar jobs, mainly working in the industrial sector; some have started their own businesses. They are mostly members of mixed families, more specifically, Halachically non-Jewish members of Jewish households living in Israel. The Indian migrants work in sectors of the Israeli economy such as construction, manufacturing, and the service sector. Most Indian migrants come from places such as Ernakulam, Mala, Parur, Chennamangalam , and Cochin. Around 85,000 Indians in Israel are Indian Jews.

Numerous Indian companies have offices in Israel, but they employ mostly Israeli nationals.

Israel views India more favorably than any other country in the world, and India is the most popular destination for Israeli tourists. Narendra Modi has been considered by some to be the most popular person in Israel. Indians are largely viewed in global circles as being pro-Israel.

Telugu expats account for 4000, with 800 from Telangana's Nizamabad and Karimnagar districts mostly, and 3200 from Andhra Pradesh's erstwhile East Godavari and West Godavari districts mostly.

== Culture ==
=== Jews ===
In 2011, cultural artists and performers from India arrived in Israel to participate in a three-week festival commemorating 20 years of diplomatic relations between the two countries. According to India's then Ambassador to Israel Navtej Sarna, the purpose of the festival was to improve the bilateral relationship between the two countries by facilitating a greater understanding of each other's culture.

=== Hindus, Buddhists, Jains ===
Traditionally the majority of Indians in Israel were Jewish, though a growing population of Hindus has been appearing in recent times coinciding with the improved relations between Israel and India under Modi's premiership. In 2020, about 0.01% of Israel's population were Hindus.

==== Yoga ====
Founded internationally by Swami Vishnudevananda (a direct disciple of Swami Sivananda of Rishikesh), the organization established its first permanent branch in Israel in the early 1970s. The centre has since operated as a prominent institution for the instruction of traditional yoga.

A group of devotees is living in Katzir-Harish. Another Vaishnava community is in Israeli settlement in west bank in Israeli-occupied territory of Ariel. It is spearheaded by Jagadish and his wife, Jugala-Priti, and serves a growing community. Jugala-Priti joined the ISKCON center in Tel Aviv, in 1996 guided by Gunavatar and Varshabhanavi.

In 2015, the United Nations General Assembly voted unanimously in favor of adopting 21 June as International Yoga Day. In a clear sign of growing affinity between the two countries, the Indian Embassy in Tel Aviv organizes annual yoga day celebrations, where Israelis from all walks of life take part in various yogic exercises. Yoga has proven to be immensely popular in Israel and is a sign of Israel's cultural connection to India.

=== Muslims ===
There is very little information available about Muslims migrating to Israel from India. There are restrictions for non-Jews in obtaining Israeli citizenship or permanent residency. However, there are diverse migrants from India living there for work. Non-Indian Muslims have also been living there for a long time as a permanent citizen.

Indian Muslims have 800 years old long association with Jerusalem. In the 12th century, Baba Farid, a Sufi saint from India, came to this city and spent 40 days in meditation. Later he returned to India. The place where he meditated became a place of importance for Indian Muslims. Indian Muslims started coming to this place at the end of Hajj or other religious pilgrimages. Very soon the place was named 'Zawiyat al-Hunud', which means "Indian Corner." The place gained respect as a place of shrine and was converted into a hospice for indian muslims. Under the current regime, this 'Indian Hospice' is being supported by the Ministry of External Affairs of the Government of India. An Indian muslim named Sheikh Munir Ansari, who is the trustee of the Indian Hospice in Jerusalem, was honored with Pravasi Bhartiya Samman in 2011. Muslims also visits Israel for educational tour and work.

== Laborers ==
In May 2023, Foreign Minister Eli Cohen agreed to a foreign worker deal with Indian Foreign Minister Jaishankar, in which India would send 42,000 workers predominantly in the construction field, to Israel. The bilateral agreement reached the full Knesset for a vote on its approval in November 2023.

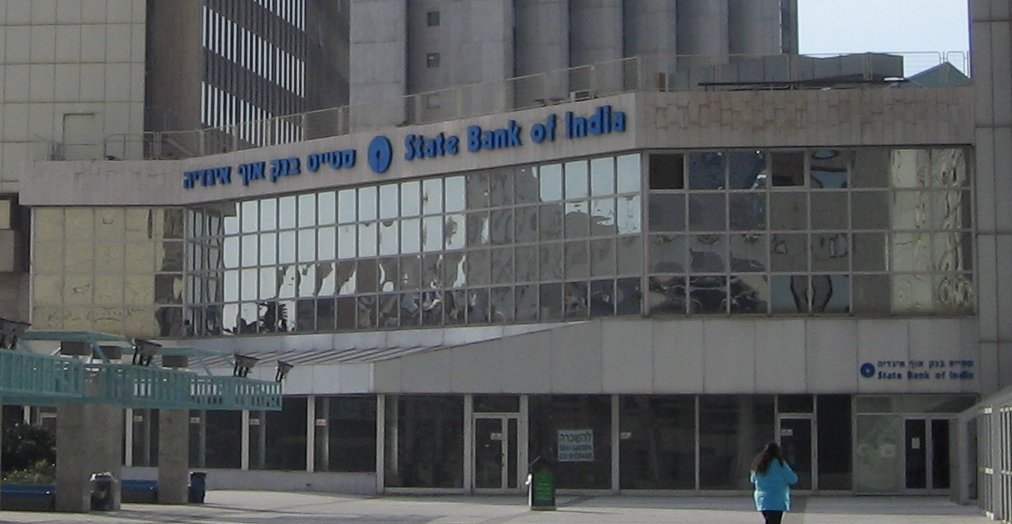
The State Bank of India in Israel

In the aftermath of the Gaza war, Israeli business groups in October 2023, including The Israel Builders Association, have urged the Israeli government to hire up to 100,000 Indian workers to replace Palestinians who had their work permits cancelled due to the war. These workers receive a monthly wage of $1600.

Furthermore, around 20,000 from Sri Lanka will also travel to Israel as part of the same initiative, joining an existing group of 9000 Sri Lankans who work in various professional and non-professional jobs.

== Tourism ==
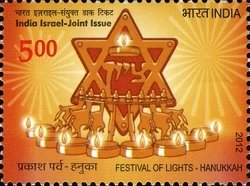
Stamp commemorating the relationship between India and Israel

Israel has a strict visa policy due to security fears. Nevertheless, Israel is a booming destination for Indian tourists and Israel has been courting increased tourism from India. Around 60,000 Indian nationals visited Israel in 2017, and 40,000 during the first half of 2018. In 2019, 75,000 nationals of India visited Israel.

Conversely India is a very popular destination for young Israeli tourists. India is the leading destination for Israeli tourists. Around 40,000 Israelis visit India annually.

Israel has gained sizable popularity among business travelers from India as well. Defense tourism has also been a growing niche as well.

In 2024, the Indian ministry of foreign affairs said that its embassy was in "constant contact" with 20,000 — 30,000 Indian nationals within Israel.

== See also ==
- Hinduism in Israel
- Indian Jews in Israel
- India–Israel relations
