= Cochin Jews =

Jewish community that settled in the Kingdom of Cochin in modern-day Kerala, India

יְהוּדֵֽי־קוֹצִֽ׳ין കൊച്ചിയിലെ ജൂതന്മാർ
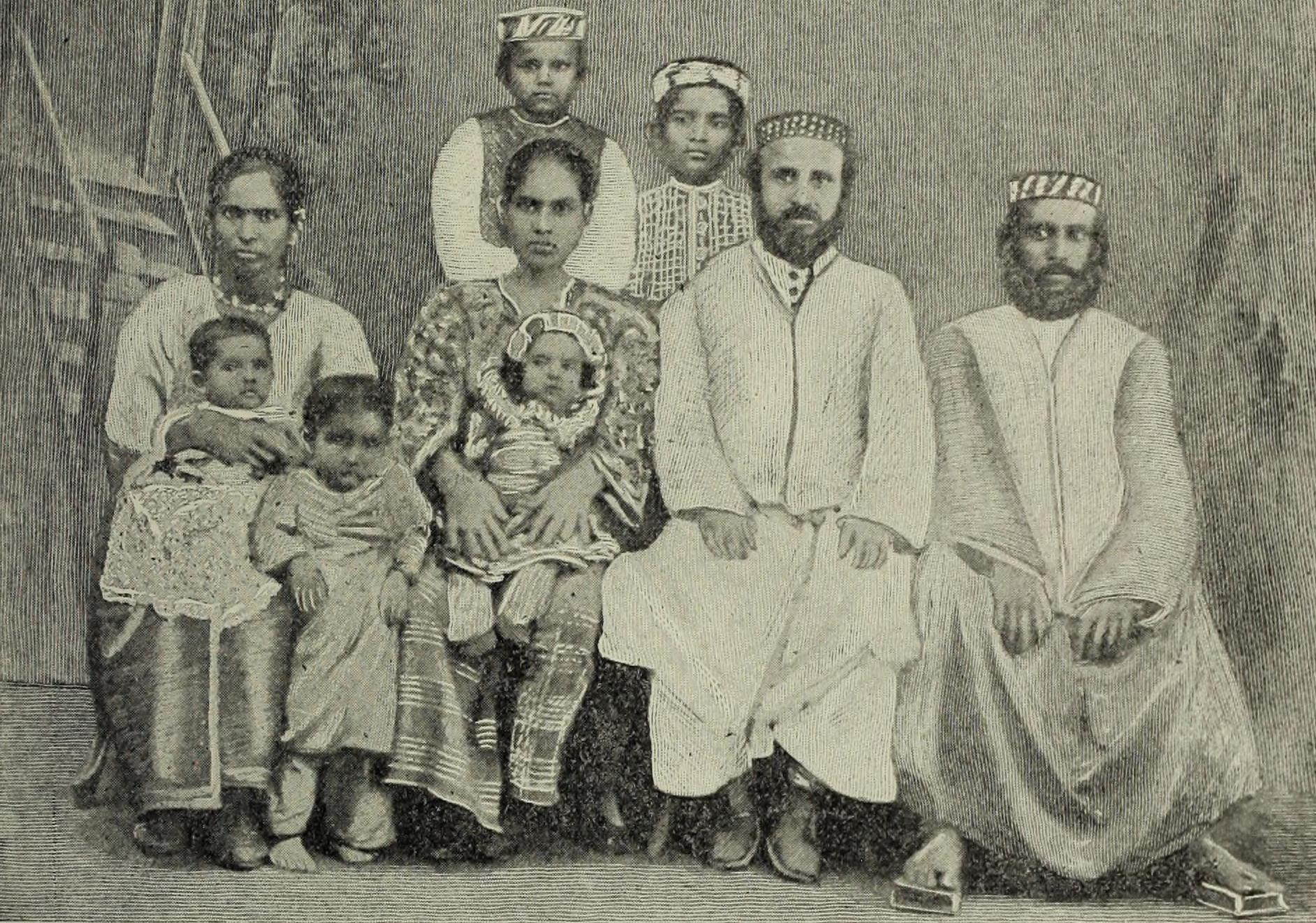
- A Malabar Jewish family (1900)

Regions with significant populations
- Israel: 8,000 (2009)
- India: 15

Languages
- Hebrew, Judeo-Malayalam, Malayalam

Religion
- Judaism

Related ethnic groups
- Meshuchrarim, Saint Thomas Christians, Paradesi Jews, Knanaya, Sephardic Jews, Bene Israel, Baghdadi Jews, Mizrahi Jews, Malayalis

Cochin Jews (also known as Malabar Jews or Kochinim from Hebrew: יְהוּדֵֽי־קוֹצִֽ׳ין, romanized: Yehudey Kochin) are one of the oldest groups of Jews in India, with roots that are claimed to date back to the time of King Solomon. The Cochin Jews settled in the Kingdom of Cochin in South India, now part of the present-day state of Kerala. As early as the 12th century, mention is made of the Jews in southern India by Benjamin of Tudela.

Following their expulsion from Iberia in 1492 by the Alhambra Decree, a few families of Sephardi Jews eventually made their way to Cochin in the 16th century. They became known as Paradesi Jews (or Foreign Jews). The European Jews maintained some trade connections to Europe, and their language skills were useful. Although the Sephardim spoke Ladino (Spanish or Judeo-Spanish), in India they learned Judeo-Malayalam from the Malabar Jews. The two communities retained their ethnic and cultural distinctions. In the late 19th century, a few Arabic-speaking Jews, known as Baghdadis, also immigrated to southern India from the Near East.

After India gained its independence in 1947 and Israel was established as a nation, most of the Cochin Jews made Aliyah and emigrated from Kerala to Israel in the mid-1950s. In contrast, most of the Paradesi Jews (Sephardi in origin) preferred to migrate to Australia and other Commonwealth countries, similar to the choices made by Anglo-Indians.

Most of their synagogues still exist in Kerala, with a few having been sold or adapted for other uses. Among the eight synagogues that survived till the mid-20th century, only the Paradesi synagogue still has a regular congregation. Today it also attracts tourists as a historic site. The Kadavumbhagam Ernakulam Synagogue was restored in 2018, it now houses a sefer torah with occasional services managed by one of few remaining Cochin Jews. A few synagogues are in ruins and one was even demolished with a two-story house built in its place. The synagogue at Chendamangalam (Chennamangalam) was reconstructed in 2006 as Kerala Jews Life Style Museum. The synagogue at Paravur (Parur) has been reconstructed as Kerala Jews History Museum.

== History ==
=== First Jews in South India ===
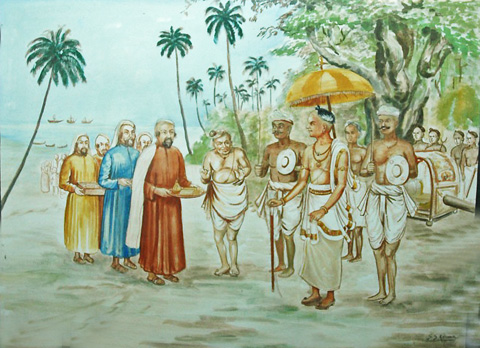
Arrival of the Jewish pilgrims at Cochin, 71 CE

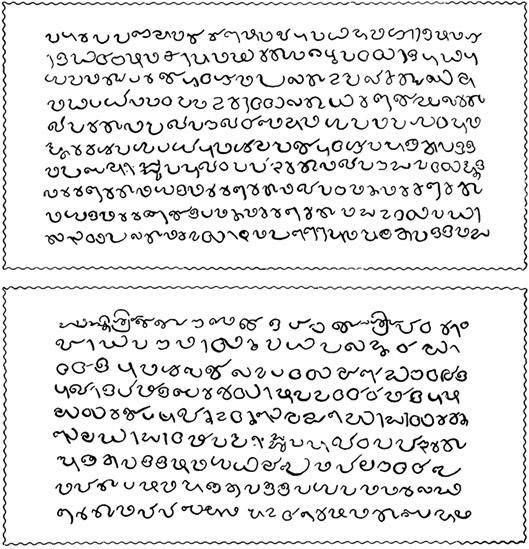
The inscription from the Sasanam outlining the grant of rights to Joseph Rabban

P. M. Jussay wrote that it was believed that the earliest Jews in India were sailors from King Solomon's time. It has been claimed that following the destruction of the First Temple in the Siege of Jerusalem (587 BCE), some Jewish exiles came to India. Only after the destruction of the Second Temple in 70 CE are records found that attest to numerous Jewish settlers arriving at Cranganore, an ancient port near Cochin. Cranganore, now transliterated as Kodungallur, but also known under other names, is a city of legendary importance to this community. Fernandes writes, it is "a substitute Jerusalem in India". Katz and Goldberg note the "symbolic intertwining" of the two cities.

Ophira Gamliel notes however that the first physical evidence of the presence of Jews in South India dates only to the granting of the Kollam copper plates. The copper plates are a trade deed dated to the year 849 C.E bestowed upon the Nestorian merchant magnate Maruvan Sapir Iso and the Saint Thomas Christian community by Ayyan Atikal, the ruler of the Kingdom of Venad. The copper plates include signatures in Kufic, Pahlavi, and Hebrew and serve as evidence of West Asian mercantilism in Kerala.

In 1768, the influential banker Tobias Boas (nl) of The Hague had posed eleven questions to Rabbi Yehezkel Rachbi of Cochin. The first of these questions addressed to the said Rabbi concerned the origins of the Jews of Cochin and the duration of their settlement in India. In Rabbi Yehezkel's response (Merzbacher's Library in Munich, MS. 4238), he wrote: "after the destruction of the Second Temple (may it soon be rebuilt and reestablished in our days!), in the year 3828 of anno mundi, i. e., 68 CE, about ten thousand men and women had come to the land of Malabar and were pleased to settle in four places; those places being Cranganore, Dschalor, Madai [and] Plota. Most were in Cranganore, which is also called Mago dera Patinas; it is also called Sengale."

Saint Thomas, an Aramaic-speaking Jew from the Galilee region of Israel and one of the disciples of Jesus, is believed to have come to Southern India in the 1st century, in search of the Jewish community there. It is possible that the Jews who became Christians at that time were absorbed by what became the Nasrani Community in Kerala.

A number of scholars have noted that the Cochin Jews maintain striking cultural similarities to the Knanaya, Jewish-Christian migrants from Persia who settled in Kodungallur, Kerala in the 4th or 8th century. These symmetries are noted in both the wedding traditions and especially the folk songs of the two communities, some songs maintaining the exact same lyrics with few corruptions and variations.

Central to the history of the Cochin Jews was their close relationship with Indian rulers. This was codified on a set of copper plates granting the community special privileges. The date of these plates, known as "Sâsanam", is contentious. The plates are physically inscribed with the date 379 CE, but in 1925, tradition was setting it as 1069 CE. Indian rulers granted the Jewish leader Joseph Rabban the rank of prince over the Jews of Cochin, giving him the rulership and tax revenue of a pocket principality in Anjuvannam near Cranganore, and rights to seventy-two "free houses".

The Hindu king gave permission in perpetuity (or, in the more poetic expression of those days, "as long as the world, sun and moon endure") for Jews to live freely, build synagogues, and own property "without conditions attached". A family connection to Rabban, "the king of Shingly" (another name for Cranganore), was long considered a sign of both purity and prestige within the community. Rabban's descendants led this distinct community until a chieftainship dispute broke out between two brothers, one of them named Joseph Azar, in the 16th century.

The Jewish traveler Benjamin of Tudela, speaking of Kollam (Quilon) on the Malabar Coast, writes in his Itinerary:

"[t]hroughout the island, including all the towns thereof, live several thousand Israelites. The inhabitants are all black, and the Jews also. The latter are good and benevolent. They know the law of Moses and the prophets, and to a small extent the Talmud and Halacha."

These people later became known as the Malabari Jews. They built synagogues in Kerala beginning in the 12th and 13th centuries. The oldest known gravestone of a Cochin Jew is written in Hebrew and dates to 1269 CE. It is near the Chendamangalam Synagogue, built in 1614, which is now operated as a museum.

In 1341, a disastrous flood silted up the port of Cranganore, and trade shifted to a smaller port at Cochin (Kochi). Many of the Jews moved quickly, and within four years, they had built their first synagogue at the new community.

The Portuguese Empire established a trading beachhead in 1500, and until 1663 remained the dominant power. They continued to discriminate against the Jews, although doing business with them. A synagogue was built at Parur in 1615, at a site that according to tradition had a synagogue built in 1165. Almost every member of this community emigrated to Israel in 1954.

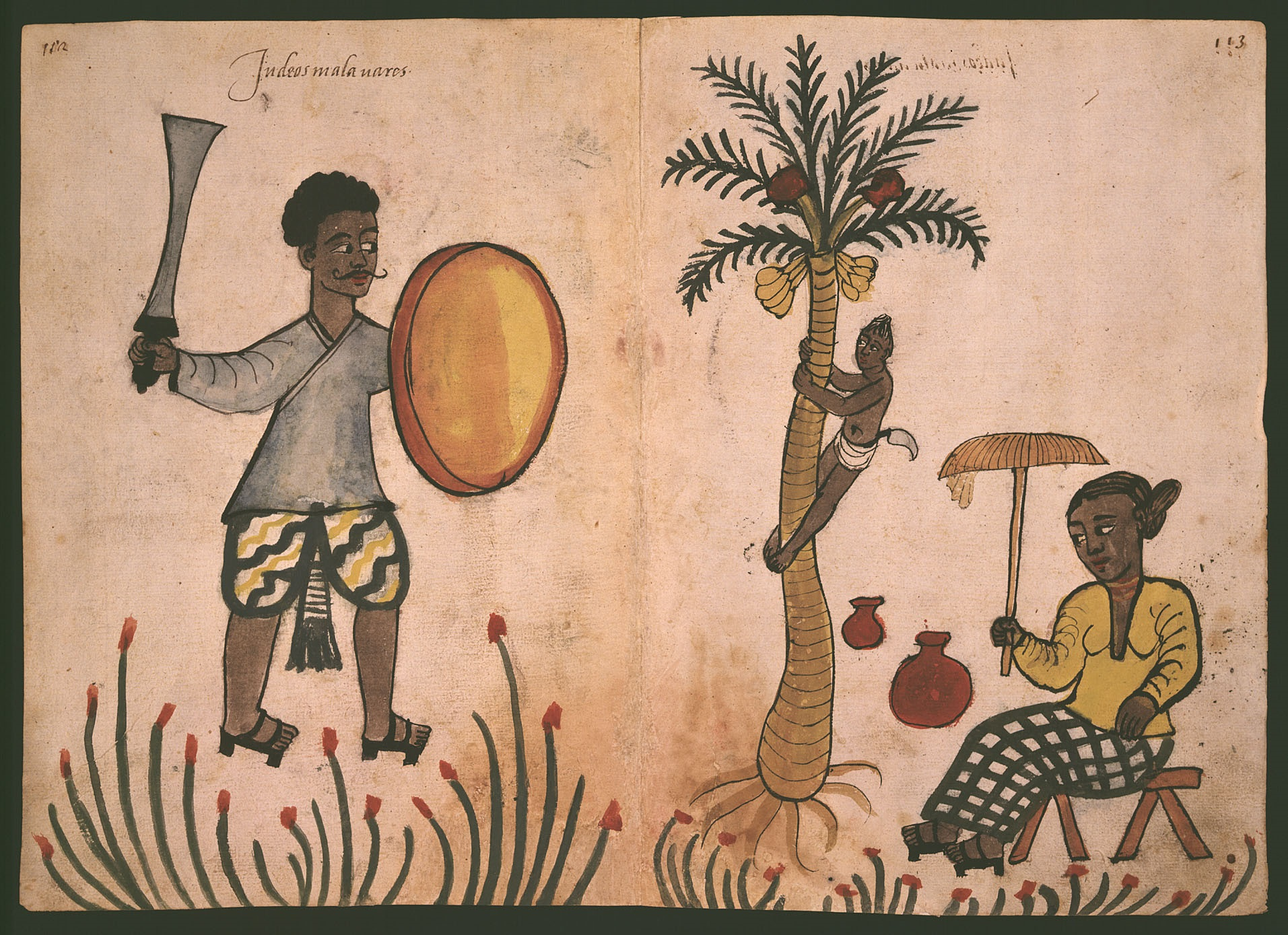
Jewish couple depicted in 16th century Portuguese Códice Casanatense

In 1524, the Muslims, backed by the ruler of Calicut (today called Kozhikode and not to be confused with Calcutta), attacked the wealthy Jews of Cranganore because of their primacy in the lucrative pepper trade. The Jews fled south to the Kingdom of Cochin, seeking the protection of the Cochin Royal Family (Perumpadapu Swaroopam). The Hindu Raja of Cochin gave them asylum. Moreover, he exempted Jews from taxation but bestowed on them all privileges enjoyed by the tax-payers.

The Malabar Jews built additional synagogues at Mala and Ernakulam. In the latter location, Kadavumbagham Synagogue was built about 1200 and restored in the 1790s. Its members believed they were the congregation to receive the historic copper plates. In the 1930s and 1940s, the congregation was as large as 2,000 members, but all emigrated to Israel.

Thekkambagham Synagogue was built in Ernakulam in 1580, and rebuilt in 1939. It is the synagogue in Ernakulam sometimes used for services if former members of the community visit from Israel. In 1998, five families who were members of this congregation still lived in Kerala or in Madras.

=== A Jewish traveler's visit to Cochin ===
The following is a description of the Jews of Cochin by 16th-century Jewish traveler Zechariah Dhahiri (recollections of his travels circa 1558).

I travelled from the land of Yemen unto the land of India and Cush, in order to search out a better livelihood. I had chosen the frontier route, where I made a passage across the Great Sea by ship for twenty days... I arrived at the city of Calicut, which upon entering I was sorely grieved at what I had seen, for the city's inhabitants are all uncircumcised and given over to idolatry. There isn't to be found in her a single Jew with whom I could have, otherwise, taken respite in my journeys and wanderings. I then turned away from her and went into the city of Cochin, wherein I found what my soul desired, insofar that a community of Spaniards is to be found there who are derived of Jewish lineage, along with other congregations of proselytes. They had been converted many years ago, of the natives of Cochin and Germany. They are adept in their knowledge of Jewish laws and customs, acknowledging the injunctions of the Divine Law (Torah), and making use of its means of punishment. I dwelt there three months, among the holy congregations.

=== 1660 to independence ===
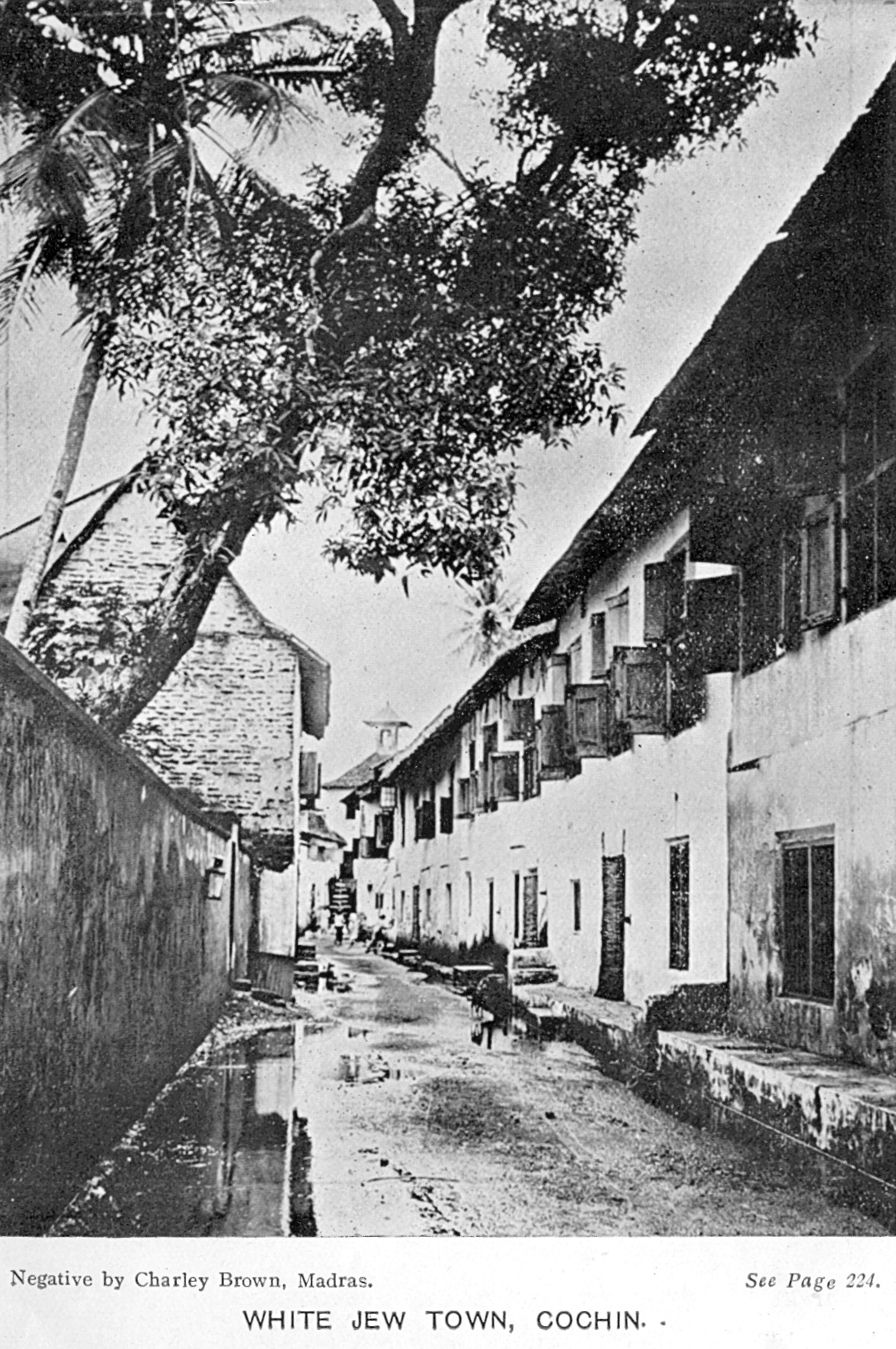
Photo identified as "White Jew town", Cochin, 1913

The Paradesi Jews, also called "White Jews", settled in the Cochin region in the 16th century and later, following the expulsion from Iberia due to forced conversion and religious persecution in Spain and then Portugal. Some fled north to Holland but the majority fled east to the Ottoman Empire. Both "Black Jews" and the "White Jews" (the Spanish Jews) of Malabar claimed that they are the true inheritors of the old Jewish culture.

Some went beyond that territory, including a few families who followed the Arab spice routes to southern India. Speaking Ladino language and having Sephardic customs, they found the Malabari Jewish community as established in Cochin to be quite different. According to the historian Mandelbaum, there were resulting tensions between the two ethnic communities. The European Jews had some trade links to Europe and useful languages to conduct international trade

When the Portuguese occupied the Kingdom of Cochin, they allegedly discriminated against its Jews. Nevertheless, to some extent they shared language and culture, so ever more Jews came to live under Portuguese rule (actually under the Spanish crown, again, between 1580 and 1640). The Protestant Dutch killed the raja of Cochin, allied of the Portuguese, plus sixteen hundred Indians in 1662, during their siege of Cochin. The Jews, having supported the Dutch military attempt, suffered the murderous retaliation of both the Portuguese and Malabar populations. A year later, the second Dutch siege was successful and, after slaughtering the Portuguese, they demolished most Catholic churches or turned them into Protestant churches (not sparing the one where Vasco da Gama had been buried). They were more tolerant of Jews, having granted asylum claims in the Netherlands. (See the Goa Inquisition for the situation of Jews in nearby Goa.)

The Paradesi Jews built their own house of worship, the Paradesi Synagogue. The latter group was very small by comparison to the Malabaris. Both groups practiced endogamous marriage, maintaining their distinctions. Both communities claimed special privileges and the greater status over each other.

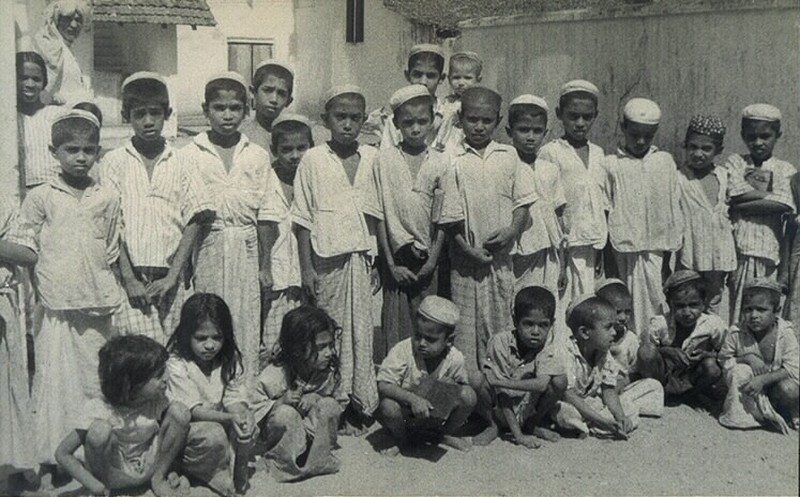
Cochin Jewish children in 1936

In the early 20th century, Abraham Barak Salem (1882–1967), a young lawyer who became known as a "Jewish Gandhi", worked to end the discrimination against meshuchrarim Jews. Inspired by Indian nationalism and Zionism, he also tried to reconcile the divisions among the Cochin Jews. He became both an Indian nationalist and Zionist. His family were descended from meshuchrarim. The Hebrew word denoted a manumitted slave, and was at times used in a derogatory way. Salem fought against the discrimination by boycotting the Paradesi Synagogue for a time. He also used satyagraha to combat the social discrimination. According to Mandelbaum, by the mid-1930s many of the old taboos had fallen with a changing society.

== Relations between the Cochin Jews and other Jews ==
Although India is noted for having four distinct Jewish communities, viz Cochin, Bene Israel (of Mumbai and its environs), Kolkata, and New Delhi, communications between the Jews of Kochi and the Bene Israel community were greatest in the mid-19th century.

According to the Bene Israel historian Haeem Samuel Kehimkar (1830-1909), several prominent members of the White Jews of Kochi had moved to Bombay in 1825, among them Michael and Abraham Sargon, David Baruch Rahabi, Hacham Samuel, and Judah David Ashkenazi. These exerted themselves not only in changing the minds of the Bene Israel and of their children generally, but also particularly in turning the minds of these few of the Bene-Israel who practiced other faiths to the study of their own religion, and to the contemplation of God. David Rahabi effected a religious revival at Revandanda, followed by his successor, Hacham Samuel.

Although David Rahabi was convinced that the Bene Israel were the descendants of the Jews, he still wanted to examine them further. He therefore gave their women clean and non-kosher fish to be cooked together, but they separated the clean from the impure, saying that they never used fish that had neither fins nor scales. Thus satisfied, he began to teach them the tenets of Judaism. He taught Hebrew reading, without translation, to three young Bene Israel men from the families of Jhiratker, Shapurker, and Rajpurker.

Another influential man from Cochin, who was of Yemenite Jewish origin, was Hakham Shelomo Salem Shurrabi who served as a Hazzan (Reader) in the then newly formed synagogue of the Bene-Israel in Bombay for the trifling sum of 100 rupees per annum, although he worked also as a book-binder. While engaged in his avocation, he was at all times ready to explain any scriptural difficulty that might happen to be brought to him by any Bene Israel. He was a Reader, Preacher, Expounder of the Law, Mohel and Shochet. He died on 17 April 1856 in Bombay.

== Since 1947 ==
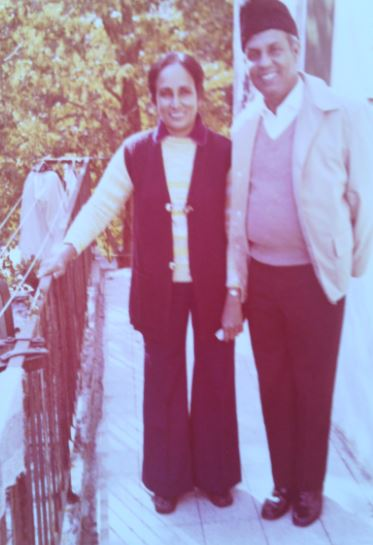
A Jewish couple from Cochin after immigrating to Israel

Judeo-Malayalam speaking communities in Kerala (largely historical) and Israel (current)

India became independent from British rule in 1947 and Israel established itself as a nation in 1948. With the heightened emphasis on the Partition of India into a secular republic of India and a semi-theocratic Pakistan, most of the Cochin Jews emigrated from India. Generally they went to Israel (made aliyah). Many of the migrants joined the moshavim (agricultural settlements) of Nevatim, Shahar, Yuval, and Mesilat Zion. Others settled in the neighbourhood of Katamon in Jerusalem, and in Beersheba, Ramla, Dimona, and Yeruham, where many Bene Israel had settled. The story is told succinctly in the award winning children's book The Blue Butterfly of Cochin, published by Kalaniot Books, with art by the Indian-American artist, Siona Benjamin. The migrated Cochin Jews still continue to speak Malayalam. Since the late 20th century, former Cochin Jews have also immigrated to the United States. It is recorded that currently only 26 Jews live in Kerala, who is located in different parts of Kerala such as Cochin, Kottayam and Thiruvalla.

In Cochin, the Paradesi Synagogue is still active as a place of worship, but the Jewish community is very small. The building also attracts visitors as a historic tourist site.

February 3, 2005, the Cochin Royal Family Heritage Historical Society along with the Jewish American Society for Historic Preservation and Dr. Kenneth X. Robbins M.D. presented a historical interpretive marker in the Kalikota Palace in Ernakulim. It is sited below the painting of His Highness, Rama Varma Pareekshith Thampuran, the Last Maharaja of Cochin.

The text is written in English with Hebrew additions from the Prophet Jeremiah and the 72 Psalm of King David.

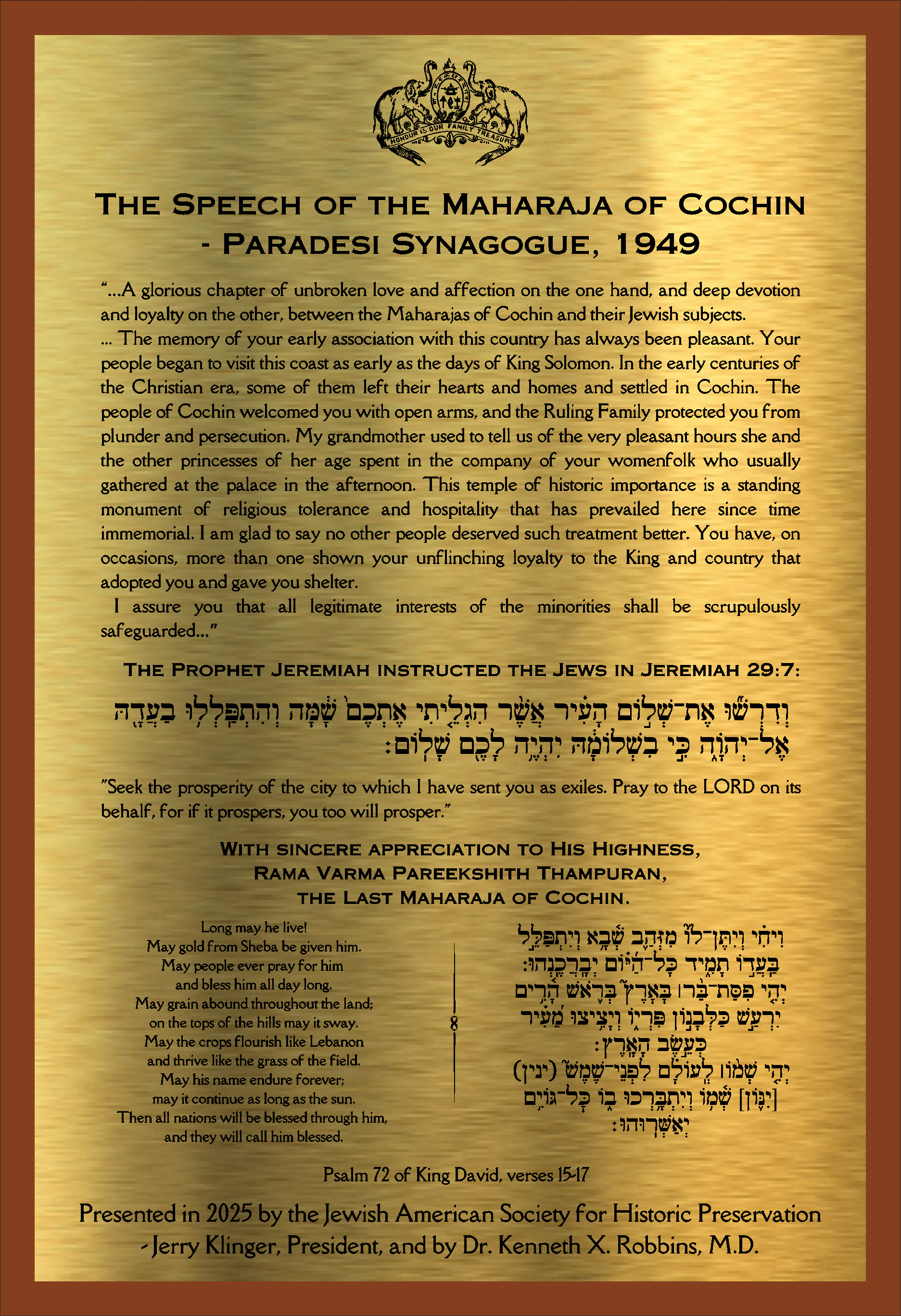
The Speech of the Maharaja of Cochin - Paradesi Synagogue, 1949

″1949"...A glorious chapter of unbroken love and affection on the one hand, and deep devotion and loyalty on the other, between the Maharajas of Cochin and their Jewish subjects.... The memory of your early association with this country has always been pleasant. Your people began to visit this coast as early as the days of King Solomon. In the early centuries of the Christian era, some of them who left their hearts and homes and settled in Cochin. The people of Cochin welcomed you with open arms, and the Ruling Family protected you from plunder and persecution. My grandmother used to tell us of the very pleasant hours she and the other princesses of her age spent in the company of your womenfolk who usually gathered at the palace in the afternoon. This temple of historic importance is a standing monument of religious tolerance and hospitality that has prevailed here since time immemorial. I am glad to say no other people deserved such treatment better. You have, on occasions, more than one shown your unflinching loyalty to the King and country that adopted you and gave you shelter. I assure you that all legitimate interests of the minorities shall be scrupulously safeguarded..."

After 1947, and particularly from the 1950s onward, the history of the Cochin Jews entered a post-communal phase marked not only by large-scale emigration to Israel but also by the gradual transfer of everyday Jewish heritage into the care of non-Jewish residents of Jew Town in Kochi. As the Jewish population declined from several hundred in the mid-20th century to a single resident in the early 21st century, domestic and artisanal traditions once central to communal life, such as kosher food preparation, synagogue textile work, and Sabbath observance, survived in fragmentary form through personal relationships rather than formal institutions. One example is the embroidery shop once run by Sarah Cohen, now maintained by Dinesh Madhavan Thaha Ibrahim, a Muslim craftsman who continues to observe the Jewish Sabbath by closing the shop on Saturdays.

== Genetic analysis ==
Genetic testing into the origins of the Cochin Jewish and other Indian Jewish communities noted that until the present day the Indian Jews maintained in the range of 3%-20% Middle Eastern ancestry, confirming the traditional narrative of migration from the Middle East to India. The tests noted however that the communities had considerable Indian admixture, exhibiting the fact that the Indian Jewish people "inherited their ancestry from Middle Eastern and Indian populations".

== Traditions and way of life ==
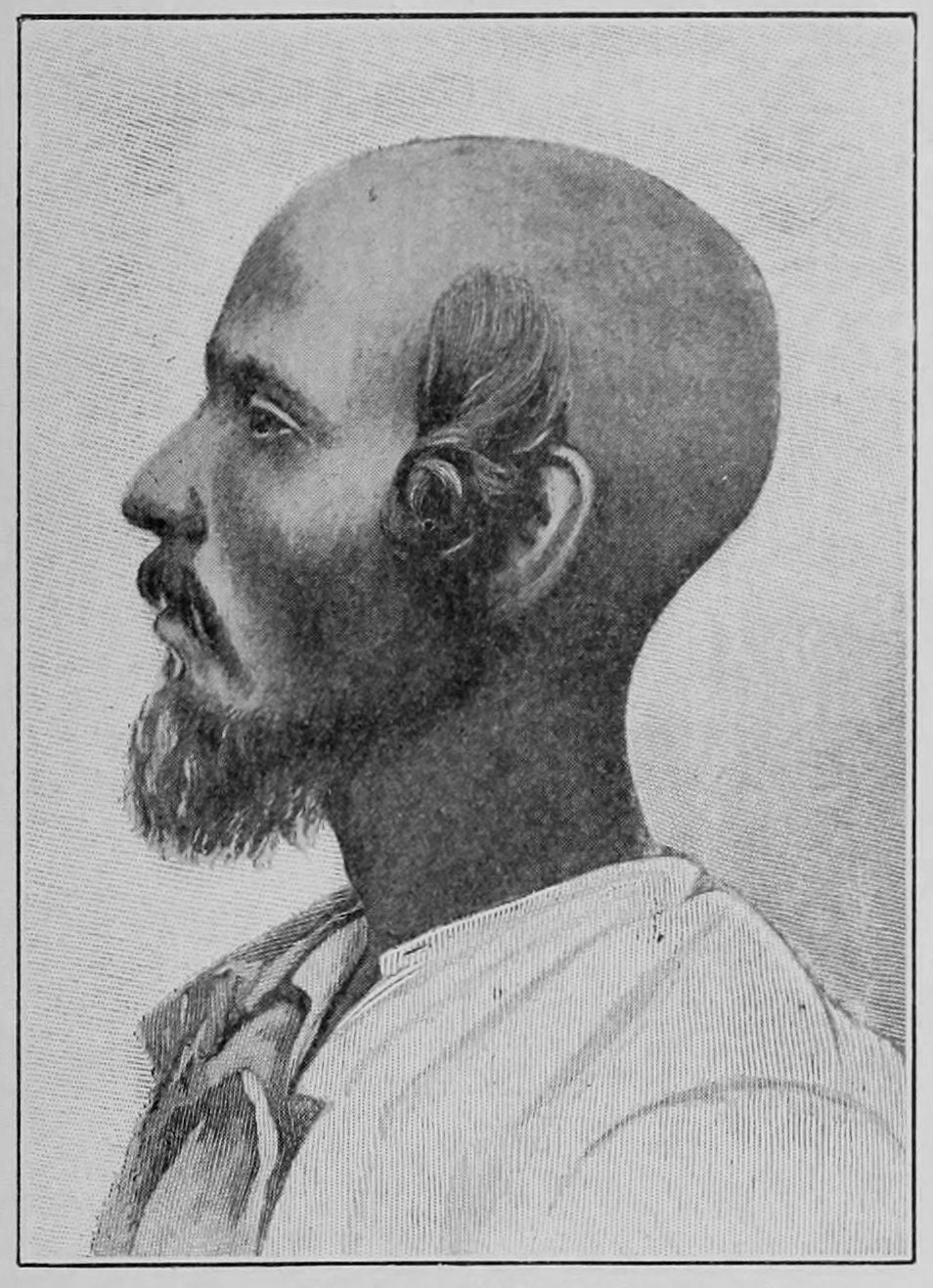
A Cochin Jewish man with payot

The 12th-century Jewish traveller Benjamin of Tudela wrote about the Malabari coast of Kerala: "They know the law of Moses and the prophets, and to a small extent the Talmud and Halacha." European Jews sent texts to the community of Cochin Jews to teach them about normative Judaism.

Maimonides (1135–1204), the preeminent Jewish philosopher of his day, wrote,

"Only lately, some well-to-do men came forward and purchased three copies of my code [the Mishneh Torah], which they distributed through messengers... Thus, the horizon of these Jews was widened, and the religious life in all communities as far as India revived."

In a 1535 letter sent from Safed to Italy, David del Rossi wrote that a Jewish merchant from Tripoli had told him the India town of Shingly (Cranganore) had a large Jewish population who dabbled in yearly pepper trade with the Portuguese. As far as their religious life, he wrote that they "only recognize the Code of Maimonides, and possessed no other authority or traditional law". According to the contemporary historian Nathan Katz, Rabbi Nissim of Gerona (the Ran) visited the Cochini Jews. They preserve in their song books the poem he wrote about them. In the Kadavumbhagam synagogue, a Hebrew school was available for both "children's education and adult study of Torah and Mishnah".

The Jewish Encyclopedia (1901-1906) said,

"Though they neither eat nor drink together, nor intermarry, the Black and the White Jews of Cochin have almost the same social and religious customs. They hold the same doctrines, use the same ritual (Sephardic), observe the same feasts and fasts, dress alike, and have adopted the same language Malayalam. ... The two classes are equally strict in religious observances",

According to Martine Chemana, the Jews of Cochin "coalesced around the religious fundamentals: devotion and strict obedience to Biblical Judaism, and to the Jewish customs and traditions ... Hebrew, taught through the Torah texts by rabbis and teachers who came especially from Yemen."

=== Piyyutim ===
The Jews of Cochin had a long tradition of singing piyyutim (devotionals) and songs on festive occasions such as Purim. Women used to sing Jews songs in Judeo-Malayalam. They did not adhere to the Talmudic prohibition against public singing by women (see: Tzniut#Female singing voice).

== Judeo-Malayalam ==
Judeo-Malayalam (Malayalam: യെഹൂദ്യമലയാളം, romanized: yehūdyamalayāḷaṃ; Hebrew: מלאיאלאם יהודית, romanized: malayalam yəhūḏīṯ) is the traditional language of the Kochinim, spoken today by a few dozens of people in Israel and by probably fewer than 25 in India. In their antiquity, Malabar Jews may have used Judeo-Persian as evident from the Kollam Copper plates.

Judeo-Malayalam is the only known Dravidian Jewish language. Since it does not differ substantially in grammar or syntax from other colloquial Malayalam dialects, it is not considered by many linguists to be a language in its own right, but a dialect, or simply a language variation. Judeo-Malayalam shares with other Jewish languages like Ladino, Judeo-Arabic, and Yiddish, common traits and features. For example, verbatim translations from Hebrew to Malayalam, archaic features of Old Malayalam, Hebrew components agglutinated to Dravidian verb and noun formations and special idiomatic usages based on its Hebrew loanwords. Due to the lack of long-term scholarship on this language variation, there is no separate designation for the language (if it can be so considered), for it to have its own language code (see also SIL and ISO 639).

Unlike many Jewish languages, Judeo-Malayalam is not written using the Hebrew alphabet. It does, however, like most Jewish languages, contain many Hebrew loanwords, which are regularly transliterated, as much as possible, using the Malayalam script. Like many other Jewish languages, Judeo-Malayalam also contains a number of lexical, phonological and syntactic archaisms, in this case, from the days before Malayalam became fully distinguished from Tamil.

Malayalam Transliteration	Meaning	Original Form	Pronunciation
അളം	world	עולם	oˈlam
അലിയ	ascension	עלייה	aliyá
അലുവ/ഹലുവ	sweet	חלבה	halvah
ബാ	come	בא	ba
ബേത് ക്‌നേസേത്	synagogue	בית כנסת	beit-k'néset
ഇവിരീത്	Hebrew language	עברית	ivrít
കബറ്	grave, tomb	קבר	kéver
മിശ്രേം, മിശ്രീം	Egypt, Egyptian	מצרים, מצרי	mitsráyim, mitsrí
മെത്ത	bed	מיטה	metah
നവി	prophet	נביא	naví
റബ്ബാൻ, രമ്പാൻ	rabbi, teacher, monk	רבי	rabbi
സായിത്ത്	olive	זית	záyit
സഫറാദ്, സഫറാദി	Spain, Spaniard	ספרד, ספרדי	sfarad, sfaradi
ശാലോം	hello, peace	שלום	shalóm
ശാലോം ആയി	death	שלום עליי	shalóm ali
ശീർ	song, music	שיר	shir
ശോഷന്നാ	lily	שושן	shoshán
തപ്പുവാഖ്	apple	תפוח	tapúakh
തോറ	Torah	תורה	torá
യവൻ, യാവന	Greece, Greek (Likely to be derived from "Ionian", the Greeks who lived in Asia Minor)	יוון, יווני	yaván, yevani
യിസ്രായേൽ, യിസ്രായേലി	Israel, Israeli	ישראל, הישראלי	yisra'él, yisra'éli
യൂദാ, യെഹൂദൻ	Jew, Jewish	יהודי	y'hudi

== Cochin Jewish synagogues ==
A synagogue is called a bētu knēsētu in Judeo-Malayalam (ബേത് ക്‌നേസേത്), from Hebrew bet knesset, or a Jūtapalli (ജൂതപള്ളി), with Jūtaṉ meaning Jew and -palli a suffix added to prayer houses of the Abrahamic faiths.

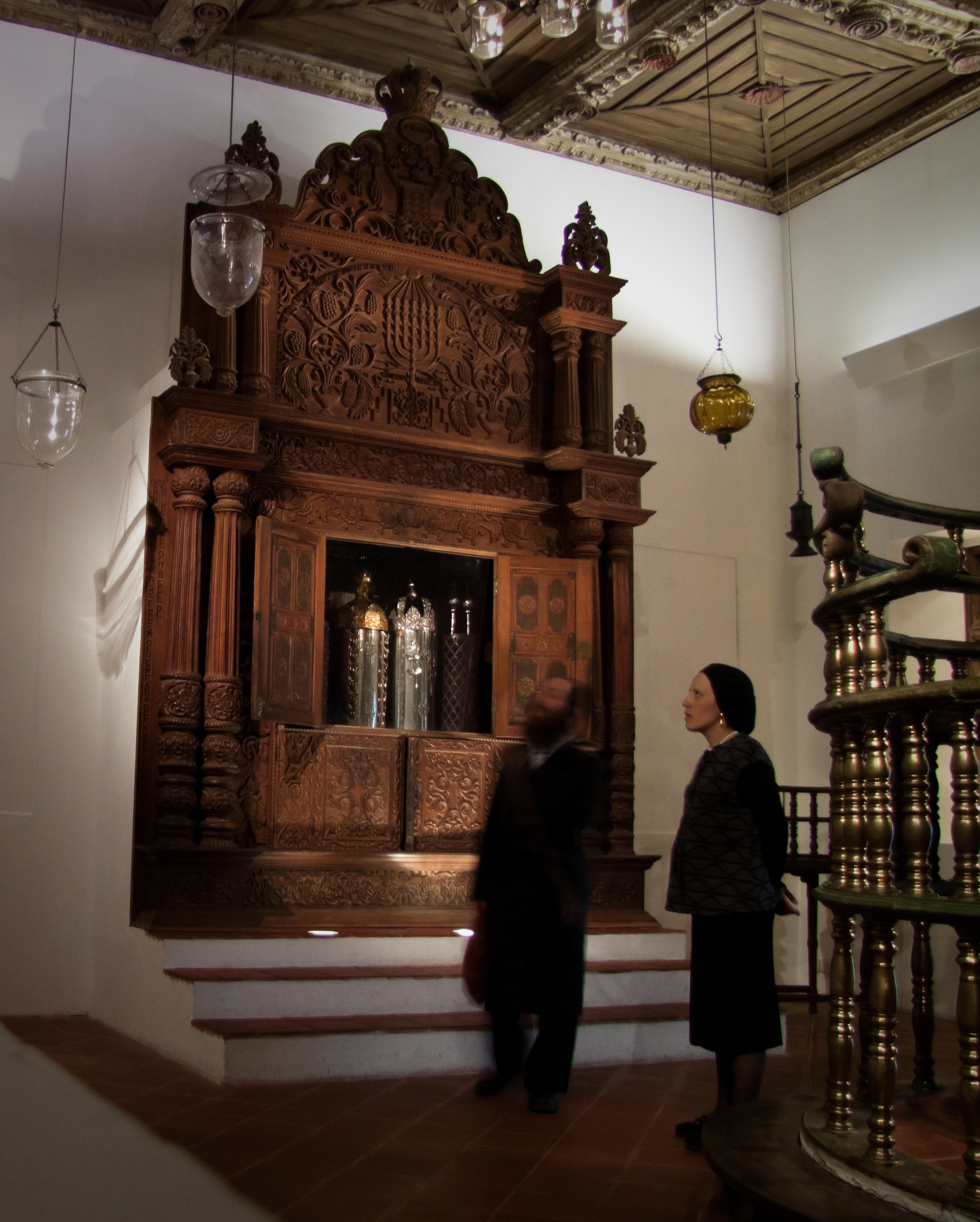
The ark and Bema of the Paravur Synagogue are now displayed in the Israel Museum in Jerusalem

Throughout history, numerous synagogues have been constructed and lost to time. In their first settlement at Shingly (Kodungallur), there were 18 synagogues as per their oral traditions. Today, no archaeological evidence has been yet uncovered to validate these traditions. However, the custom of naming their synagogues as Tekkŭmbhagam (South-side) and Kaṭavumbhagam "Riverbank-side" is cited as a cultural memory of two such synagogues that once stood in Muziris. Several oral songs sung by Kochini women also contain references to these synagogues.

In addition, numerous Syrian Christian churches of the Saint Thomas Christians community in Kerala are claimed to have been built on former synagogues, although archaeological evidence is scarce.

Synagogues believed to have existed or speculated based on oral traditions include:

- Madayi Synagogue, Madayi
- Cranganore Synagogue, Shingly
- Thekkumbhagam synagogue, Shingly
- Kadavumbhagam Synagogue, Shingly

Synagogues in recorded history whose location and/or remains have been lost in time:

- Palayoor Synagogue, Palur (known only from a rimon (ornament) bearing its name)
- Kokkamangalam Synagogue, Kokkamangalam
- Kochangadi Synagogue,(1344 A.D - 1789 A.D) Kochangadi (oldest synagogue in recorded history)
- Saudi Synagogue, (1514 A.D-1556 A.D), Saude, a locality south of Fort Kochi.
- Tir-Tur Synagogue, (1745 A.D-1768 A.D) Thiruthur, Kochi
- Muttam Synagogue (1800A.D), Muttam, Alappuzha
- Fort Kochi Synagogue, (1848 A.D), Fort Kochi (congregation of meschuhrarim)
- Seremban Synagogue, Seremban, Malaysia

Extant synagogues in Kerala:

- Kadavumbhagam Mattancherry Synagogue, (1130 A.D or 1539 A.D), Mattanchery
- Thekkumbhagam Mattancherry Synagogue, (1647 A.D), Mattanchery (demolished in 1960's)
- Chendamangalam Synagogue, (1420 or 1614 A.D), Chendamangalam
- Mala Synagogue, (1400 A.D or 1597 A.D), Mala
- Paravur Synagogue, (1164 A.D or 1616 A.D), Parur
- Kadavumbhagam Ernakulam Synagogue, (1200 A.D), Ernakulam
- Thekkumbhagam Ernakulam Synagogue, (1200 A.D or 1580 A.D), Ernakulam
- Paradesi Synagogue, (1568 A.D), Mattancherry (oldest active synagogue)

Cochini synagogues in Israel:

- Moshav Nevatim Synagogue, Nevatim (interiors taken from Thekkumbhagam Ernakulam Synagogue)
- Mesilat Zion Synagogue, Mesilat Zion
- Nehemiah Motta Synagogue, Giv'at Ko'ah

== Cochin Jewish surnames ==
List of Cochin Jewish names and surnames (partial)
- Aaron/Aharon
- Abraham/Avraham/Ibrahim
- Ashkenazi
- Azar
- Bezalel
- Ben/Bin/Binu
- Benyamin/Binyamin/Benjamin
- Cohen/Coen
- Daniel
- David/Davidson
- Dharan
- Efraim/Evarayi
- Elia/Elias/Eliyahu
- Esther
- Gershon
- Hai/Hay
- Hallegua
- Iype
- Mundakathil
- Itzhak/Yitzhak
- Japheth
- Joy
- Kalloor/Kallookaran/Kallooran
- Koder
- Kunjeli
- Libi
- Madayi
- Mathiyahu/Mathai/Matthew
- Meir
- Menahem
- Meyuhasheem
- Mordekhai/Mordechai/Mordehay
- Motta
- Murdai
- Mutas/Mutach/Mutath/Mutat
- Nehemia/Nehemya
- Oran/Oren
- Palliparambil
- Pallivathikal/Palivathukal
- Rabban
- Rahabi
- Roby/Rubi
- Salem
- Samuel
- Sargon
- Sarphati
- Sassoon
- Sharet/Chorath
- Siji
- Simon
- Solomon/Shlomo/Shalomon
- Thomas
- Tifferet
- Yaakov
- Yoshua/Joshua
- Yohanan/Johanan/John
- Yoseph/Joseph/Josephai
- Zackai

== Notable Cochin Jews ==
- Joseph Rabban, the first leader of the Jewish community of Kodungallur, was given copper plates of special grants from the Chera ruler Bhaskara Ravivarman II from Kerala
- Eliyah ben Moses Adeni, a 17th century Hebrew poet from Cochin.
- Ezekiel Rahabi (1694–1771), chief Jewish merchant of the Dutch East India Company in Cochin
- Abraham Barak Salem (1882–1967), Cochin Jewish Indian nationalist leader
- Ruby Daniel (1912-2002), Indian-Israeli author and subject of Ruby of Cochin
- Sarah Jacob Cohen (1922-2019), the oldest member of the Paradesi community

== Gallery ==
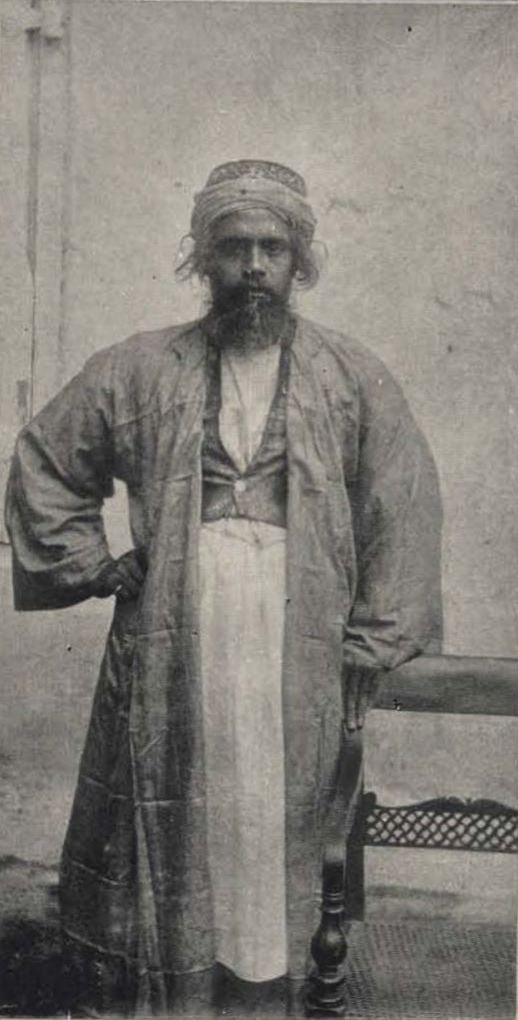
A high Priest of the Malabar Jews

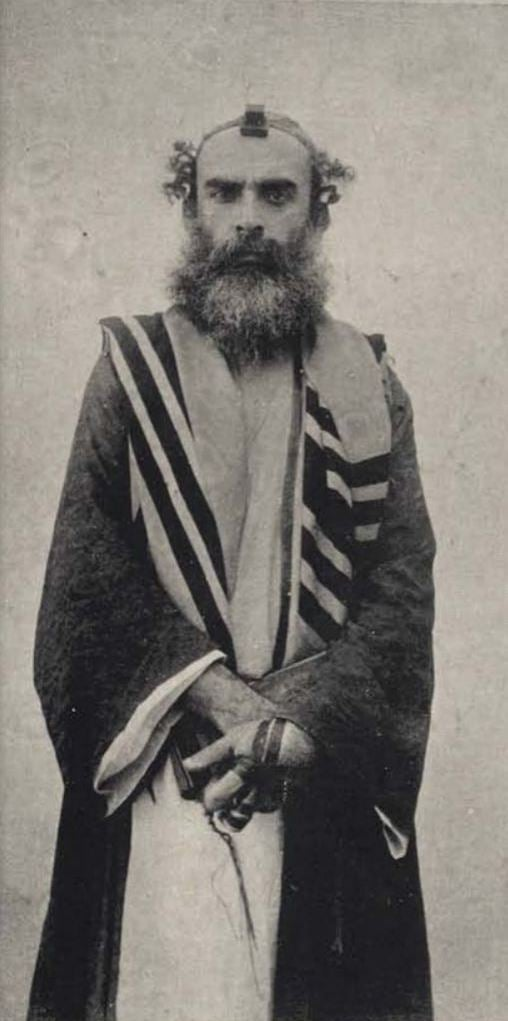
A Paradesi Jew of Baghdadi Origin

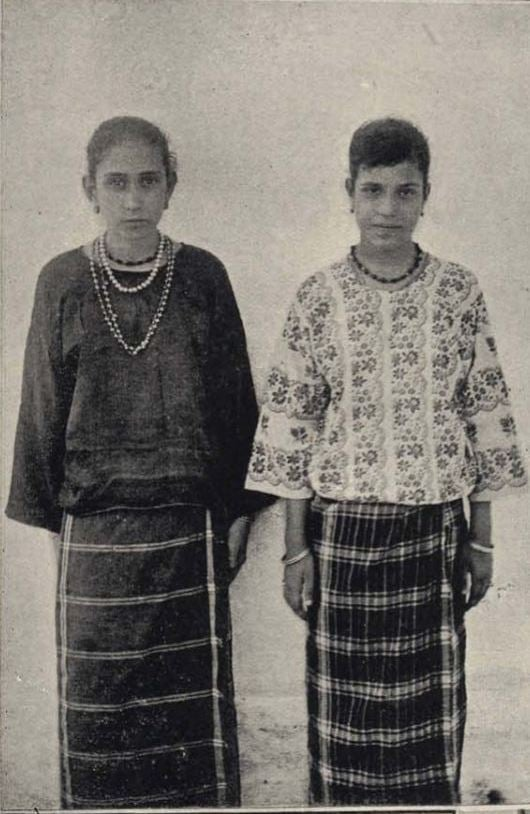
Two Young Achi's (Jewess in Malayalam)

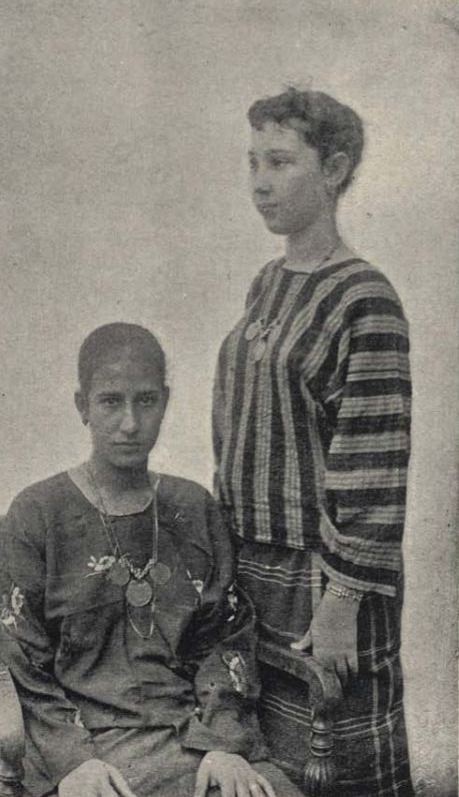
Two Achi's (Jewess in Malayalam)

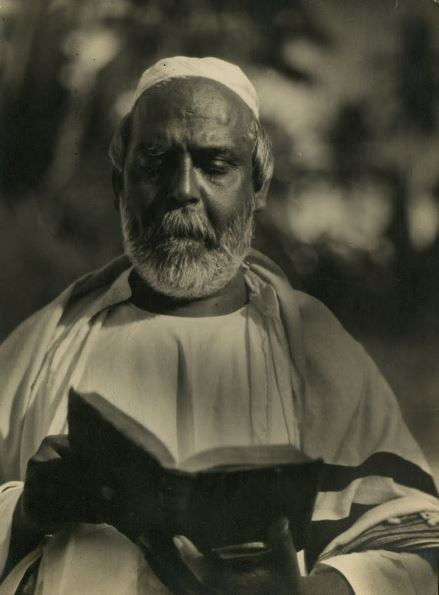
A Malabar Jew, circa 1920's

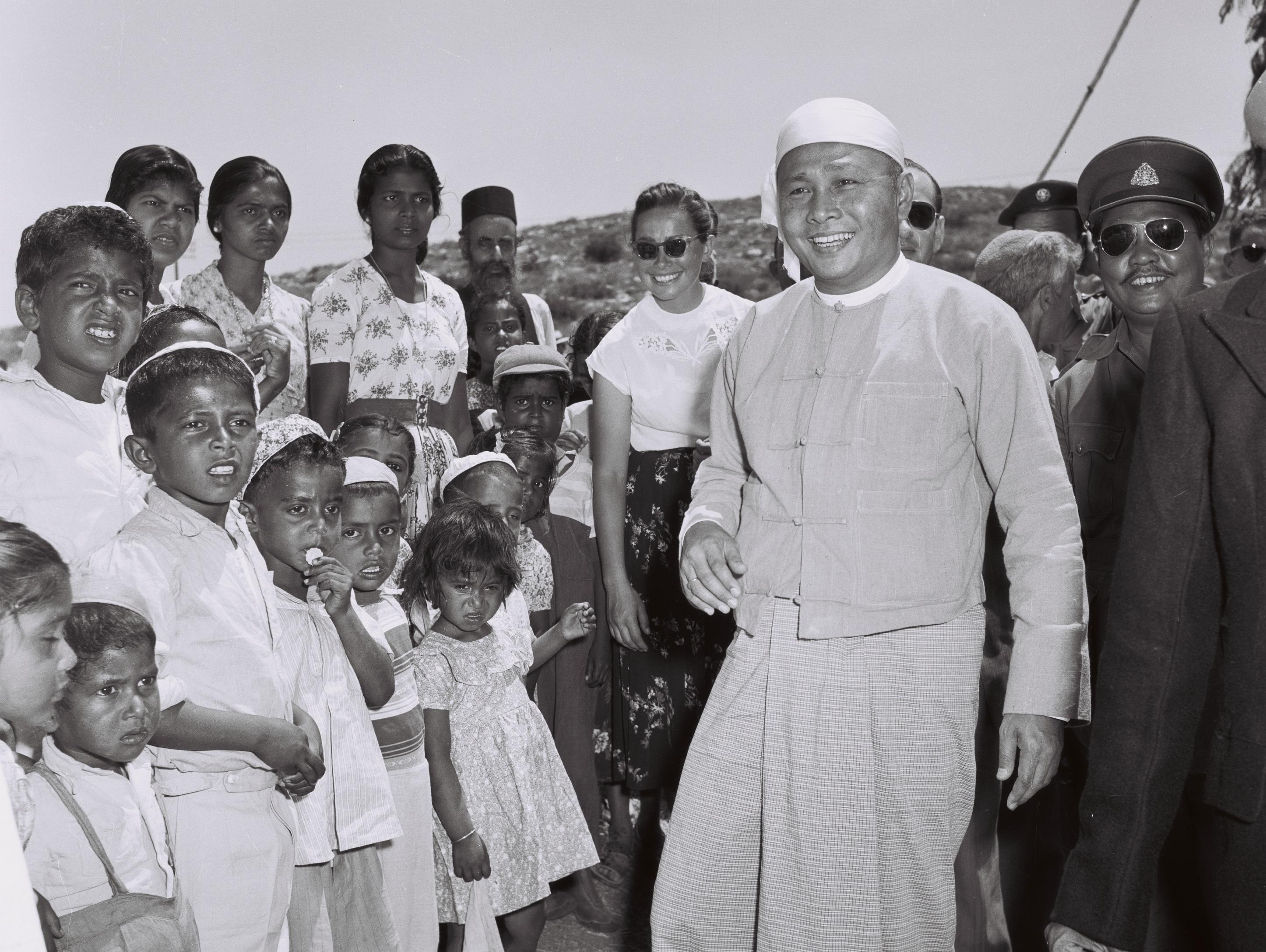

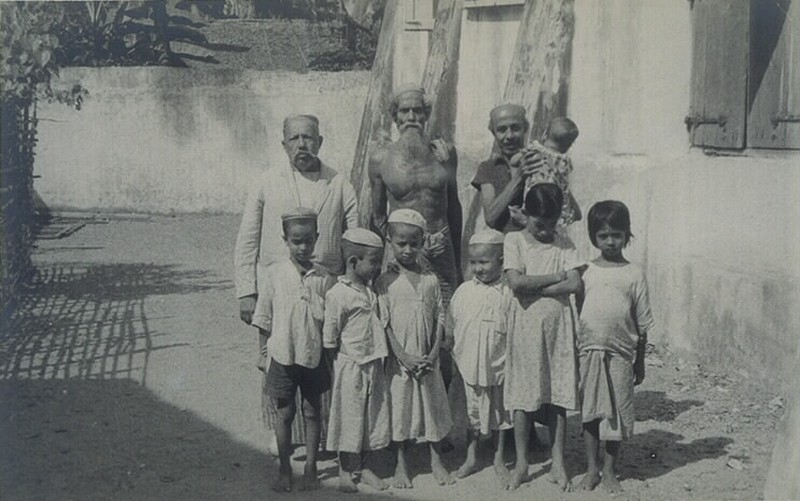

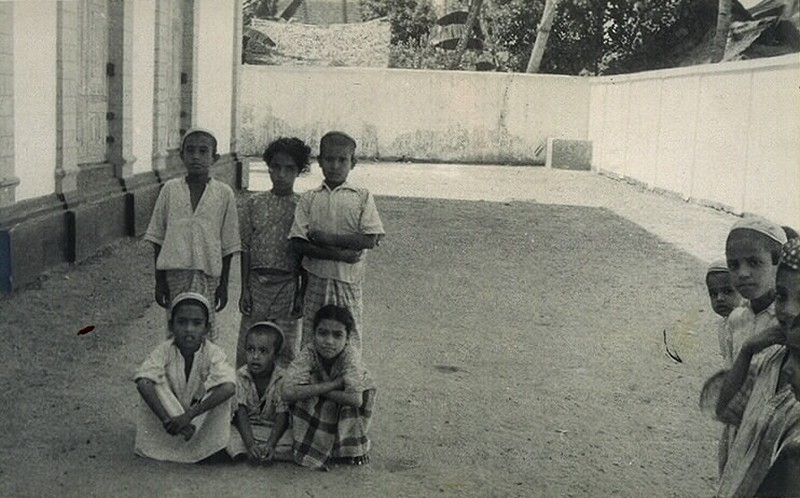

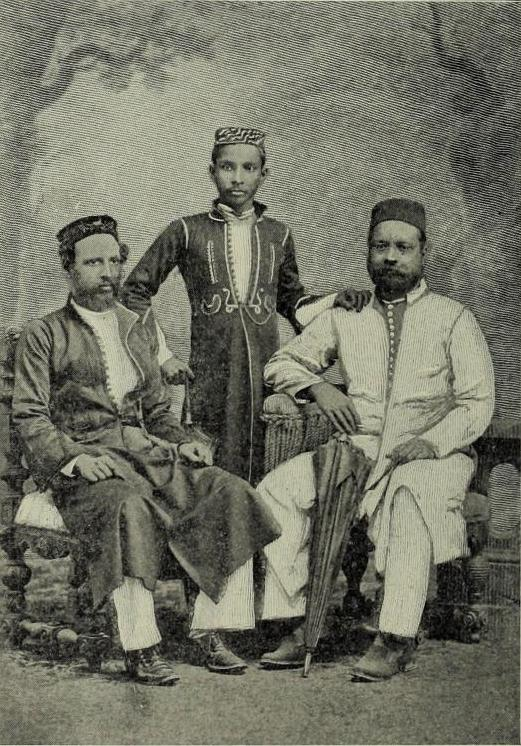

== See also ==
- List of Synagogues in Kerala
- History of the Jews in India
- Meshuchrarim
- Paradesi Jews
- Abraham Barak Salem
- Joseph Rabban
- Judaism
- Anjuvannam
