= Joseph Azar =

Joseph Azar is the name of:

- Joseph Azar (prince) (fl. 14th century), prominent Jewish merchant chief on the Malabar Coast, India
- Joseph Azar (singer) (born 1942), Lebanese artist and singer
