= Joseph Azar (merchant) =

Jewish merchant and aristocrat in south India

Joseph Azar (fl. 14th century CE?) was a Jewish merchant and aristocrat in Kochi (Cochin), on the Malabar Coast in south India. He was a descendant of Joseph Rabban, a prominent merchant on the Malabar Coast in early 11th century CE. According to tradition, Azar was a member of one of the leading Jewish families — along with the Zakkars and the Aarons — that fled from Kodungallur (Muyirikode) to Kochi in the 14th century.

Tradition sometimes also dates Joseph Azar to the 16th century CE.

In 1340, Joseph Azar became embroiled in a succession dispute with his brother. The ensuing strife led to the intervention of neighboring potentates and the end of exclusive Jewish privileges on the Malabar Coast. According to local tradition, Kochi's first synagogue was built there in 1344 by Joseph Azar.

== See also ==
- Cochin Jews
