= Ruby Daniel =

Indian Navy personnel and song translator (1912–2002)

Ruby "Rivka" Daniel
- רובי "רבקה" דניאל
- Born: Ruby Daniel; December 1912; Cochin, Kingdom of Cochin, British India
- Died: 23 September 2002 (aged 89); Neot Mordekhai, Israel
- Occupations: Indian Navy; writer; translator
- Parent(s): Eliyahu Hai Daniel (d. 1934) and Leah Japheth Daniel (1892–1982)

Ruby "Rivka" Daniel (Hebrew: רובי "רבקה" דניאל; December 1912 – 23 September 2002) was a Malayali of Cochin Jewish heritage, the first Malayali woman in the Indian Navy, and the first Cochin Jewish woman to publish a book. Between the years of 1982–1999 Daniel translated into English over 120 Judeo-Malayalam women's songs. Her translation efforts led the way for an ongoing international project to translate and analyze the songs within the Cochin Jewish community.

== Early life ==
Ruby Daniel was born in Kochi, India and was the eldest child of Eliyahu Hai Daniel and Leah Japheth Daniel. Her father, Eliyahu Hai Daniel, sold tickets for the ferry boat which connected Cochin with Ernakulam. Ruby had two younger siblings – Bingley and Rahel. Ruby also lived with her maternal grandparents, Eliyahu and Rivka ("Docho") Japheth.

Ruby Daniel excelled in school, both at the local government school for girls and at the Jewish school where she studied Hebrew, Torah, and the synagogue liturgy every morning and afternoon. She attended St. Treasas Convent Girls Higher Secondary School in Ernakulam. She completed high school there and studied one year at St. Teresa's College. She left St. Teresa's College after her father and grandfather died in the same year.

== Military career ==
Ruby Daniel enlisted in the military and served in the Armed Forces of India. She is noted for not only being one of the few women in the Indian army at the time but also as the first Jewish Indian woman and the first Malayali to do so in modern Indian history. She was employed for over fifteen years in government service, as a clerk in the High Court, District Court Munsiff Court, and from 1944 to 1946 in the Women's Royal Indian Navy.

== Writing career ==
She made aliyah in 1951 and moved to the predominantly Ashkenazi and secular kibbutz Neot Mordechai. Her 1995 memoir, "Ruby of Cochin", lists a fourth method for marriage among the Jews of Cochin: that of witness by the entire congregation to a marriage. The memoir includes her experience in the Armed Forces of India as a Jewish woman among Hindu and Muslim men. In order to preserve Cochin Jewish culture, Ruby Daniel published a booklet of nine songs in Judeo-Malayalam – transliterated in Hebrew. She worked prodigiously through the 1990s to translated some 130 songs, which are sung by the Jewish women, into English.

=== Works ===
- We Learned from the Grandparents: Memories of a Cochin Jewish Woman. 1992
- Ruby of Cochin .Jewish Publication Society (JPS). 1995
