= Elijah ha-Adeni =

Elijah ha-Adeni (Hebrew: אליה העדני) was a rabbi and payyetan of Kochi, India, originally from Aden. He wrote Azharot (Amsterdam, 1688), a liturgical poem on the 613 commandments, which is traditionally recited by Kochi Jews on Shemini Atzeret.

== Publications ==
- Seder Azharot. Amsterdam. 1688.
