= Sarah Jacob Cohen =

Cochin Jewish hand embroiderer (1922–2019)

- Born: 4 September 1922
- Died: 30 August 2019 (aged 96); Mattancherry, Kochi, Kerala, India
- Known for: Oldest Kerala Jew
- Spouse: Jacob Cohen

Sarah Jacob Cohen (September 4, 1922 – August 30, 2019) was the oldest living member of Kochi’s Jewish community, visited by The British royal family at Mattancherry, Kochi in November 2013. She was a prominent member of the Jewish community that arrived in Mattancherry, Kochi, in the south Indian state of Kerala over 500 years ago, from Europe. She was dedicated to keeping alive simple Jewish traditions like kippah making in a far flung Jewish outpost. Cohen had a number of relatives living in Israel, including brother Joseph and sister Hanny, as well as half siblings who lived across the globe. She died on August 30, 2019, at the age of 96.
