= Shelomo Salem Shurrabi =

Shelomo Salem Shurrabi (late 18th century – 17 April 1856) was ḥakham of the Bene Israel community of Bombay.

== Biography ==
Shelomo Salem Shurrabi was born in Cochin at the end of the eighteenth century, into a family of Yemenite Jewish descent.

While on a voyage from Cochin to Bombay with his maternal grandfather, Meyer Serfadi, about 1836–8, he was shipwrecked at Navgaon. He was found by Jacob Aaron Sanker, a Bene Israel soldier, who secured for him employment as a bookbinder. Shurrabi showed considerable knowledge of Jewish lore, and, being able to cantillate the service attractively, was appointed ḥazzan of the new synagogue at a salary of 100 rupees per annum, and as such he instructed the Bene Israel in the traditions of their faith.

Shurrabi obtained great influence with the Bene Israel. Through his efforts new synagogues were founded in Bombay and Revdanda in 1846, Alibag in 1848, and Panwell in 1849.
