= Siona Benjamin =

Indian-American artist (born 1960)

Siona Benjamin (born 11 December 1960) is an Indian-American artist originally from Mumbai, India and now residing in the New York City area.

== Background ==
Siona Benjamin (Kasukar) is originally from Bombay, now living in the New York City area. Her signature work as a multicultural artist reflects her background of being brought up Jewish in a predominantly Hindu and Muslim India. In her paintings, she combines the imagery of her past with the role she plays in America today, making a mosaic of underlying meaning inspired by both Indian miniature paintings and Sephardic icons. She has her first MFA in painting and a second MFA in Theater set design. She has exhibited in the US, Canada, Europe, India, and Asia.

Siona has been awarded two Fulbright Fellowships: in Fall 2016, Siona embarked on a new project to take place in Israel titled Motherland to Fatherland: Indian Transcultural Jews; in 2010–11, Siona was awarded an art project titled Faces: Weaving Indian Jewish Narratives. Research for this project was conducted in India, and the first exhibition took place in October 2013 at the Prince of Wales museum in Mumbai, India.

Her work has been featured in a variety of media including: The New York Times, The Chicago Tribune, The Philadelphia Inquirer, The Financial Times, The Jewish Week in NYC and NJ, The Boston Globe, The St. Louis Gazette, Art in America, Art New England, Art and Antiques, ArtNews, and Moment magazine. In March 2024, her art was also featured in a new book called The Blue Butterfly of Cochin, written by author Ariana Mizrachi, edited by the Indian Jewish Heritage Center, http://www.indianjews.org/en/, and published by Kalaniot Books.

Siona's original paintings are available and represented by ACA Galleries in New York City.

== Themes ==
Growing up in India, assimilation was expected in much of her daily life, and so "identity" and "mutual understanding" became major themes in Benjamin's art. Her culturally diverse background informs her approach to art. Her work is influenced by biblical subject matter, reflections on gender and an interest in Midrashic process. Much of her imagery reflects Indian mythology in an effort to reveal what shapes both physical and spiritual identity. In her series "Finding Home", begun in the late 1990s, and in other work, Benjamin colors figures blue. Ori Soltes, professor and curator, comments, "She applies a skin color most frequently associated with a male--the Hindu god, Krishna--to female figures, forcing the viewer to stop and rethink whatever she thought she knew about that association." Also at the core of her work is an ecumenical and empathetic spirit that comes from the very core of Jewish experience. Stylistically amalgamating Indian/Persian miniatures with pop culture, Christian and Jewish illuminated manuscripts, and Jewish and Hindu mythology, Siona also brings her canvas characters to life through animation and performance dance artists. The multicultural, syncretic quality of her art is underlined in the film Blue Like Me, directed by Hal Rifken.

=== Depictions of Women ===
Most of the figures in Benjamin's work are women. A subgroup of the Finding Home series is subtitled "Fereshteh," which means "angel" in Urdu. The major characters in the Fereshteh series are women of the Bible. However, when men appear in this series, they are actually women in the guise of men. Miriam is seen in three works. In one, she is carrying a suitcase and walking—possibly out of Egypt—dressed in traditional Indian attire; in a second, she is ill and surrounded by demons, and in the third, she is shown as a Persian angel caught in a spider's web. Lilith, on the other hand, is shown in three pop art versions. Lilith is traditionally seen as a seductress and a destroyer, but Benjamin views Lilith, Adam's first wife, as also being the first feminist. In one of the works (Finding Home #74 (Fereshteh) "Lilith"), she is wearing a protective amulet that might normally be worn as protection from her, and Lilith's speech balloon says "A thousand of years have I waited keeping the embers of revenge glowing in my heart." She is shown with angel wings and a background of flames. Rachel, Leah, and Esther are amongst others included in the series.

Her 2014 gouache on paper series, The Four Mothers Who Entered Pardes, includes works showing Rachel, Sara, Leah, and Rebecca entering paradise, rather than the four wise men who, according to a Jewish legend, entered Pardes, or Paradise, in the first century C.E.

=== Tikkun olam ===
Few things are more cherished in Jewish tradition than tikkun olam, which translates to "mending the world". Observant Jews practice tikkun olam every day in their thoughts and actions. As Abraham Joshua Herschel has posed when asked, "Who is a Jew?" he replied: "A Jew is a person whose integrity decays when unmoved by the knowledge of wrong done to other people." Through study and reflection, Benjamin has made tikkun olam central to her art.
