= Mesilat Zion =

Mesilat Zion: מסילת ציון (Hebrew)
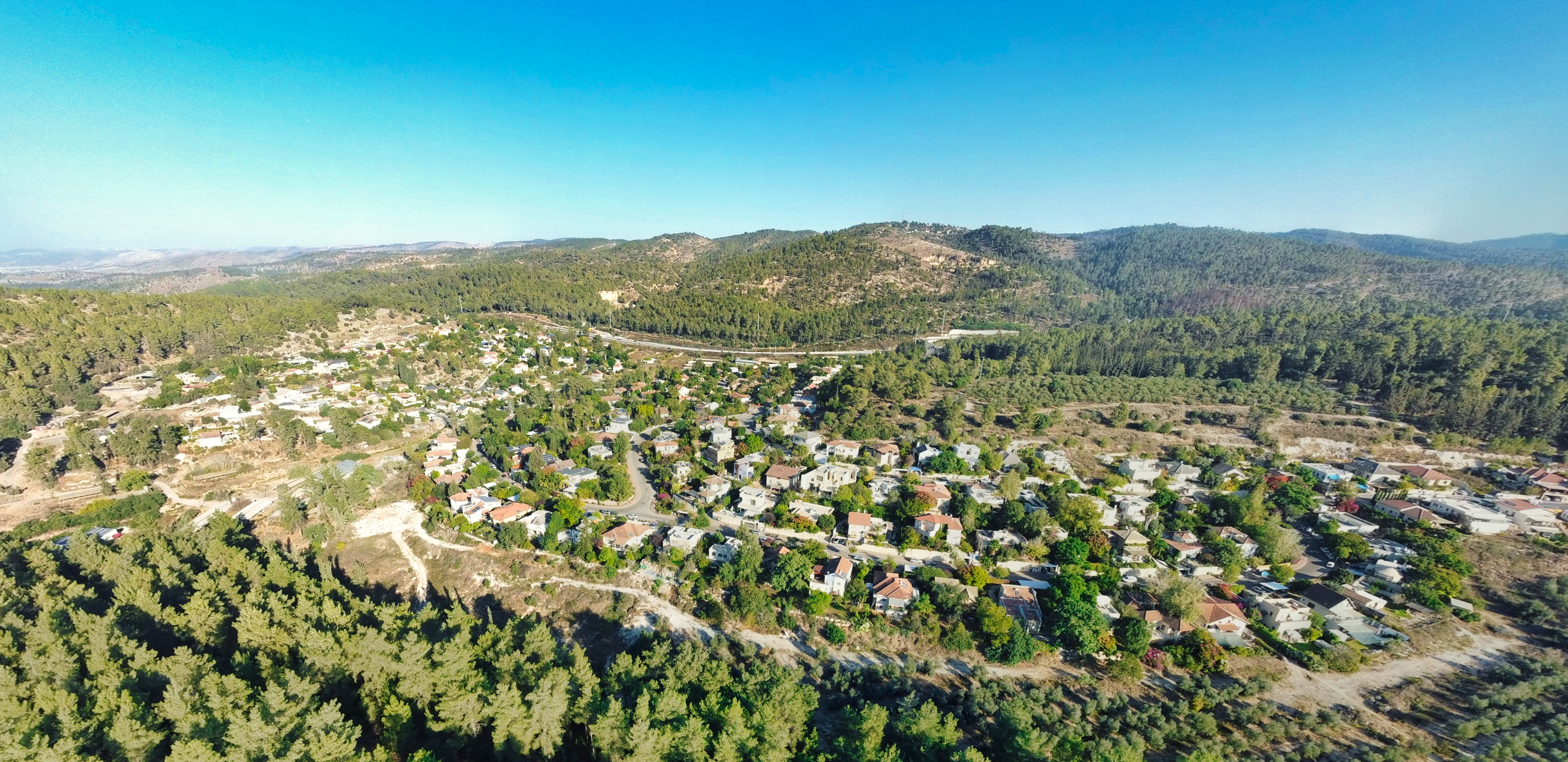
- Etymology: Highway of Zion
- Location within Jerusalem District
- Coordinates: 31°48′6″N 35°0′41″E
- Country: Israel
- District: Jerusalem
- Council: Mateh Yehuda
- Affiliation: Moshavim Movement
- Founded: 1950
- Founder: Yemenite Jews
- Population (2024): 942

Mesilat Zion (Hebrew: מסילת ציון, lit. 'Highway of Zion') is a moshav in central Israel. Located near the city of Beit Shemesh with an area of 1,000 dunams, it falls under the jurisdiction of Mateh Yehuda Regional Council. In 2024 it had a population of 942.

== History ==
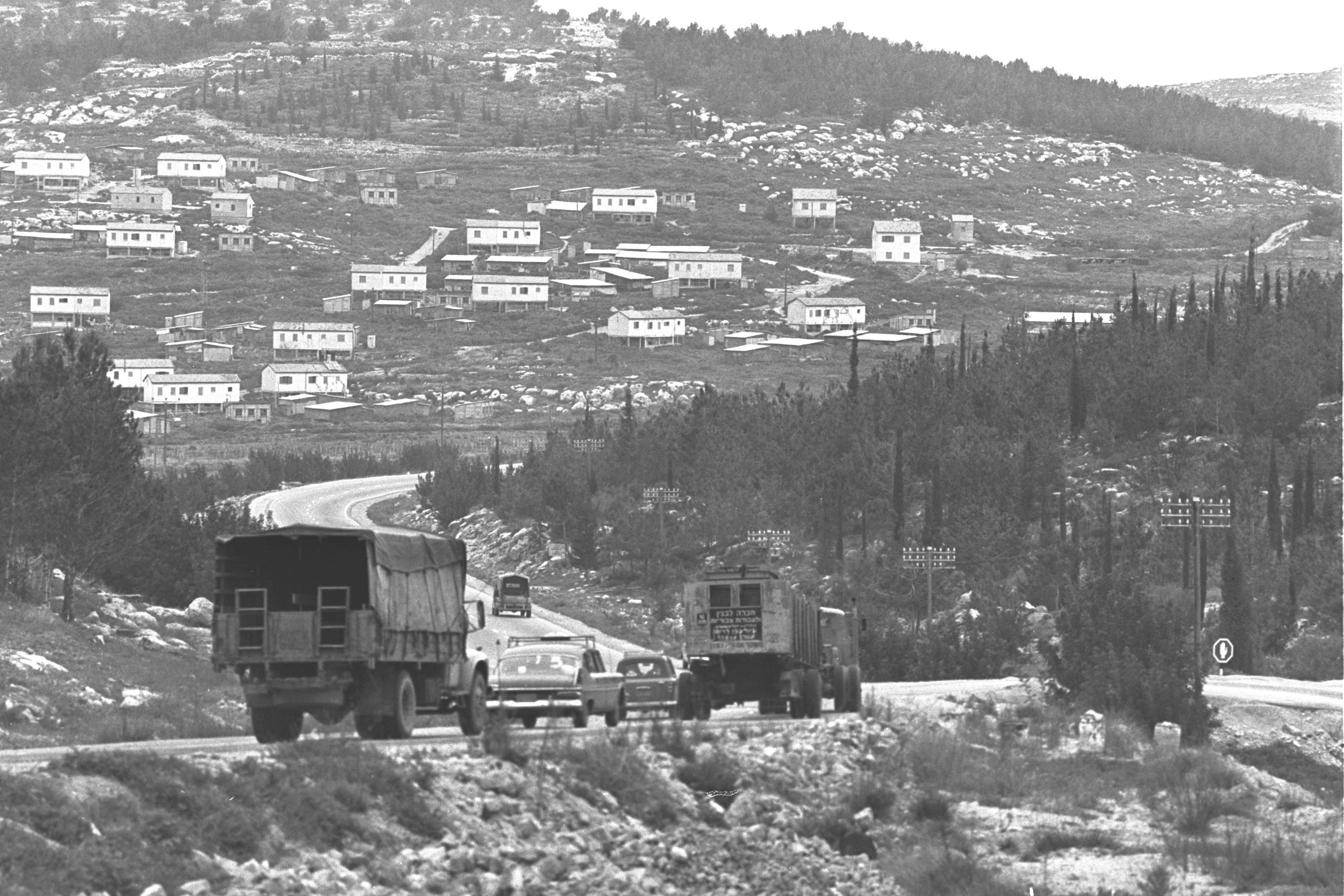
Mesilat Zion, 1964

Mesilat Zion was established on the land of the depopulated Palestinian village of Bayt Mahsir. The moshav was established as a work village in 1950 by immigrants from Yemen. After a few years the founders left and were replaced by Cochin Jews.

The name of the moshav is symbolic, as it is located near the Burma Road. It symbolizes the breaking of the siege over Jerusalem during the 1948 Arab–Israeli War, it is based on verses from the Book of Isaiah, chapter 62, "For Zion's sake will I not hold my peace, and for Jerusalem's sake I will not rest....Go through, go through the gates; prepare ye the way of the people; cast up, cast up the highway; gather out the stones; lift up a standard for the people....Say ye to the daughter of Zion, Behold, thy salvation comes."

The Jerusalem Culinary Institute (JCI) founded in 2001 by chef Yochanan Lambiase is located in Mesilat Zion. JCI is the world's first glatt kosher cooking school.

== Notable residents ==
- Yuval Noah Harari (born 1976), historian, public intellectual, and science writer
- Maya Eshet (born 1990), actress
