= Nevatim =

Moshav in southern Israel

Nevatim: נבטים (Hebrew)
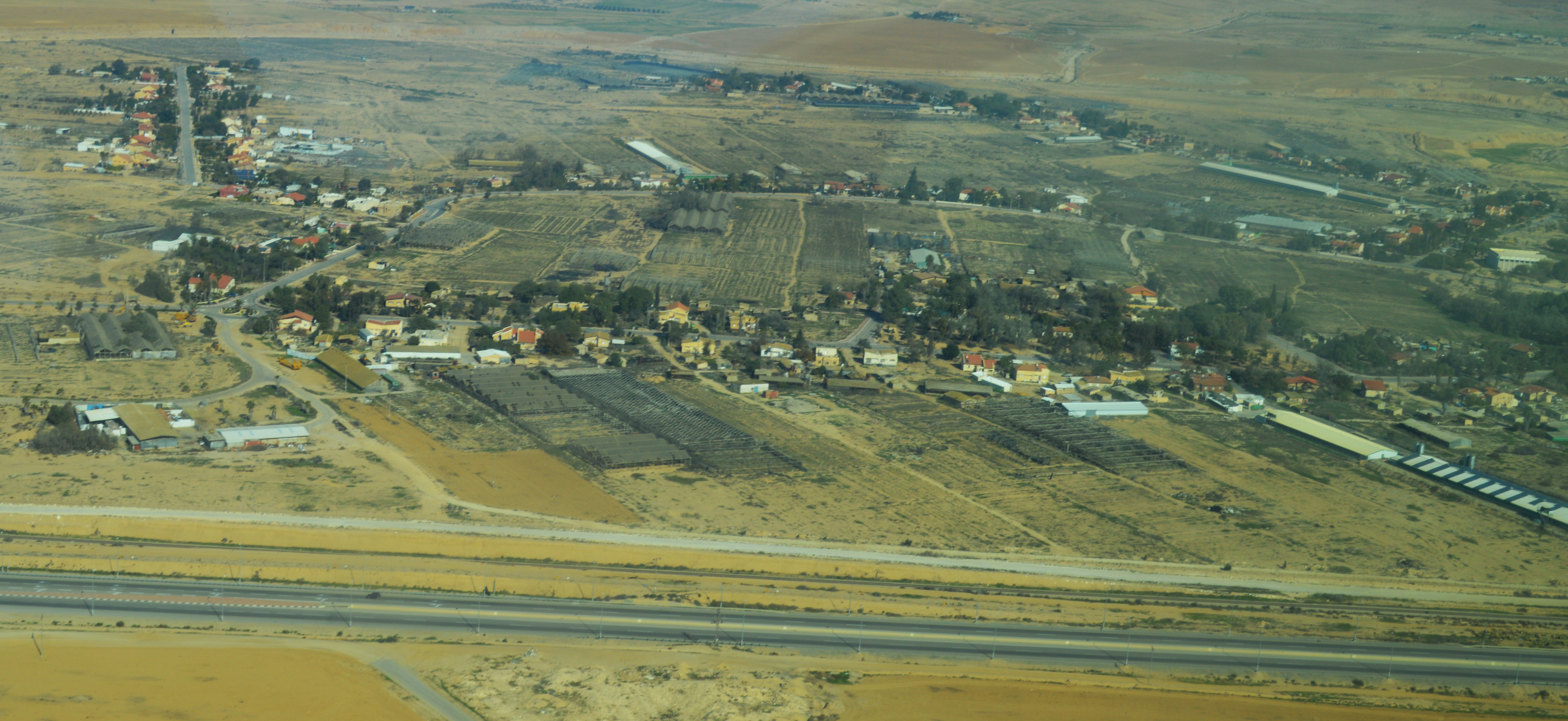
- Etymology: Sprouts
- Location within Northern Negev region of Israel Location within Israel
- Coordinates: 31°13′25″N 34°52′58″E
- Country: Israel
- District: Southern
- Subdistrict: Beersheba
- Council: Bnei Shimon
- Affiliation: Moshavim Movement
- Founded: 1946
- Founder: Hungarian and Cochin Jews
- Population (2024): 1,174
- Website: nevatim.org.il

Nevatim (Hebrew: נבטים, lit. 'Sprouts') is a moshav in southern Israel. Located in the northern Negev desert around 8 km (5 mi) south-east of Beersheba, it falls under the jurisdiction of Bnei Shimon Regional Council. In 2024 it had a population of 1,174.

The nearest settlements are the Bedouin towns of Tel Sheva to the north and Shaqib al-Salam to the south. 10 km (6 mi) to the south-east lies Nevatim Airbase, named after the moshav.

== History ==
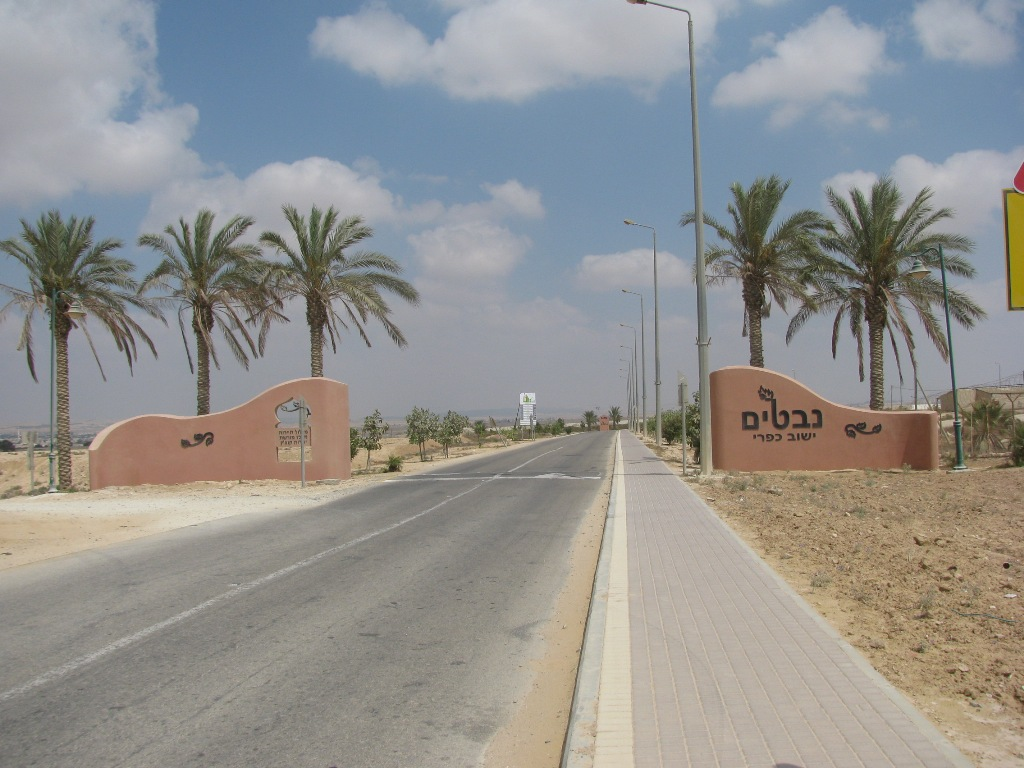
Entrance to Nevatim

Nevatim was originally established in 1946 by Jewish olim from Hungary as one of the 11 points in the Negev, its name taken from the Tanakh. In the 1948 Arab–Israeli War the surrounding area, including the city of Beersheba, was briefly captured by the Egyptian Army.

The Egyptians besieged Nevatim, along with the neighboring village of Beit Eshel which was destroyed and subsequently abandoned. Nevatim managed to hold on throughout the siege, as the villages received air-dropped supplies and most Egyptian efforts were concentrated on continuing northwards.

Although both were dismantled after the war, Nevatim was re-established at a slightly different location in 1954 by Cochin Jews, who had immigrated from Kochi, India.

The community's association with India included installing a monument to Digvijaysinhji Ranjitsinhji Jadeja in late 2025, and being mentioned in Indian Prime Minister Narendra Modi's speech to the Knesset on February 25, 2026.

== Economy ==
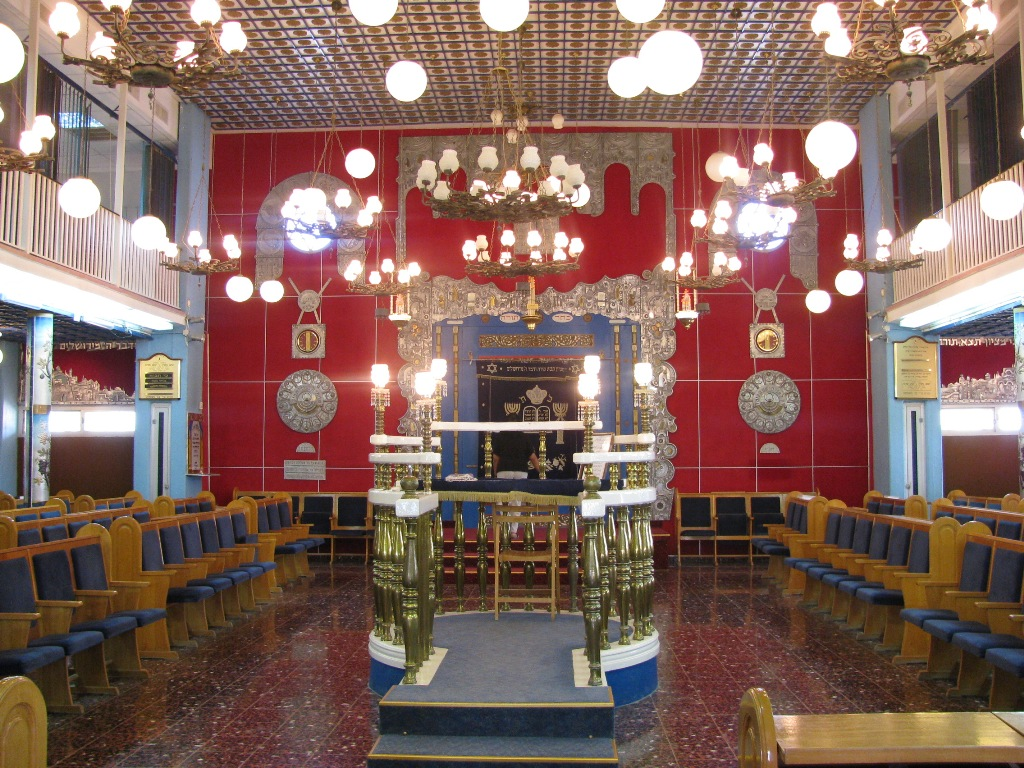
Cochin synagogue, Nevatim

About half of Nevatim's workers are employed in the village, primarily in agriculture, while the rest work in the nearby industrial areas of Beersheba, Dimona and Neot Hovav. Local employment has gradually diversified, especially into the tourism and service, a move sustained by the moshav's guest houses and the Cochin heritage center.

The moshav's synagogue is a duplicate of one in Cochin, and incorporates some elements of the original building. It also houses a cultural center and museum about the Jews of Cochin. A restaurant serving Cochini food and pastries caters to tourists. The community also has a swimming pool and a mikvah.

In May 2017, an extension of the railway from Beersheba to Arad via Kuseife was approved. The line would connect to the existing Beersheba-Dimona rail line at a proposed new rail station at Nevatim.

== Gallery ==
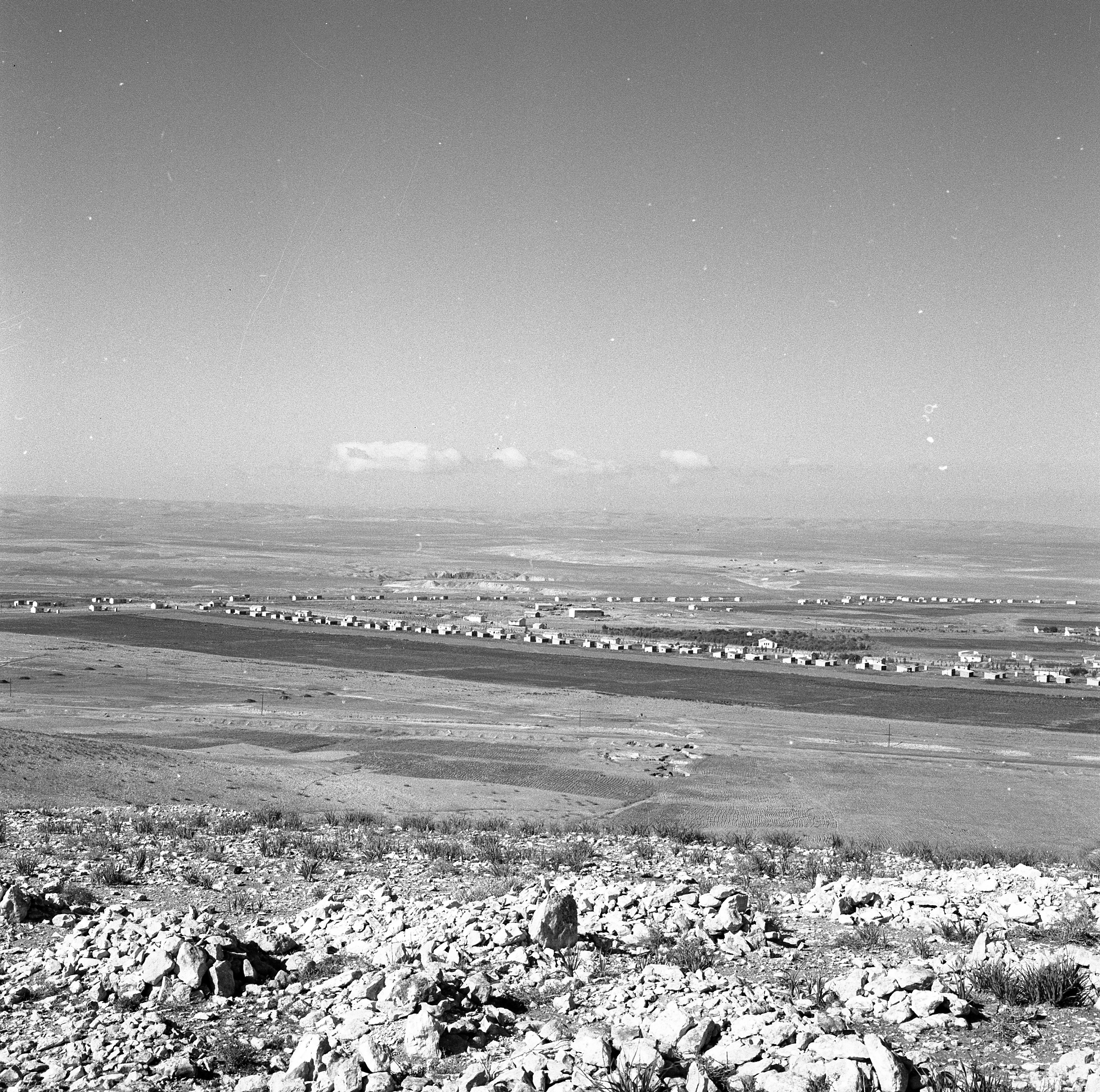
Netavim in 1958

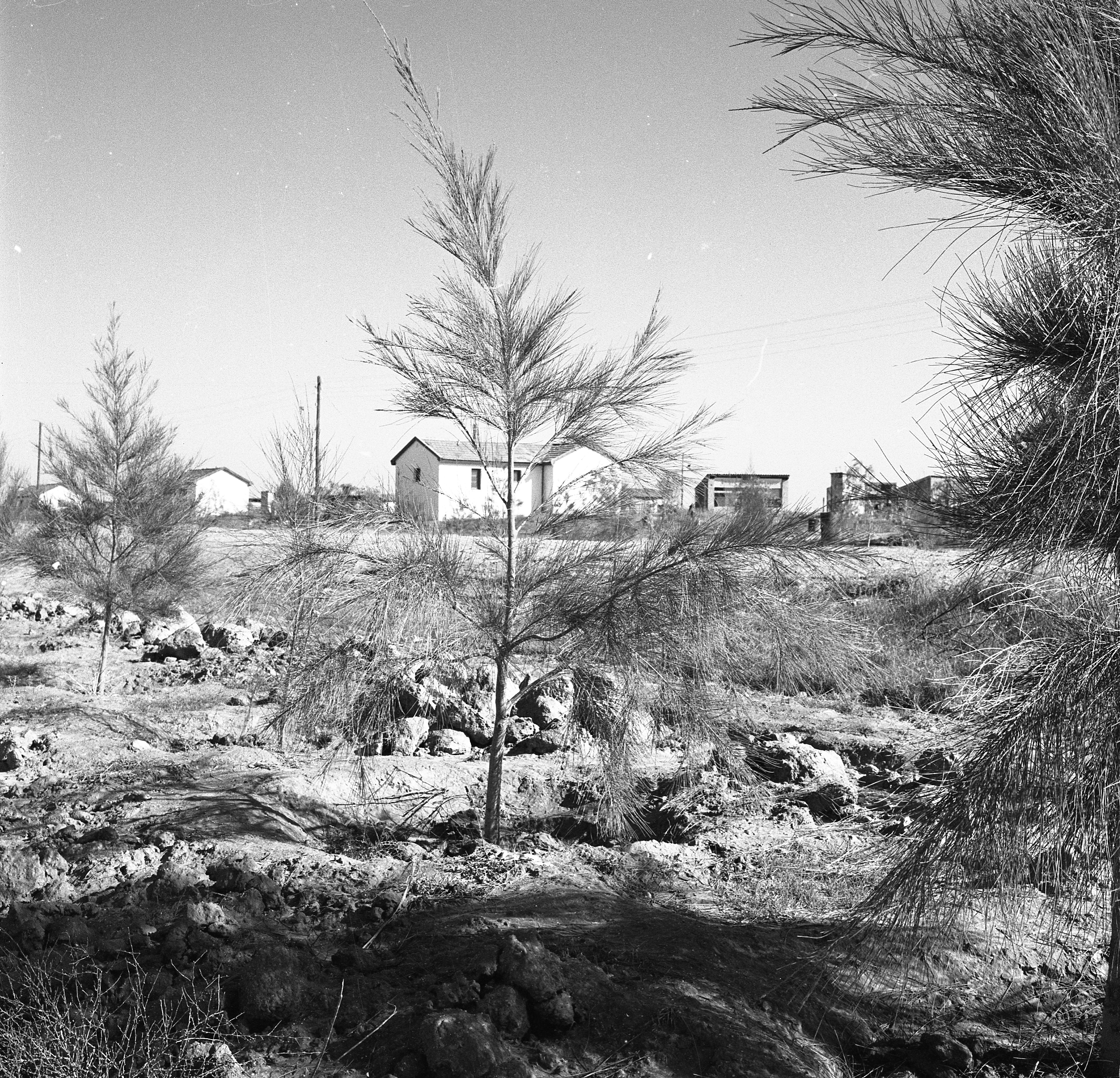
Netavim in 1958

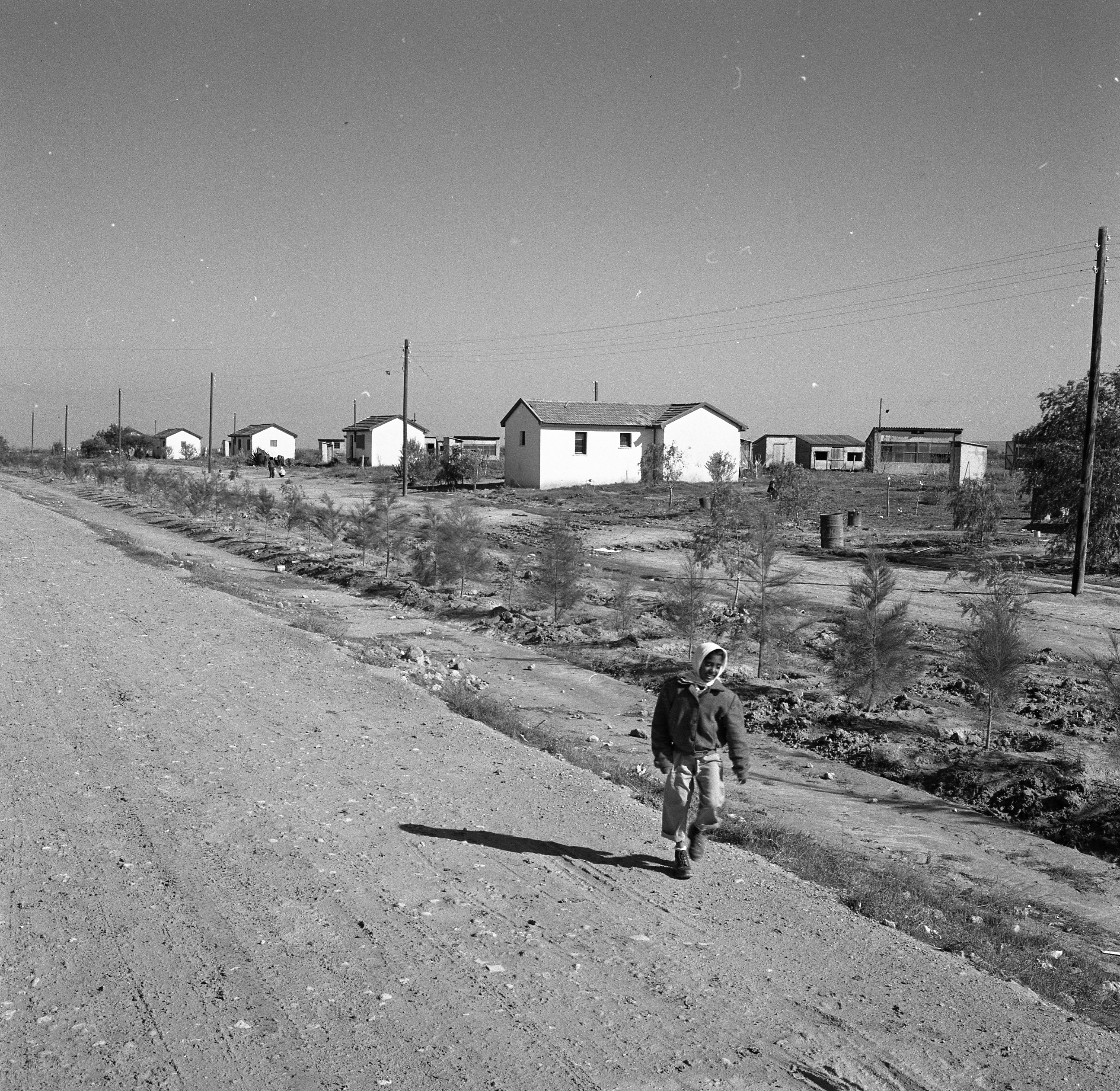
Netavim in 1958

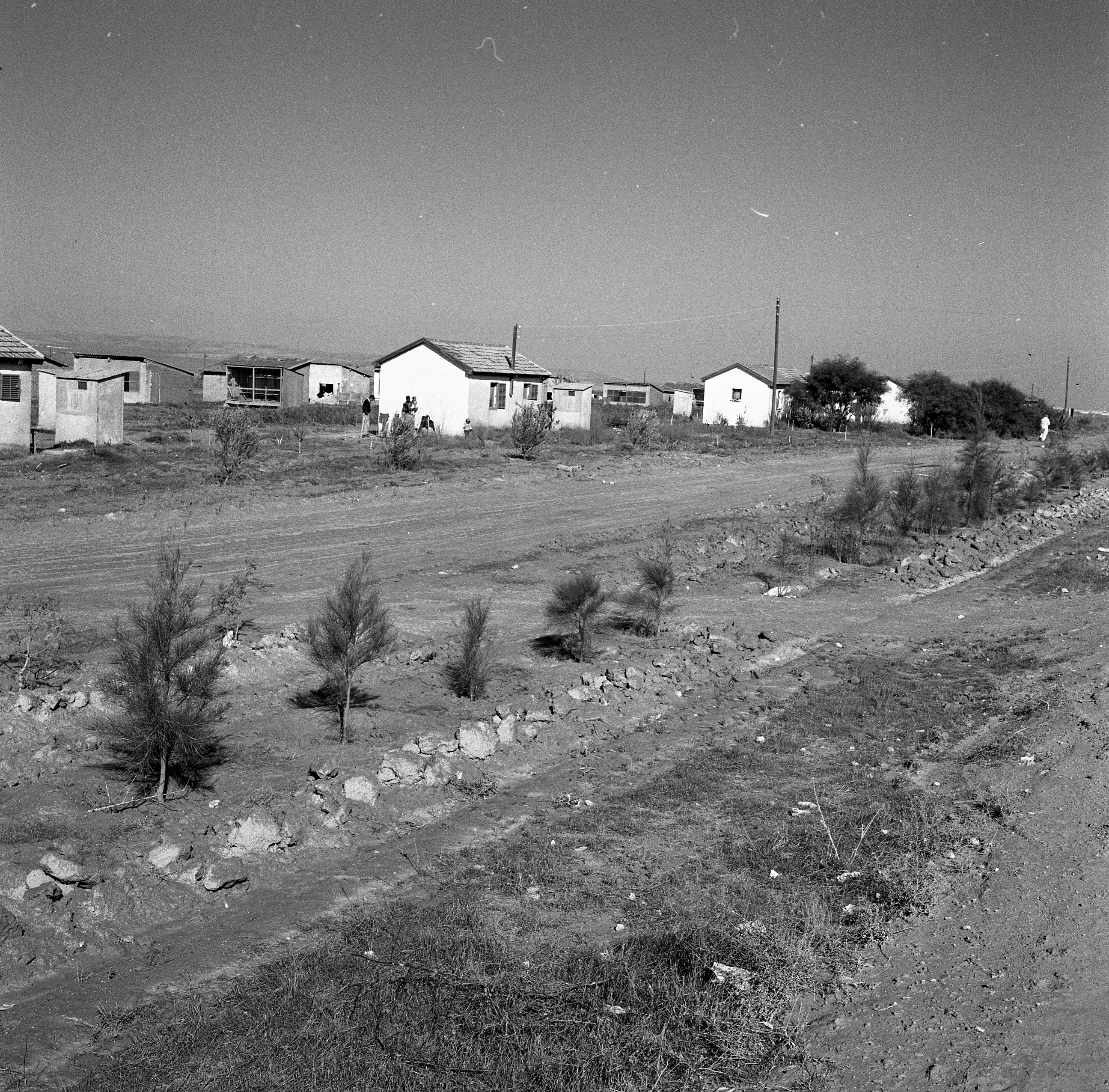
Netavim in 1958
