= Joseph Rabban =

11th-century Jewish merchant in India

- Yusuf/Oueseph Rabban
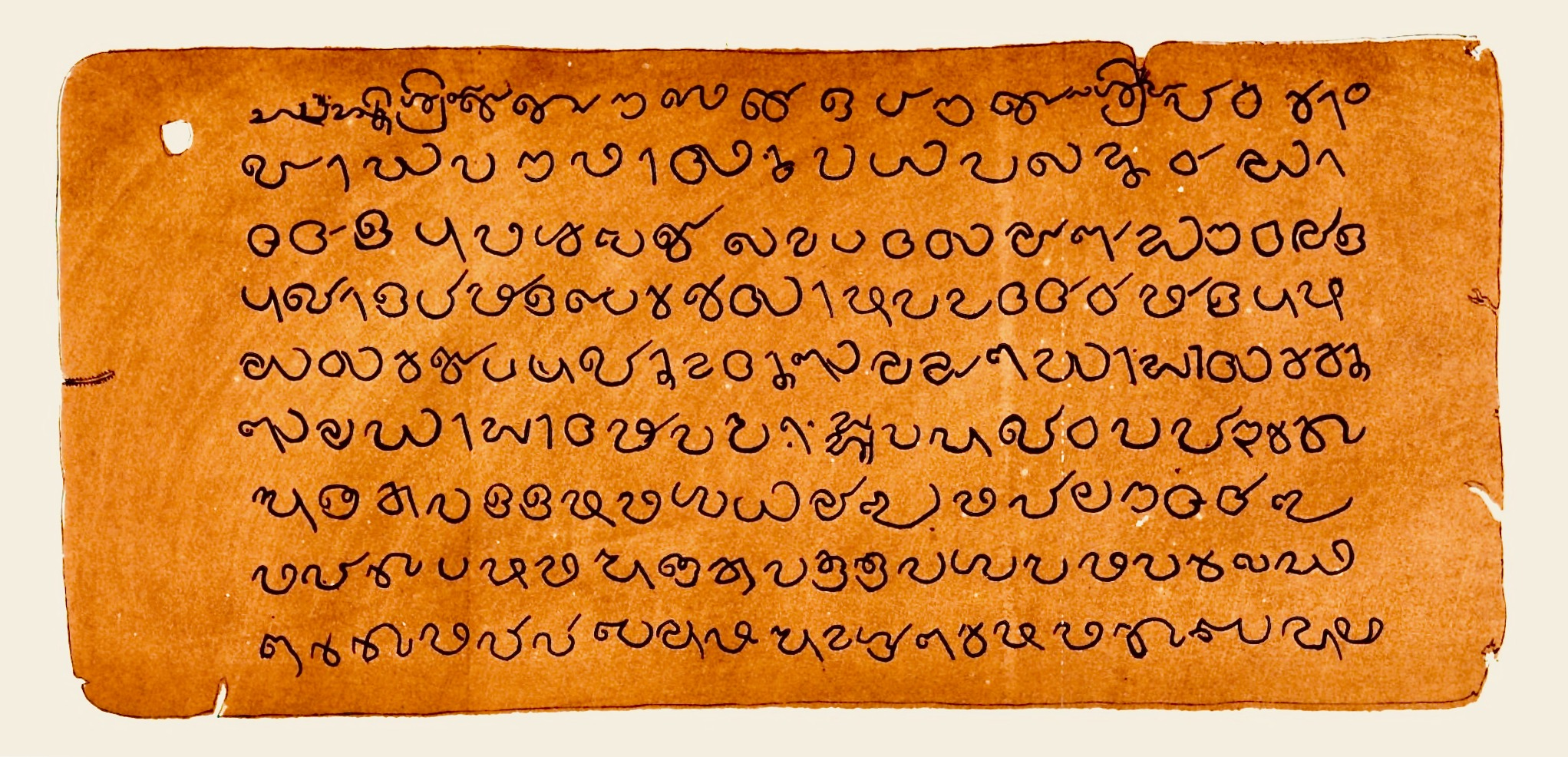
- Jewish copper plates of Cochin (c. 1000 AD)
- Occupation: Indian Ocean Merchant (aristocrat after c. 1000 AD)
- Years active: c. 1000 AD

Joseph Rabban (old Malayalam: Issuppu Irappan, also Yusuf/Oueseph Rabban; fl. 1000 AD) was a prominent Jewish merchant in the port of Kodungallur (Muyirikode; Mahodayapuram) on the Malabar Coast of southern India in early 11th century AD.

Around 1000 AD, Rabban was bestowed with aristocratic privileges by Bhaskara Ravi Manukuladitya, the Chera ruler of Kerala.

== Career ==
=== On the Malabar Coast ===
According to the Jewish copper plates of Cochin (c. 1000 AD), a charter issued by the Chera ruler of Kerala around 1000 AD, Rabban was granted several exclusive commercial rights and aristocratic privileges.

He was notably invested with the rights of the merchant guild anjuman/hanjamana on the Malabar Coast. Anjuman was a major merchant guild operating in south India at the time and was organized by Jewish, Christian, and Muslim merchants from Middle Eastern countries. He was also exempted from all payments that other settlers in the port city of Muyirikode (Kodungallur) were required to make to the Chera ruler, while simultaneously being granted all the rights enjoyed by the other settlers. These rights and privileges were granted in perpetuity to all his descendants.

=== Commercial Rights ===
- Rights of the Anjuman Guild
- The Anjuman Dues
- Remission of Duty and Weighing Fee
- Tolls by the Carts (by the boat and by other carts)
- Exemption from payments made by other settlers in Muyirikode to the Chera ruler of Kerala.
- All the rights of the other settlers in Muyirikode.

=== Aristocratic Privileges (the Seventy Two Privileges) ===
- Rights to employ the day lamp, decorative cloth, palanquin, umbrella, kettledrum, and trumpet.
- Rights to construct gateway, arch, and arched roof.
- Right to employ weapons.
- And the other "Seventy Two Privileges".

=== Legacy ===
Rabban's descendants continued to hold prominence among the Jews of the Malabar Coast for centuries. A conflict broke out in the 1340s between two of his descendants, Joseph Azar and his brother Aaron Azar.

== Sources ==
- Blady, Ken. Jewish Communities in Exotic Places. Northvale, NJ: Jason Aronson Inc., 2000. pp. 115–130.
