= Judeo-Malayalam =

Traditional Malayalam dialect of Cochin Jews

- യെഹൂദ്യമലയാളം (yehūdyamalayāḷaṃ)
- Native to: Kerala, Israel
- Ethnicity: Cochin Jews
- Native speakers: 8,000 (2009)
- Language family: Dravidian: Southern; Southern I; Tamil–Kannada; Tamil–Kota; Tamil–Toda; Tamil–Irula; Tamil–Kodava–Urali; Tamil–Malayalam; Malayalamoid; Malayalam; Judeo-Malayalam
- Writing system: Koleluttu script (Malayalam alphabet); Hebrew alphabet

Language codes
- ISO 639-3: –
- Glottolog: jewi1241 Jewish Malayalam
- Judeo-Malayalam speaking communities in Kerala (largely historical) and Israel (current)

Judeo-Malayalam (Malayalam: യെഹൂദ്യമലയാളം, yehūdyamalayāḷaṃ; Hebrew: מלאיאלאם יהודית, malayalam yəhūḏīṯ) is the traditional language of the Cochin Jews (also called Malabar Jews), from Kerala, in southern India, spoken today by a few dozen people in Israel and by fewer than 25 people in India. Judeo-Malayalam is the only known Dravidian Jewish language. (Note: Telugu is another Dravidian language spoken regularly by a Jewish community, the Telugu Jews. Because of the long period in which the Telugu Jews did not practice Judaism, they did not develop any distinctly identifiable Judeo-Telugu language or dialect.)

Since it does not differ substantially in grammar or syntax from other colloquial Malayalam dialects, it is not considered by many linguists to be a language in its own right, but rather a dialect, or simply a language variation. Judeo-Malayalam shares common features with other Jewish languages like Ladino, Judeo-Arabic and Yiddish. For example, verbatim translations from Hebrew to Malayalam, archaic features of Old Malayalam, Hebrew components agglutinated to Dravidian verb and noun formations and special idiomatic usages based on its Hebrew loanwords. Due to the lack of long-term scholarship on this language variation, there is no separate designation for the language (if it can be so considered), for it to have its own language code (see also SIL and ISO 639).

Unlike many Jewish languages, Judeo-Malayalam is not written using the Hebrew alphabet. It does, however, like most Jewish languages, contain many Hebrew loanwords, which are regularly transliterated, as much as possible, using the Malayalam script. Like many other Jewish languages, Judeo-Malayalam also contains a number of lexical, phonological and syntactic archaisms, in this case, from the days before Malayalam became fully distinguished from Tamil. In spite of claims by some Paradesi Jews that their ancestors' Ladino influenced the development of Judeo-Malayalam, so far no such influence, not even on the superficial lexical level, is found. There is, however, affiliation with Mappila Malayalam, especially of North Malabar, in words such as khabar or khabura (grave), and formations such as mayyattŭ āyi (മയ്യത്ത് ആയി) used by Muslims and śālōṃ āyi (ശാലോം ആയി) used by Jews for died (മരിച്ചു പോയി, mariccu pōyi in standard Malayalam). As with the parent language, Judeo-Malayalam also contains loanwords from Sanskrit and Pali as a result of the long-term affiliation of Malayalam, like all the other Dravidian languages, with Pali and Sanskrit through sacred and secular Buddhist and Hindu texts.

Because the vast majority of scholarship regarding the Cochin Jews has concentrated on the ethnographic accounts in English provided by Paradesi Jews (sometimes also called White Jews), who immigrated to Kerala from Europe in the sixteenth century and later, the study of the status and role of Judeo-Malayalam has suffered neglect. Since their emigration to Israel, Cochin Jewish immigrants have participated in documenting and studying the last speakers of Judeo-Malayalam, mostly in Israel. In 2009, a documentation project was launched under the auspices of the Ben-Zvi Institute in Jerusalem. Digital copies can be obtained for any scholar who wishes to study Judeo-Malayalam.

== Features ==
- Present tense marker is -aṇŭ like in central Kerala, unlike standard -unnu, eg. JM peyyaṇŭ, std. peyyunnu.
- Accusative case is -(n)a like in central/north Malayalam and Kodava, unlike standard -(y)e, e.g. std. āna-ye, JM, CM. āna-na; std. avaḷ-e, JM, CM. avaḷ-a. -(n)a is also used as a genitive case JM avaḷ-a, ummā-na, std. avaḷ-uṭe, umma-yuṭe.
- Past relative participle -a is -e, eg. nalla > nalle; vanna > vanne.
- Dative forms of terms ending with -n is usually -ŭ in standard form but JM uses the common -ikkŭ, eg. avanikkŭ like in west kochi, std. avanŭ; JM. jīvanikkŭ, std. jīvanŭ. -nŭ form can act as the nominative.
- Judeo-Malayalam used to made <ḻ> into t intervocalically, eg. katiccu < kaḻiccu and s before another t, eg. vāst- < vāḻt-, there are also cases of hypercorrection like kaḻa < katha, but they are only attested in writing and wasn't present during aliyah. This was also done by certain northern Thiyya speakers affirming the affinity of Judeo Malayalam and northern Malayalam.
- Malayalam-Hebrew compounds are found like mayyi-beṟāxa, ‘dusk-blessing’, first part Malayalam and second Hebrew.
- There are some semantic differences like retaining terms like śīṟiya even though the √cīṟu- has faded in normal malayalam, change in meanings like guṇam std. "benefit", JM. "luck"; dōṣam std. "disadvantage" JM. "character". Even Hebrew terms have meaning differences like sūṟa std. "form", JM "beauty".

== Vocabulary ==
Kinship terms in Judeo-Malayalam compared to other Malayalam varieties
English meaning	Judeo-Malayalam	Muslim Malayalam	Christian Malayalam	Hindu Malayalam
father	vāva	bāppa	appaṉ	acchaṉ
mother	umma	umma	ammma/ammacci	amma
elder brother	kākka/ikka	kākka/akka	ceṭṭaṉ	ceṭṭaṉ
husband	māppiḷa	kākka/akka	putiyāppiḷa/ikka	bharttāvə/ceṭṭaṉ

=== Loanwords ===
Over the centuries, Malayalam borrowed Hebrew words. A few of them are given below:

Original Hebrew	Malayalam derivative	Meaning	Notes
ner tamid (נר תמיד)	ner tamid	the "Eternal Light"	from the cognate (נר תמיד)
Nāṣrani	Nasrani	Follower of Nazarene tradition	Original term for the Nazarene sect at Qumran
Bimah (בּימה),	Bema	Altar	from the cognate Bima
Tamar (Hebrew: תָּמָר)	Tamara	Upright beauty	from the cognate Tmr (Hebrew: תָּמָר) "Date Palm" ( of Upright Beauty), as described in Song of Songs chapter 7. Implies Stature (Posture) and upright beauty. implying upright and resilient plant in adverse environment. Like (upright Date Palm in the hostile desert) and (upright Lotus in murky water (malayalam)). Similar characteristics of resilience across diverse environments.

== See also ==
- Suriyani Malayalam
- Arabi Malayalam
- Religiolect

== Bibliography ==
- Gamliel, Ophira. Fading memories and Linguistic Fossils in the religiolect of Kerala Jews. University of Glasgow.
- "Judeo-Malayalam page" Archived 1 May 2009 at the Wayback Machine, Jewish Language Research
- "Malayalam" page, Ethnologue
- Hebrew (omniglot.com)
- "Jews of India", The South Asian
