= Kochangadi Synagogue =

Former synagogue in Kochi, Kerala, India

- Hebrew: בית הכנסת קוצ'נגאדי; Malayalam: കൊച്ചങ്ങാടി ജൂതപള്ളി
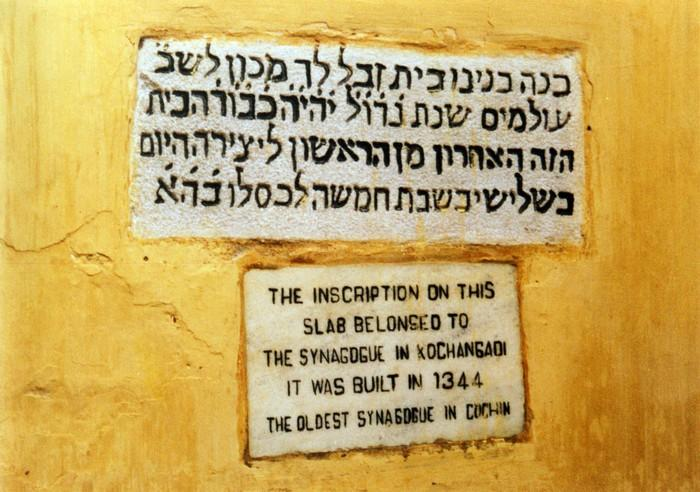
- Hebrew inscription on a tablet from the former Kochangadi Synagogue, now placed at the eastern wall of the Paradesi Synagogue

Religion
- Affiliation: Judaism
- Rite: Nusach Sefard
- Ecclesiastical or organizational status: Synagogue (1344–1789)
- Status: Destroyed

Location
- Location: Kochangadi, Kerala
- Country: India

Architecture
- Type: Synagogue architecture
- Style: Cochin Jewish architectur
- Completed: 1344
- Destroyed: 1789 (2nd Anglo-Mysore War)

The Kochangadi Synagogue (Hebrew: בית הכנסת קוצ'נגאדי; Malayalam: കൊച്ചങ്ങാടി ജൂതപള്ളി), or Misro Synagogue, was an historic Jewish congregation and synagogue, located in Kochangadi, south of Jew Town in Kochi, in the coastal state of Kerala, India.

It was built in 1344 by the Malabari Jews after fleeing from Cranganore, making it the oldest synagogue in India in recorded history. It was lost and never rebuilt. "Kochangadi" is an abbreviation of "Kocha Angadi" or "Jew Market", as Jews were addressed as Kocha in colloquial Malayalam.

The synagogue in its history underwent multiple stages of destruction and restoration. The ruins of the synagogue were believed to have been intact until the late 20th century. The compound had at least one intact wall and was colloquially called "Misro Palli" though the entomology of the name is lost to time. The foundation stone is retained in the courtyard wall of the Paradesi Synagogue of Mattancherry, by the Paradesi Jews.

== History ==
The Kochangadi Synagogue was built in the 14th century, after the Malabari Jews had to abandon Muziris or Kodungallur. Joseph Azar, the 72nd heir to Joseph Rabban and the last Jewish prince of Shingly, fled to Kochangadi with his followers and founded the Kochangadi congregation. The reason for this migration is unclear with numerous theories and legends ranging from an attack by the Portuguese, a catastrophic flood in 1341, to a quarrel and subsequent murder of his elder brother Aaron Azar. Moses Pereira de Paiva gives his account Noticias dos Judeos de Cochim, that he had seen the tomb of Joseph Azar in Cochin. No extant remains have been found to corroborate this claim.

Another tradition states that the Palayur Jews migrated to Kochangadi and founded the congregation, based on oral songs of Cochini women. Other traditions state that the nearby Chembittapally, a Muslim mosque, was built with wood donated by the Kochangadi Jews.

After its establishment in 1344, the synagogue was restored by Baruch Joseph Levi in 1539. Levy was the Jewish Mudaliyar of the Cochin Jews. It is believed to have been demolished by the army of Tipu Sultan during his raids into Kerala in 1789, during the Second Anglo-Mysore War. Added to that, Muslim dominance in the area may have forced the Kochangadi Jews to relocate further north to Jew Town in Mattancherry.

After it was destroyed, the Jewish community did not rebuild the synagogue. Instead, they moved to the nearby Kochi and carried with them the inscription stone mentioning its year of construction and planted it a wall of the Kadavumbhagam Mattancherry Synagogue at Synagogue Lane, Jew Town. It was re-discovered in 1818 when plaster fell from the wall, exposing the inscription tablet. Later on, the tablet was inserted into the east wall of the nearby Paradesi Synagogue where it remains. The Hebrew inscription states that the structure was built in 5105 (as per the Hebrew calendar) as "an abode for the spirit of God". The tablet is the oldest known Jewish relic from any synagogue in India.

== See also ==
- History of the Jews in India
- List of synagogues in India
- List of synagogues in Kerala
