= Abraham Barak Salem =

Indian politician (1882–1967)

Dr. Abraham Barak Salem
- Born: Jewish Gandhi, Salem Kocha; 1882; Jew Town, Kingdom of Cochin, British India
- Died: 1967 (aged 85 years); Mattancherry, Kochi, Kerala, India
- Burial place: Paradesi Cemetery, Jew Town, Kochi
- Citizenship: India
- Education: Maharaja's College, Ernakulam; Presidency College Madras, Chennai
- Occupations: Lawyer; Politician
- Known for: Advocate, Municipal Chairman, Mattancherry, Member of Legislative council, Cochin. Executive Committee member of The Peoples of the Indian States Conference Delegate to the Indian National Congress session at Lahore (1929) First Labour Leader in Cochin. Founder of Indo-Palestine Co. Visited Palestine & Israel as the representative of the Cochin Jewish Community to fight for Aliya. Vice-president of Malabar Jews association (1932-47). Secretary of Cochin Zionist Association.
- Notable work: The Eternal Light (1929)
- Spouse: Ruth Salem
- Children: Malkah Salem Mino Salem Balpher Salem Raymond Salem Gamliel Salem
- Parents: Barrak Salem (father); Belukka Salem (mother)
- Relatives: Avraham Salem (Grandfather) Itzhak Salem (Cousin) Japeth Salem
- Family: Salem

Abraham ben Barak Salem (1882 – 1967) was an Indian nationalist and Zionist, a lawyer and politician, and one of the most prominent Cochin Jews of the twentieth century. Popularly known by his epithet of "Jewish Gandhi", he was known as "Salem Kocha" to the resident Jewish community of Cochin. A descendant of Meshuchrarim, he was the first Cochin Jew to become an attorney. He practised in Ernakulam, where he eventually used Satyagraha to fight the discrimination among Paradesi Jews against Malabari Jews. An activist in the trade union and Indian national causes, he later was attracted to Zionism. After visiting Palestine in the 1930s, he later helped arrange the migration of most Cochin Jews to Israel by 1955. He stayed in Kochi for the remainder of his life. One of his grandchildren with the name Regan Abraham who is renowned boxer lives in New York and also served in Israeli Army.

== Early life ==
Salem was born in 1882 to a Jewish family in Cochin (Kingdom of Cochin), then a princely state in British India and now part of the Indian state of Kerala. His family were regarded as Meshuchrarim, a Hebrew word used, sometimes neutrally and sometimes with derogatory intent, to denote a manumitted slave or her descendants. The Paradesi Jews of Cochin had arrived there in the 16th century, following the expulsion of Jews from Spain. They discriminated against the meshuchrarim in their community who were relegated to a subordinate position in the Paradesi Synagogue in Cochin. Given the cultural differences between them, the Paradesi Jews and the older communities of Malabari Jews also maintained ethnic distinctions for centuries, which became associated historically with differences in skin colour.

Brought up by his mother, Salem attended the Maharaja's College in Ernakulam. He moved to Chennai to earn his Bachelor of Arts degree, becoming the first university graduate among the meshuchrarim. Whilst in Chennai he also earned his law degree, the first Jew from Cochin to do so, before returning to practice as a lawyer in the Cochin Chief Court in Ernakulam.

== Activism ==
The Malabari Jews had seven places of worship; the Sephardic Jews had one, the Paradesi Synagogue, which for centuries had been barred to those whom they considered impure. The contemporary historian Edna Fernandes calls it "a bastion of white purity". The Sephardic Jews practiced endogamous marriage, which excluded both the meshuchrarim and Malabari Jews (who also practiced endogamy that excluded the other groups). The meshuchrarim had to sit in the back of the synagogue or outside. The separation resembled Indian discrimination against lower castes, which was sometimes repeated in Christian churches in India.

Salem fought against this discrimination by boycotting the synagogue for a time. He used satyagraha (or non-violent protest) as a means of combating discrimination within the community. This led some people to later refer to him as the "Jewish Gandhi". By the mid-1930s, Mandelbaum reported that many of the old taboos had fallen, reflecting wider changes in Indian society as well.

Salem served in the Legislative Council in the princely state of Cochin from 1925 to 1931 and again from 1939 to 1945. A supporter of the nascent trade union movement in Kerala and an active Indian nationalist, at the end of 1929 he attended the Lahore session of the Indian National Congress. It passed a resolution calling for complete independence from the Raj.

After visiting Palestine in 1933, Salem was attracted to the Zionist cause. After Indian independence, he worked to promote Aliyah to Israel among the Cochin Jews. In 1953, he visited Israel to negotiate on behalf of Indian Jews who wanted to migrate. This also helped to diminish the divisions among the Cochin Jews. After emigration they were all considered foreigners to Israel, and many struggled to assimilate.

Although most of Cochin's ancient Jewish community eventually left for Israel by 1955 (and, in the case of many Sephardic Jews, for North America and England), Salem lived in Cochin until his death in 1967. He was buried in the White Jewish cemetery in Jew Town in Cochin.

== Personal life ==
Salem was married to Ruth Salem in Calcutta. His five children, now deceased, were: sons Raymond, a lawyer, and Balfour and Gamliel, both engineers, with Gamliel earning a Master’s Degree at Cornell University in New York; and daughters Malka and Venetia, both gynecologists. Although they got documents to migrate to Israel, Salem and his family chose to stay back in Kerala.

In 1929, Salem wrote The Eternal Light, a book in English about the architecture and customs of the Paradesi Synagogue. In the book, he referred obliquely to the discrimination faced by Brown Jews, using Biblical verses. Salem was a prolific diarist and 21 volumes of his diaries, from the 1920s to the mid-1950s, are in the Magnes Collection of Jewish Art and Life at the University of California, Berkeley.

Speaking of his ties to Cochin, Salem wrote:

“The Jews of Cochin are the most loyal citizens and…offer special prayers to bless, preserve, guard, assist and exalt the Raja of Cochin and His Royal Family…in spite of the tenacious, age-long fond longing to return to Jerusalem.”

Just opposite to the Paradesi synagogue, the third house was later owned by Salem. There near the outer wall existed “Salem’s looking glass,” his own concept where he would put English newspaper cuttings on various topics so that interested people could have a talk or discussion with him. Salem, who died in 1967, is buried in the Paradesi Synagogue cemetery.

== Honours ==
- The road adjacent to the White Jewish Cemetery in Kochi was named after Salem.
- The largest open ground in Cochin was once known as Salem Maidan, in recognition of Salem’s powerful public speaking skills in Malayalam
- As a tribute to him there is a small resting hub for laborers in the next street owned by Center of Indian Trade Union.
- His former home is a popular tourist destination for travelers visiting the Jew Town in Mattancherry.
