= Chempittapally =

Mosque in Mattancherry, Kochi, Kerala, India

- Location of the mosque in Kerala

Religion
- Affiliation: Sunni Islam
- Sect: Sufism
- Ecclesiastical or organizational status: Mosque
- Status: Active

Location
- Location: Mattancherry, Kochangadi, Kochi, Ernakulam district, Kerala
- Country: India
- Interactive map of Chempittapally
- Coordinates: 9°56′56″N 76°15′34″E

Architecture
- Type: Mosque architecture
- Style: Kerala-Islamic
- Founder: Syed Moulana Bukhari Thangal
- Funded by: King of Kochi
- Completed: c. 1520 to c. 1540 CE

Chempittapally (Bengali: চেম্পিত্তাপল্লী মসজিদ, romanized: Chempitta Palli, lit. 'Bronze Mosque'; Arabic: مسجد شمبتابالي), also known as Chembitta Palli and as Chembittapally Juma Masjid, is a Sifi Friday mosque in the Mattancherry neighbourhood, in Kochangadi, Kochi, in the Ernakulam district of the state of Kerala, India. Built between 1520 and 1540, the roof of the mosque was decorated with copper tiles, hence chempitta pally. The mosque was built in the Kerala-Islamic style, and is located within a heritage area, near the MANI-listed Mattancherry Palace.

== Overview ==
The compound has three gates: one in the west which opens toward Panayapilly, the second in the south which opens toward Goldenmukku and Kochangadi, and the main gate in the eastern side of compound, which opens toward Angadi, which in turn leads the way to Jew Street and Mattancherry Bazaar towards the north and to Chullickal towards the south. The graveyard near the gate towards the south houses a few old and important gravestones.

The support beams of the mosque are made of timber. Legend has it that a Jewish merchant who overheard the Sufi saint Syed Mau Lana Bukhari Thangal reciting the Old Testament to his followers, decided to donate the timber for the construction of this mosque. There are Tamil and Arabic inscriptions right above the three doors which lead to the central prayer hall.

The mosque is intrinsically linked with the history of the Naina family.

== See also ==
- Islam in India
- List of mosques in India
- List of mosques in Kerala
