= Paradesi Synagogue =

Synagogue in Kochi, Kerala, India

Paradesi Synagogue בית הכנסת פרדסי
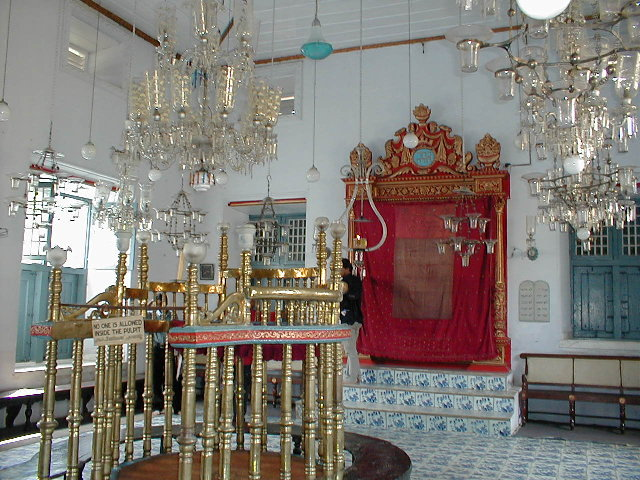
- Interior of the synagogue facing the ark

Religion
- Affiliation: Judaism
- Status: Active

Location
- Location: Kochi, Kerala
- Interactive map of Paradesi Synagogue בית הכנסת פרדסי
- Coordinates: 9°57′26″N 76°15′34″E

Architecture
- Type: Synagogue
- Completed: 1568

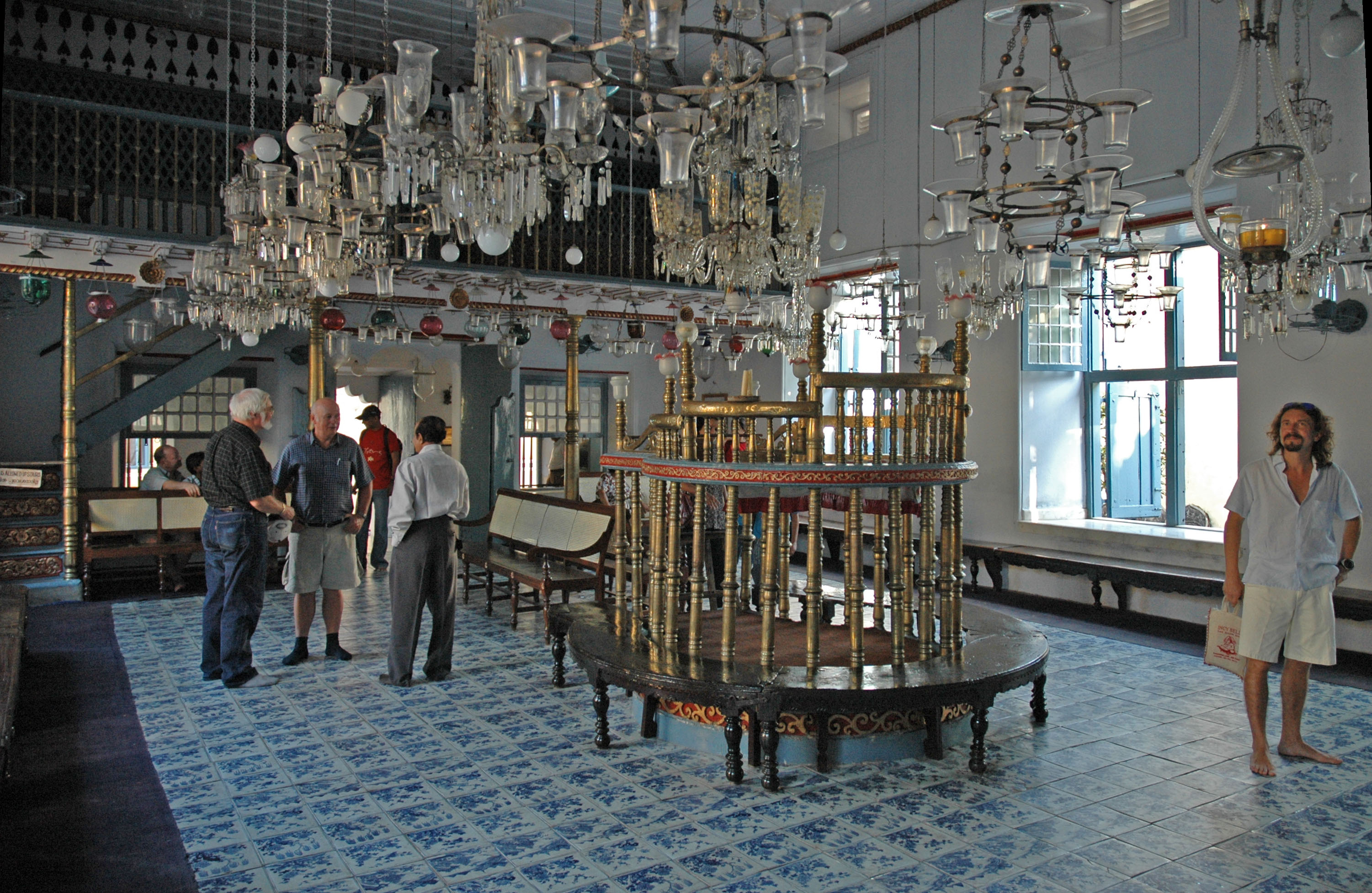
Interior of the synagogue facing the entrance

The Paradesi Synagogue or the Mattancherry Synagogue is a synagogue located in Mattancherry Jew Town, a suburb of the city of Kochi, Kerala, in India. It was built in 1568 A.D. by Samuel Castiel, David Belila, and Joseph Levi for the flourishing Paradesi Jewish community in Kochi. Cochin Jews were composed mainly of the much older Malabari Jews and the newly arrived Sephardic refugees from the Portuguese religious persecution of Jews in Spain and Portugal. It is the oldest active synagogue in the Commonwealth of Nations. Paradesi is a word meaning foreign.

The synagogue is located in the quarter of Old Cochin known as Jew Town, and is the only one of the seven synagogues in the area still in use. The complex has four buildings. It was built adjacent to the Mattancherry Palace temple on the land given to the community by the Raja of Kochi, Rama Varma. The Mattancherry Palace temple and the synagogue share a common wall.

== History ==
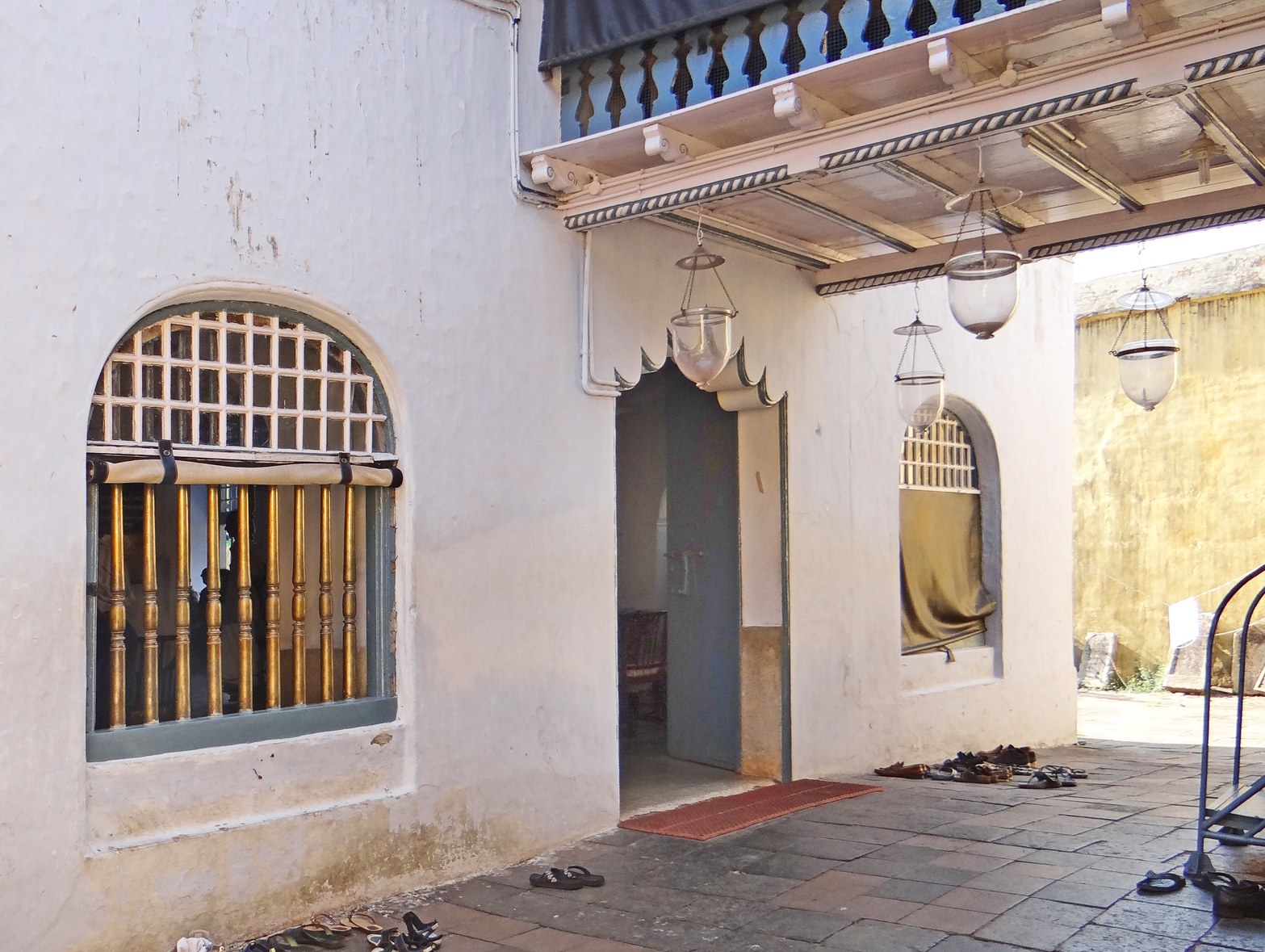
Entrance

The Malabari Jews or Yehudan Mappila (also known as Cochin Jews) formed a prosperous trading community of Kerala, and they controlled a major portion of worldwide spice trade. In 1568, Paradesi Jews constructed the Paradesi Synagogue adjacent to Mattancherry Palace, Cochin, now part of the Indian city of Ernakulam, on land given to them by the Raja of Kochi. The first synagogue in India was built in the 4th century in Kodungallur (Cranganore) when the Jews had a mercantile role in the South Indian region (now called Kerala) along the Malabar coast. When the community moved to Kochi in the 14th century, it built a new synagogue there.

The Malabari Jews' or the Yehudan Mappila first synagogue in Cochin was destroyed in the 16th century during the Portuguese persecution of the Jews and Nasrani or Suriyani Mappila or Syriac (Aramaic) Mappila people. The second, built under the protection of the Raja, in Mattancherry, in 1558, during the Portuguese rule of Cochin, is the present synagogue, which is still in use for worship and can attract a minyan. It is called Paradesi synagogue because it was built by Spanish speaking Jews (Paradesi Jews); this contributed to the informal name: paradesi synagogue or "foreign" synagogue. In addition, a new Jewish group had immigrated to Kochi, Sephardim from the Iberian Peninsula. They and the Malabari Jews or Yehudan Mappila shared many aspects of their religion, and the newcomers learned the Judeo-Malayalam dialect, but the Sephardim also retained their own culture and Spanish language at least for three centuries. By 1660 the Dutch ruled the Kochi area, calling it Dutch Malabar. In later years, the Paradesi Synagogue was used primarily by the Sephardim (who were also referred to as Paradesi) and their descendants, and later European exiled Jews.

The Paradesi Synagogue had three classes of members:

- White Jews were full members. The White Jews, or Paradesi Jews, were the recent descendants of Sephardim from Spain, Portugal and the Netherlands.
- Black Jews, or Malabari Jews, were allowed to worship but were not admitted to full membership. These Cochin Jews were the original Jewish settlers of Cochin.
- Meshuchrarim, a group of freed slaves and their descendants brought by the Sephardim, they had no communal rights and no synagogue of their own. They sat on the floor or on the steps outside. In the first half of the 20th century, Abraham Barak Salem, a meshuchrar, successfully campaigned against this discrimination.

In 1968, the 400th anniversary of the synagogue was celebrated in a ceremony attended by Indira Gandhi, the Indian Prime Minister.

== Present ==
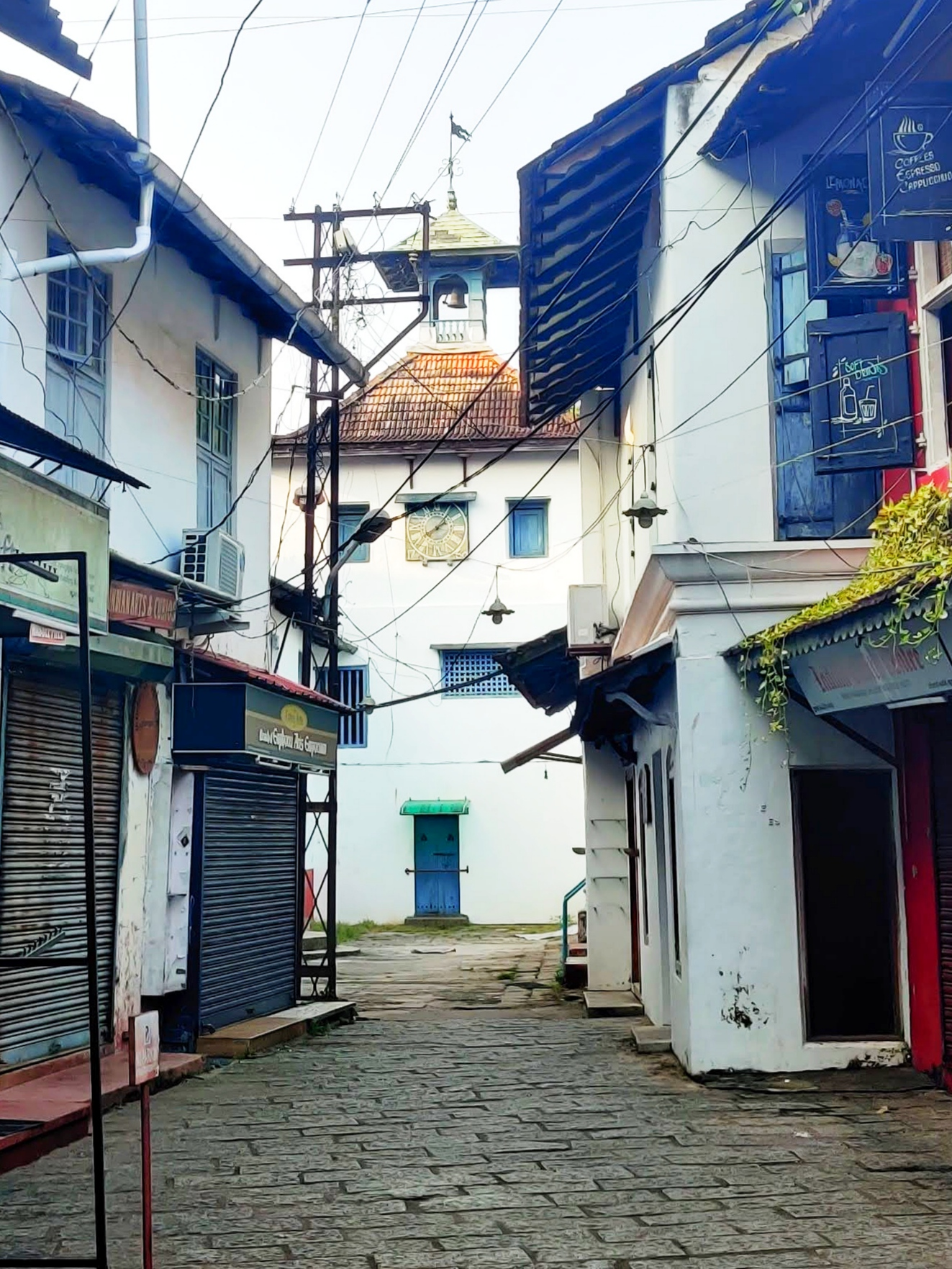
The Paradesi Synagogue with its clock, during the COVID-19 pandemic

As is customary for synagogues, the Paradesi Synagogue has separate seating sections for men and women.

Today the Paradesi Synagogue is the only functioning synagogue in Kochi with a minyan (though this minyan must be formed with Jews from outside Kochi, as the number who still reside there is not sufficient). In conformity with the Hindu, St Thomas Christian or Syrian Mappila and Muslim Mappila traditions of Kerala, the worshippers are required to enter the Paradesi Synagogue barefoot. Other facets which are unique to the Cochin Jewish community, and which are results of Hindu influence, include special colours of clothing for each festival, circumcision ceremonies performed at public worship, and distribution of grape-soaked myrtle leaves on certain festivals. In addition, the current Rabbi at the Paradesi synagogue placed by Midrash Sephardi is Rabbi Yonaton Francis Goldschmidt.

The synagogue is open for a fee to visitors as a historic attraction. The ticket-seller, Yaheh Hallegua, is the last female Paradesi Jew of child-bearing age. The synagogue is closed on Fridays, Saturdays and Sundays and also on Jewish holidays. As of April 2016, only 5 Jews lived in Fort Kochi.. Timing to visit the Mattanherry Synagogue is from 10:00 a.m to 1:00 p.m and then it again opens from 5:00 p.m to 7:00 p.m. There is a strict dress code for both men and women. Men have to wear full shirts and trousers and women have to wear skirts below knee length . One of the most senior most Jews in Kerala Dr. John Jacob who lived in Kaviyoor village, Thiruvalla died at the age of 80 years on 25 May 2025 and his body is buried in his family church at kaviyoor, Thiruvalla.

== Objects of antiquity ==
The Paradesi Synagogue has the Scrolls of the Law, several gold crowns received as gifts, many Belgian glass chandeliers, and a brass-railed pulpit. It houses the 10th-century copper plates of privileges given to Joseph Rabban, the earliest known Cochin Jew. These two plates were inscribed in Old Malayalam by the ruler of the Malabar Coast. The floor of the synagogue is composed of hundreds of Chinese, 18th-century, hand-painted porcelain tiles, each of which is unique. A hand-knotted oriental rug was a gift from Haile Selassie, the last Ethiopian emperor. The synagogue has an 18th-century clock tower, which, along with other parts of the complex, was restored between 1998 and 1999 by the architect Karl Damschen under the direction of the World Monuments Fund.

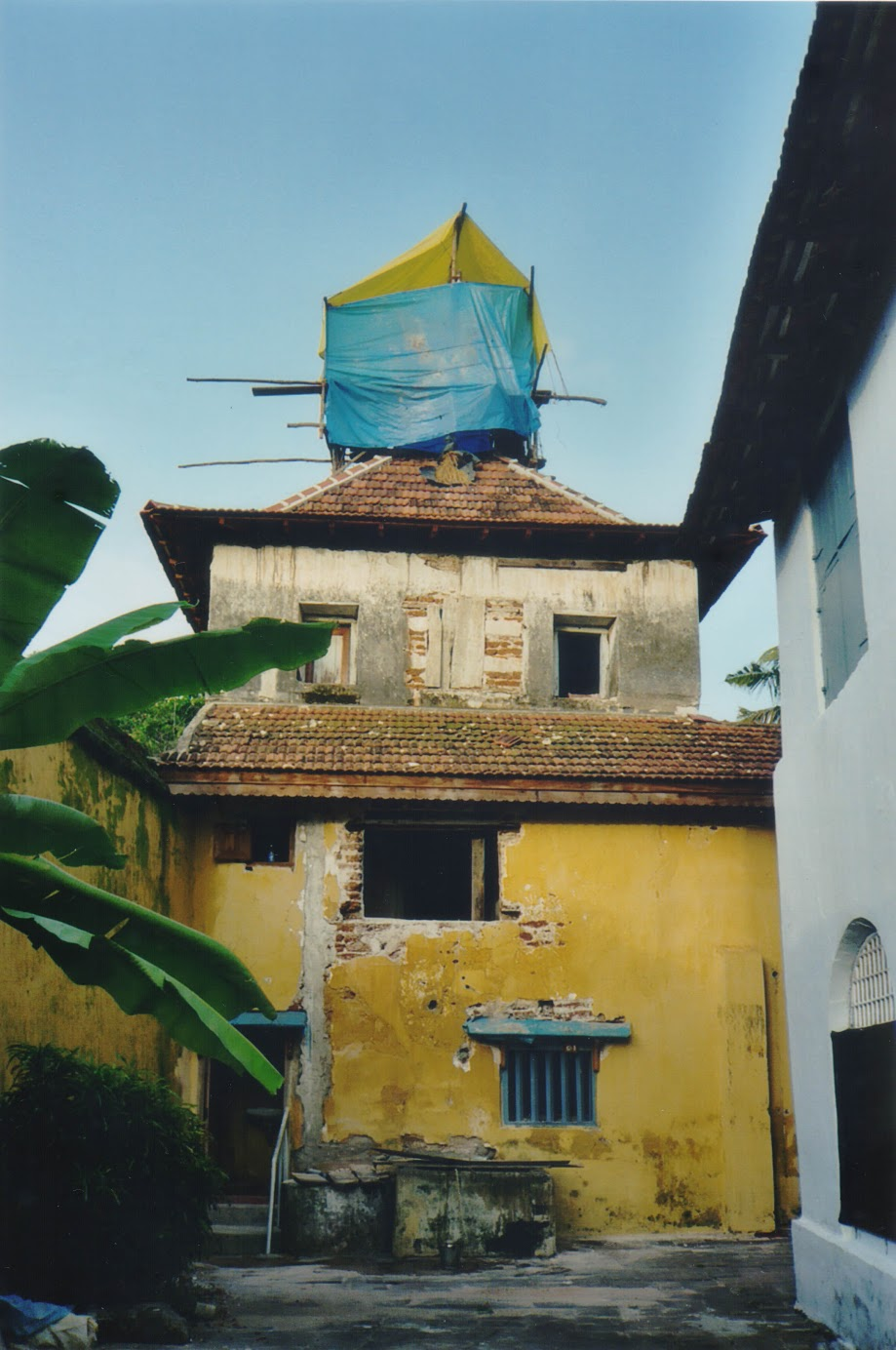
Clock tower of the Paradesi synagogue (2001)

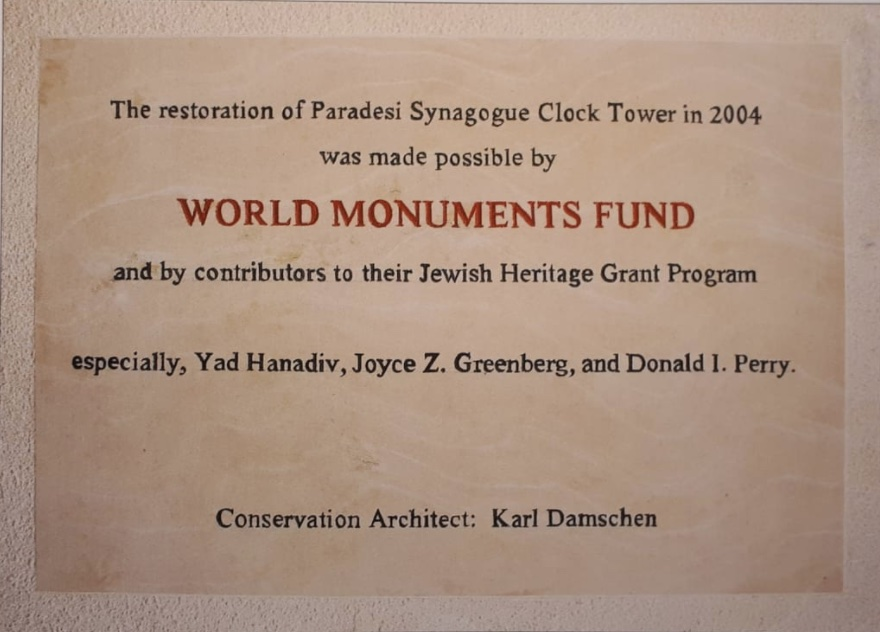
Plaquette in the Paradesi synagogue

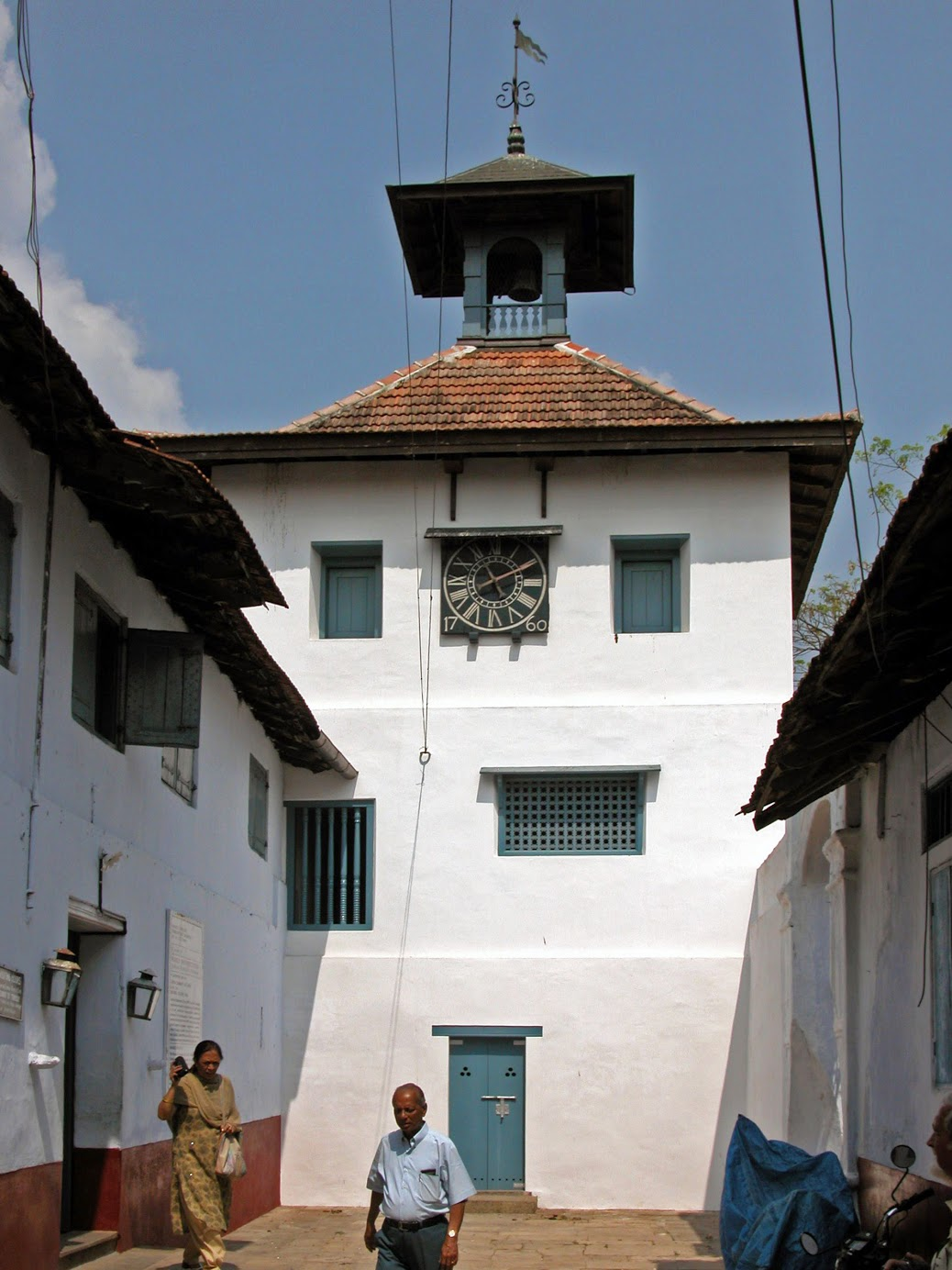
Clock tower of the Paradesi Synagogue (2005)

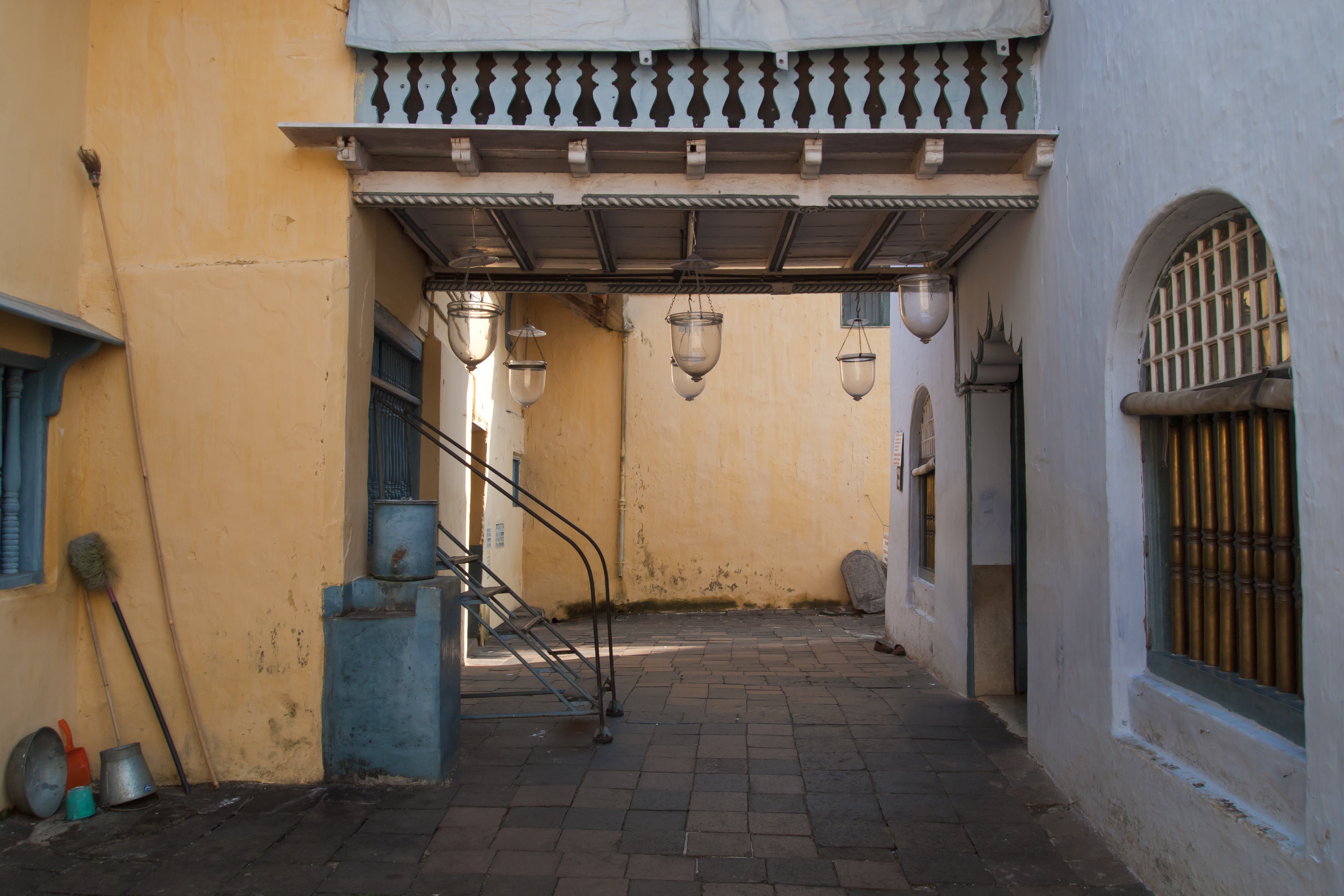
Entrance

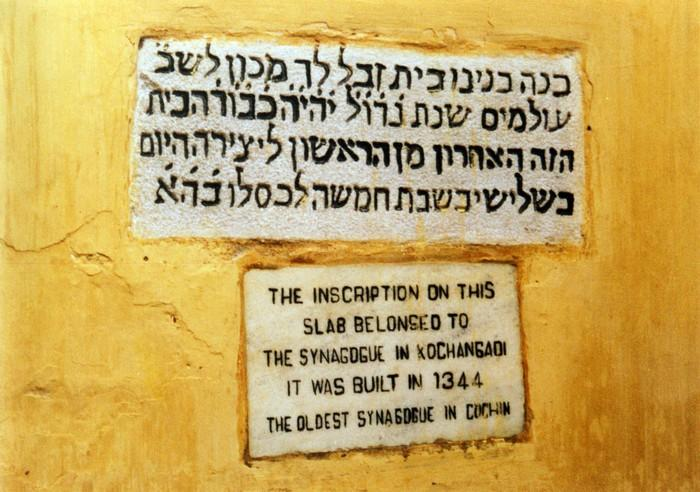
Hebrew inscription tablet of the Kochangadi Synagogue in the courtyard wall of Paradesi Synagogue.

A tablet from the former Kochangadi Synagogue (1344) in Kochangadi, south of Jew Town in Kochi was installed on the outer wall of the Paradesi synagogue. The inscription states that the structure was built in 5105 (in the Hebrew calendar) as "an abode for the spirit of God".. This tablet was initially discovered inserted in the wall of the Kadavumbhaagam Mattanchery Synagogue during restoration work.

== Thekkumbhagom synagogue ==
The Thekkumbhagom synagogue, located on Jews Street in the Ernakulam area of Cochin, was built in 1580 and renovated in 1939.

== See also ==
- History of the Jews in India
- List of synagogues in India
- List of synagogues in Kerala
- Oldest synagogues in the world
- Luso-Indian
