= Meshuchrarim =

Mixed race Sephardic Jews who migrated to India along with the Paradesi Jews

Meshuchrarim, also known historically as the "Black Jews", are a Jewish community of freed slaves, often of mixed-race African-European descent, who accompanied Sephardic Jews in their immigration to India following their 16th-century expulsion from Spain. The Sephardic Jews became known as the Paradesi Jews as "foreigners" to India. They were also sometimes called the White Jews, for their European ancestry.

The descendants of the meshuchrarim were historically discriminated against in India by other "White Jews." They were at the lowest of the Cochin Jewish informal caste ladder. The Paradesi came to use the Paradesi Synagogue; while they allowed the meshuchrarim as Jews to worship there, they had to sit in the back, could not become full members, and were excluded from the community's endogamous marriage circle. At the same time, they were excluded by the Malabar Jews, the much larger community of Jews who had lived in Cochin for perhaps 1,000 years.

In the early 20th century, Abraham Barak Salem became one of the most prominent Cochin Jews. A descendant of meshuchrarim, he was the first to earn a college degree and the first Cochin Jew of any sort to become a lawyer. He fought against the discrimination against his people. By the 1930s, social discrimination against the meshuchrarim began to diminish. Most Cochin Jews, including the meshuchrarim, emigrated to Israel by the mid-1950s.

== See also ==
- Paradesi Jews
- Cochin Jews
