= Keshava Rama Varma =

Raja of Cochin from 1565 to 1601

Kesava Rama Varma was the raja of the kingdom of Cochin which was situated in modern-day India, and was at the time a Portuguese Protectorate. He is notable for donating the land to the Yehuden Mappilla community to construct the Paradesi Synagogue in 1568.
