= Kochangadi =

- town
- Location in Kerala, India
- Coordinates: 9°56′52.1″N 76°15′34.3″E
- Country: India
- State: Kerala
- District: Ernakulam

Languages
  - Official: Malayalam, English
- Time zone: UTC+5:30 (IST)
- Vehicle registration: KL-43

Kochangadi is a small area in west Kochi in Ernakulam district of Kerala state south India. It is reputed for Chempittapally which is an old Mosque of historical importance. Historically, Kochangadi housed a sizeable Jewish community that constructed the oldest documented synagogue in Kerala in 1344.
