= Mattancherry =

Place in Kochi, Kerala, India

Mattancherry Cochim de Cima
- Ward
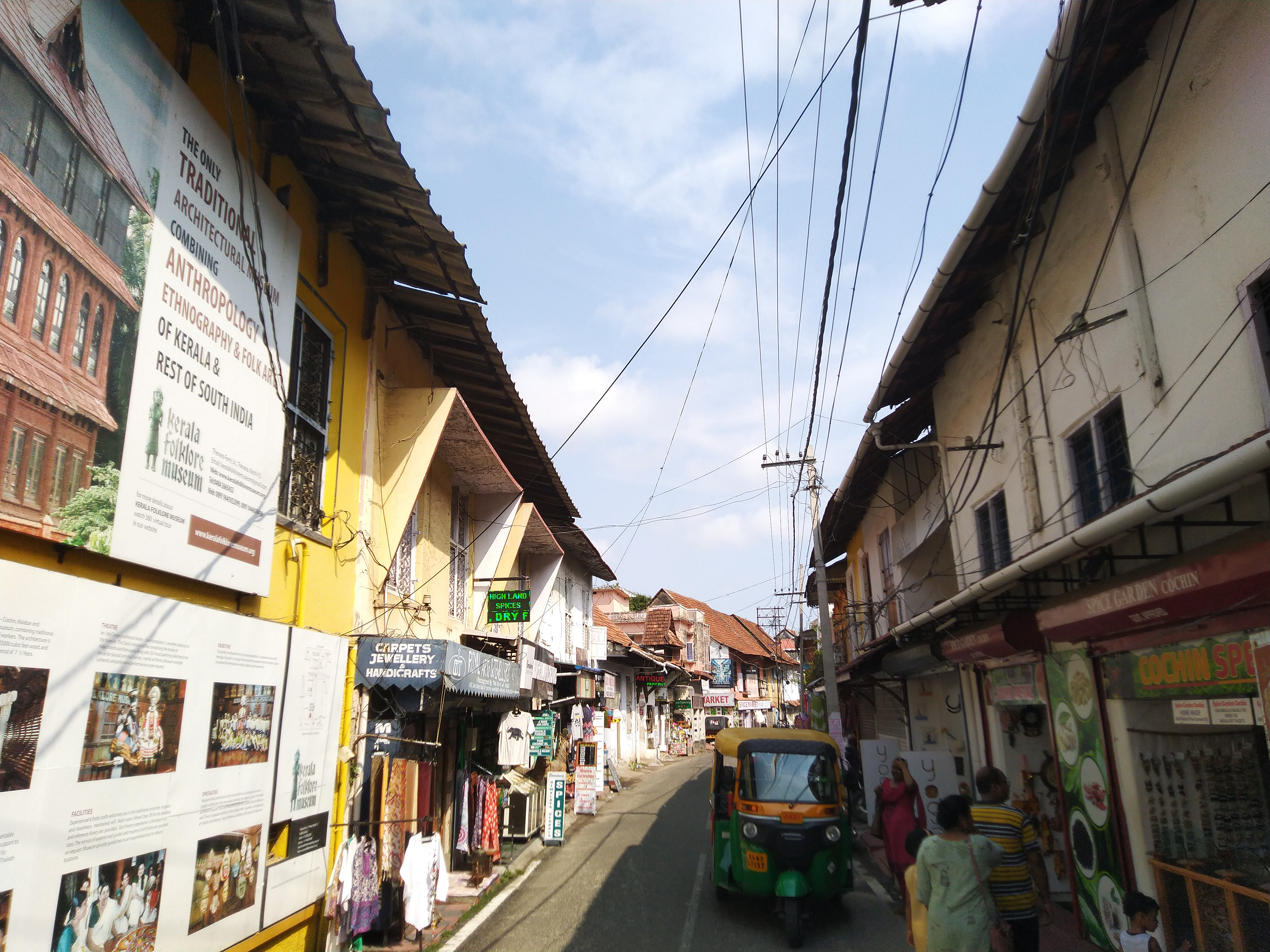
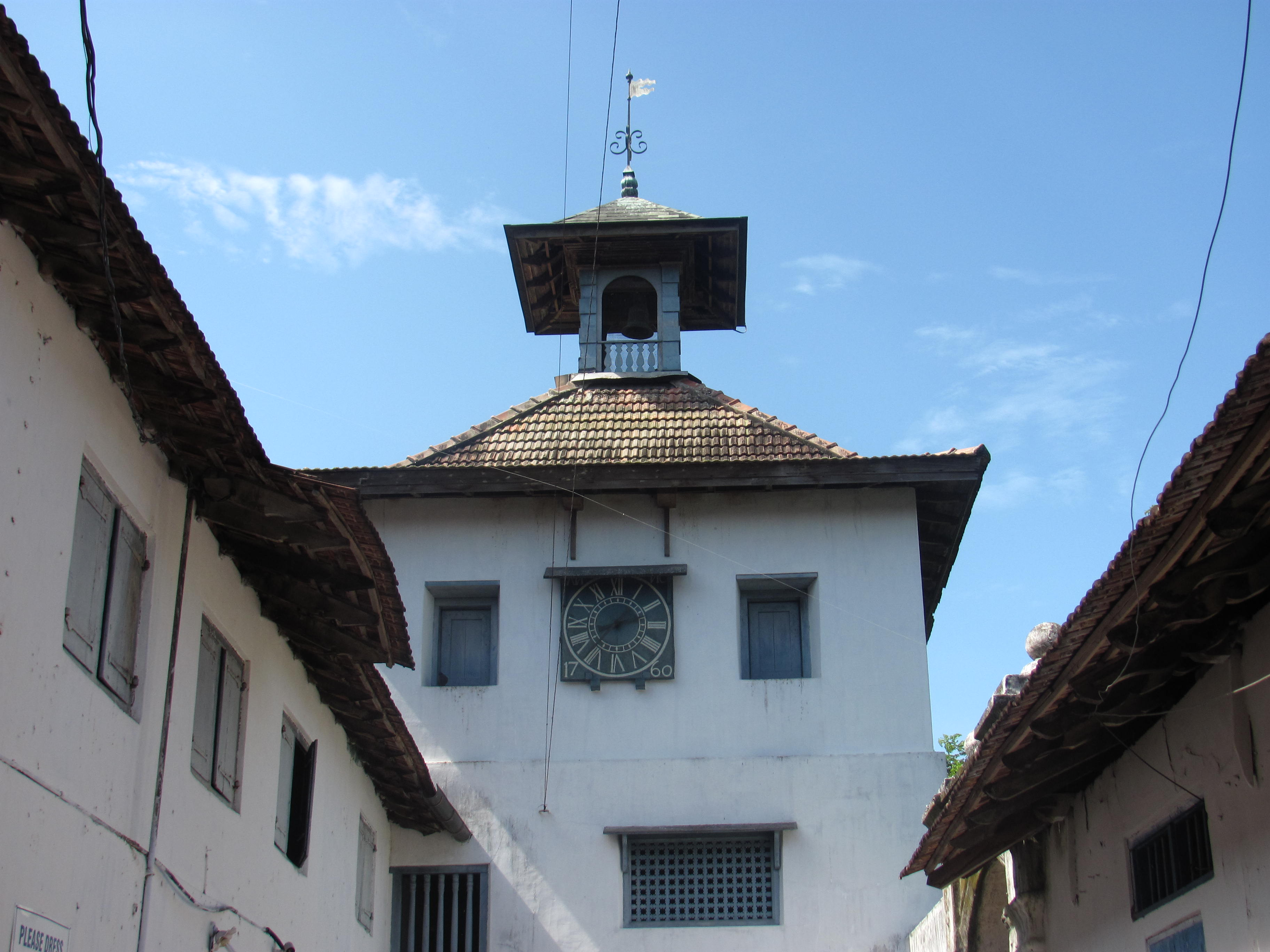
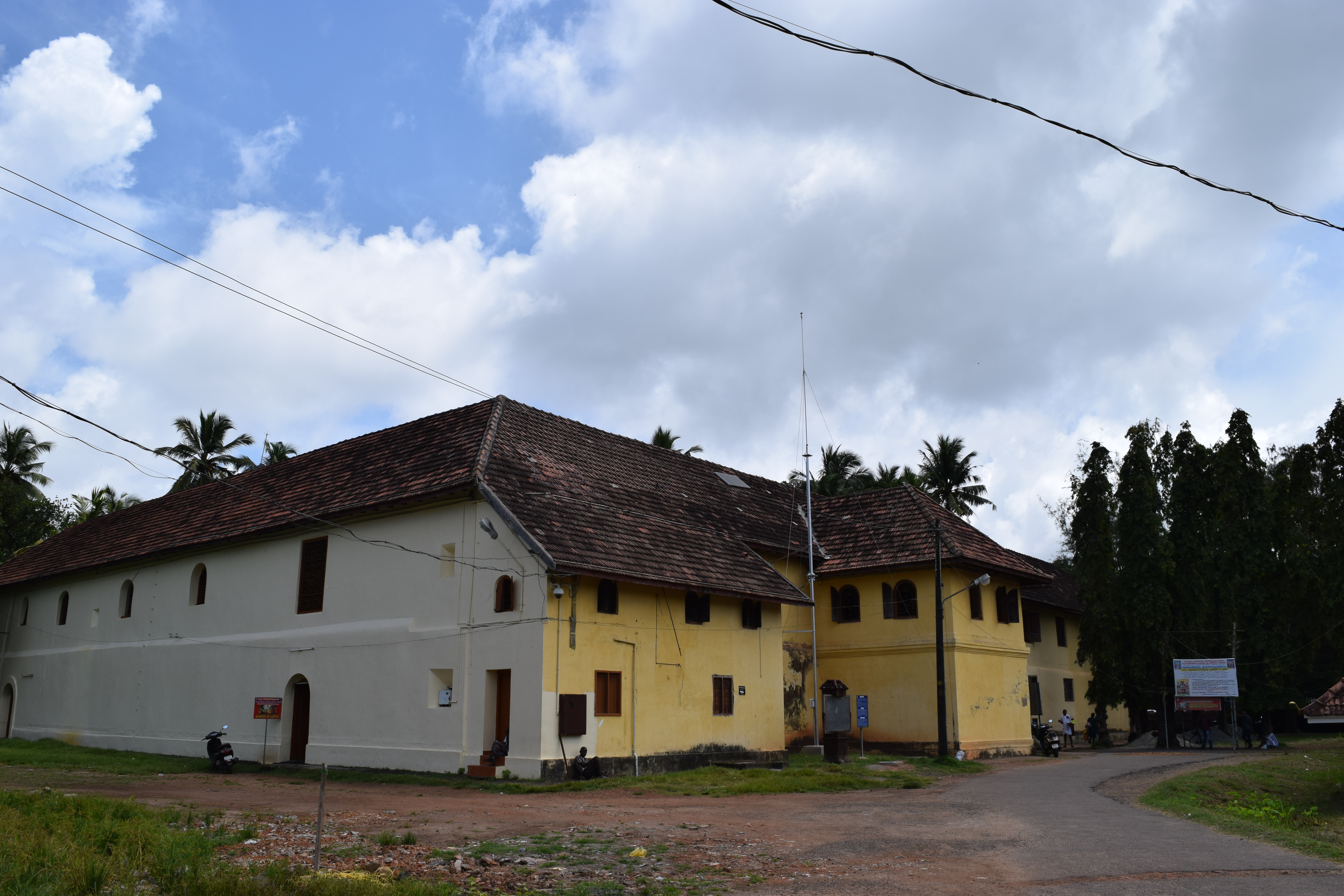
- 1. Jew Street, Mattancherry 2. Paradesi Synagogue 3.Dutch Palace

- Location in Kerala, India
- Coordinates: 9°57′45″N 76°15′15″E
- Country: India
- State: Kerala
- District: Ernakulam

Population
  - Total: 10,144

Languages
  - Official: Malayalam, English
- Time zone: UTC+5:30 (IST)
- PIN: 682002
- Vehicle registration: KL-43

Mattancherry (Malayalam: [mɐʈːaːɲd͡ʒeːɾi]; Cochin Portuguese Creole: Cochim de Cima [ˈkoʃĩ ðɨ ˈsĩmɐ]) is a historic ward of Kochi, Kerala. It is about 9 km south-west from the city centre. Mattanchery is home to many sites of historical and cultural significance, including the Paradesi Synagogue, which was the centre of life in the Jewish Quarter. In addition to the Cochin Jews and Paradesi Jews, Mattanchery is also home to Konkanis and Gujaratis, with the Gujarati street in Mattancherry being a cultural icon for Keralite Gujaratis.

== Demographics ==
According to the 2011 census, Mattancherry had a population of 10144, with 5035 males and 5109 females. 10.69% of residents were in the 0-6 age group. 1.00% of residents belonged to Scheduled Castes and 0.00% of residents belonged to Scheduled Tribes. The total literacy rate was 85.70%, with males having a literacy rate of 86.80% and females having a literacy rate of 84.62%

== Notable landmarks ==
Many of the landmarks in Mattancherry are listed as Monuments of National Importance, and notable landmarks include:

- Chempittapally, a copper-roofed 16th-century mosque, built in the Kerala-Islamic style.
- Gujarati Street
- Holy Cross Church, Mattancherry
- Jew Town
- Kadavumbhagam Mattancherry Synagogue
- Kochi Jain temple, a Jain temple
- Mattancherry Palace (The Dutch Palace) - the former residence of the kings of Kochi. The palace was built in 1555 by Veera Kerala Varma (1537–1565), the King of Cochin, was renovated by the Dutch in 1663 and became known as the 'Dutch Palace'. Today, there are portraits of the kings of Kochi and many unique murals in India. The site also includes the Mattancherry Palace Museum.
- Our Lady Of Life Church (Ingreja de Nossa Senhora do Resgate)
- Paradesi Synagogue - India's oldest functioning synagogue, the synagogue was built in 1568 by the Paradesi Jewish people of Kochi. It is also known as the Kochi Jewish Synagogue and the Mattancherry Synagogue. The synagogue is located at what is now known as Jewish Street in Old Kochi. The synagogue was built near the Mattancherry Palace on a site donated by King Rama Varma of Kochi to the Jewish community. There is only one wall between the palace temple and this synagogue.
- Thekkumbhagam Mattancherry Synagogue

== Gallery ==
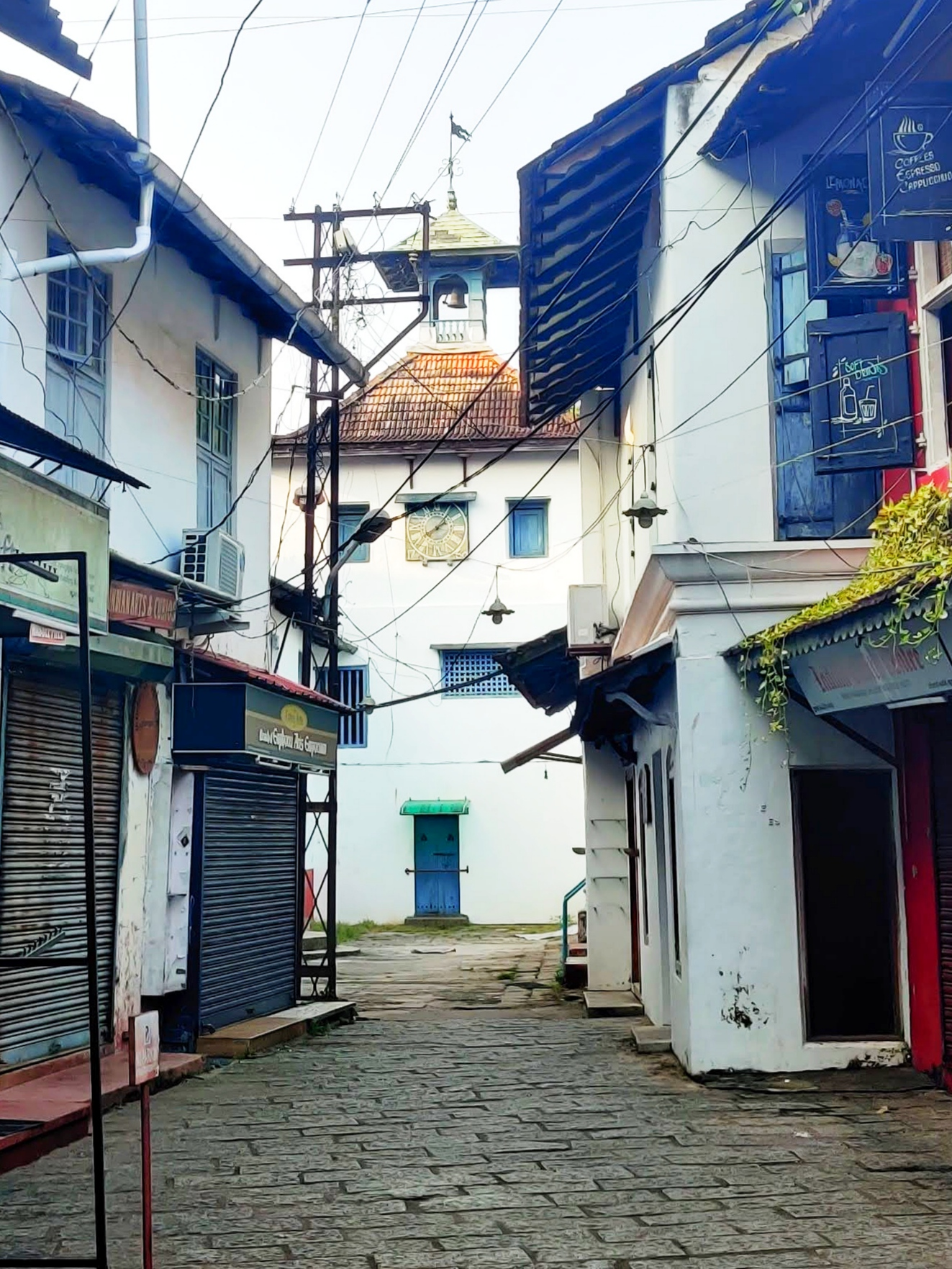
The Paradesi Synagogue is one of the very few active synagogues in Kerala

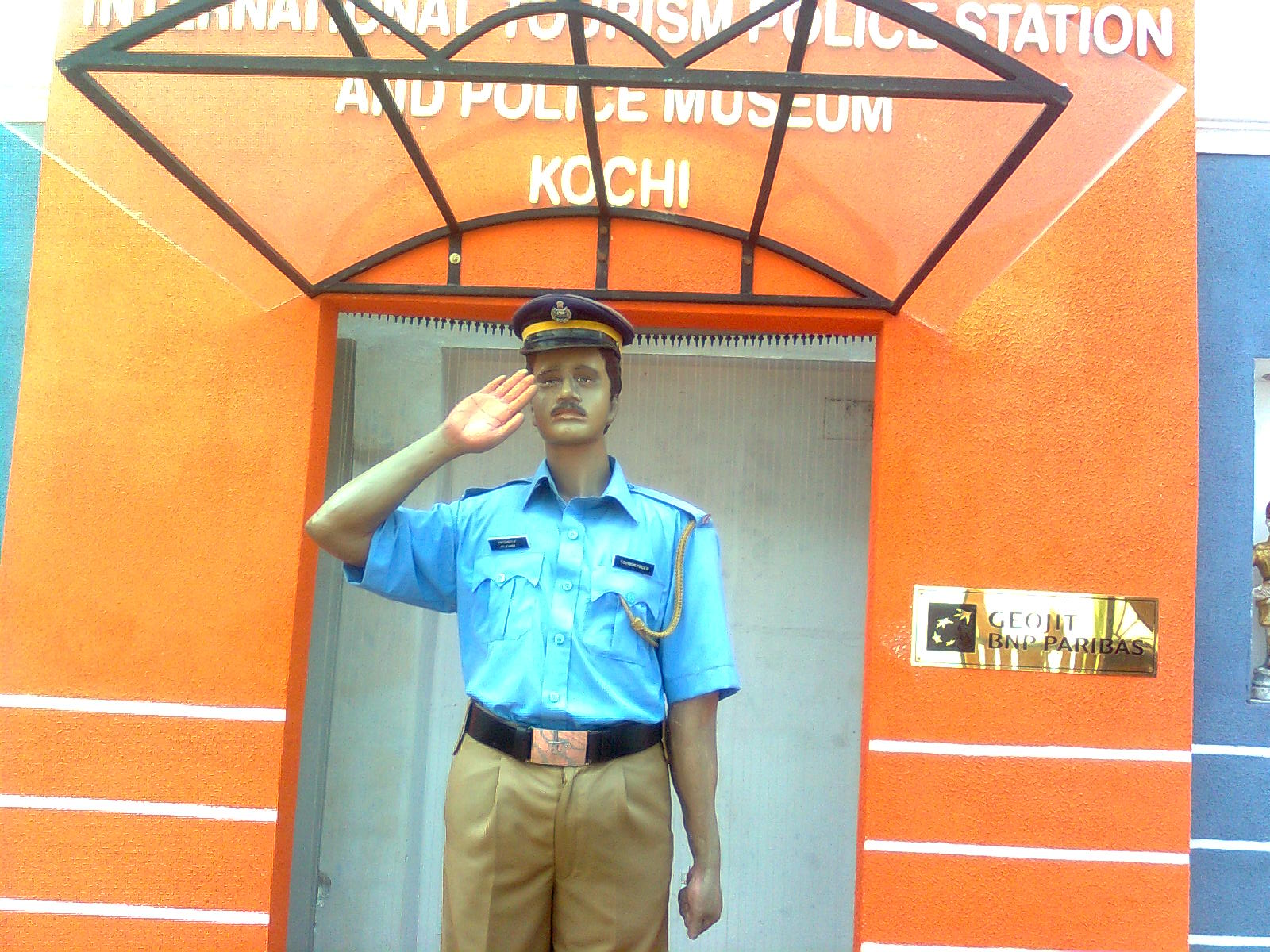
International Tourism Police Museum at Mattancherry

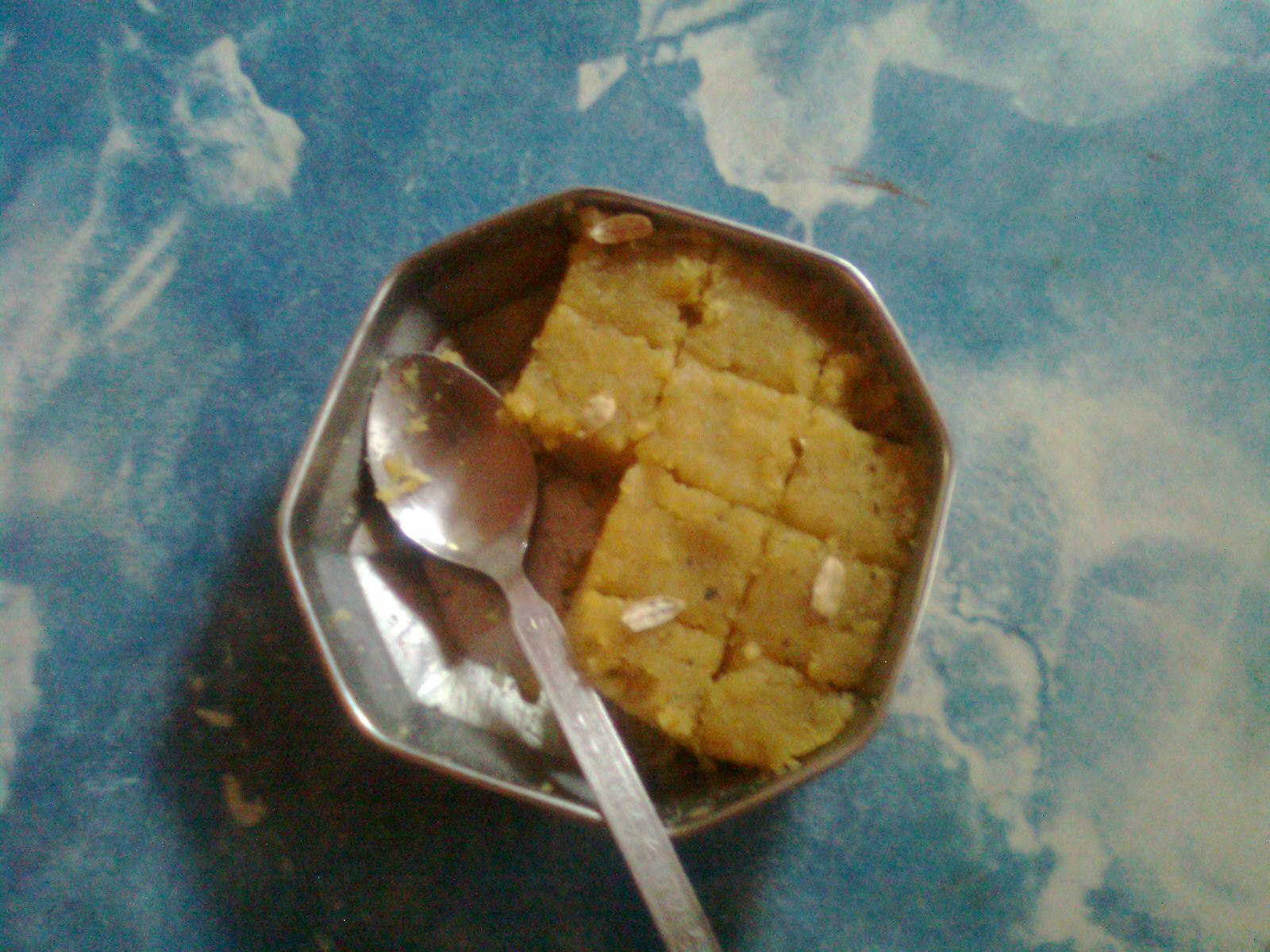
Traditional Mattancherry Sweets Gujarathi

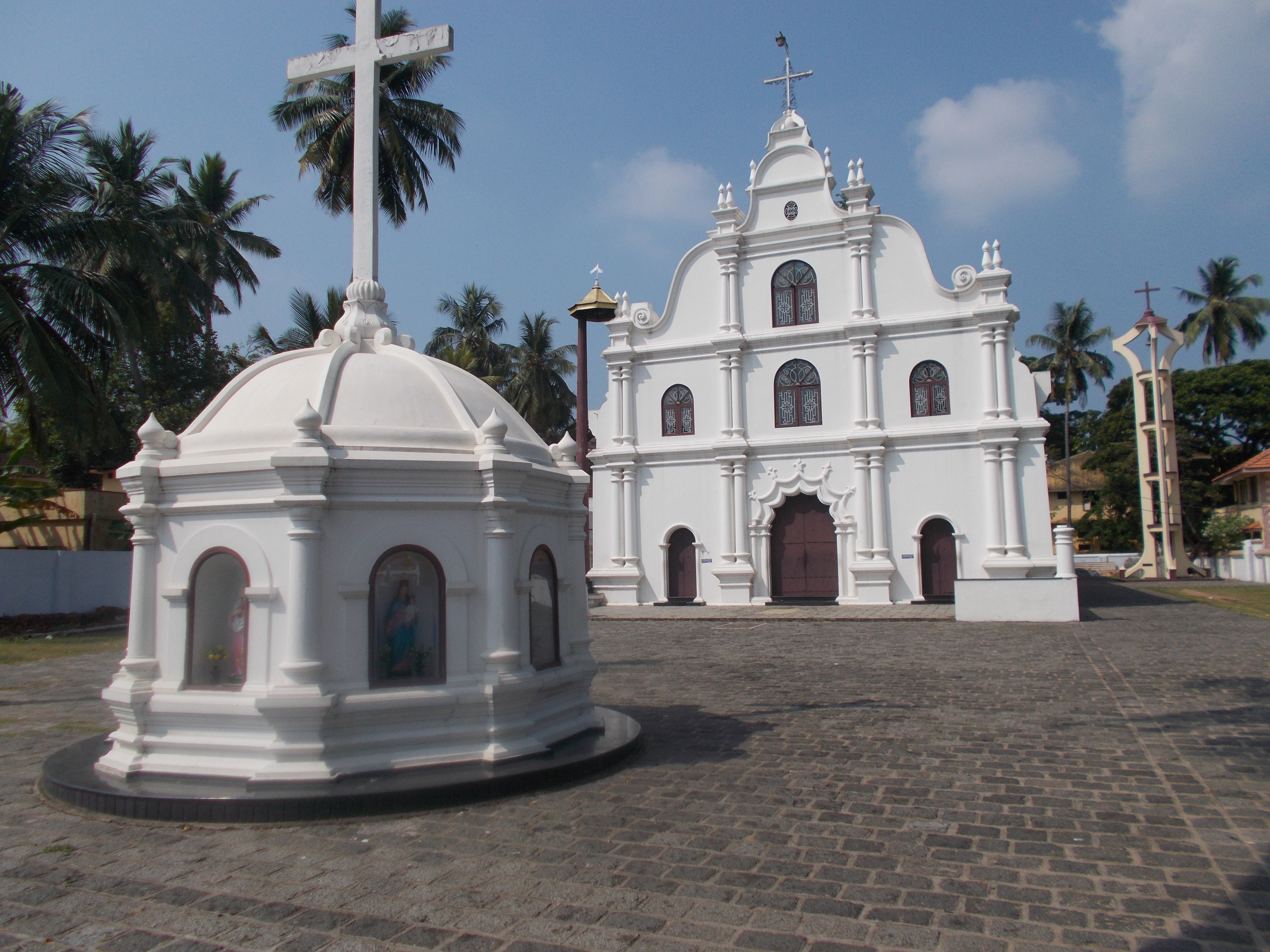
The church of Our Lady of Life in Mattancherry, the site of the historical Coonan Cross Oath.

== Also see ==
- Coonan Cross Oath
- 1953 Mattancherry shootout
