= Panayapilly =

Village in Ernakulam District, Kerala, India

Panayapilly is a village in Ernakulam district near Fort Kochi in the Indian state of Kerala.
