= Mattancherry Palace =

Palace at Mattancherry built by Portughese

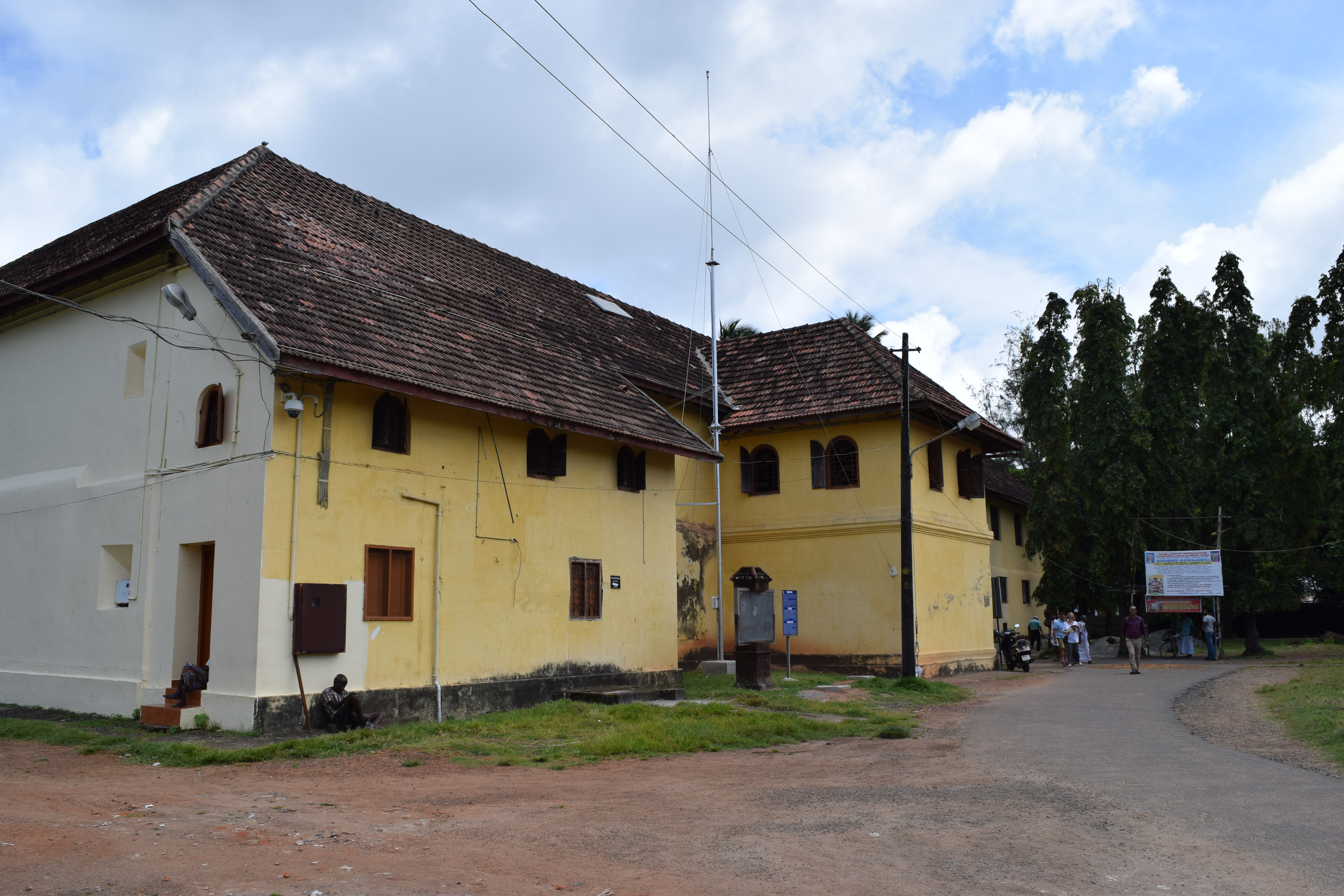

- Location in Kerala, India
- 9.958°N 76.259°E
- Location: Kochi, Kerala, India

History
- Built: 1545

Mattancherry Palace, Walk through Campus

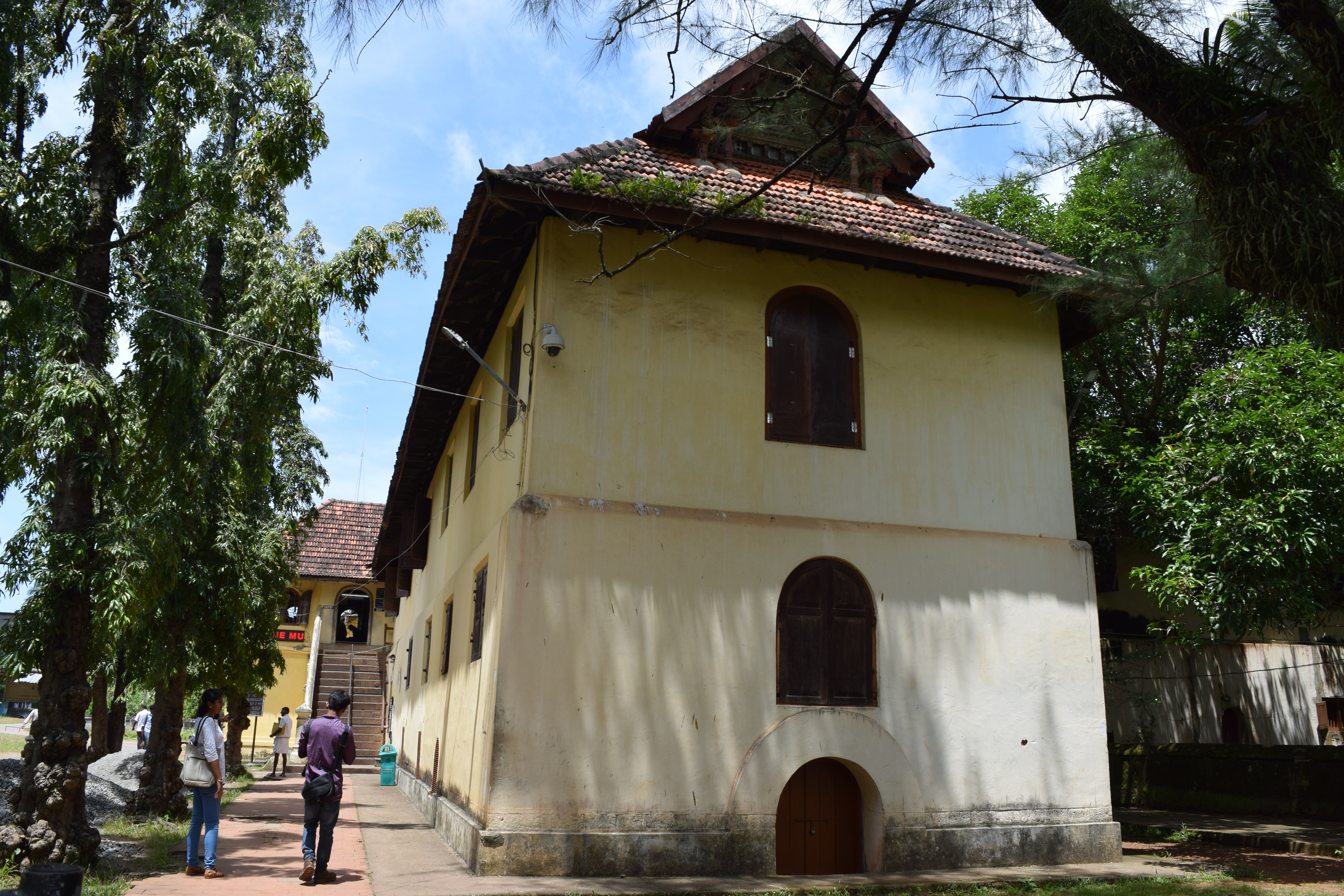
Mattancherry Palace, back side

The Mattancherry Palace is a palace popularly known as the Dutch Palace, in Mattancherry, Kochi, in the Indian state of Kerala which features Kerala murals depicting portraits and exhibits of the Rajas of Kochi. The palace was included in the tentative list of UNESCO World Heritage Sites. Despite the name Dutch Palace, the palace was built by the Portuguese Empire as a gift to the Kingdom of Cochin.

== History ==
The palace was built and gifted by the Portuguese as a present to the king of Cochin, around 1545. It was built to appease the king after they plundered a temple nearby. The landing of Vasco da Gama, the Portuguese explorer, at Kappad in 1498 was welcomed by the Kochi rulers. The Portuguese were given exclusive right to construct factories and they repulsed the repeated attacks of the Zamorians, and the Cochin Rajas practically became vassals of the Portuguese. The influence of the Portuguese was supplanted by the Dutch, and they took over Mattancherry in 1663. Subsequently, the area was taken over by Hyder Ali and still later by the British East India Company.

== Architecture ==
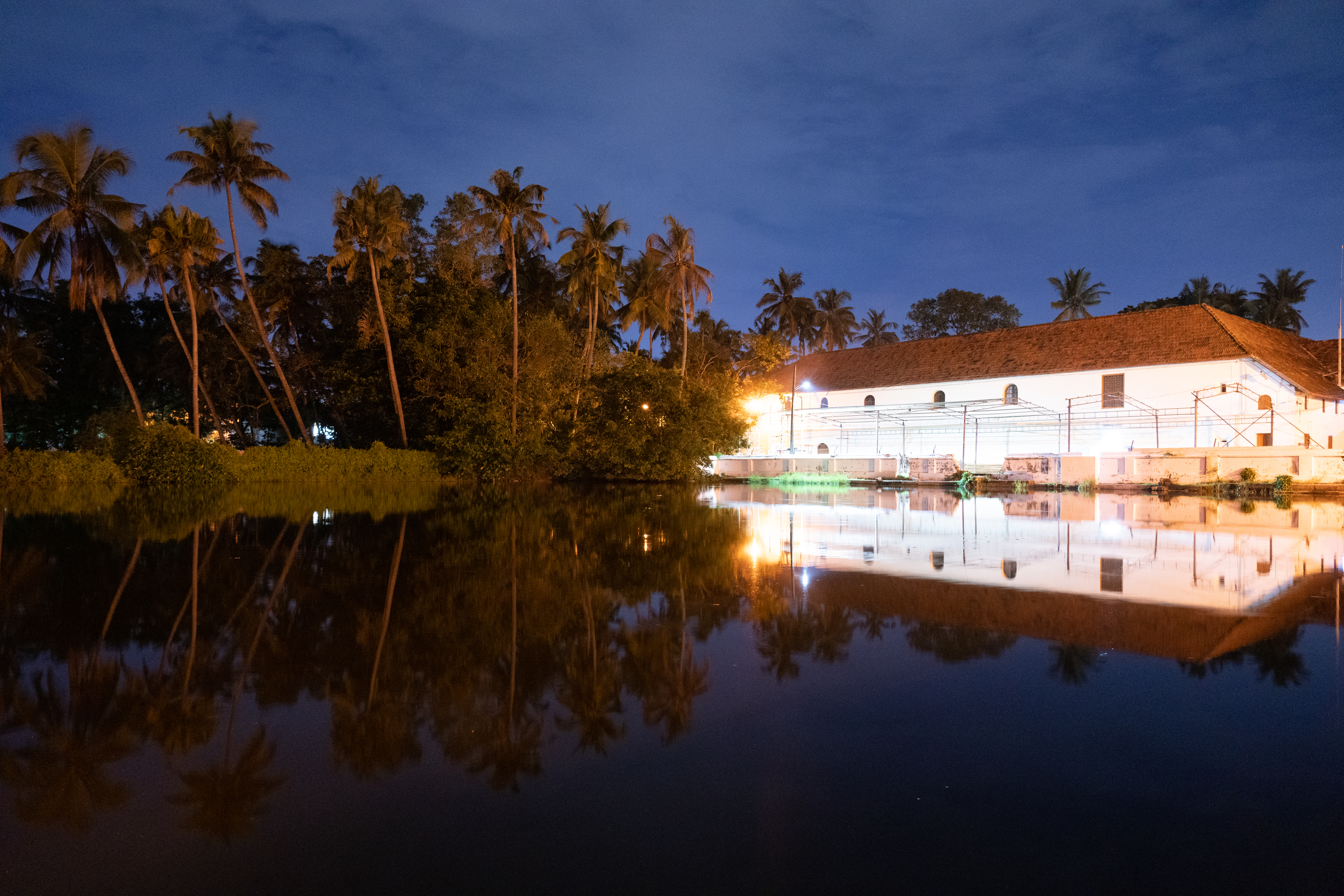
Mattancherry palace at night

The palace is a quadrangular structure built in Nālukettu style, the traditional Kerala style of architecture, with a courtyard in the middle. Certain elements of architecture, as for example the nature of its arches and the proportion of its chambers are indicative of European influence in basic Nālukettu style.

== Murals ==
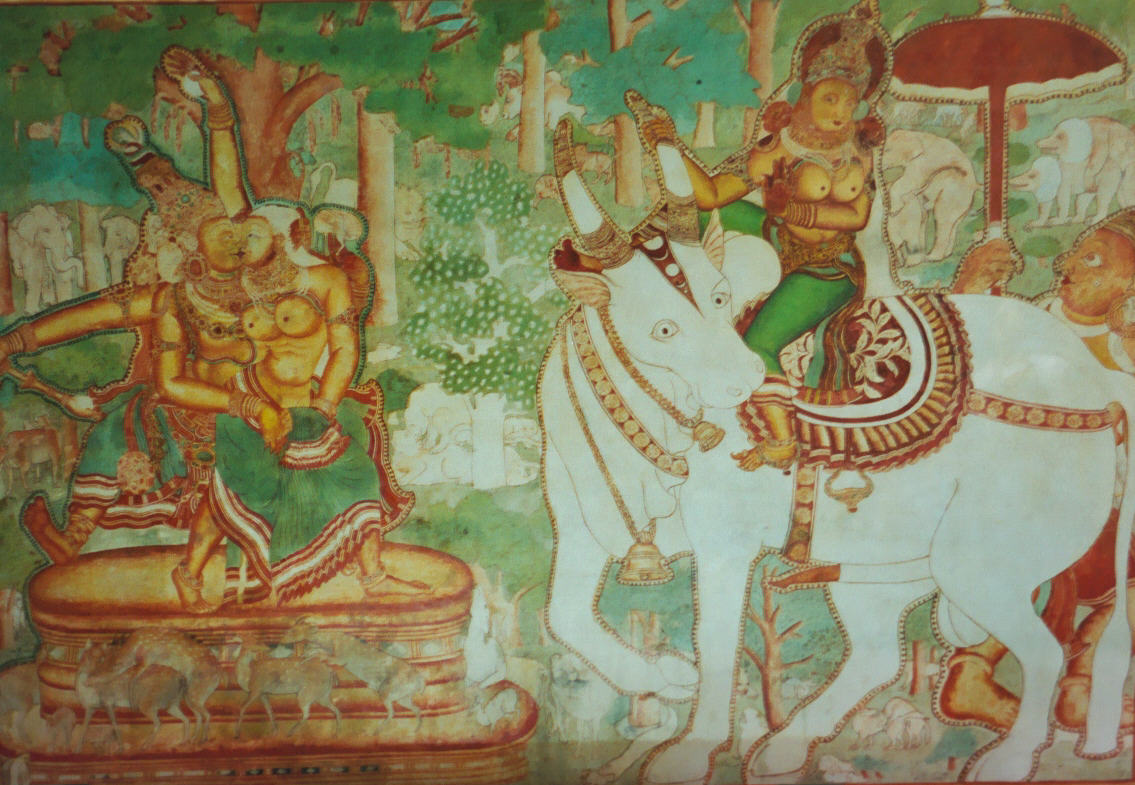
Several murals depicting Hindu religious art adorn the walls of the palace.

There a large number of murals on the walls of the palace, executed in the traditions of Hindu temple art, which are religious, decorative and stylised. The murals have been painted in rich warm colours in tempera technique.

== Other exhibits ==
Portraits of the Rajas of Cochin, from 1864 onwards, are displayed in what was once the Coronation Hall. These were painted by local artists in the western style. The ceiling of the hall is decorated with floral designs in woodcraft. Amongst the other exhibits in the palace are an ivory palanquin, a howdah, royal umbrellas, ceremonial dress used by the royalty, coins, stamps and drawings.

== Restoration ==
In 1951, the palace was restored and declared a central government protected monument. The palace underwent a second restoration by the Archaeological Survey of India. The work which started in 2007 was completed by 2009.
