= Abendana =

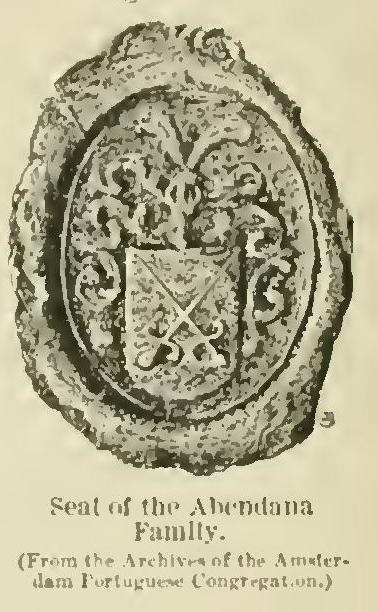
Seal of the Abendana Family. Jewish Encyclopedia

Abendana (Abendanan, Ibn Danan, Hebrew: ן׳דנא, אבן – דנא) is a Sephardi Jewish surname of Arabic origin. Notable people with the name include:

- Jacob Abendana (1630–1695), hakam of London
- Isaac Abendana (c. 1640–1699), hakam of the Spanish Portuguese Synagogue in London
- Isaac Sardo Abendana (c. 1662 – 1709), Dutch Jewish jeweler and diamond merchant

== See also ==
- Kenneth Abendana Spencer (1929–2005), Jamaican artist
