= Abendanon =

Abendanon is a Jewish surname, a variant of Abendana. People with this surname include:

- Nick Abendanon (born 1986), English rugby union footballer
- Maryse Abendanon (born 1966), Dutch field hockey player
- Jacques Henry Abendanon (1852–1925), Minister of Culture, Religion, and Crafts in the Dutch East Indies from 1900 to 1905
- Joseph Abendanon (fl. 17th century), Hebraist and Talmudist
