= Jacob Abendana =

Hakham of London

- Title: Hakham of London

Personal life
- Born: 1630 Spain
- Died: September 12, 1685 (aged 54–55) London, England
- Parent: Joseph Abendana (father)

Religious life
- Religion: Judaism

Jewish leader
- Synagogue: Bevis Marks Synagogue
- Began: 1680
- Ended: 1685

Jacob Abendana (1630 – 12 September 1685) was hakham of London from 1680 until his death.

== Biography ==
Abendana was the eldest son of Joseph Abendana and brother to Isaac Abendana. Though his family originally lived in Hamburg, Jacob and his brother were both born in Spain. At some point in time, his family moved to Amsterdam where he studied at the De los Pintos rabbinical academy in Rotterdam. In 1655, he was appointed hakham of that city. On 3 May 1655 Abendana delivered a famous memorial sermon on the Cordovan martyrs Marranos Nunez and Almeyda Bernal who had been burned at the stake.

Several years later, with his brother, Isaac, Jacob published the Bible commentary Miklal Yofi by Solomon ben Melekh which included his own commentary, Lekket Shikchah (Gleanings), on the Pentateuch, the Book of Joshua, and part of the Book of Judges. This was published by subscription in Amsterdam in 1660 with a second edition in 1685.

Having gone to Leiden seeking subscribers, Jacob met Antonius Hulsius whom he helped in his studies. Hulsius tried to convert Abendana to Christianity which began a lifelong correspondence between the two. The Abendana brothers similarly impressed other Christian scholars, such as Johannes Buxtorf (Basel), Johann Coccejus (Leyden), and Jacob Golius (Leyden).

With Hulsius, Abendana entered into a polemical discussion of Biblical verse Haggai 2:9, which Hulsius attempted to prove was a reference to the Church. The debate lasted via correspondence from 24 September 1659 to 16 June 1660. Abendana responded with a Spanish translation of Rabbi Judah Halevi's Kuzariin 1663. Hulsius eventually published the correspondence between the two in 1669.

In 1675, Abendana addressed the community at the dedication of the new synagogue in Amsterdam. Five years later, in 1680, he was brought to London to succeed Joshua da Silva as hakham of London where he served for 15 years as the hakham of the Bevis Marks Synagogue in London. Over the following years, he completed a Spanish-language translation of the Mishnah, along with the commentaries of Maimonides and Obadiah of Bertinoro. The work was frequently cited by Christian theologians, though it was never published. Jacob Abendana died in London in 1695 and was buried in the Portuguese cemetery at Mile End.

== Sources ==
- Abendana, Jacob in The Jewish Encyclopedia, New York; London : Funk & Wagnalls Company, 1901–06, volume 1, p 53.
