= Jacques de Paiva =

- Died: 17 September 1687 (Tishri 5548); Chennai, Tamil Nadu, India
- Citizenship: Dutch
- Occupations: Diamond and Coral Businessman
- Known for: Golconda diamonds
- Spouse: Hieronima de Paiva

Jacques (Jaime) de Paiva (Pavia, Paivia), a Paradesi Jew of Madras, was a Portuguese Jewish diamond and coral merchant from Amsterdam belonging to the Amsterdam Sephardic community. He was married to Hieronima de Paiva.

After de Paiva's death, his wife Hieronima de Paiva, also a Portuguese Jew, fell in love with Elihu Yale, Governor of Madras, and went to live with him, causing quite a scandal within Madras colonial society. Governor Yale later achieved fame when he gave a large donation to the University of New Haven in Connecticut, which was then named after him – Yale University. Hieromima de Paiva and the son she had with him died in South Africa.

== Golconda diamonds ==
De Paiva established good relations with East India Company (EIC) and those in power, which enabled him to buy several mines to source Golconda diamonds. Through his efforts, Jews were permitted to live and trade Golconda diamonds and corals within Fort St. George. De Paiva died in 1687 after a visit to his mines of Golconda diamonds and was buried in the Jewish cemetery which he had established in Peddanaickenpet, which later became the north Mint Street, alongside the synagogue which also existed at Mint Street. On his tombstone we find that he died in the month of Tishri 5548 / 1687 CE.

== Philanthropy ==
De Paiva organized the Jews into the semblance of a community and established Madras Jewish community. He built the Second Madras Synagogue and Jewish Cemetery Chennai, Peddanaickenpet.
