= Isaac Sardo Abendana =

Dutch Jewish diamond merchant (1662–1709)

- Born: c. 1662; Holland, Netherlands
- Died: 10 May 1709 (aged 49); Fort St. George, Madras, Tamil Nadu
- Occupations: Diamond merchant and jeweler

Isaac Sardo Abendana (Note: Abendana's grave refers to him as Isaac Abendana Sardo of Madras.) (c. 1662 – 10 May 1709) was a Dutch Jewish jeweller and diamond merchant of Madras, India. Originally from Holland, Abendana moved to India in 1702. Due to his skill in the trade, Abendana was widely consulted, including by most Madras trading companies and by his close friend, Thomas Pitt, the governor of Fort St. George.

== Biography ==
Originally from Holland, Netherlands, Isaac Sardo Abendana was born c. 1662 and left for India around 1702. He settled in Pulicat, Tamil Nadu, before moving to Fort St. George, Madras with his family. He was part of a Jewish colony of merchants in Fort St. George, working in the trade of precious stones and coral, who were of the Jewish diaspora. He worked with English merchant Alvarez da Fonseca.

Abendana knew Hebrew. Due to his skill in the cutting, polishing and appraisal of diamonds, Abendana was widely consulted and his advice was well-sought; he became a scientific advisor to most Madras trading companies. A personal friend of then-Governor Thomas Pitt, who also consulted him, Abendana is believed to be responsible for his fortune and for acquiring the Regent Diamond.

=== Death, testament and widow ===
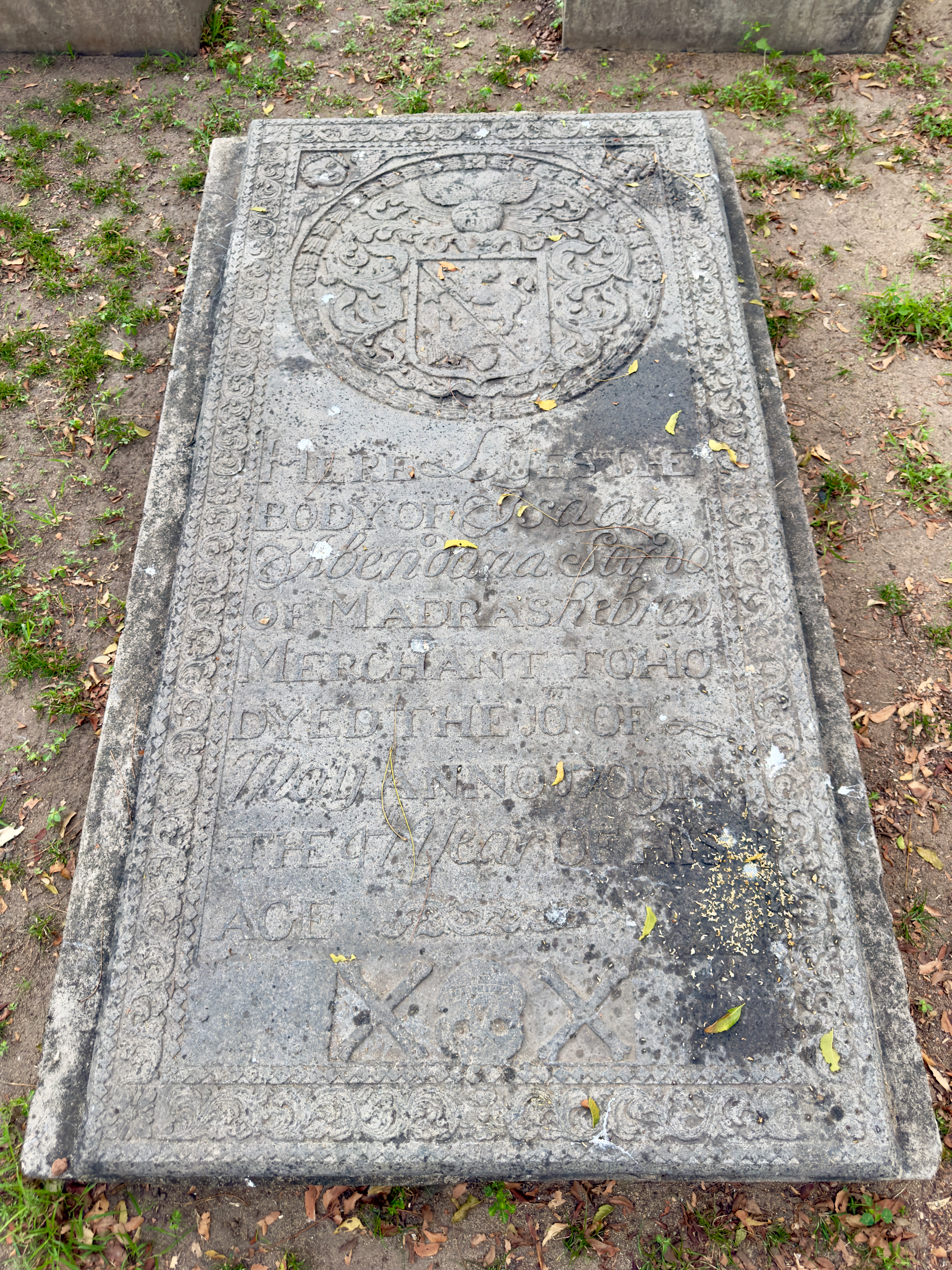
The tombstone of Isaac Abendana

Here lies the body of Isᴀᴀᴄ Aʙᴇɴᴅᴀɴᴀ Sᴀʀᴅᴏ of Madras, Hebrew merchant, who died the 10th of May anno 1709, in the 49th year of his age. (Coat of Arms.)

— Inscription upon Isaac Sardo Abendana's tombstone in Fort St. George

Abendana died on 10 May 1709, in Fort St. George, where he was buried. His was one of the few Jewish tombstones in the Fort to have been preserved. The tombstone was relocated to the Jewish Cemetery Chennai on Mint Street. (Note: Abendana's tombstone was still preserved as of 1960. The Second Jewish Cemetery was partly demolished in 1934 and the tombstones were moved to the Central Park of Madras. In 1983, the tombstones were moved to Lloyds Road.)

Although he appointed Pitt the trustee of his estate in his testament, the governor declined as he was about to leave India. As Abendana's widow was illiterate, four people were nominated to go through his papers. The court records describe his testament as being written in "certain characters and other numerous abbreviations" unknown to them, probably Hebrew.

According to Professor Walter Joseph Fischel, "[t]he history of his widow [and] her "case" is discussed very extensively in the [court] records." In a letter from then-Governor Edward Harrison and Council to the Court of Directors, dated September 16, 1713, Harrison mentioned that a "turbulent" Danish missionary (Note: According to Julian James Cotton, the Danish missionary was likely J.G. Bovingh.) had contrived the widow's "escape" from her creditors to the town of Tranquebar. There, in 1712, she married a German Lutheran. Although Madras had no synagogue, Abendana's testament stipulates that if his wife were to remarry, it should be in a city with one. The litigation which ensured after the marriage was documented at the Madras Record Office; Fischel later said that this was a "very embarrassing scandal."
