= Jewish cemetery, Chennai =

Cemetery in India

Coordinates: 13.0467369°N 80.2742703°E

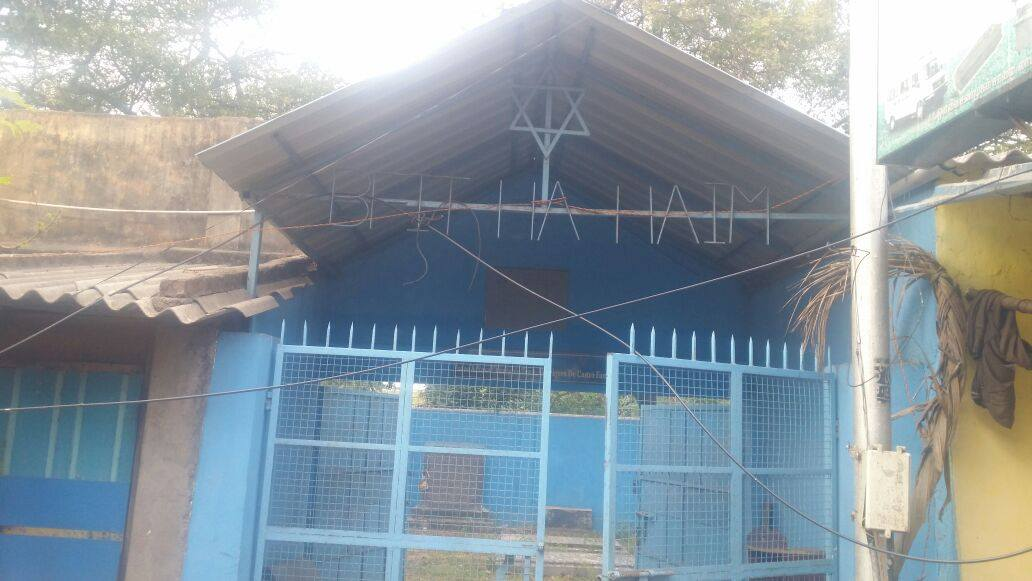
Jewish Cemetery Chennai Front View

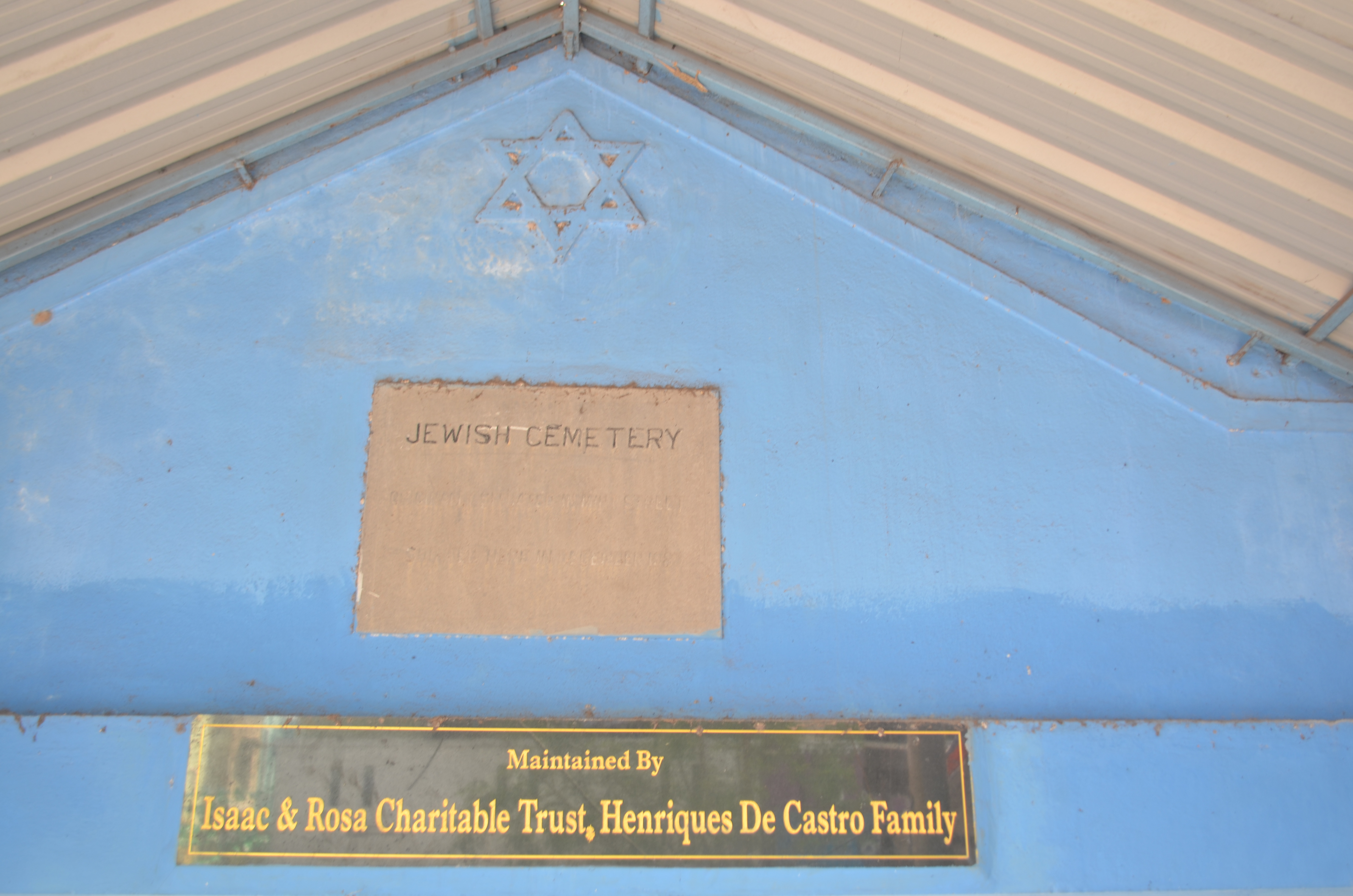
Jewish cemetery chennai

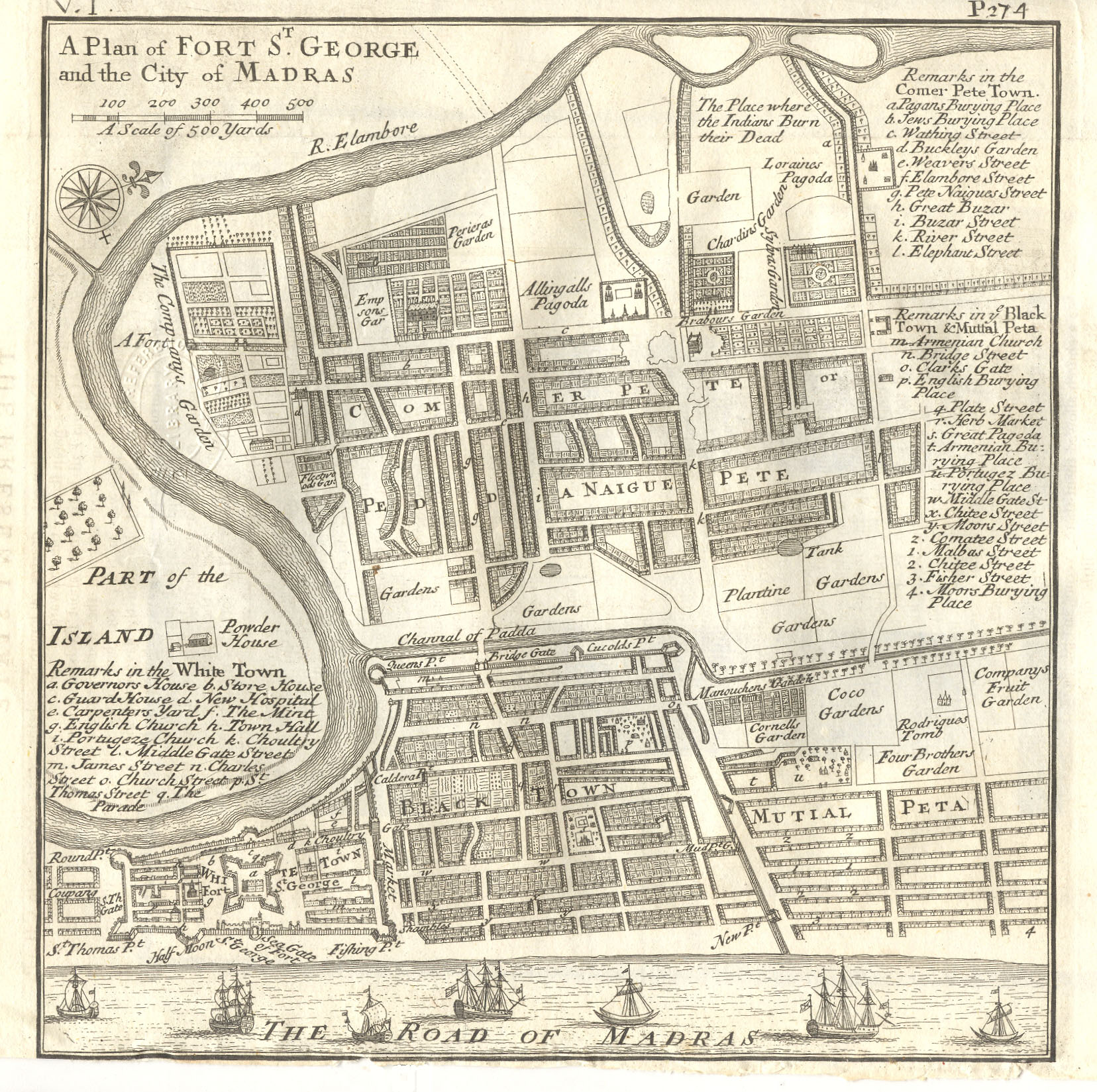
Plan of Fort St George and the city of Madras in 1726, Shows b.Jews Burying Place Jewish Cemetery Chennai, Four Brothers Garden and Bartolomeo Rodrigues Tomb

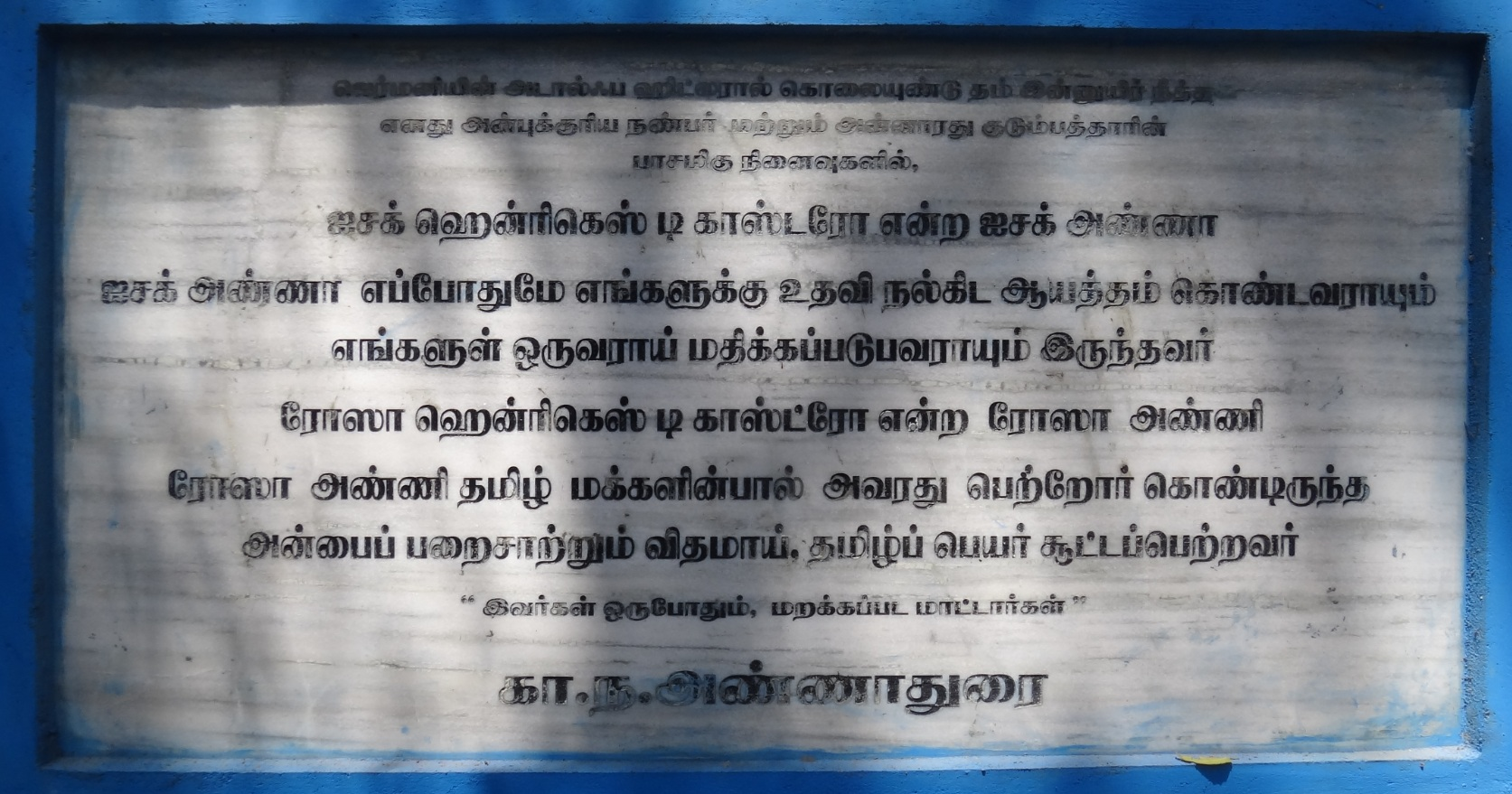
Holocaust Memorial of Isaac & Rosa Henriques Decastro, erected by C. N. Annadurai Former Chief Minister of Tamil Nadu

The Jewish Cemetery is a cemetery for the Paradesi Jews of Chennai, India. It is located off Lloyd's Road. The cemetery remains the only physical record of the historical Jewish presence in the City. Burials include the tombstones of 18th-century Jewish diamond merchants. The cemetery houses fewer than 30 graves, of which a handful are almost 300 years old.

The cemetery is located on a market area of the road west of the Marina Fish Market and is adjacent to Baháʼí and Chinese cemeteries. Among the graves is that of Victoria 'Toyah' Sofaer, who was born into an elite Baghdadi family and died in Madras in 1943, aged 22. the story of her life and tragically young death was investigated by the BBC.

The cemetery formerly used to have an iron gate on which a plaque was attached on which a Star of David and the words "Jewish Cemetery" were inscribed. After the renovation around 2016, these doors were replaced with sturdier ones. Before the renovation, the cemetery had been reported to be in a state of severe disrepair – with rusted iron gates, partially grown shrubs, and cracked walls. People in the surrounding area were oblivious to the existence and historical importance of the cemetery. As of 2016, it had few visitors.

== History ==
1500 The first Jewish Cemetery was built by Amsterdam Sephardic community in Coral Merchant Street, George Town, Madras, which had a large presence of Portuguese Jews in the seventeenth and eighteenth centuries. Neither the synagogue nor the Jewish population remains today.

1644 The Second Jewish Cemetery was built by Jacques (Jaime) de Paiva (Pavia) also from Amsterdam Sephardic community, in Peddanaickenpet, which later became the South end of Mint Street,

1687 Jacques (Jaime) de Paiva (Pavia) was buried in the cemetery upon his death in 1687.

1934 The Second Jewish Cemetery was partly demolished by the local government and the tombstones were moved to the Central Park of Madras along with the gate of the cemetery on which Beit ha-Haim (the usual designation for a Jewish cemetery, literally "House of Life") were written in Hebrew.

5 June 1968 Local government fully demolished The Second Jewish Cemetery and took over the land for building a government school. The remaining tombstones were moved opposite to Kasimedu cemetery.

29 December 1983 The tombstones from Central Park of Madras and opposite to Kasimedu cemetery were moved to Lloyds Road when the Chennai Harbour expansion project was approved. 17 tombstones went missing in the process, including that of Jacques (Jaime) de Paiva (Pavia).

The cemetery is under the care of the Isaac and Rosa Charitable Trust, Henriques De Castro family.

2012 Two walls of the cemetery came down during the Cyclone Nilam. The cost for repair was projected to be $2070.

2016 The cemetery had been renovated by Isaac and Rosa Charitable Trust, Henriques De Castro family, and the walls were re-erected. The walls were painted blue and raised to avoid trespassers and dog menace.

== Image gallery ==
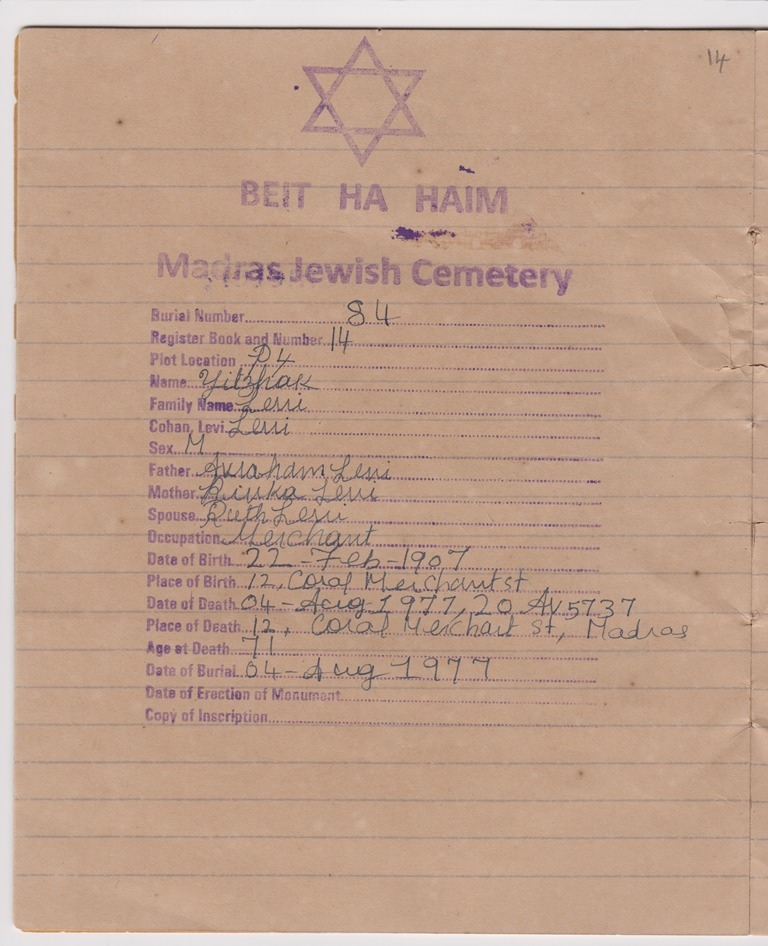
Burial Record of Yitzhak Levi

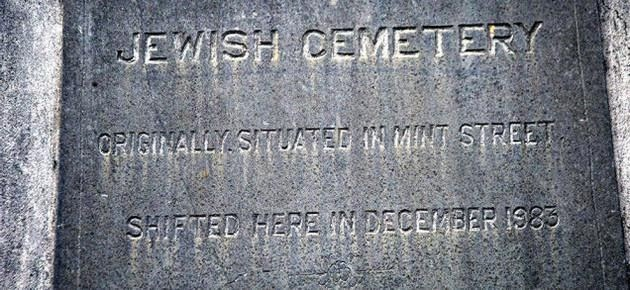
Jewish Cemetery shifting in Chennai 1983

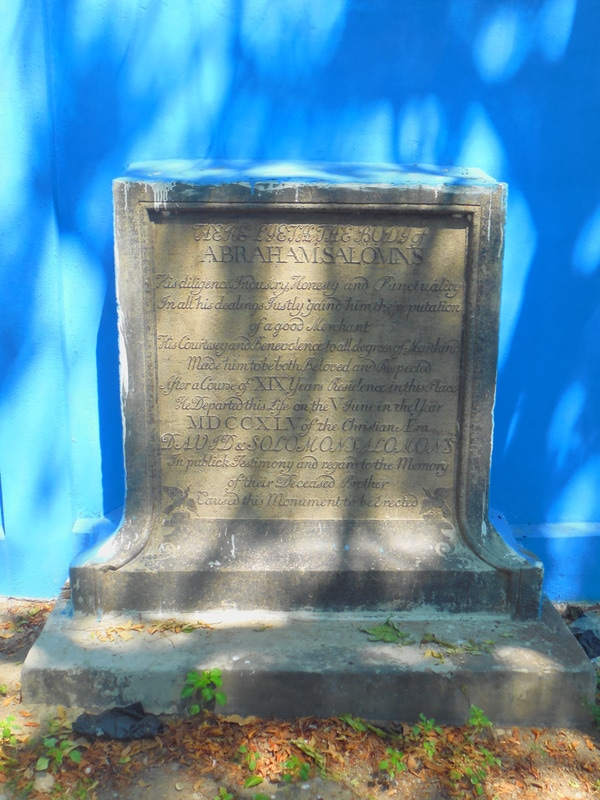
The gravestone of Abraham Salomons, 1745

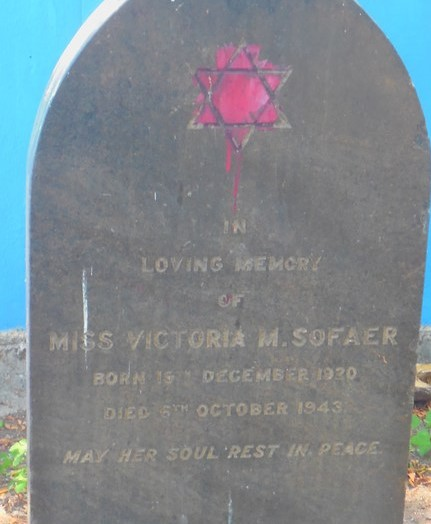
The gravestone of Victoria 'Toyah' Sofaer, 1943
