= Joseph ibn Danon =

Sephardic Jewish Hebraist and Talmudist (fl. 17th century)

Personal life
- Born: Belgrade, Sanjak of Smederevo, Ottoman Empire
- Died: London, Kingdom of Great Britain

Religious life
- Religion: Judaism

Joseph ben Jacob ben Moses ibn Danon (Hebrew: יוסף בן יעקב בן משה אבן דאנון, romanized: Yosef ben Yaʿaḳov ben Mošeh ibn Danon; fl. 17th century), (Note: Zdenko Levntal gives his year of death as 1740. According to Gaster, he died in 5487 AM (1726 or 1726).) also known as Joseph Abendanon, was a Hebraist and Talmudist.

== Biography ==
Joseph ibn Danon was born in Belgrade into an old Spanish family which had settled there several generations earlier. Having received an excellent education, he became the secretary of Rabbi Joseph Almosnino. During this period, Ibn Danon collected Almosnino's responsa, sermons, obituaries and other writings in over 400 notebooks.

When Belgrade was conquered by Maximilian II Emanuel in September 1688, Ibn Danon, along with much of the Jewish community, was exiled. For some time, he—along with his wife and son Moses—lived a precarious life in various Moravian towns, relying sometimes upon public charity for food and shelter. They first migrated to Nicolsburg with Almosino, and from there to Kremsyr and Prague. Eventually, they made his way to Amsterdam, where they received aid and protection from Joseph ben Nathaniel Sarfati, brother-in-law of the printer Nathanael Foa.

Ibn Danon now devoted himself to literary pursuits, and wrote a work entitled Sheloshah sarigim ('Three Branches', 1890), a treatise on the three foundations upon which, according to the Talmud (Avot i. 2), the world is based—the Law, Worship, and Charity. The first part only of this manuscript work, with its preface, is still extant. During his residence in Amsterdam he also composed an index of the abbreviations found in Hezekiah de Silva's Peri Ḥadash, a commentary on Joseph Karo's Shulḥan 'Arukh.

At the death of his patron in 1690, Danon settled in London, where he served as a teacher assistant at the Talmud Torah. He remained there until his death.
