= Isaac Abendana =

Spanish-born Jewish scholar (died 1699)

- Born: Isaac Abendana c. 1640; Spain
- Died: 17 July 1699; London, England
- Other name: Rabbi Isaac Abendana
- Occupations: Hebrew scholar, translator, religious leader
- Years active: 1662–1699
- Known for: First complete Latin translation of the Mishnah; Hebrew teaching at Cambridge and Oxford; Discourses on the Ecclesiastical and Civil Polity of the Jews
- Notable work: Discourses on the Ecclesiastical and Civil Polity of the Jews (1706); Latin translation of the Mishnah (1671, unpublished)
- Relatives: Jacob Abendana (brother); David Abendana (grandfather)

Isaac Abendana (c. 1640–1699) was a Spanish-born Jewish scholar, translator, and religious leader who became a pioneering figure in Hebrew studies at English universities during the Restoration period. Born into a Marrano family that had been forced to convert from Judaism to Christianity during the Spanish Inquisition, he was the younger brother of Jacob Abendana and the grandson of David Abendana, one of the founders of Amsterdam's first synagogue. He became hakam of the Spanish Portuguese Synagogue in London after his brother died.

== Early life ==
Isaac Abendana was born in Spain around 1640. He was the younger brother of Jacob Abendana. Abendana arrived in England in 1662, making him one of the first practicing Jews to teach at English universities since the medieval expulsion of 1290.

== Academic career ==
From 1663, Isaac taught Hebrew at both Cambridge and Oxford universities, receiving an annual retaining fee of £6 from Trinity College, Cambridge during 1664–66. His most significant scholarly achievement was producing the first complete Latin translation of the Mishnah in 1671, a six-volume manuscript work commissioned by Cambridge University that remained unpublished but was later used by Christian scholar Guilielmus Surenhusius for his own Latin edition. During this period, Abendana corresponded with Robert Boyle, Edward Pococke, and Henry Oldenburg. While he was at Cambridge, Abendana sold Hebrew books to the Bodleian Library of Oxford. After relocating to Oxford in 1689, Abendana taught Hebrew at Magdalen College.

== Scholarly work and legacy ==
At Oxford, Isaac compiled annual Jewish calendars (almanacs) for Christian readers from 1692 to 1699, which he later republished as Discourses on the Ecclesiastical and Civil Polity of the Jews (1706)—one of the first comprehensive explanations of Judaism written in English. He maintained extensive correspondence with leading Christian scholars, including with the philosopher Ralph Cudworth, master of Christ's College, Cambridge. Abendana contributed significantly to Jewish-Christian intellectual dialogue during a formative period in Anglo-Jewish history.
