= History of the Jews in India =

The history of the Jews in India dates back to antiquity. Judaism was one of the first foreign religions to arrive in the Indian subcontinent in recorded history. Rabbi Eliezer ben Jose of the 2nd-century AD mentions the Jewish people of India (Hebrew: הנדויים, romanized: Hindu'im, lit. 'Hindus') in his work Mishnat Rabbi Eliezer, saying that they are required to ask for rain in the summer months (during their regular rainy season), yet make use of the format found for winter in the Amidah and cite it in the blessing "Hear our Voice" (שמע קולנו השם אלקינו, Sh'ma koleinu HaShem Elokeinu). Desi Jews are a small religious minority who have lived in the region since antiquity. They were able to survive for centuries despite persecution by Portuguese colonizers and non-native antisemitic inquisitions.

The better-established Jewish communities have assimilated many of the local traditions through cultural diffusion. While some Indian Jews have stated that their ancestors arrived during the time of the biblical Kingdom of Judah, others claim descent from the Ten Lost Tribes of the pre-Judaic Israelites who arrived in India earlier. Still some other Indian Jews contend that they descend from the Israelite Tribe of Manasseh, and they are referred to as the Bnei Menashe.

The Jewish population in British India peaked at around 20,000 in the mid-1940s, according to some estimates, with others putting the number as high as 50,000, but the community declined rapidly due to emigration to the newly formed state of Israel after 1948. The Indian Jewish community now comprises 4,429 people according to the latest census.

== Demographics ==
Historical population of Indian Jews
Year	Pop.	±% p.a.
1872	7,626	—
1881	12,009	+5.17%
1891	17,194	+3.65%
1901	18,228	+0.59%
1911	20,980	+1.42%
1921	21,778	+0.37%
1931	24,141	+1.04%
1941	22,480	−0.71%
1951	19,302	−1.51%
1961	16,376	−1.63%
1971	12,256	−2.86%
1981	9,342	−2.68%
1991	7,196	−2.58%
2001	4,868	−3.83%
2011	3,624	−2.91%

== Jewish groups in India ==
Map of Jewish communities in India. Greyed out labels indicate ancient or premodern communities

In addition to Jewish expatriates and recent immigrants, there are a number of Jewish groups in India:

- Among the many theories noted by Shalva Weil as to the origin of Malabar Cochin Jews, they claim to have first arrived in India together with the Hebrew king Solomon's merchants. The fair-complexioned component is of European-Jewish descent, both Ashkenazi and Sephardi.
- Madras Jews: The Spanish and Portuguese Jews, Paradesi Jews and British Jews arrived at Madras during the 16th century. They were diamond businesspeople of Sephardi and Ashkenazi heritage. Following expulsion from Iberia in 1492 by the Alhambra Decree, a few families of Sephardic Jews eventually made their way to Madras in the 16th century. They maintained trade connections to Europe, and their language skills were useful. Although the Sephardim mostly spoke Judaeo-Spanish (i.e., Ladino), in India they learned Tamil and Judeo-Malayalam from the Malabar Jews.
- Nagercoil Jews: The Syrian Jews and Musta'arabi Jews were Arab Jews who arrived at Nagercoil and Kanyakumari District in 52 AD along with the supposed arrival of Thomas the Apostle, likely making them Christians in reality. Most of them were merchants and had also settled around the town of Thiruvithamcode. By the turn of the 20th century, most of the families made their way to Cochin and eventually migrated to Israel. In their early days, they maintained trade connections to Europe through the nearby ports of Colachal and Thengaipattinam, and their language skills were useful to the Travancore kings. As historians Daniel Tyerman and George Bennett cited, the reason for this group of Jews selecting Nagercoil as their settlement was the town's salubrious climate and its significant Christian population.
- The Jews of Goa: These were Sephardic Jews from Spain and Portugal who fled to Goa after the commencement of the Inquisition in those countries. The community consisted mainly of Jews who had been forcibly converted to Christianity but wanted to remain Portuguese subjects, instead of immigrating to countries where they could practice Judaism openly (e.g. Morocco and Ottoman Empire). They were the primary targets of the Goa Inquisition. As a result, its members fled to parts of India outside Portuguese control.
- The main branch of the Native Bene Israel community is said to have arrived at the Konkan Coast in ancient times. They are completely mingled in the native culture. They believe that their ancestors fled Judea during the persecution under Antiochus Epiphanes and arrived on Indian soil after seven people survived a shipwreck near the Nagaon village on the Konkan Coast in 175 BC.
- Another branch of the Bene Israel community resided in Karachi until the Partition of India in 1947, when they fled to India (in particular, to Mumbai). Many of them also moved to Israel. The Jews from the Sindh, Punjab, and Pathan areas are often incorrectly called Bene Israel Jews. The Jewish community that used to reside in other parts of what became Pakistan (such as Lahore or Peshawar) also fled to India in 1947, similarly to the larger Karachi Jewish community.
- The Baghdadi Jews arrived in the city of Surat from Iraq (and other Arab states), Iran and Afghanistan about 250 years ago, in the mid 18th and 19th centuries.
- The Bnei Menashe ("children of Manasseh") are Mizo and Kuki tribespeople in Manipur and Mizoram who are recent converts to Rabbinic Judaism but claim ancestry reaching back to the lost Ten Lost Tribes of Israel—specifically, one of the sons of Joseph.
- Similarly, the small Telugu-speaking group, the Bene Ephraim ("children of Ephraim") claim ancestry from Ephraim, one of the sons of Joseph and a Lost Tribe of Israel. Also called Telugu Jews, they have observed Rabbinic Judaism since 1981.

European Jewish immigrants to India escaping persecution during World War II account for a small portion of Jewish Indians today. From 1938 to 1947, about 200 Jews fled from Europe and sought asylum in India. Over seventy years later, the descendants of these Jewish migrants have made their own Jewish-Indian mixed community and culture within India.

== Cochin Jews ==
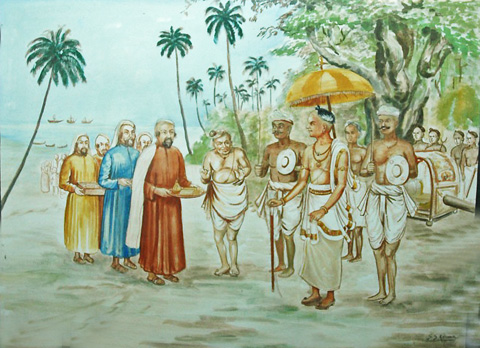
The Arrival of the Jewish pilgrims at Cochin, A.D. 68

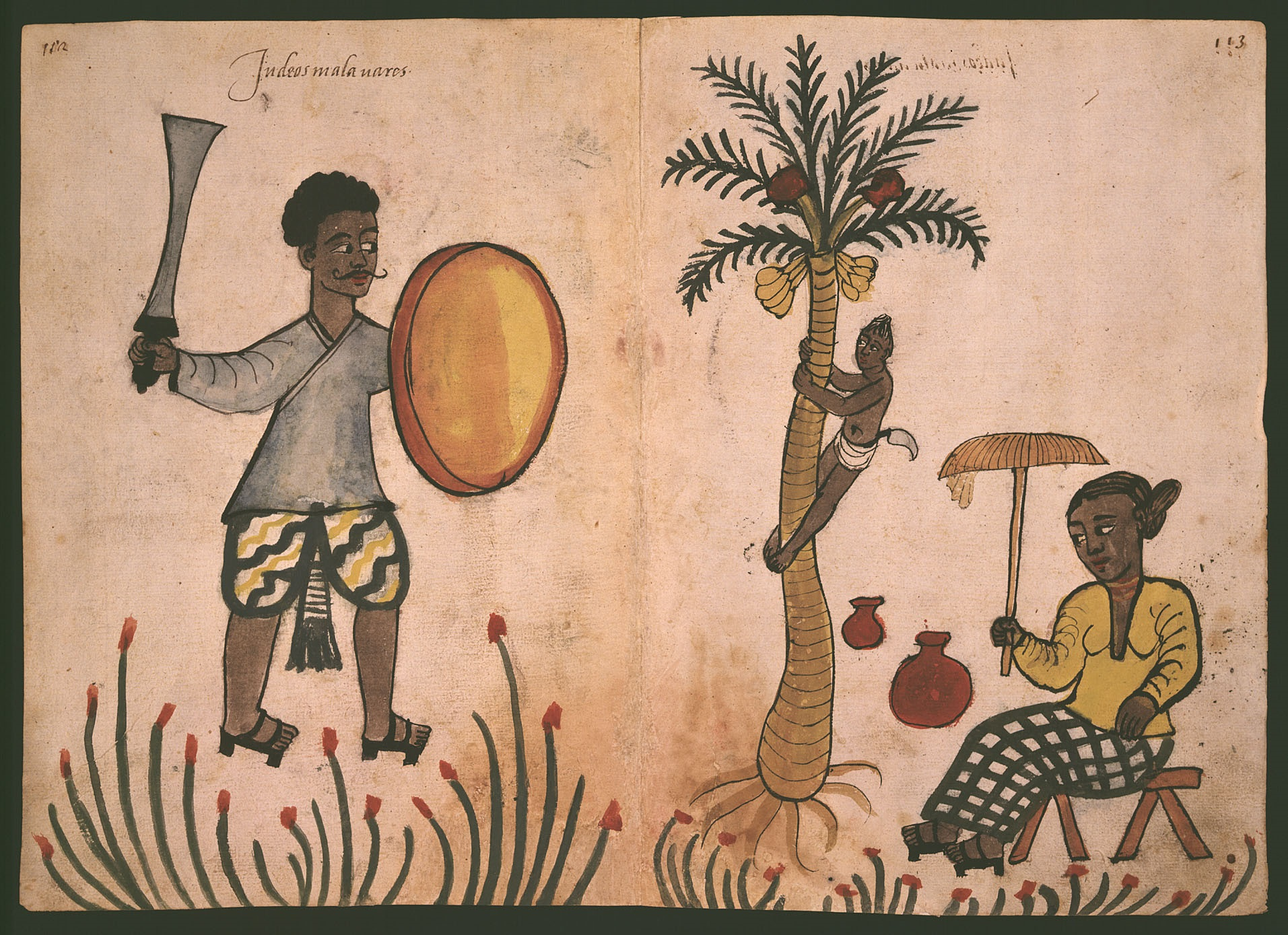
"Malabarese Jews", as depicted by the Portuguese in the 16th century Códice Casanatense

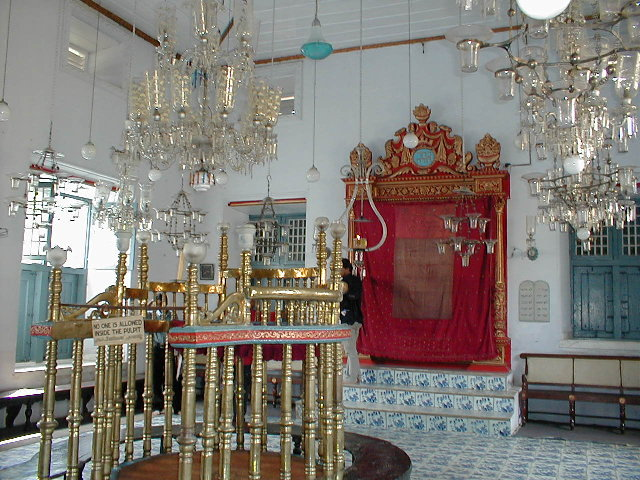
The Paradesi Synagogue in Kochi is an active 16th century synagogue

The oldest of the Indian Jewish communities was in the erstwhile Cochin Kingdom. The traditional account is that traders of Judea arrived at Cranganore, an ancient port near Cochin in 562 BC, and that more Jews came as exiles from Israel in the year 70 AD, after the destruction of the Second Temple. Many of these Jews' ancestors passed on the account that they settled in India when the Hebrew King Solomon was in power. This was a time when teak wood, ivory, spices, monkeys, and peacocks were popular in trade in Cochin.

There is no specific date or reason mentioned as to why they arrived in India, but Hebrew scholars date it to up to around the early Middle Ages. Cochin is a group of small tropical islands filled with markets and many different cultures such as Dutch, Hindu, Jewish, Portuguese, and British. The distinct Jewish community was called Anjuvannam. The still-functioning synagogue in Mattancherry belongs to the Paradesi Jews, the descendants of Sephardim who were expelled from Spain in 1492, although the Jewish community in Mattancherry adjacent to Fort Cochin had only six remaining members as of 2015.

Central to the history of the Cochin Jews is their close relationship with Indian rulers, and this was eventually codified on a set of copper plates granting the community special privileges. The date of these plates, known as "Sâsanam", is contentious. The plates themselves provide a date of 379 AD, but in 1925, the tradition was setting it as 1069 AD, Joseph Rabban by Bhaskara Ravi Varma, the fourth ruler of Maliban granted the copper plates to the Jews. The plates were inscribed with a message stating that the village of Anjuvannam belonged to the Jews and that they were the rightful lords of Anjuvannam and it should remain theirs and be passed on to their Jewish descendants "so long as the world and moon exist". This is the earliest document that shows that the Jews were living in India permanently. It is stored in Cochins main synagogue.

The Jews settled in Kodungallur (Cranganore) of the Malabar region, where they traded peacefully until 1524. The Jewish leader Rabban was granted the rank of prince over the Jews of Cochin, given the rulership and tax revenue of a pocket principality in Anjuvannam, near Cranganore, and rights to seventy-two "free houses". The Hindu king permitted in perpetuity (or, in the more poetic expression of those days, "as long as the world and moon exist") for Jews to live freely, build synagogues, and own property "without conditions attached".

A link back to Rabban, "the king of Shingly" (another name for Cranganore), was a sign of both purity and prestige. Rabban's descendants maintained this distinct community until a chieftainship dispute broke out between two brothers, one of them named Joseph Azar, in the 16th century. The Jews lived peacefully for over a thousand years in Anjuvannam. After the reign of the Rabban's, the Jewish people no longer had the protection of the copper plates. Neighboring princes of Anjuvannam intervened and revoked all privileges that the Jewish people were given. In 1524, the Jews were attacked by the Moors brothers (Muslim Community) on suspicion that they were tampering with the pepper trade and the homes and synagogues belonging to them were destroyed. The damage was so extensive that when the Portuguese arrived a few years later, only a small amount of impoverished Jews remained. They remained there for 40 more years only to return to their land of Cochin.

Today it also attracts tourists as a historic site. Cochin synagogue at Ernakulum operates partly as a shop by one of the few remaining Cochin Jews. It is recorded that currently only 26 Jews live in Kerala, located in different parts of Kerala such as Cochin, Kottayam and Thiruvalla. Dr. John Jacob was one of Kerala's most senior Jews, who lived in Kaviyoor village, Thiruvalla, Pathanamthitta District died on 25 May 2025. His body is buried at his Kaviyoor family church.

In Mala, Thrissur District, the Malabar Jews have a synagogue and a cemetery, as well as in Chennamangalam, Parur and Ernakulam. There are at least seven existing synagogues in Kerala, although not serving their original purpose anymore.

== Madras Jews ==
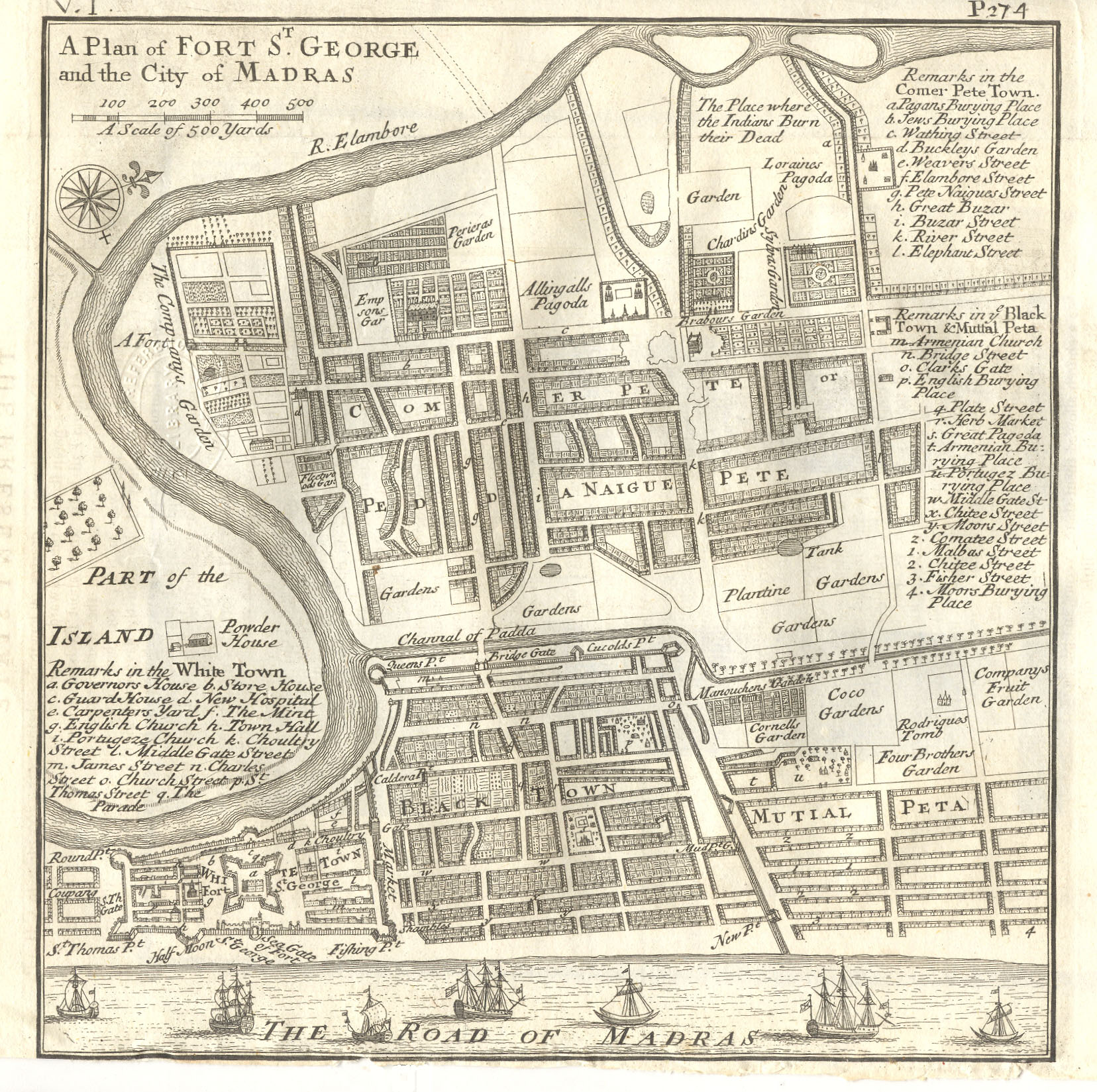
A plan of Fort St George and the city of Madras in 1726, shows the "Jews Burying Place" (marked as "b."), the "Jewish Cemetery Chennai", Four Brothers Garden and Bartolomeo Rodrigues Tomb

Jews also settled in Madras (now Chennai) soon after its founding in 1640. Most of them were coral merchants from Livorno, the Caribbean, London, and Amsterdam who were of Portuguese origin and belonged to the Henriques De Castro, Franco, Paiva or Porto families.

Jacques de Paiva, originally from the Amsterdam Sephardic community of Amsterdam, was an early Jewish arrival and the leader of the Madras Jewish community. He built the Madras Synagogue and Jewish Cemetery Chennai in Peddanaickenpet, which later became the south end of Mint Street.

De Paiva established good relations with those in power and bought several mines to source Golconda diamonds. Through his efforts, Jews were permitted to live within Fort St. George.

De Paiva died in 1687 after a visit to his mines and was buried in the Jewish cemetery he had established in Peddanaickenpet, which later became north Mint Street. (Note: A synagogue once also existed at Mint Street.) In 1670, the Portuguese population in Madras numbered around 3000. Before his death he established "The Colony of Jewish Traders of Madraspatam" with Antonio do Porto, Pedro Pereira and Fernando Mendes Henriques. This enabled more Portuguese Jews from Livorno, the Caribbean, London and Amsterdam, to settle in Madras. Coral Merchant Street was named after the Jews' business.

Three Portuguese Jews were nominated to be aldermen of the Madras Corporation. Three – Bartolomeo Rodrigues, Domingo do Porto and Alvaro da Fonseca – also founded the largest trading house in Madras. The large tomb of Rodrigues, who died in Madras in 1692, became a landmark in Peddanaickenpet, but was later destroyed.

Samuel de Castro came to Madras from Curaçao and Salomon Franco came from Leghorn.

In 1688, there were three Jewish representatives in the Madras Corporation. Most Jewish settlers resided in Coral Merchants Street in Muthialpet. They also had a cemetery, called Jewish Cemetery Chennai in the neighbouring Peddanaickenpet.

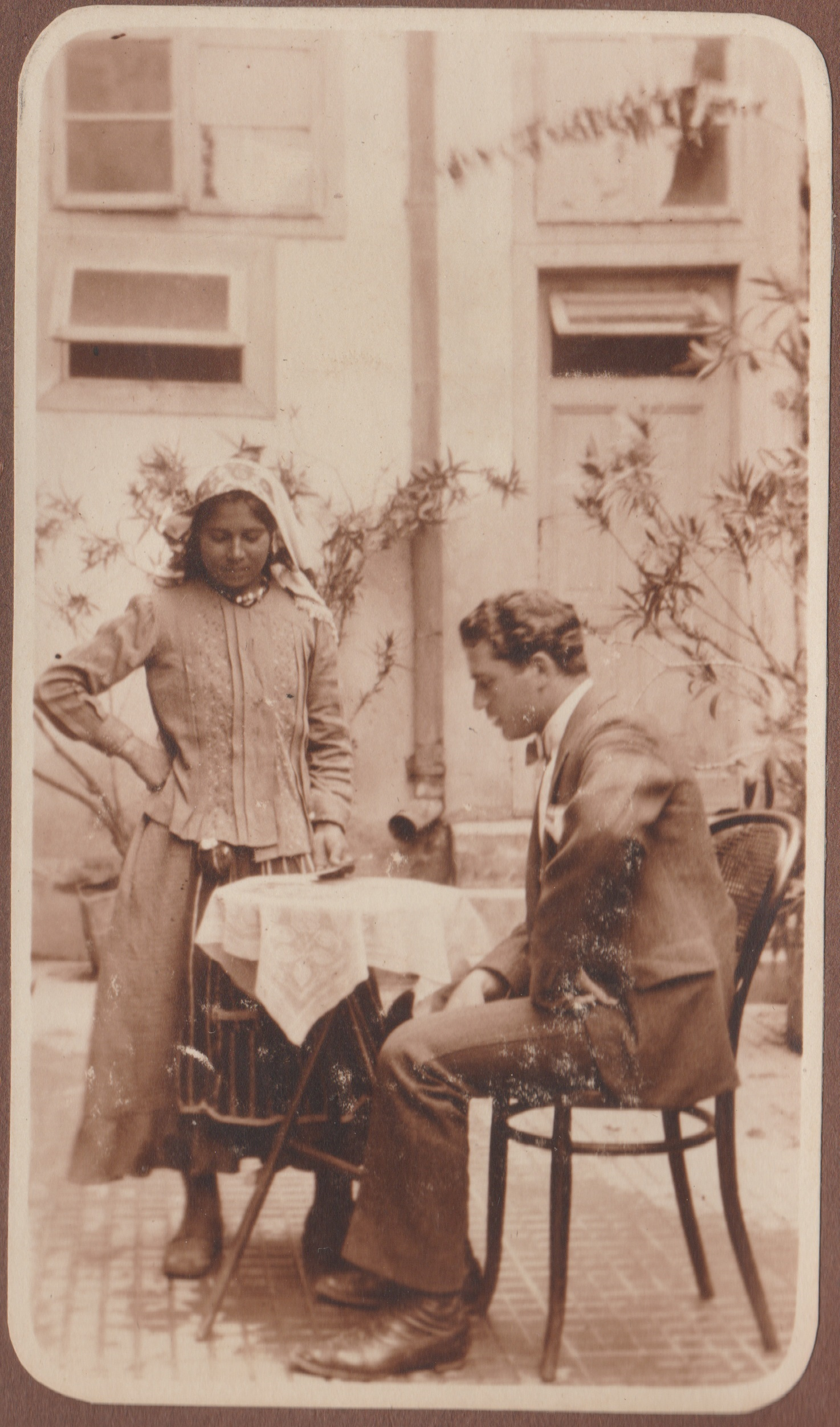
Rabbi Salomon Halevi (last Rabbi of Madras Synagogue) and his wife Rebecca Cohen, Paradesi Jews of Madras

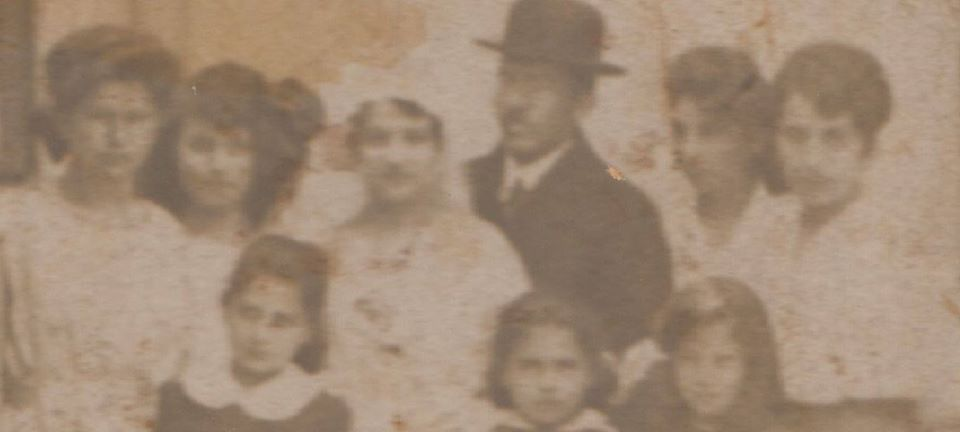
Mr. Cohen, his German wife, and children, Paradesi Jews of Madras

== Bene Israel ==
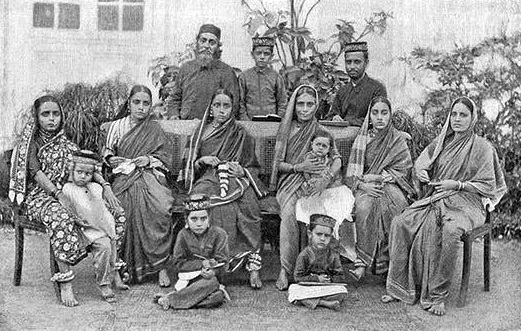
A photo of the Marathi Bene Israel family in Alibag, Bombay Presidency.

Foreign notices of the Bene Israel go back at least to 1768, when Rahabi Ezekiel wrote to a Dutch trading partner that they were widespread in Maharatta Province, and observed two Jewish observances, recital of the Shema and observation of Shabbat rest. They claim that they descend from 14 Jewish men and women, equally divided by gender, who survived the shipwreck of refugees from persecution or political turmoil, and came ashore at Navagaon near Alibag, 20 miles south of Mumbai, some 17 to 19 centuries ago.

They were instructed in the rudiments of normative Judaism by Cochin Jews. Their Jewishness is controversial, and initially was not accepted by the Rabbinate in Israel. Since 1964 however they intermarried throughout Israel and are now considered Israeli and Jewish in all respects.

They are divided into sub-castes that do not intermarry: the dark-skinned "Kala" and fair-skinned "Gora." The latter are believed to be lineal descendants of the shipwreck survivors, while the former are considered to descend from the concubinage of a male with local women. They were nicknamed the shanivār telī ("Saturday oil-pressers") by the local population as they abstained from work on Saturdays. Bene Israel communities and synagogues are situated in Pen, Mumbai, Panvel, Alibag, Pune, and Ahmedabad with smaller communities scattered around India. The largest synagogue in Asia outside Israel is in Pune, the Ohel David Synagogue.

Mumbai had a thriving Bene Israel community until the 1950s to 1960s, when many families from the community immigrated to Israel, where they are known as Hodi'im (Indians). The Bene Israel community has risen to many positions of prominence in Israel. In India, the Bene Israel community has shrunk considerably with many of the old synagogues in disuse.

Unlike many parts of the world, Jews have historically lived in India with relatively little anti-Semitism from the local majority populace, the Hindus. However, Jews were persecuted by the Portuguese during their control of Goa.

=== Mumbai ===
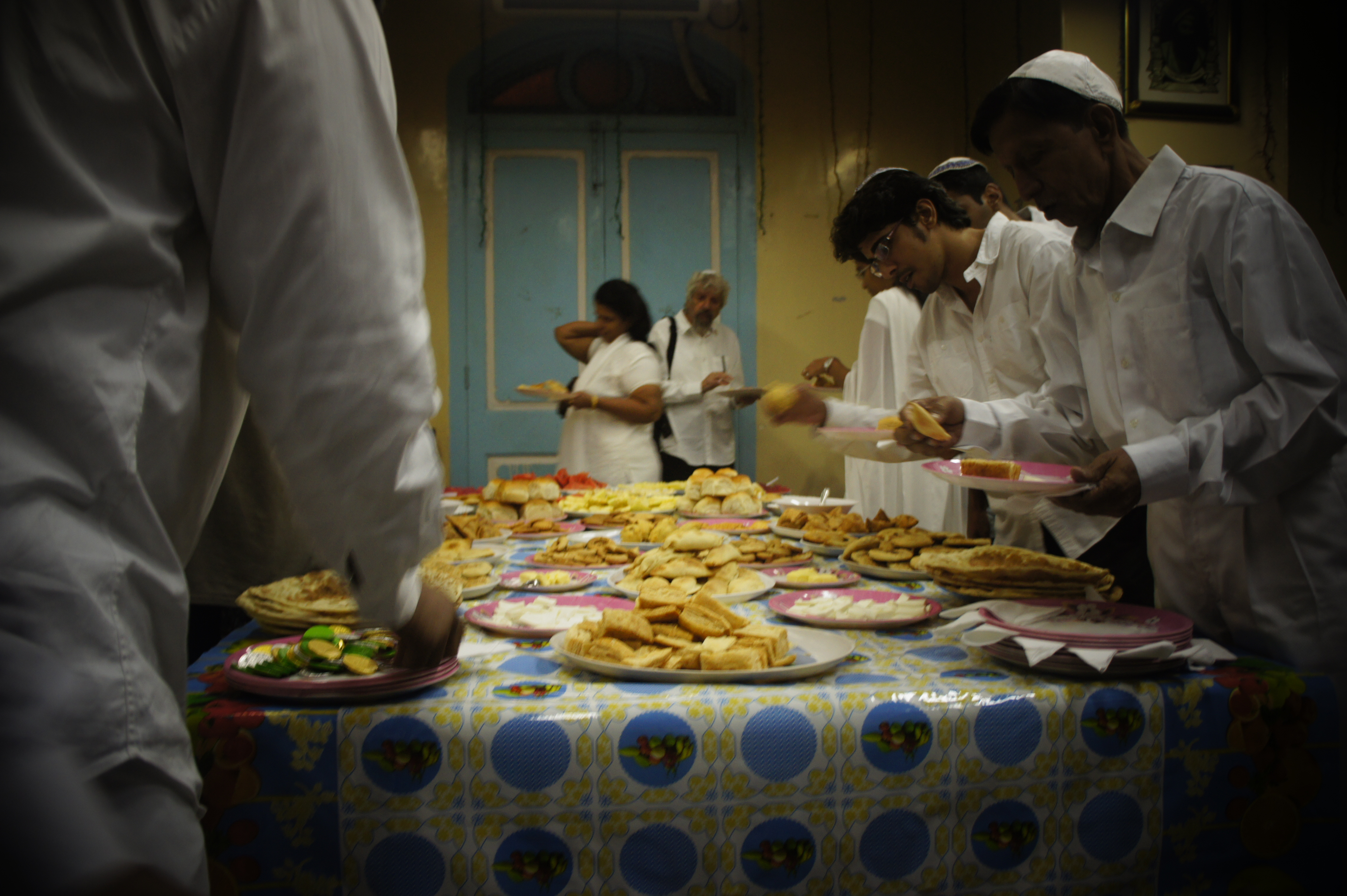
Jews in Mumbai break the Yom Kippur fast with roti and samosas

== Baghdadi Jews ==
The first known Baghdadi Jewish immigrant to India, Joseph Semah, arrived in the port city of Surat in 1730. He and other early immigrants established a synagogue and cemetery in Surat, though most of the city's Jewish community eventually moved to Bombay (Mumbai), where they established a new synagogue and cemetery. They were traders and quickly became one of the most prosperous communities in the city. As philanthropists, some donated their wealth for public building projects. The Sassoon Docks and David Sassoon Library are famous landmarks still standing today.

The synagogue in Surat was eventually razed; the cemetery, though in poor condition, can still be seen on the Katargam-Amroli road. One of the graves within is that of Moseh Tobi, buried in 1769, who was described as 'ha-Nasi ha-Zaken' (The Elder Prince) by David Solomon Sassoon in his book A History of the Jews in Baghdad (Simon Wallenburg Press, 2006, ISBN 184356002X).

Baghdadi Jewish populations spread beyond Bombay to other parts of India, with an important community forming in Calcutta (Kolkata). Scions of this community did well in trade (particularly jute and tea), and in later years contributed officers to the army. One, Lt-Gen J. F. R. Jacob PVSM, became state governor of Goa (1998–1999), then Punjab, and later served as administrator of Chandigarh. Pramila (Esther Victoria Abraham) became the first ever Miss India, in 1947.

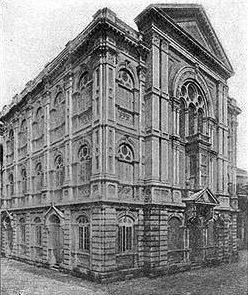
Knesset Eliyahoo, a 150-year-old Jewish synagogue in Fort, Mumbai, India

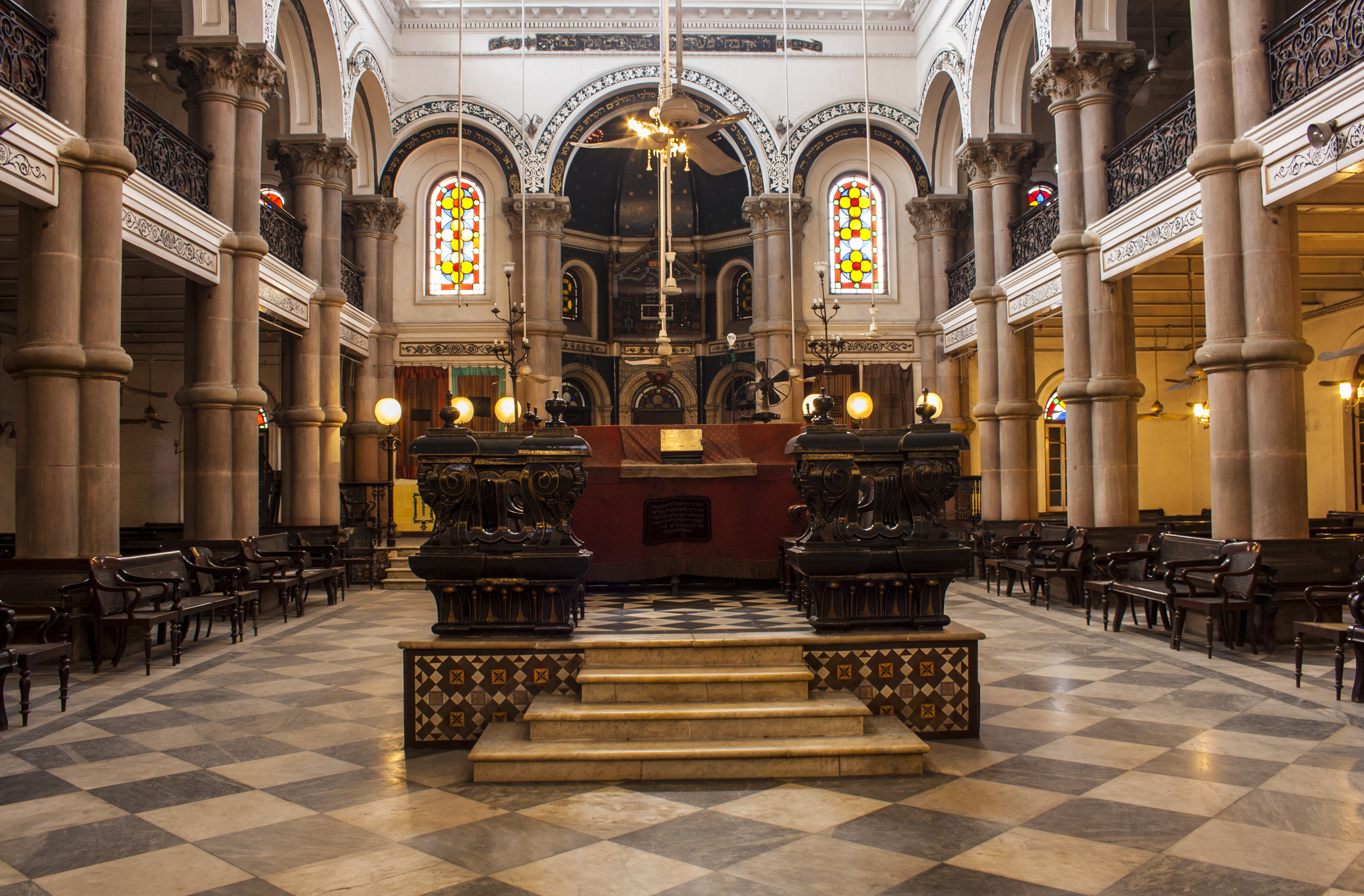
The Magen David Synagogue of Kolkata was built in 1884

== Bnei Menashe ==
Flag of Bnei Menashe

The Bnei Menashe are a group of more than 9,000 people from the northeastern Indian states of Mizoram and Manipur who practice a form of biblical Judaism and claim descent from one of the Lost Tribes of Israel, the tribe of Menasseh. About 7,000 of the Bnei Menashe immigrated to Israel in 2011.

== Bene Ephraim ==
The Bene Ephraim are a small group of Telugu-speaking Jews in eastern Andhra Pradesh whose recorded observance of Judaism, like that of the Bnei Menashe, is quite recent, dating only to 1991.

There are a few families in Andhra Pradesh who follow Judaism. Many among them follow the customs of Orthodox Jews, like wearing long beards and using head coverings (men) and hair coverings (women) all the time.

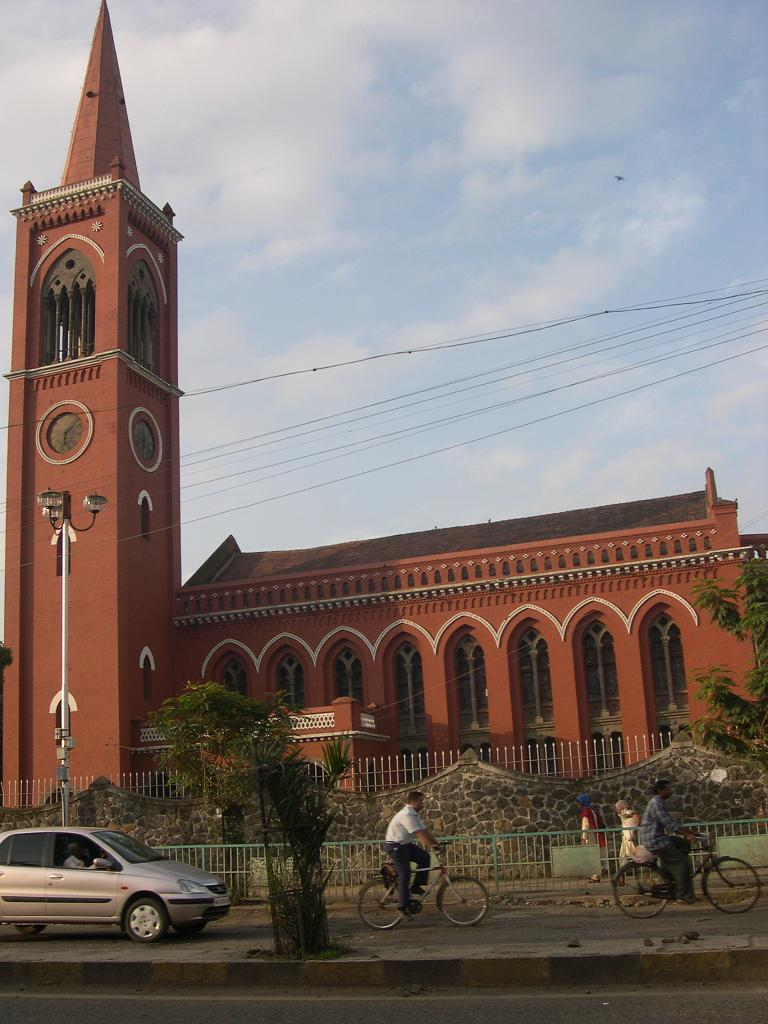
Ohel David Synagogue of Pune is the largest active synagogue in India

== Holocaust refugees ==
Between 1938 and 1947, roughly 200 Jews illegally migrated from Europe to India to escape persecution by the Nazi regime. Most of these refugees arrived in India at the start of World War II and consequently were better positioned to find employment and shelter than many European Jews who were forced to leave amid war. Jewish refugees in British India were able to secure jobs in the arts and the service industry while a disproportionately large percentage of the migrants found employment in the medical field. Alongside the adoption of various Indian societal practices and customs, these jobs helped Jewish immigrants create a sense of their unique cultural place and identity as Jews within British India.

Immigration policy within the British Empire in the late 1930s and early 1940s often complicated Jewish entry into British India. One requirement of wartime migrants entering British India was for their passports to be "valid for return," where British officials could repatriate refugees if they were deemed burdensome. The annexation of Austria in 1938 saw the replacement of Austrian passports with German documents, meaning that Austrian Jews attempting to flee with Austrian passports no longer met British immigration requirements. Still, Jewish aid organizations in India (most prominently the Council for German Jewry and the Jewish Relief Association) helped to form policies that benefited Jewish immigrants and regulated how Jews were resettled in India.

Since most Jewish refugees spoke German and originated from Germany or its neighboring countries, British officials and Indian locals often found the migrants indistinguishable from their non-Jewish counterparts. By 1940, many Jewish refugees were suspected of being Nazi sympathizers or agents passing as Jewish.

== Today ==
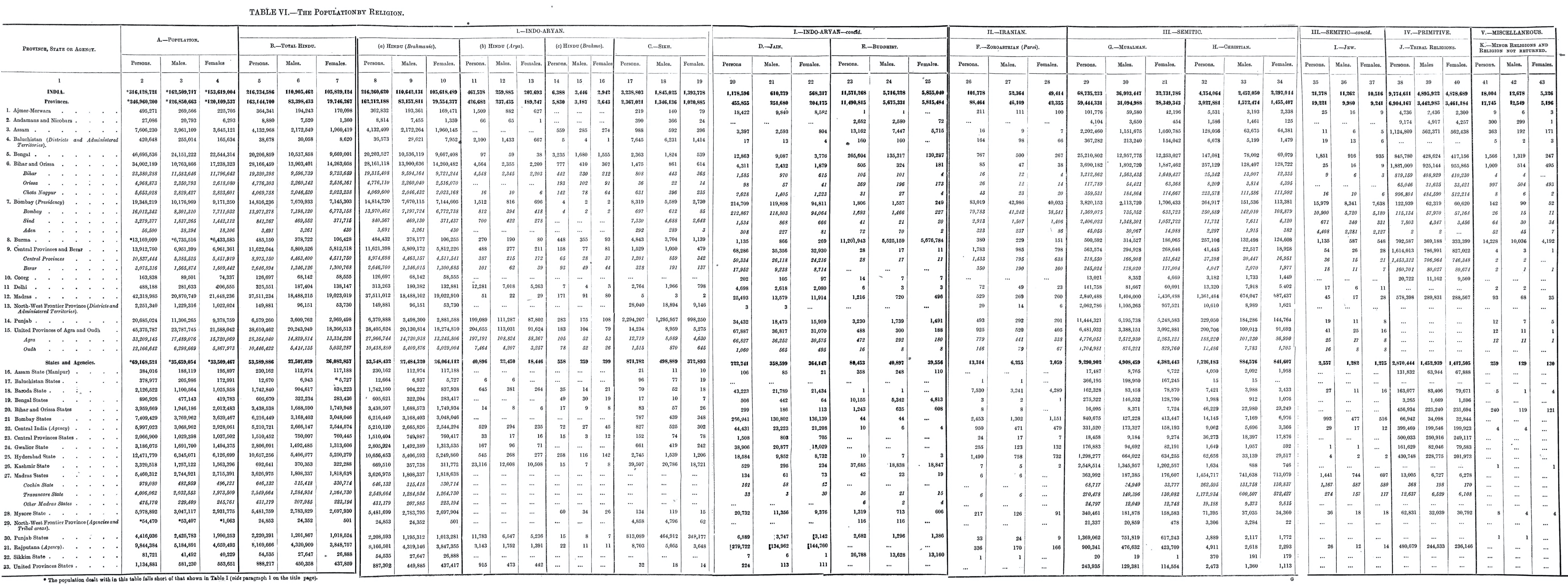
The 1921 Census of British India shows 22,000 Jews, of which approximately three quarters were located in the Bombay Presidency.

The majority of Indian Jews have "made Aliyah" (migrated) to Israel since the creation of the modern state in 1948. Over 70,000 Indian Jews now live in Israel (over 1% of Israel's total population). Of the remaining 5,000, the largest community is concentrated in Mumbai, where 3,500 have remained from the 30,000 Jews registered there in the 1940s, divided into B'nei and Baghdadi Jews, though the Baghdadi Jews refused to recognize the B'nei Israel as Jews, and withheld dispensing charity to them for that reason.

Historical population of Indian Jews in Israel (Note: A child is considered Indian Jewish if their mother is from an Indian Jewish background.)
Year	Pop.	±% p.a.
1911	0	—
1921	52	—
1931	161	+11.96%
1941	478	+11.50%
1951	3,965	+23.56%
1961	17,856	+16.24%
1971	39,487	+8.26%
1981	54,792	+3.33%
1991	60,128	+0.93%
2001	65,432	+0.85%
2011	68,219	+0.42%
2021	69,874	+0.24%

There are reminders of Jewish localities in Kerala still left such as synagogues. The majority of Jews from the old British-Indian capital of Calcutta (Kolkata) have also migrated to Israel over the last six decades.

== Notable people of Jewish Indian descent ==
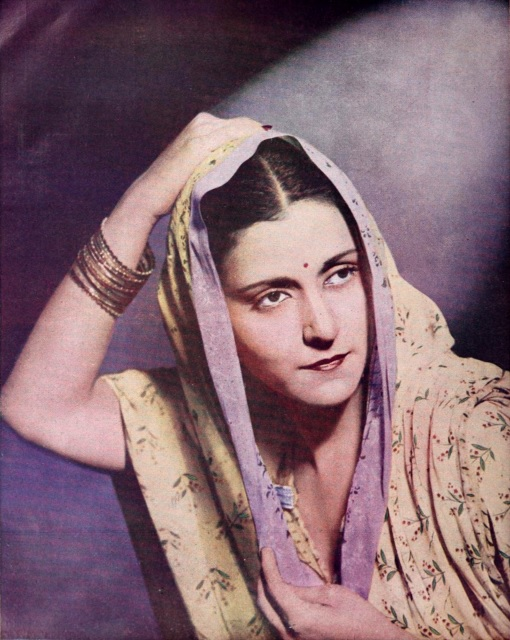
Sulochana, actress

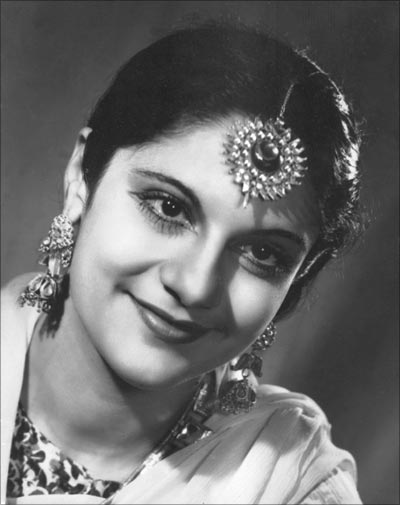
Pramila, actress and former Miss India

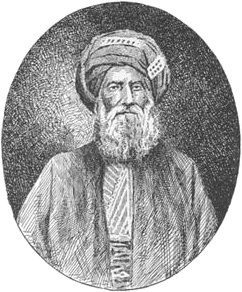
David Sassoon, businessman

- Esther Victoria Abraham, also known as Pramila, first Miss India
- Firoza Begum, Indian actress born as 'Erin Daniels'
- Eli Ben-Menachem (b. 1947), Israeli politician
- Jacqueline Bhabha (b. 1951), lecturer at Harvard Law School and Harvard Kennedy School of Government
- Ranjit Chaudhry (1955–2020), Bollywood actor
- David Abraham Cheulkar (1908–1982), Bollywood actor
- Lila Irene Clerides, First Lady of Cyprus (1993–2003) and wife of Glafcos Clerides, president of the Republic of Cyprus
- Ruby Daniel, Israeli author of Cochin Jewish origin
- Esther David (b. 1945), Jewish-Indian author, an artist and a sculptor
- Karen David (b. 1979), British-Canadian actress
- Reuben David (1912–1989) zoologist
- Fleur Ezekiel – Bene Israel model, chosen as Miss India World in 1959
- Nissim Ezekiel, poet, playwright, editor and art-critic
- J F R Jacob, former Chief of Staff of the Indian Army's Eastern Command, and former Governor of Punjab and Goa
- Gerry Judah, artist and designer
- Ellis Kadoorie, philanthropist
- Elly Kadoorie, philanthropists
- Horace Kadoorie, philanthropist
- Anish Kapoor, artist
- Aditya Roy Kapur (b. 1985), Indian actor
- Isaac David Kehimkar (b. 1957), lepidopterist, butterfly expert based in Navi Mumbai.
- Samson Kehimkar, musician
- Lillian, Indian film actress
- Ezekiel Isaac Malekar, Bene Israel rabbi
- Ruby Myers, Bollywood actress of the 1920s known as Sulochana
- Nadira (1932–2006), Bollywood actress
- Madhura Naik, actress
- Pearl Padamsee, theatre personality
- Sheila Singh Paul, paediatrician, founder and director of Kalawati Saran Children's Hospital, New Delhi; pioneer in polio vaccination
- Joseph Rabban, the first Israeli king of Shingly was given copper plates of special grants from the Chera ruler Bhaskara Ravivarman II from Kerala
- Ezekiel Rahabi (1694–1771), chief Jewish merchant of the Dutch East India Company in Cochin (Kochi) for almost 50 years
- David and Simon Reuben, businessmen
- Lalchanhima Sailo, rabbi and founder of Chhinlung Israel People's Convention
- Abraham Barak Salem (1882–1967), Cochin Jewish Indian nationalist leader
- Vice Admiral Benjamin Abraham Samson, Indian Navy Admiral, former Flag Officer Commanding Indian Fleet
- Leela Samson, dancer, choreographer, and actress
- Albert Abdullah David Sassoon, British Indian merchant
- David Sassoon, businessman
- Sassoon David Sassoon, philanthropist and benefactor of the greater Indian Jewish community
- Jael Silliman, Baghdadi Indian Jewish author based in Kolkata
- Bensiyon Songavkar, Indian cricket, silver medalist at the 2009 Maccabiah Games
- Solomon Sopher, Jewish community leader in Mumbai
- Samuel Fyzee-Rahamin, notable artist

== See also ==
- Bene Ephraim
- Bnei Menashe
- Christianity in India
- Cochin Jews
- Desi Jews
- Jewish Cemetery, Chinchpokli
- Jewish cemetery, Kolkata
- History of the Jews in Afghanistan
- History of the Jews in Pakistan
- History of the Jews in Sri Lanka
- History of the Jews in Tajikistan
- Meshuchrarim
- Paradesi Jews
- Sephardic Jews in India
