= Nautanki Saala and Other Stories =

2022 short story collection by Mohua Chinappa

Nautanki Saala And Other Stories
- Cover of the book
- Author: Mohua Chinappa
- Language: English
- Genre: Short story
- Publisher: OakBridge Publishing
- Publication date: 2022
- Publication place: India
- Media type: Print (Paperback)
- ISBN: 978-93-91032-73-9

Nautanki Saala And Other Stories is a short story collection by writer Mohua Chinappa. The book was published in 2022 by OakBridge Publishing.

The collection has 15 short stories. The book was launched by Shatrughan Sinha, a Member of Parliament and veteran actor and columnist Bharathi Pradhan in Bangalore, India. It took a year for the writer to write the book. Excerpt from the book was published in various news publications and magazines, including Deccan Chronicle, Governance Now,Outlook India, SheThePeople and Rediff.com.

== Synopsis ==
The book is a collection of short stories based on the women and men whom the writer met in a span of two decades, from the early 1980s to the 2000s. The book covers the real-life stories of women from diverse backgrounds. It portrays the story of a tribal Khasi woman who runs a tea stall to a journalist from Northeast India, trying to blend into the big city. The protagonists in the book are individuals who encountered loss, displacement and grief. It also offers a testament to economic and cultural shifts that have occurred since the 1980s.

One of the stories titled, Does Your Cat Speak To You? depicts how Hindu refugees' suffered in the Bangladesh Liberation War. The story concludes with the fact that during the 1971 Bangladesh Liberation War, around 20 to 40 Lakh Bengali women were reported to have been victimized by rape. The author draws attention through the main character Paromita to many women who seem to have survived those turbulent times.

== Reception ==
The collection generally received favourable reviews. Reviewing the book, Jael Silliman writes, "Her [Writer's] direct, uncluttered style delves into the emotional minefield of each of her protagonists, enabling us to enter their inner worlds to grasp their particular predicaments." Silliman calls it "an unputdownable book".

Askari Jaffer, who writes on art and literature for the English daily The Hans India, called the book, "an attempt to strengthen the feminist who hesitates in confiding."

In its review, Frontlist magazine says, "Mohua's writing style is sharp and lucid, which makes it intriguing for the readers". Shatrughan Sinha commented on the book, "the book is a gamut of emotions. As you flip the pages, you travel with the characters on their life journey. It is enigmatic, engrossing & beautifully written."
