= Desi Jews =

Jews of South Asia

Desi Jews are Jews living in South Asia (or originally from this region, also known as the Indian subcontinent) who belong to communities that had been integrated into South Asian culture and society.

The term Desi, found in most South Asian languages, is used by the South Asians to refer to themselves. It means "one of us, of our land", alluding to a common culture (the opposite is Paradesi or Videshi aka non-Desi, "foreigner", see Paradesi Jews). After the 1947 partition, the term is also employed when it is intended to avoid any allusion to the specific state of origin, also when the topic involves all the Indian subcontinent. Many outsiders also tend to use the word "Indian" for South Asian people and culture. This might be considered offensive by non-Indian Desi (the state of India is just a part of the Indian subcontinent).

Unlike other areas of the world, the Jewish communities were accepted and integrated in the local society of the Indian subcontinent. Also, similar to the Parsis, and other (originally) foreign communities, the preservation of group identity was facilitated by the caste system. In Desi society, a person's allegiance to a group, part of its fabric, is presumed and respected.

The Desi Jewish communities are some of the oldest in world, with more than 2000 years of continuity in the Indian subcontinent (such as the Cochin Jews and the Bene Israel). Most of them lived on the coast of the Arabian Sea. They were involved in trade in the Malabar area, also in the production of oil. A turning point was the arrival of the Portuguese in the 16th century. They introduced the Inquisition on the west coast of the Indian subcontinent, persecuting the Jewish and Christian communities. The arrival of the Europeans facilitated the immigration of Jews with Sephardi and Mizrahi backgrounds. In the times of the British Raj, the arrival of the Sephardim and Mizrahim who were to be considered "Europeans" by the British authority, hence their name of Paradesi Jews ("White Jews") created some friction with the shunned older Desi communities.

After the mid-20th century, when the Indian subcontinent was partitioned and Israel was created, most Desi Jews immigrated mainly to Israel.

== Relations with Hindu society ==
The history of Cochin Jews provides a documented example of a Jewish minority maintaining religion while participating in the social and cultural life of a predominantly Hindu society.

== See also ==
- Baghdadi Jews
- Bene Ephraim
- Bene Israel
- Bnei Menashe
- Cochin Jews
- History of the Jews in Bangladesh
- History of the Jews in India
- History of the Jews in Pakistan
- History of the Jews in Sri Lanka
- Judeo-Malayalam
- Judæo-Marathi
- Knanaya
