= Reuben David =

Indian zoologist (1912–1989)

Reuben David (19 September 1912 – 24 March 1989) was a zoologist and the founder of the Kankaria Zoo in Ahmedabad, Gujarat, India.

== Biography ==
He was born into a Bene Israel Jewish family in Ahmedabad. He was the youngest son of Joseph David. He was a self-taught veterinarian. He was invited by the Ahmedabad Municipal Corporation in 1951 to create a zoo in the city. He also founded the Kankaria Zoo (now Kamala Nehru Zoological Garden), the Chacha Nehru Balvatika (Children's Park) and the Natural History Museum, later named after him. He had lost his speech due to cancer. He also served as an advisor for Sundervan in Ahmedabad and Indroda Park in Gandhinagar.

He co-authored The Asiatic Lion (1991) with M. A. Rashid who was a retired chief conservator of forests under Government of Gujarat.

He was the Fellow of the Zoological Society (FZS). He was honoured with the Padma Shri by the Government of India in 1975.

Australian anthropologist Colin Groves discovered the prehistoric warthog in 1981 and named the Central Asian boar after him, Sus scrofa davidi.

== Personal life ==
Author Esther David is his daughter.
