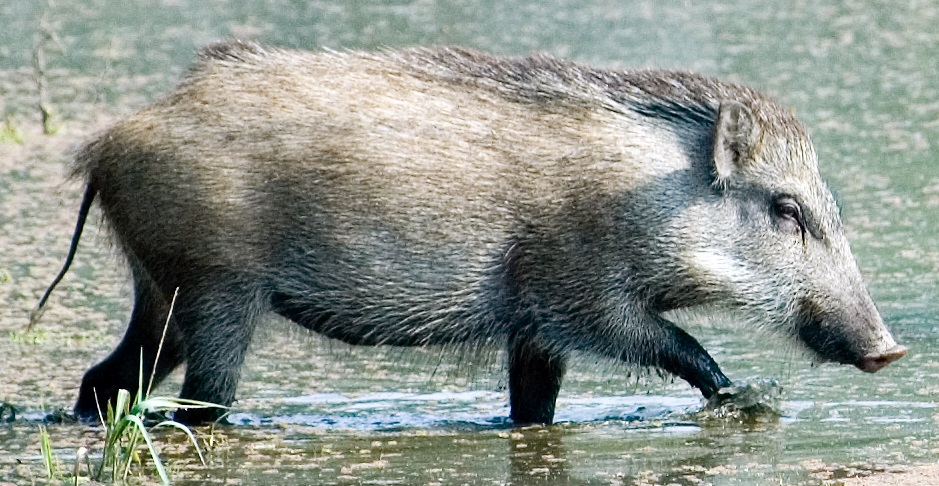

Scientific classification
- Kingdom: Animalia
- Phylum: Chordata
- Class: Mammalia
- Order: Artiodactyla
- Family: Suidae
- Genus: Sus
- Species: S. scrofa
- Subspecies: S. s. davidi

Trinomial name
- Sus scrofa davidi Groves, 1981

= Central Asian boar =

The Central Asian boar (Sus scrofa davidi) is a small long maned subspecies of wild boar indigenous to Southeastern Iran, Pakistan and Northwest India.

== Description ==
The subspecies is smaller than the nominate S. s. scrofa. It is light brown in color and has a long and thick mane. Males have been reported to reach weights of up to 158 kg, and females 123 kg.

Australian anthropologist Colin Groves named it after Reuben David, an Indian zoologist.
