= Book of Rachel =

Book by Esther David

- First edition
- Author: Esther David
- Language: English
- Genre: fiction
- Published: 2007
- Publisher: Penguin India
- Publication place: India
- Media type: Hardcover
- Pages: 280
- ISBN: 978-0143444534

Book of Rachel is a novel by the Indian-Jewish author Esther David. The book won India's Sahitya Akademi Award in the year 2010.

== Plot ==
The main protagonist of the novel is an old Jewish widow named Rachel from Bene Israel community who tries to preserve Jewish culinary art and simultaneously tries to protect a local synagogue from local land mafia.

== Reception ==
In her review, Geeta Doctor wrote for India Today "To most people it would consist one portion of R. K. Narayan [and] a dash of sentimentality from Tagore's Kabuliwallah."

Deeptha Achar, Professor at the Department of English, Faculty of Arts, Maharaja Sayajirao University of Baroda wrote "...the book is more ambitious. It not only portrays the community [Bene Israel] from within but also examines the pushes and pulls, economic, cultural, which impinge upon it."

== Awards ==
- Sahitya Akademi Award 2010
