= Esther David =

Indian Jewish author, artist and sculptor

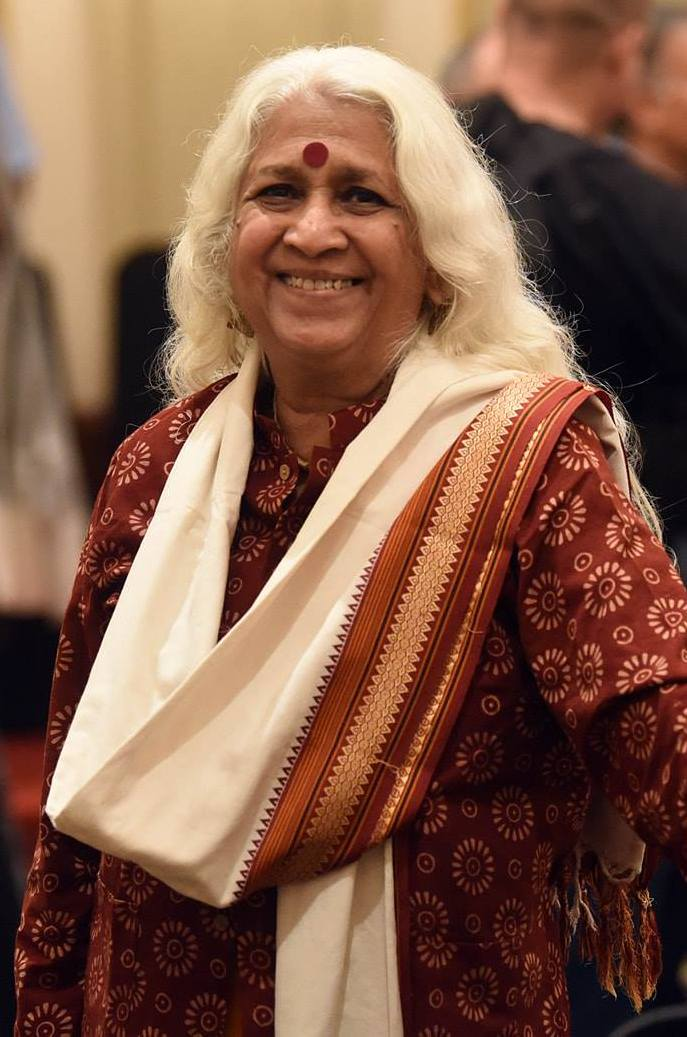
- Born: 17 March 1945 (age 81); Ahmedabad, Gujarat, India
- Education: Maharaja Sayajirao University of Baroda
- Occupations: Author, artist, sculptor
- Writing career
- Genres: Fiction, anthropology
- Notable work: Book of Rachel
- Notable awards: Sahitya Akademi Award 2010
- Website: estherdavid.com

Esther David (born 17 March 1945) is an Indian Jewish author, an artist and a sculptor. She is a recipient of the Sahitya Akademi Award.

== Early life ==
She was born into a Bene Israel Jewish family in Ahmedabad, Gujarat. She won Sahitya Akademi Award in 2010 for The Book of Rachel.

Her father, Reuben David, was a hunter-turned-veterinarian, who founded the Kamala Nehru Zoological Garden and the Balvatika near Kankaria lake in Ahmedabad. Her mother, Sarah, was a school teacher.

After her schooling in Ahmedabad, She was at Maharaja Sayajirao University of Baroda, as a student of Fine Arts and Art History. There she met Sankho Chaudhary, a sculptor, who taught her sculpture and Art History. After her graduation she returned to Ahmedabad and started her career as a professor in art history and art appreciation. She taught at the Sheth Chimanlal Nagindas Fine Arts College, CEPT University and NIFT.

She started writing about art and became the Times of India art critic, a national English daily. Later she became a columnist for Femina, a women's magazine, the "Times of India" and other leading national dallies. She is an advisory editor of Eve Times, Ahmedabad. She has authored several books; and also been an editor and contributor. Her books are related to Bene Israel Jews in Ahmedabad.

The Hadassah-Brandeis Institute (HBI) featured Shalom India Housing Society in the Hasassah-Brandeis 2010–2011 calendar, which highlights 12 Jewish women authors across the world whose "writing illuminates a particular city". The title of the calendar was Jewish Women Writers and the Cities that Influence Them.

== Bibliography ==
- Ahmedabad: City with a Past. HarperCollins Publishers India. 10 February 2016. ISBN 978-93-5029-798-8.
- The Walled City 1997 East West Books, Madras. Re-published by Syracuse University Press USA.
- By the Sabarmati
- The Book of Esther
- Book of Rachel
- My Father’s Zoo 2007
- Shalom India Housing Society 2007
- One Church, One All Jewish Faith, One God 2008 Media Creations, Inc.
- The Man with Enormous Wings 2010 Penguin Books
- Bombay Brides 2019, Harpercollins

Contributor

- Sari Sutra, contributed a chapter on Bene Israeli Jewish costumes.
- City Stories "The Worry Box and The Laughing Lady" Scholastic India.
- Growing Up as a Woman Writer "Nanki Chirai" Sahitya Academy New Delhi.
- Gattu's Wildlife Adventures

Editor

- Ane Dhara Dhruji

== Awards and recognition ==
- Writer in Residence at Villa Mont Noir, France in 1999–2000.
- Writer in Residence, Maison des Écrivains Étrangers et des Traducteurs, Saint-Nazaire, France in 2001–2002.
- Sahitya Akademi Award 2010 for The Book of Rachel.
- Hadassah-Brandeis Institute (HBI) Research Award 2011 for "I am the seed of the Tree…," A Jewish woman’s search of her Jewish heritage in India.
- Hadassah-Brandeis Institute (HBI) Research Award 2016 for Bene-Appetite (Research on Indian Jewish Food Traditions).

== See also ==
- List of Indian writers
