= Sephardic Jews in India =

Regions with significant populations
- India India: Chennai, and the Eastern, South-Eastern Coast Israel

Languages
- Initially Ladino, later Judeo-Malayalam, now mostly Hebrew & English

Religion
- Orthodox Judaism

Related ethnic groups
- Chennai Jews; Cochin Jews; Sephardic Jews; Paradesi Jews

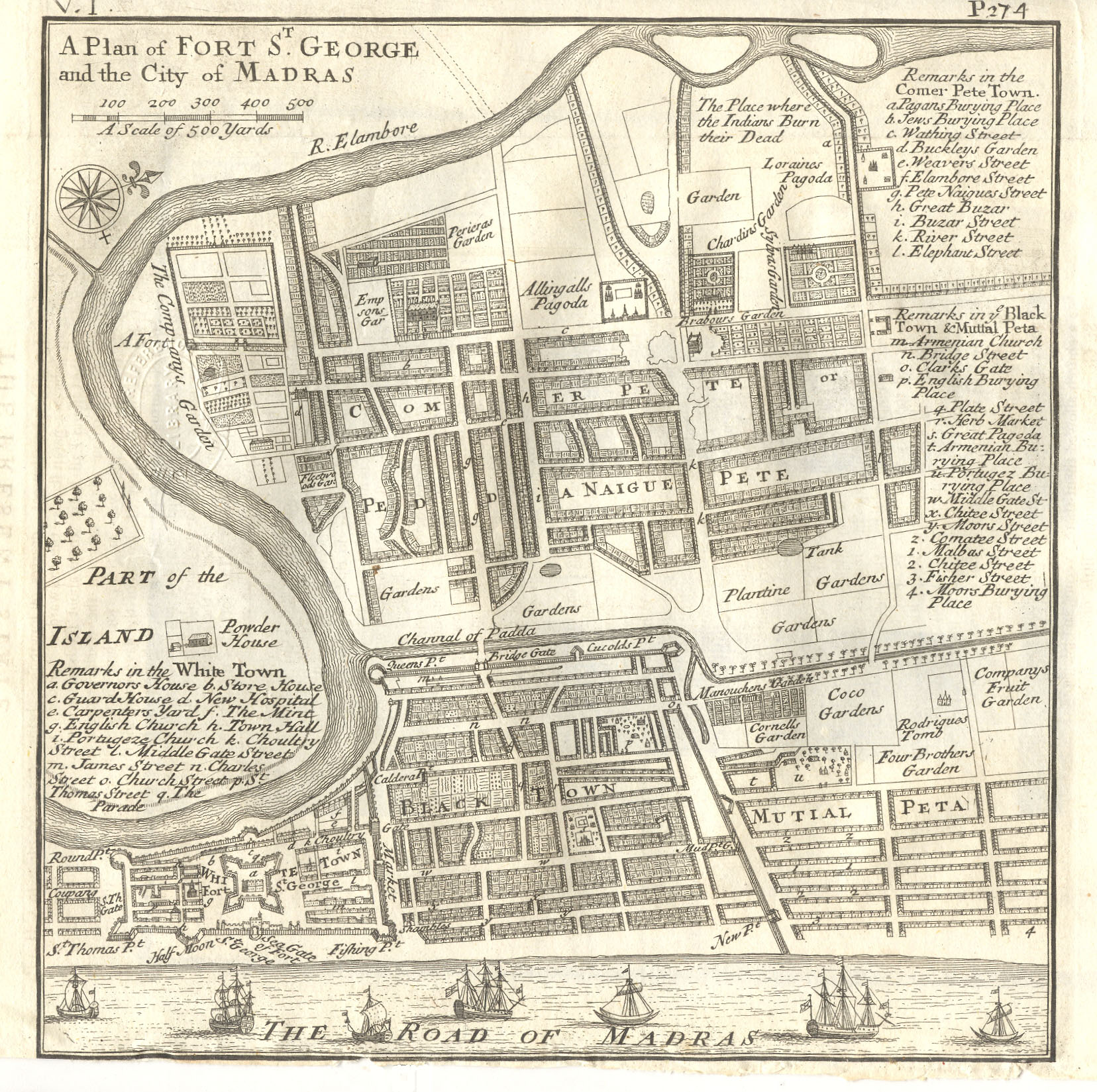
Plan of Fort St George and the city of Madras in 1726, Shows b.Jews Burying Place Jewish Cemetery Chennai, Four Brothers Garden and Bartolomeo Rodrigues Tomb

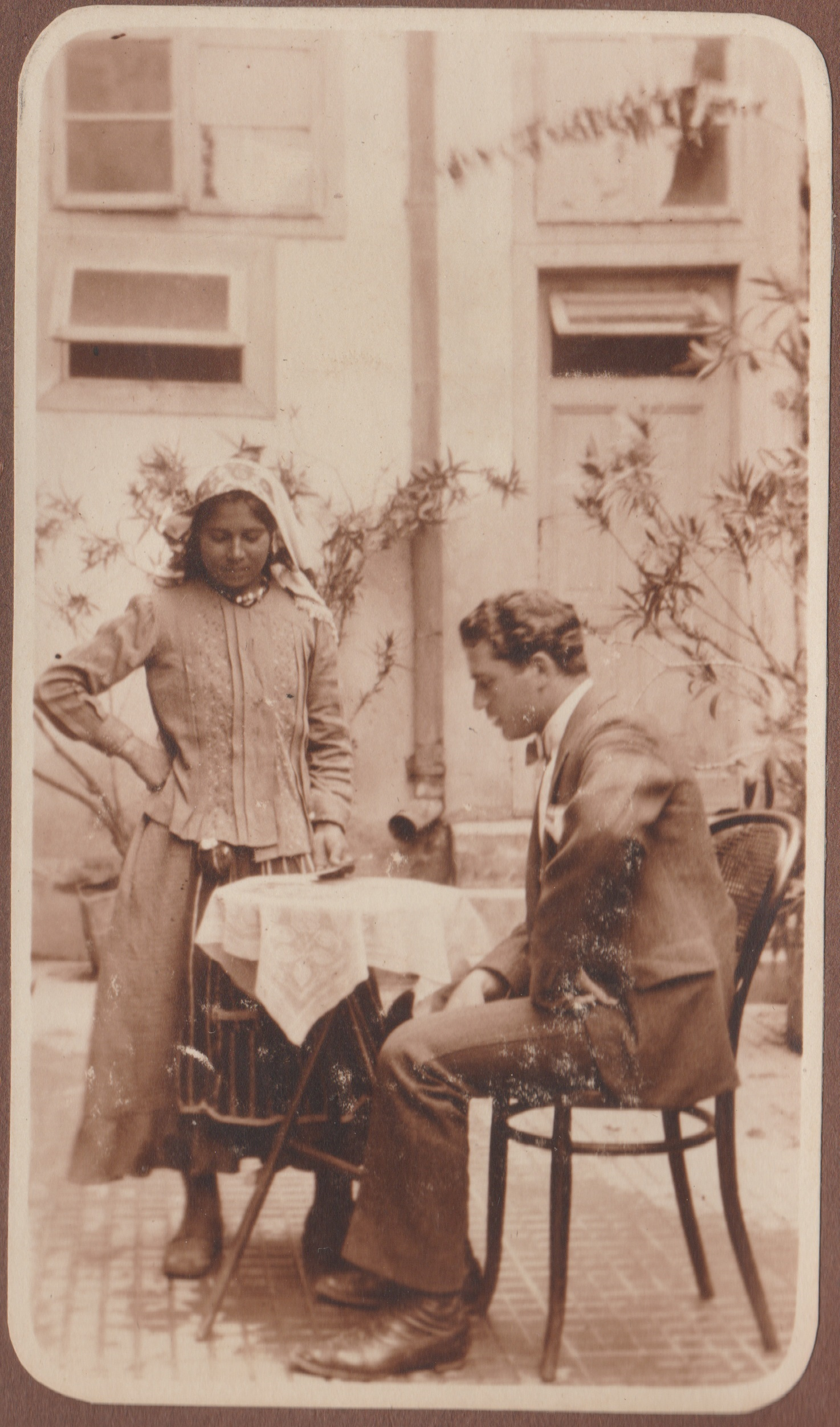
Rabbi Salomon Halevi, the last Rabbi of Madras Synagogue and his wife Rebecca Cohen, among the Paradesi Jews who settled in Madras.

Sephardic Jews in India are Iberian Jews who settled in many coastal towns of India, in Goa and Damaon, Madras (now Chennai) and, primarily and for the longest period, on the Malabar coast in Cochin. After the Portuguese discovery of the sea route to India in the 1498, a number of Sephardic Jews fled Antisemitism in Iberia which had culminated in the Edict of Expulsion in 1492 and Persecution of Jews and Muslims by Manuel I of Portugal. They settled in Portuguese Indian trading places so that they could continue practicing Judaism secretly while still remaining within the Portuguese Empire. After the Portuguese Inquisition was established, an additional number of falsely-converted Sephardic Jews (known as New Christians and Conversos) made sea voyages to settle in India, because it would then be difficult for the Inquisition to investigate and punish them. They spoke the vernacular language of their kingdom (basically Castilian i.e. Spanish-Portuguese or Catalan) and some of them also Arabic.

In his lecture at the Library of Congress, Professor Sanjay Subrahmanyam, Chair in Social Sciences at University of California, Los Angeles, explains that crypto-Jews were especially attracted to India because not only was it a center of trade, but India had established and ancient Jewish settlements along its Western coast. The presence of these communities meant that crypto-Jews, who had been forced to accept Catholicism but did not want to emigrate to tolerant countries, could operate within the Portuguese Empire with the full freedom of Catholic subjects but away from the Inquisition while collaborating with existing Jewish communities to hide their true beliefs.

In "The Marrano Factory: The Portuguese Inquisition, and its New Christians 1536-1765" Professor Antonio Saraiva of the University of Lisbon in Portugal dedicates a section to the situation of crypto-Jews (New Christians) in Goa. He concludes that once the Portuguese Inquisition began, Goa, along with Italy, the Ottoman Empire, the Netherlands, and North Africa initially received most of the fleeing Jewish population (regardless of whether they had converted or not), and this situation continued till the middle of the 1500s. Goa was a popular destination till 1560 (when the Goan Inquisiton was initiated).

A notable Jewish population once existed in the Portuguese India colony of Bassein. These Jews were of the Bene Israel community who had arrived in India centuries earlier. They had their own synagogues and enjoyed freedom. When the Portuguese took control over Goa, crypto-Jews from Portugal flooded in large numbers. The strong presence of crypto-Jews in this region was the primary justification for the Portuguese to institute the Goa Inquisition in 1560 – this was 24 years after the Portuguese Inquisition was instituted in Portugal. Indeed, as the Professor Saraiva also explains, in "The Marrano Factory", the Conversos of Goa were able to achieve such quick, and remarkable prominence that the Portuguese King, on the advice of the Christian clergy, enacted a law disallowing New Christians from holding positions of high authority. Had New Christians not been able to achieve prominence, such a law would not have been necessary. The famed Sephardic physician Garcia de Orta belonged to this community.

In Kerala they learned Judeo-Malayalam, the dialect developed by the Malabar Jews, descendants of immigrants who had been there for more than 1,000 years from Israel and Yemen. The combined groups in Kerala became known as the Cochin Jews. The European Jews were also referred to as the Paradesi Jews (associated with foreigners) or White Jews, given their European ethnicity. The Malabar Jews, having intermarried in south India, had darker skin.

In addition, some settled in Madras, now known as Chennai Jews, they worked with the English East India Company in Fort St. George. According to the famed Sephardic poet Daniel Levy de Barrios, during his lifetime Madras was one of the six main areas of Sephardic Jewish settlement in the English empire. By the late 18th century, they had mostly shifted their trading companies to London, and the Jewish community in Madras declined.

The Portuguese extended the Inquisition to their Indian possessions in 1560. The presence of crypto-Jews of India, along with their support of the crypto-Muslim arrivals from Iberia alarmed the Portuguese Catholic leadership in India. The Goa Inquisition was instituted by John III of Portugal. More than 16,000 people were put on trial between 1560-1774. In the first 30 years of the Inquisition 321 people were brought to trial on the charge of crypto-Judaism. The main targets of the Inquisition were Crypto-Jews, who remained in Portuguese territory while being forced to profess Catholicism and practicing Judaism secretly, instead of emigrating to countries where Judaism was accepted (e.g. Ottoman Empire, Poland, etc.). Many Jews from Portuguese Goa fled to Bombay, and Portuguese Cochin in Kerala where they joined the Malabar Yehudan. The start of Dutch rule in 1663 eased the pressure on the Jewish community in the Malabar region.
