= Bene Ephraim =

Jewish community in Andhra Pradesh, India

Bnei Ephraim
Total population
- 350

Regions with significant populations
- Andhra Pradesh, India

Languages
- Telugu, Hebrew

Religion
- Judaism

Related ethnic groups
- Other Indian Jews and Telugu

The Bene Ephraim (Hebrew: בני אפריים) Bnei Ephraim ("Sons of Ephraim"), also called Telugu Jews because they speak Telugu, are a small community living primarily in Kotha Reddy Palem, a village outside Chebrolu, Guntur district, and in Machilipatnam, Krishna District, Andhra Pradesh, India, near the delta of the River Krishna. They claim to be descendants of the Tribe of Ephraim, of the Ten Lost Tribes, and since the 1980s have learned to practice modern Judaism.

== History ==
The Bene Ephraim claim descent from the Tribe of Ephraim, and say that they traveled from Israel through western Asia: Persia, Afghanistan, Tibet and into China for 1,600 years before arriving in southern India more than 1,000 years ago. They hold a history which they say is similar to that of the shift of Afghan Jews and Persian Jews, Bene Israel, Bnei Menashe in the northeastern Indian states of Mizoram and Manipur, who received recognition in 2005 from the Chief Rabbinate of Israel. (The latter people must still go through a formal conversion process to become citizens of Israel under the Law of Return.)

During the medieval period, they had worked as farm laborers and many adapted regional cultures. Although nominally practicing Judaism, they adopted some aspects of Christianity after the arrival of British Baptist missionaries during the early 19th century.

Their leader, Shmuel Yacobi, went to Jerusalem in the 1980s and became convinced they were of Jewish descent. Because of the long period in which the people were not practicing Judaism, they did not develop any distinctly identifiable Judæo-Telugu language as other groups did.

Since the 1980s, about fifty families in Kotha Reddy Palem have studied Judaism, learned Hebrew, and built an operating synagogue. They celebrate all Jewish holidays and have their own Torah scroll. In the 1960s, some families migrated to Hyderabad, Telangana for high-paying jobs and better livelihoods.

Today, Hebrew is used as a living language rather than limited to the liturgy. The community has been visited over the years by rabbis from the chief rabbinate in Israel to study their Jewish tradition and practices. To be recognized as legitimate Jews, the Chief Rabbi has to recognize the community as being of Jewish descent. The rabbis have taught mainstream Judaism and made converts, and some women have intermarried with Jewish families. They have sought recognition from many rabbis around the world. They always practiced their own oral traditions and customs (caviloth), such as: burying the dead; marrying under a chuppah; observing Shabbat and other Jewish festivals, and maintaining a beit din (ie, a Jewish rabbinical court).

According to the Washington Times in 2006

Many think the Bnei Ephraim Jews are trying to escape poverty and that they want to leave this region of Andhra Pradesh where six successive years of drought and crop failure have driven more than 3,000 peasants into debt and to suicide.

Chandra Sekhar Angadi, a social scientist in neighboring Karnataka, said of the Telugu Jews:

They are among the poorest of Jews in the world. They are desperate for the recognition by Israel’s chief rabbinate simply to be guaranteed a passport from that country where they can lead a much better life—away from this life of poverty and hunger.

== See also ==
- Andhra Pradesh
- Bnei Menashe
- History of the Jews in India
- Shavei Israel
- Gerim
