= Madras Synagogue =

Synagogue in Chennai, Tami Nadu, India

- Hebrew: בית הכנסת במדרס
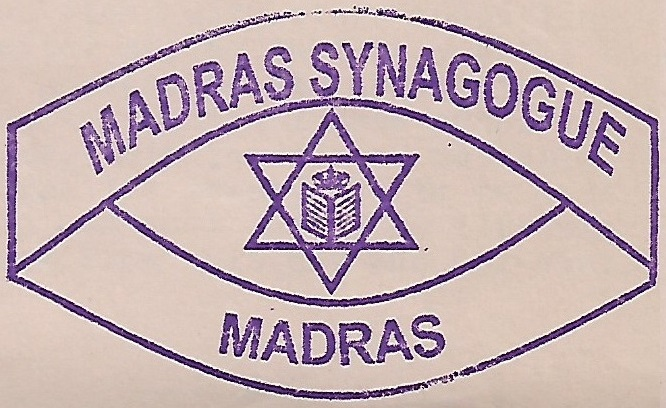
- The seal of the synagogue

Religion
- Affiliation: Judaism
- Rite: Nusach Sefard
- Ecclesiastical or organizational status: Synagogue
- Status: Active

Location
- Location: Chennai, Tamil Nadu

Architecture
- Type: Synagogue architecture
- Established: c. 1600s (as a congregation)
- Completed: 1644

The Madras Synagogue (Hebrew: בית הכנסת במדרס) is a synagogue, located in Chennai (formerly known as Madras), in the state of Tamil Nadu, India. Completed in 1644, by Jacques de Paiva, a Paradesi Jew, it is the only synagogue in Chennai. Madras Synagogue was also known as the Esnoga, or Snoge; Esnoga means synagogue in Ladino, the traditional Judaeo-Spanish language of Sephardic Jews.

The Amsterdam Sephardic community was among the richest Jewish communities in Europe during the Dutch Golden Age. They came to Chennai for trading in Golconda diamonds, precious stones and corals, they developed very good relations with the rulers of Golkonda and maintained trade connections to Europe.

Stone inscription of the oldest synagogue in Tamil Nadu has been discovered near Valantharai near Ramanathapuram. This inscription dates from the 13th century.

== History ==
The first Madras Synagogue and cemetery was built by Amsterdam Sephardic community in Coral Merchant Street, George Town, in the 1600s. At the time there were a large presence of Portuguese Jews in the seventeenth and eighteenth centuries. Neither the synagogue nor the Jewish population remains today.

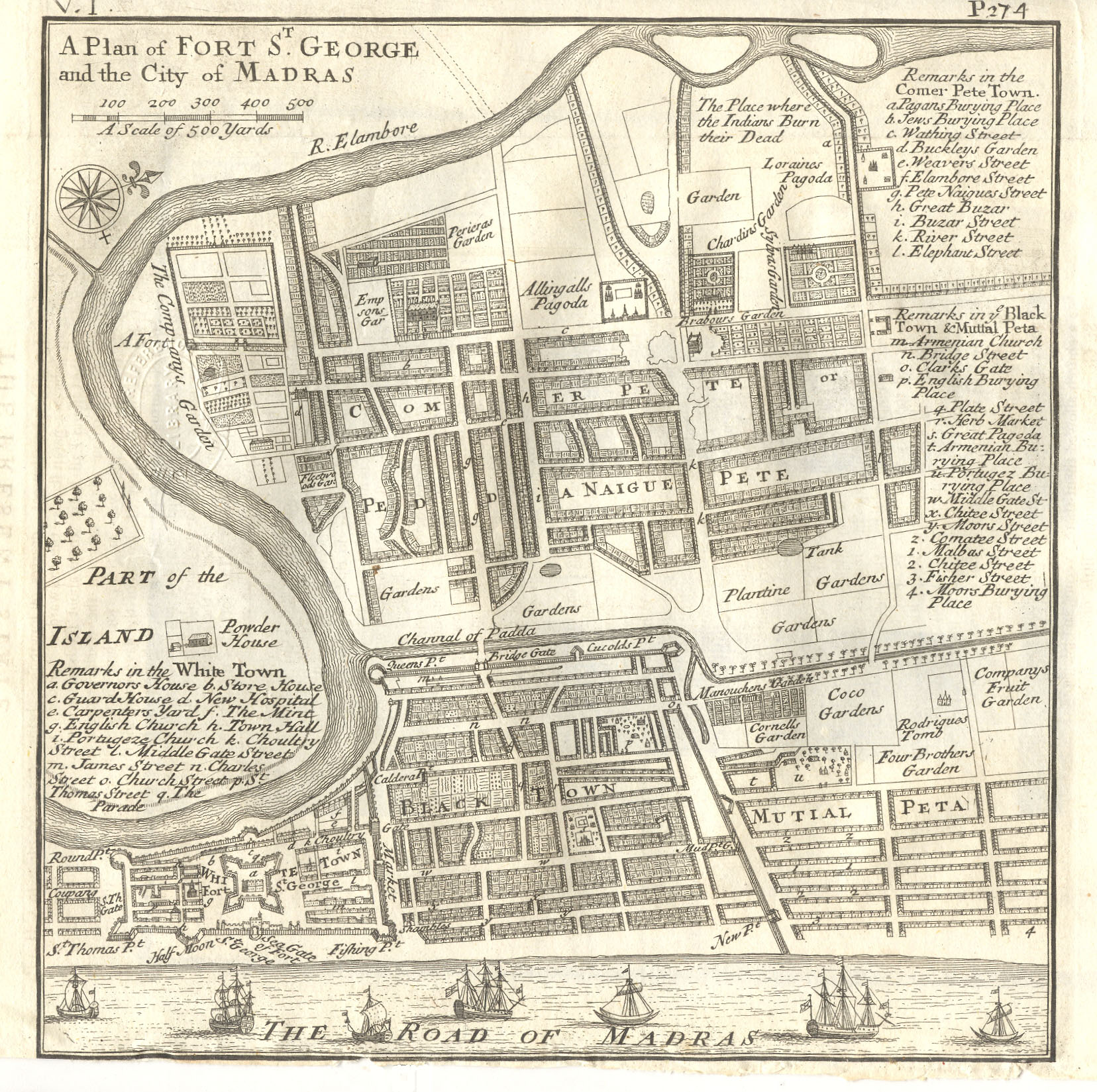
A 1726 plan of Fort St George and Madras. Market b, top right, is the Jews Burying Place

The Second Madras Synagogue and Jewish Cemetery Chennai was built in 1644 by Jacques de Paiva, also from the Amsterdam Sephardic community, in Peddanaickenpet, which later became the South end of Mint Street. In 1934, the second synagogue and the cemetery were partly demolished by the local government. The tombstones were moved to the Central Park of Madras along with the gate of the cemetery on which Beit ha-Haim were written in Hebrew.

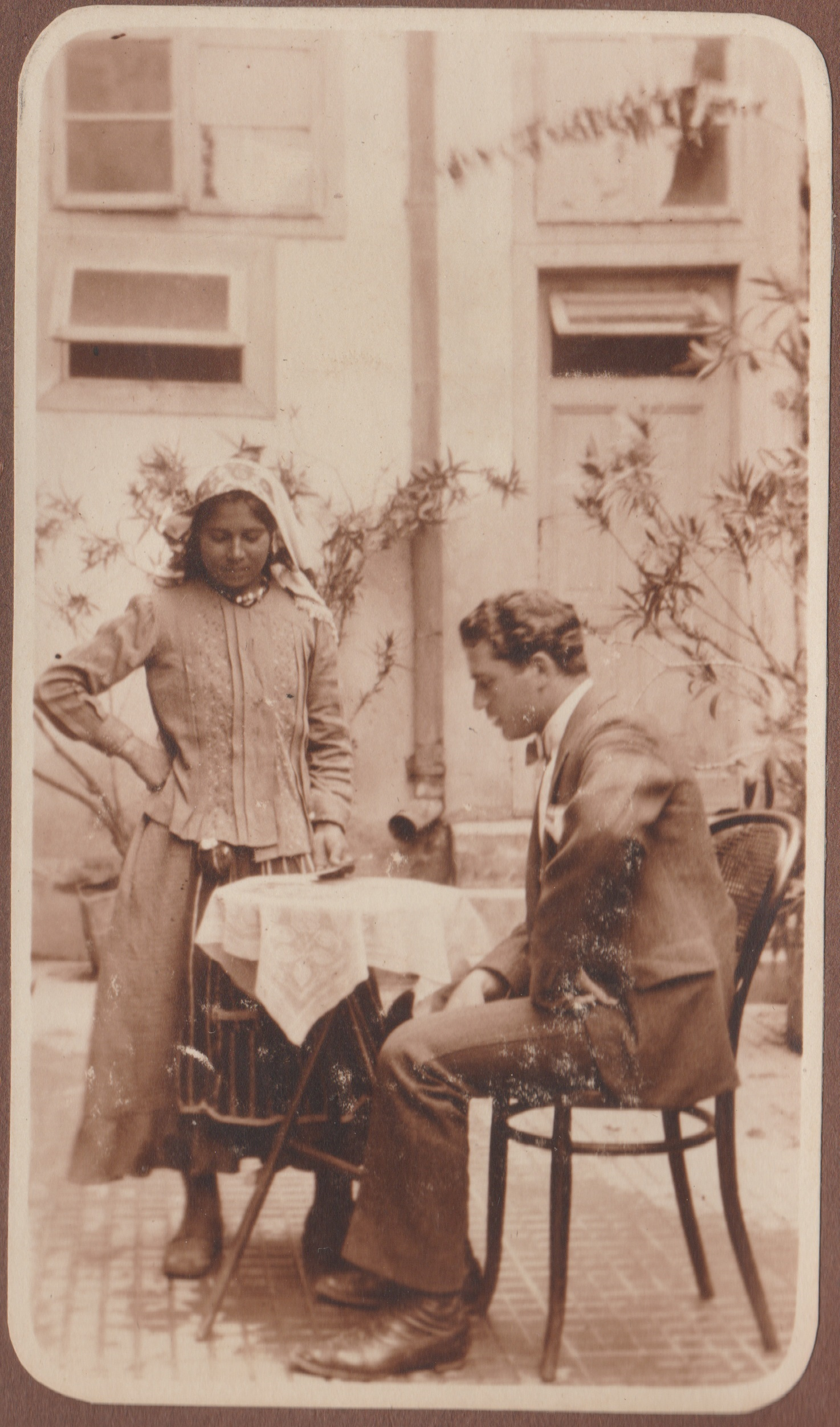
Rabbi Salomon Halevi and his wife, Rebecca Cohen

The remaining synagogue and cemetery were fully demolished by local government authorities on 5 June 1968. The local government resumed the land for building a government school. The rabbi at that time, Rabbi Levi Salomon, the last Rabbi of the congregation died of a heart attack. The remaining tombstones were moved opposite Kasimedu cemetery. In 1983, the tombstones from Central Park and those opposite the Kasimedu cemetery were moved to Lloyds Road, when the Chennai Harbour expansion project was approved. In this whole process 17 tombstones went missing, including that of Jacques de Paiva.

== Present ==
After ISIS planned attack, Madras Synagogue is at undisclosed location under custody of Isaac and Rosa Charitable Trust, Henriques De Castro family.

Henriques De Castro family has decided to hand over everything to Archaeological Survey of India

== Objects of antiquity ==
Madras Synagogue has eight Scrolls of the Law, several gold, silver and brass Antique Judaica Items.

== Gallery ==
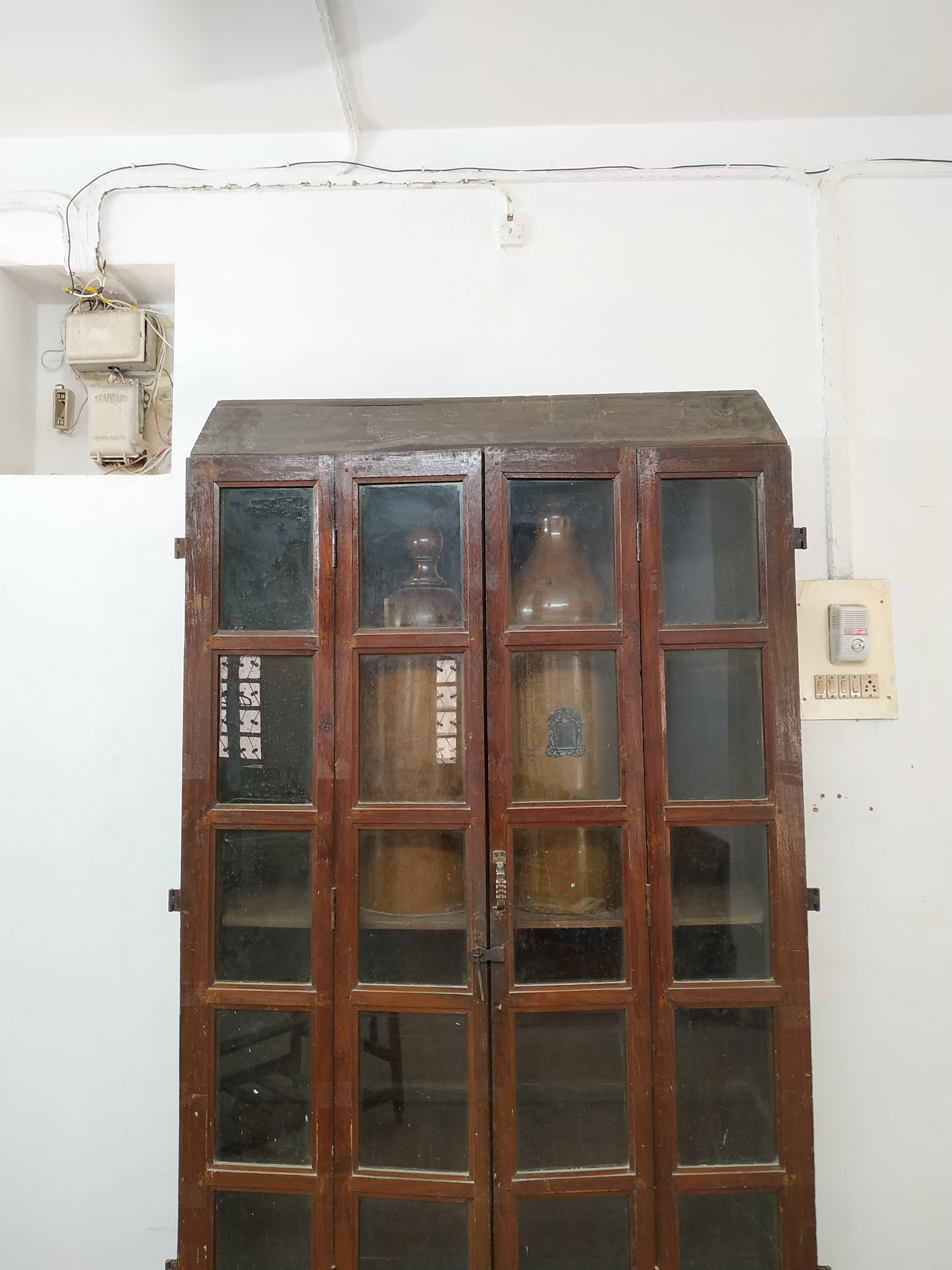
Sefer Torah in an Aron Kodesh

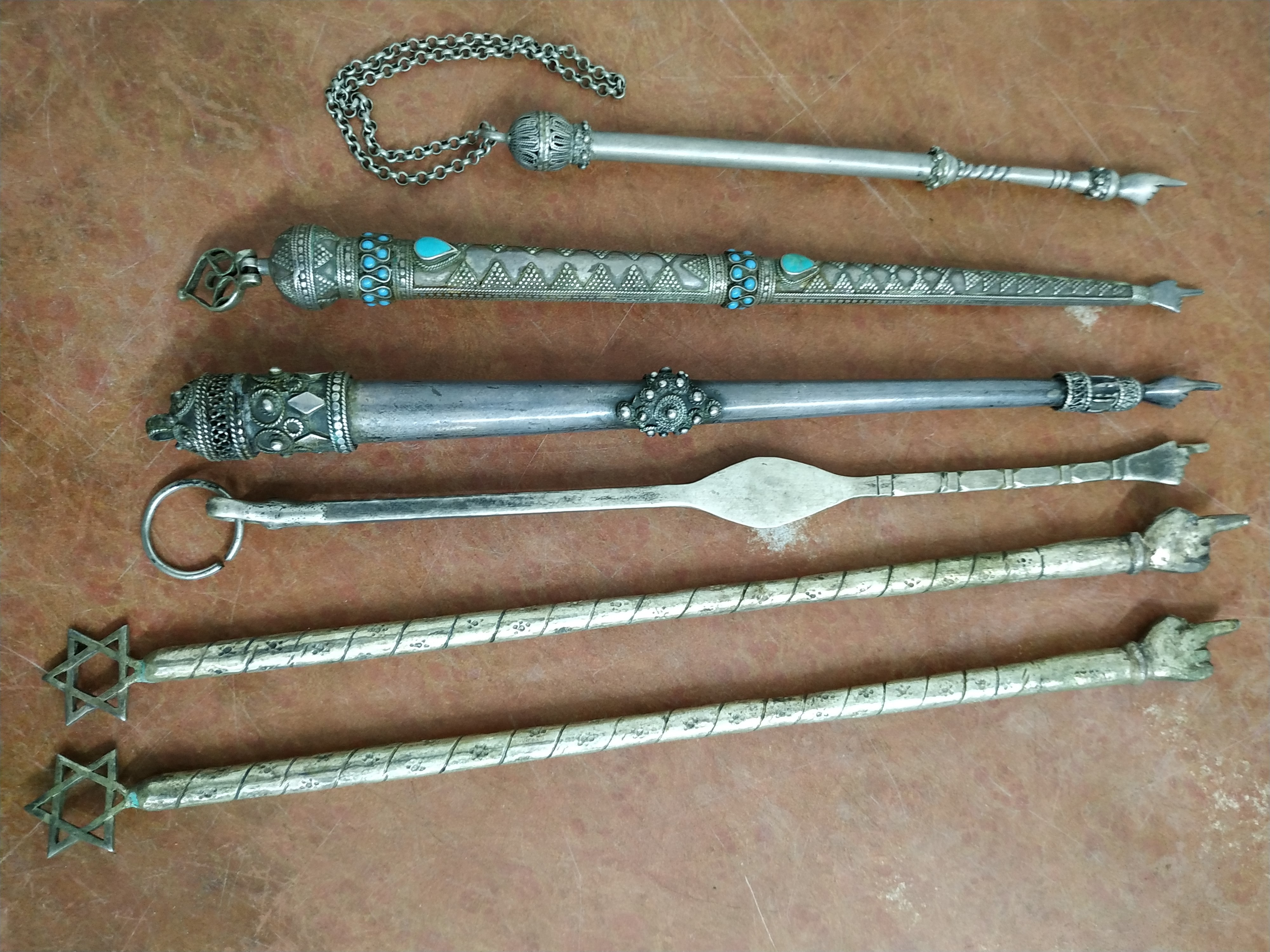
Silver Yad

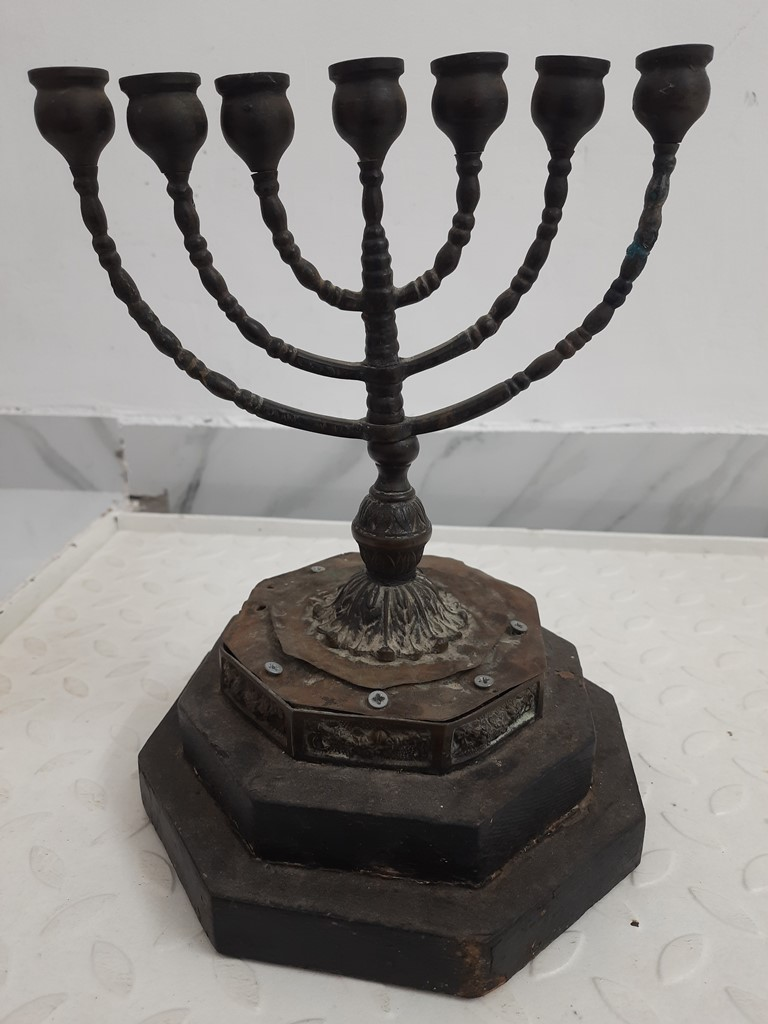
Menorah

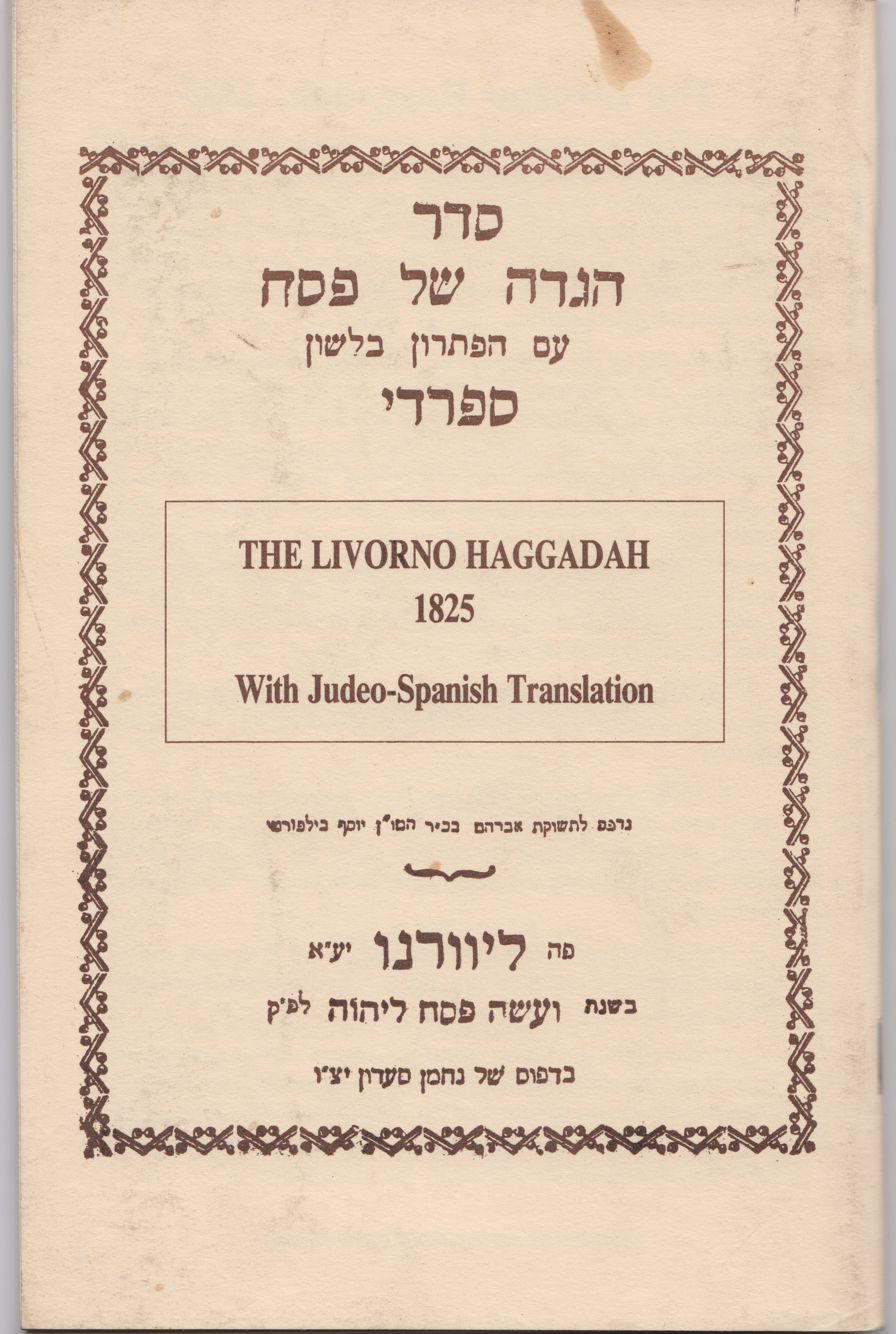
Haggadah of Rabbi Salomon Halevi, the last rabbi of the synagogue

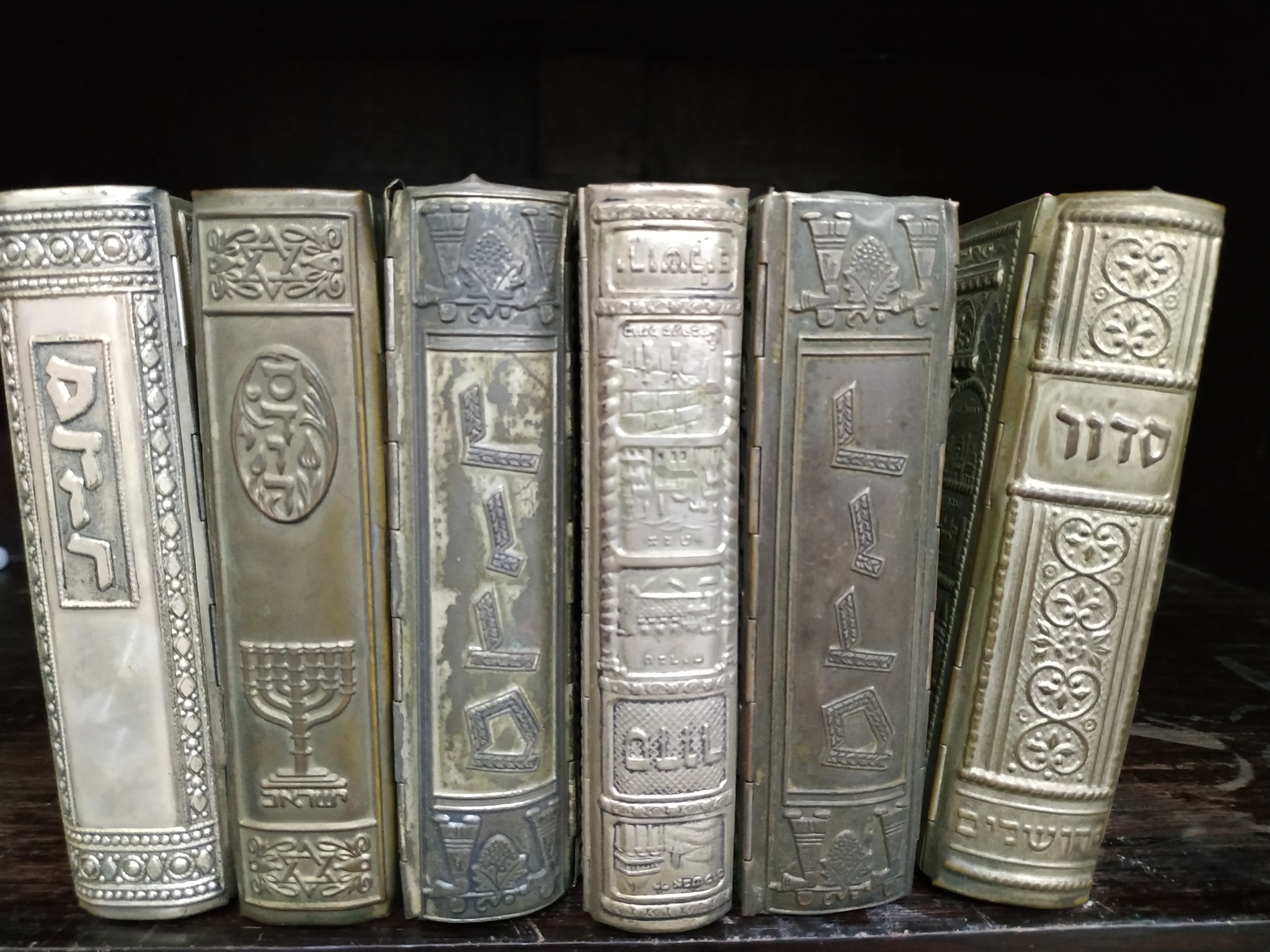
Books from the synagogue

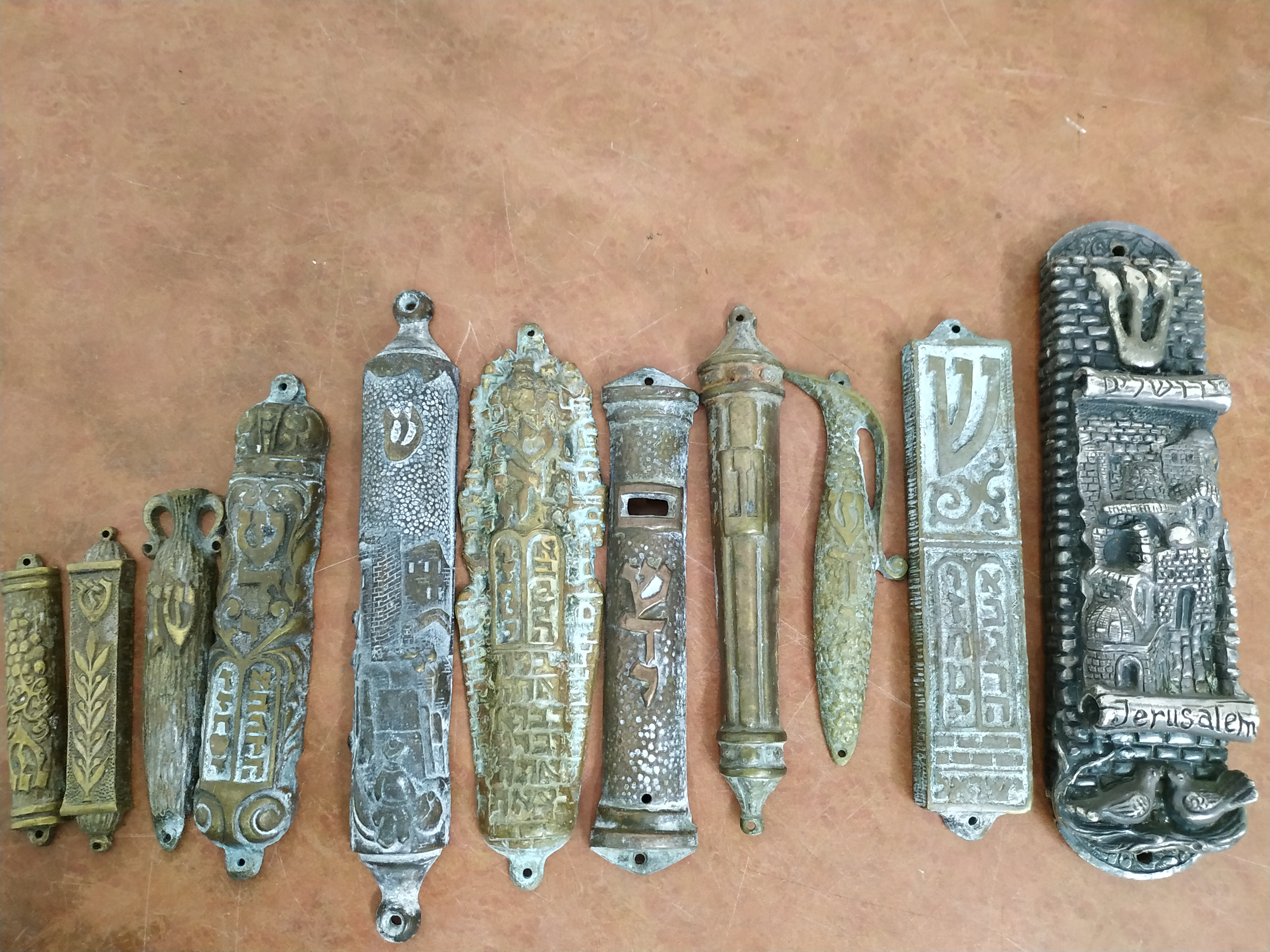
Mezuzot from the synagogue

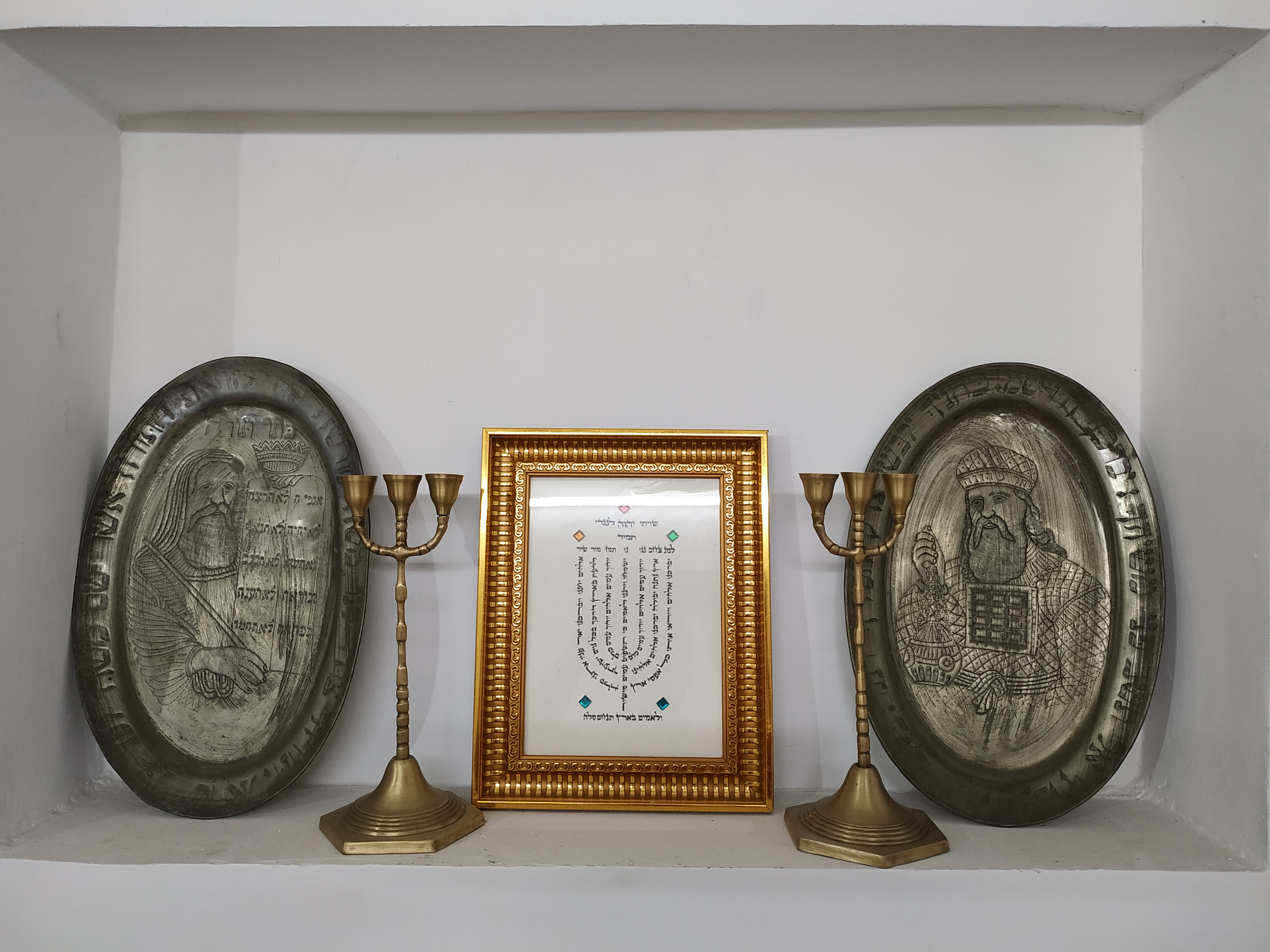
The synagogue office

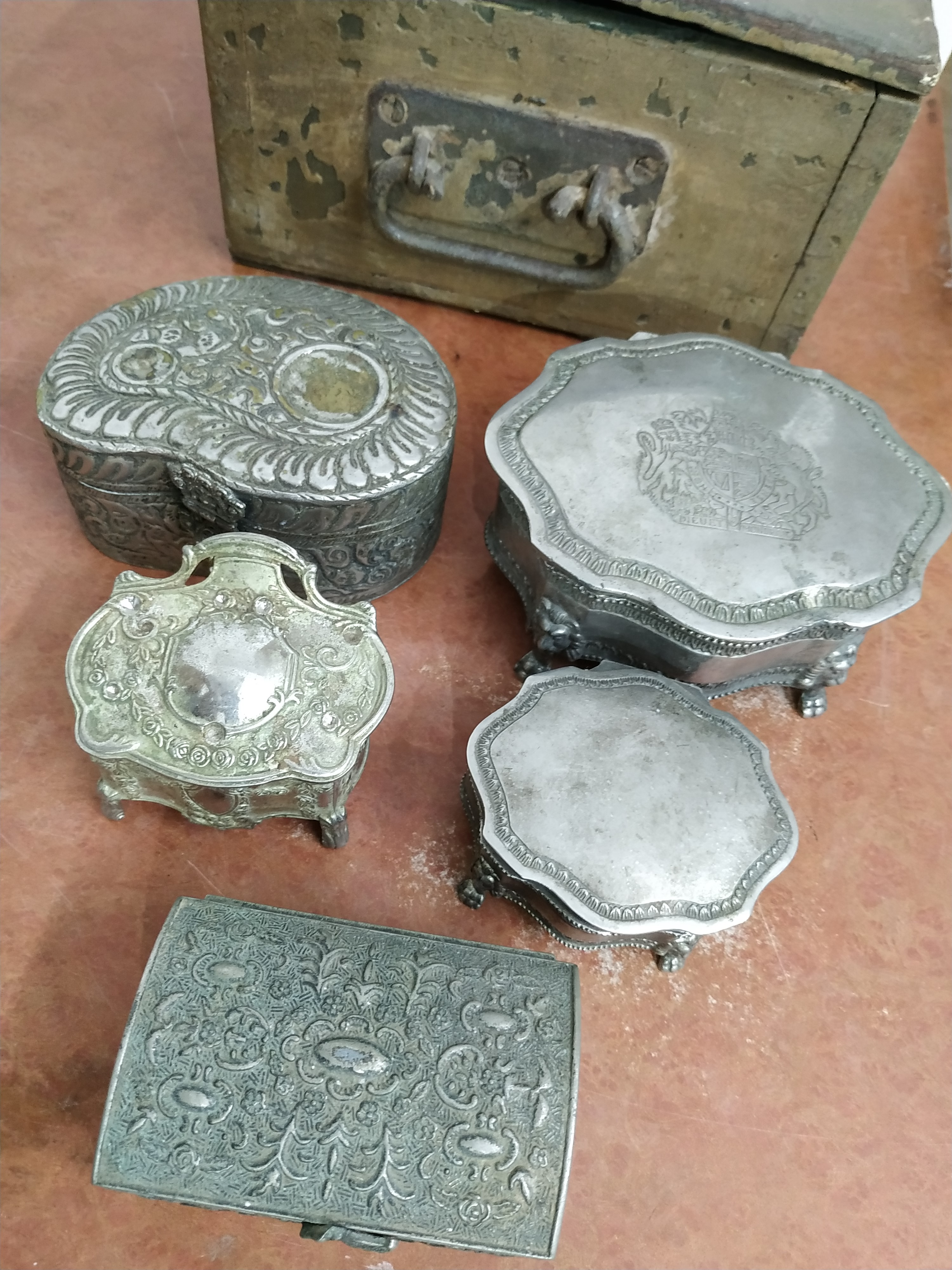
Sefer Torah decoration jewels

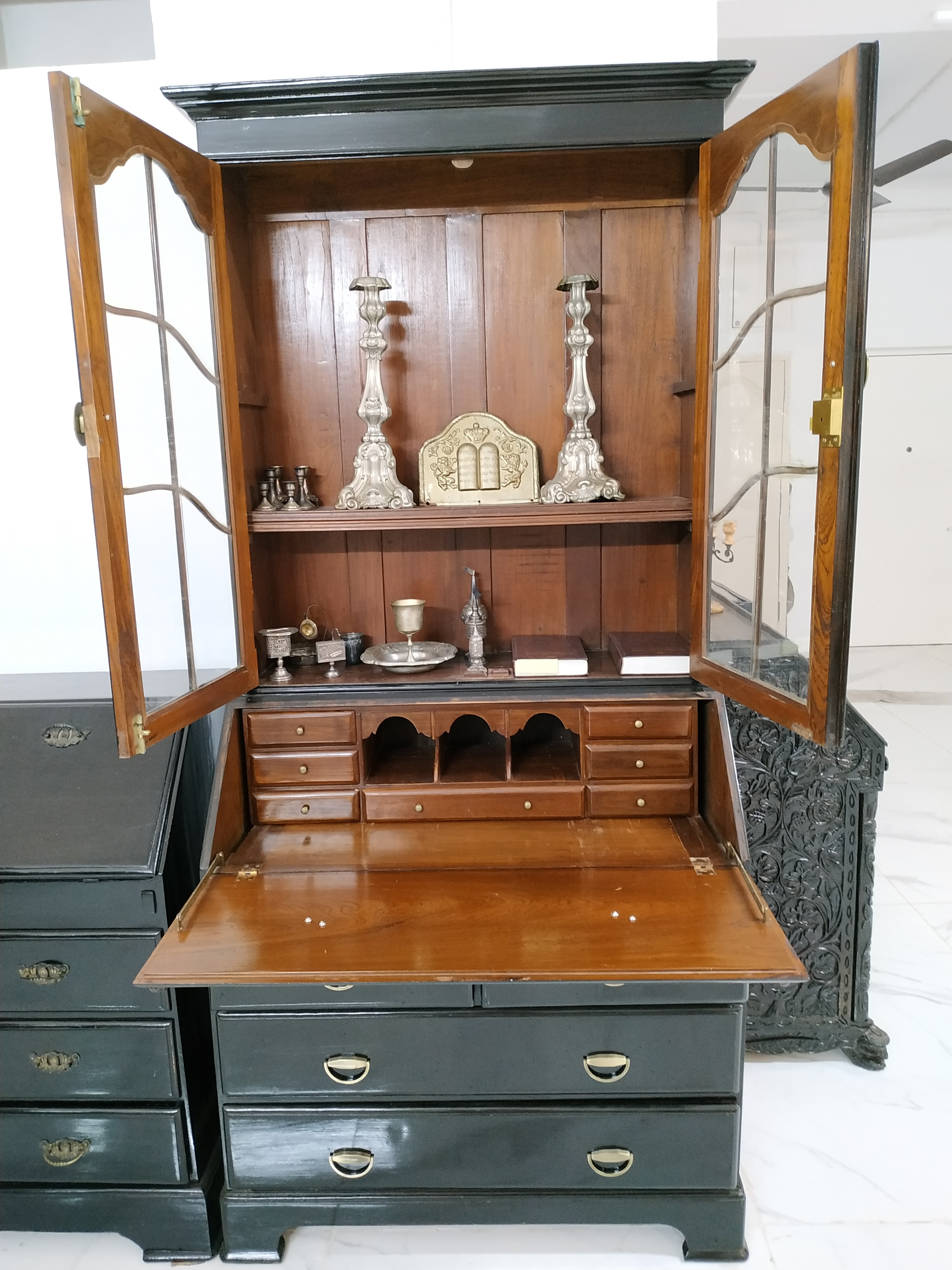
Shabbat Secretary desk

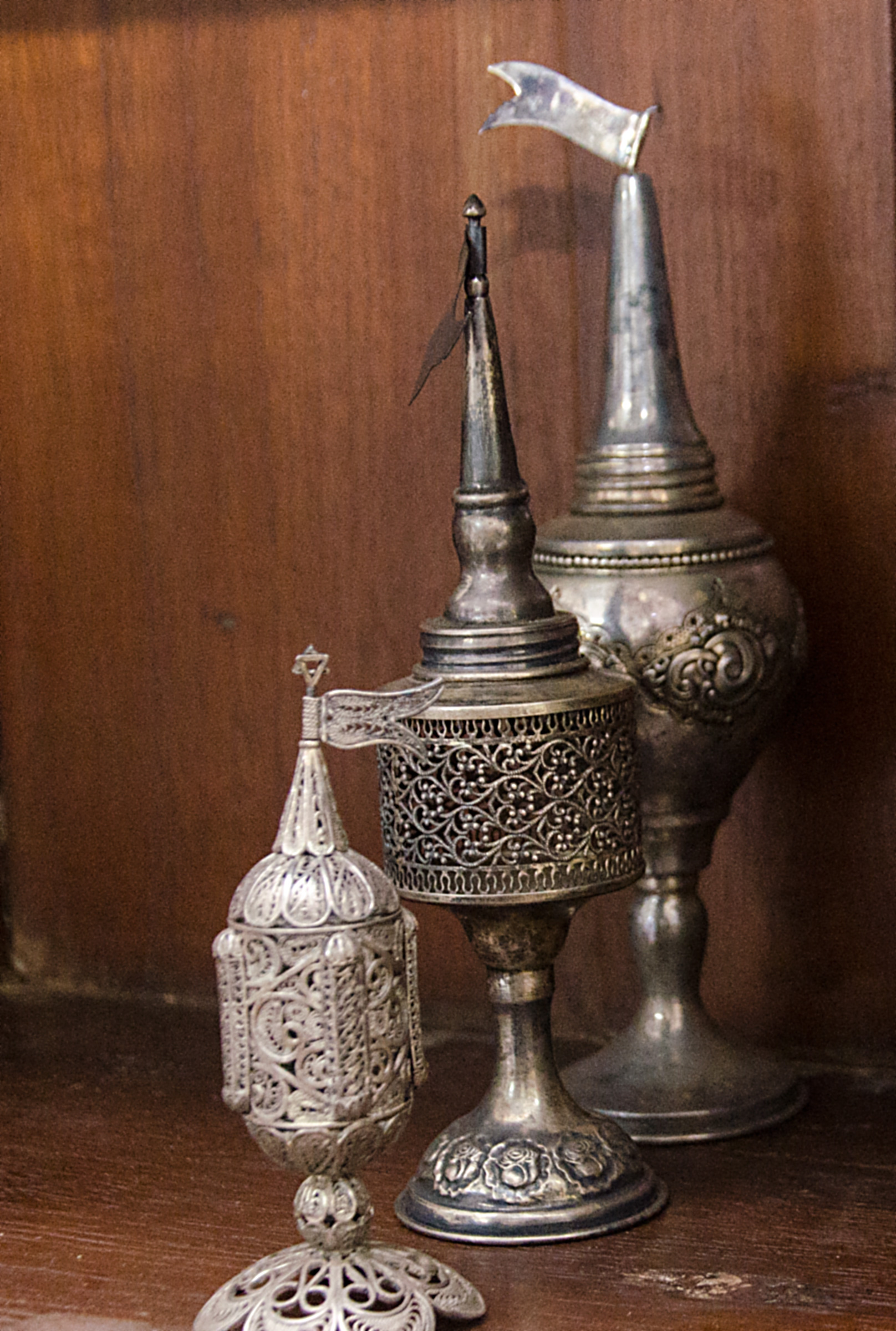
Besamim box from the synagogue

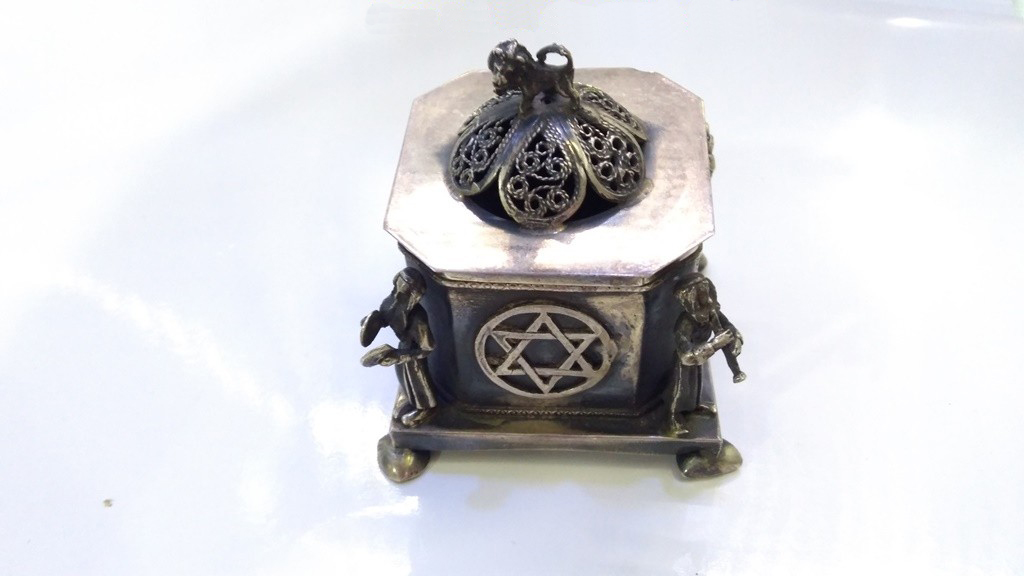
1873 filigree spice besamim box from the synagogue

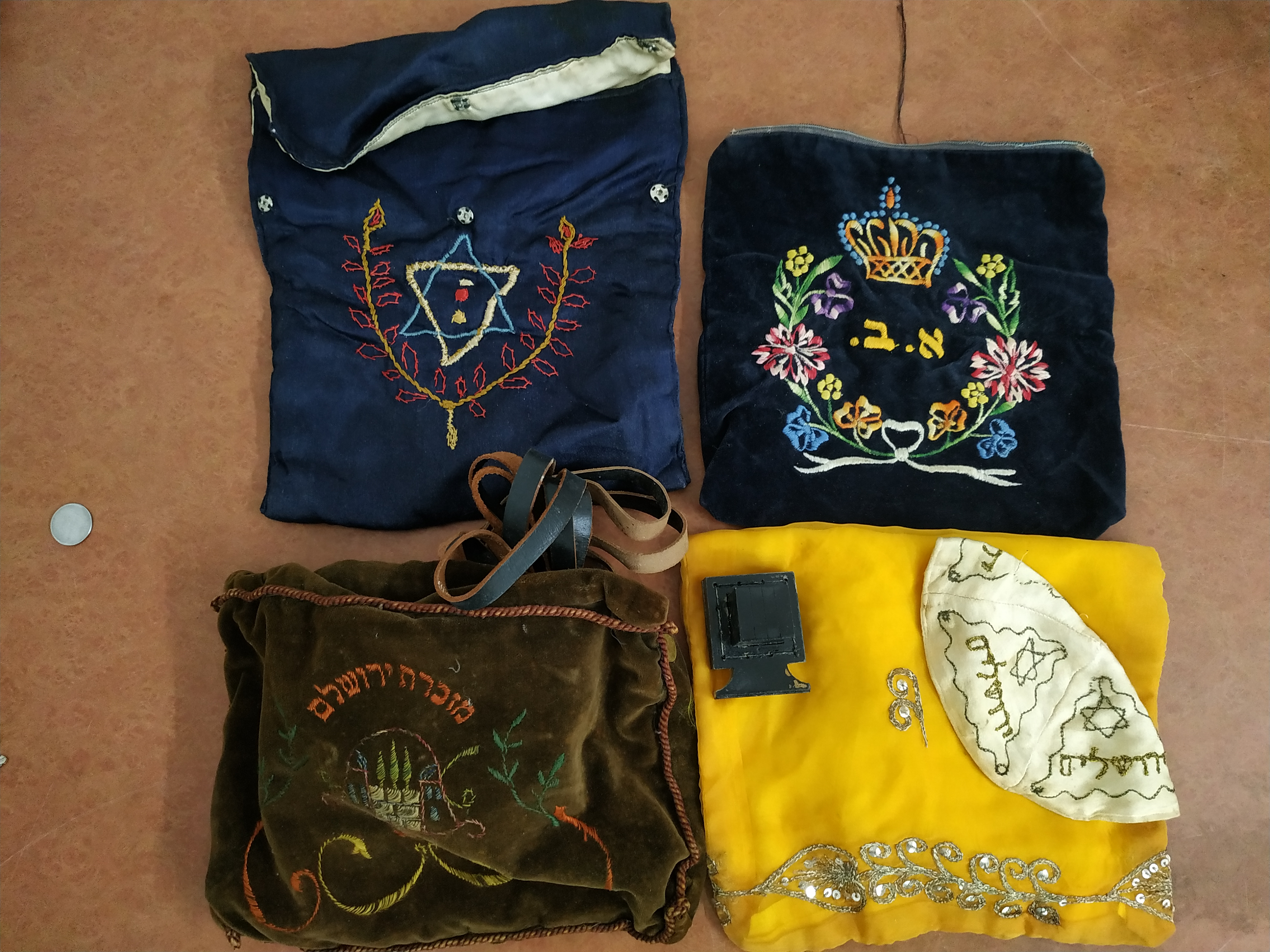
Tefillin bags from the synagogue

== See also ==
- History of the Jews in India
- List of synagogues in India
- Religion in Chennai
