= Lillian (actress) =

Lillian Ezra
- Born: Lillian Ezra; Delhi, India)
- Occupation: Actress
- Years active: 1957–1961

Lillian is a former Indian actress and dancer who primarily worked in Bollywood. She is most famous for her vamp role in the film Apradhi Kaun? (1957).

== Early life ==
Lillian was born in a Jewish family in Mumbai. Her father J. S. Ezra was a pharmacist. She had four brothers and a sister, herself being the eldest.

== Career ==
Lillian was discovered by director Bimal Roy on the set of Yahudi (1956). She went their for watching the shooting of the film. Being impressed by her beauty, Roy offered her a role in his next film Apradhi Kaun? (1957). She immediately agreed to his proposal, but her father didn't approve her. Later on, he changed his mind and Lillian went on to play a vamp's role in that film.
