= Kotha Reddy Palem =

- Village
- Interactive map of Kotha Reddy Palem
- Location in Andhra Pradesh, India Kotha Reddy Palem (India)
- Coordinates: 15.883475°N 79.971499°E
- Country: India
- State: Andhra Pradesh
- District: Prakasam
- Mandal: Addanki

Government
  - Body: Singarakonda Palem Panchayat

Languages
  - Official: Telugu
- Time zone: UTC+5:30 (IST)
- Nearest city: Addanki
- Lok Sabha constituency: Ongole
- Vidhan Sabha constituency: Addanki
- Civic agency: Singarakonda Palem Panchayat

Kotha Reddy Palem is a village situated in Prakasam district of the Indian state of Andhra Pradesh. It is located in Addanki mandal.

The village was in news when 40 Jewish families conducted prayers in October 2023 when violence broke out in and around Israel. They belong to Bene Ephraim community of Jews, a part of ten lost tribes, and speak Telugu language.
