= Jael Silliman =

Author, scholar and women's rights activist

Jael Silliman is an author, scholar and women's rights activist. She currently works as a consultant on gender and development, women of color and reproductive rights, and gender and environment issues. She lives in New York City and Calcutta. She is widely held in libraries worldwide.

== Early life and education ==
Silliman grew up in Calcutta, India, in a Jewish family originally from Aleppo, modern-day Syria. She attended Loreto House. She earned her B.A. degree in History and Politics of South Asia and China from Wellesley College, and M.Ed. in Planning and Administration for International Development from Harvard University. She went on to earn her M.A. in History from University of Texas-Austin, and her Doctorate in Education from Columbia University.

== Career ==
On completing her doctorate, Silliman became a Program Officer at the Jessie Smith Noyes Foundation and managed the Sustainable Agriculture Portfolio, the Population portfolio which she transformed into a Reproductive Rights Portfolio and introduced grants on Gender and Environment issues. She then moved to the University of Iowa, where she became a tenured Associate Professor of Women Studies. In 2002, Silliman began a six-year term as the Program Officer for reproductive rights at the Ford Foundation, for its Human Rights Unit.

She has several publications to her credit, having co-written Undivided Rights: Women of Colour Organizing for Reproductive Justice with Elena Gutierrez, Loretta Ross and Marlene Gerber Fried, and co-edited Policing the National Body: Race, Gender, and Criminalization with Anannya Bhattacharjee. Apart from writing several academic papers on transnational feminist issues, women's rights and reproductive rights, she has also worked on issues relating to the Calcutta Jewish community. Most recently, she has developed Recalling Jewish Calcutta, a digital archive which has brought to attention the rich cultural heritage of the Jewish community in Calcutta. She collaborated with the School of Cultural Texts and Records, Jadavpur University; Trinity College, Dublin and National University of Ireland, Maynooth for the creation of this website. She has been awarded the Fulbright Program scholarship, and her most recent publications include novels: The Man With Many Hats, The Teak Almirah and a book about Kolkata's holy places: Where Gods Reside. Jael Silliman writes for international and Indian media outlets, including Scroll.in, The Telegraph, The Hindu, Business Standard, Huffington Post and others.

== Books ==
- Dangerous Intersections: Feminist Perspectives on Population, Environment and Development (First Editor with Ynestra King), Boston: South End Press, Spring 1999; London: Zed Books
- Policing the National Body: Race, Gender, and Criminalization, co-edited with Anannya Bhattacharjee (Cambridge: South End Press, 2002)
- Undivided Rights: Women of Color Organizing for Reproductive Justice, with co-authors Elena Gutierrez, Loretta Ross and Marlene Gerber Fried (Cambridge, South End Press, 2004), awarded with 2005 Gustavus Myers Outstanding Book Award
- Jewish Portraits, Indian Frames: Women's Narratives from a Diaspora of Hope(Lebanon, University Press of New England, 2001, in arrangement with Seagull Books)
- The Man With Many Hats, 2013
- The Teak Almirah, Milestone Books,2016
- Where Gods Reside, Niyogi Books Pvt. Ltd, 2018
- ADDA! The College Street Coffee House, Notion Press, 2020
- Shalome Rides a Royal Elephant, 2023

== Selected presentations at professional meetings and conferences ==
- "Recalling Jewish Calcutta", Jacob Perlow Lecture Series, Skidmore College, USA (2017)
- Archival Cartographies: Multi-layering Calcutta's Baghdadi Jewish Community, in Shirei Hodu (Songs of India): Celebrating the Jewish Saga in India, in the International Conference on Art, Culture ad Heritage of the Jews of India, Indira Gandhi National Center for the Arts, New Delhi (2017)
- Keynote Speaker, "The Making of An Archive", in the International Symposium on the Baghdadi Jews in India, Babylonian Jewry Heritage Center, Israel (2016)
- Invited Guest, Hongkong Jewish community. Gave several talks, including an appearance on Hongkong Radio, and had the poster exhibition of Jewish Calcutta from the Digital Archive. (2015)
- Keynote Speaker, Limmud Conference, Istanbul, Turkey (2011)
- Invited Lecturer: The Rama Watamull Lecture Series, "Reinventing Community and Finding Home: Notes from a Dispora of Hope" at the Center for South Asian Studies, The University of Hawai'i, O'ahu (2007)
- Invited Speaker and Panelist: "Reproductive Justice: Expanding the Debate" for the Power Matters: Reshaping Agendas Through Women's Leadership conference, at The National Council for Research on Women, New York, NY (2005)
- Panelist in a session entitled "Policing Motherhood" at the Color of Violence: Building A Movement Conference, A National Conference at the University of Illinois at Chicago (2002)
- Invited Speaker at the Foreign Policy Institute for State Legislators for a panel entitled "Implications of the War on Terrorism for Implementation of the Cairo Programme", Center for Women Policy Studies, Washington DC. (2001)

== Selected articles ==
- "Gender and the Right to Mobility in South Asia", with Shikha Silliman Bhattacharjee, South Asia Womens Fund, http://www.sawf.info/assets/research-report/gender-research-report.pdf, 2017
- "Subversive Couplings: On Anti-Racism and Postcolonialism in Graduate Women's Studies", with Laura Donaldson and Anne Donadey, in Women Studies on Its own: A Next Wave Reader in Institutional Change, edited by Robyn Wiegman, Duke University Press, 2002
- "Red and Green not Saffron: Gender Politics in the Narmada Valley", with P. Basu, in Hinduism and Ecology, edited by Christopher Key Chapple, Arvind Sharma and Mary E. Tucker, Harvard University Press for the Harvard University Center for the Study of World Religions, 2000
- "Making the Connections: Environmental Justice and the Women's Health Movement". Journal of Race, Class and Gender, Issue on Environmental Justice, pp. 104–129, 1997
- "Expanding Civil Society, Shrinking Political Spaces: The Case of Women's NGOs", in Social Politics, Spring 1999; Issue 6:1, pp. 23–53. Oxford University Press also appears as a chapter in Dangerous Intersections: Feminist Perspectives on Population, Environment and Development, 1999
