= Taxali Gate Cemetery =

Cemetery in Lahore, Pakistan

- Interactive map of Taxali Gate Cemetery

Details
- Location: Taxali Gate, Lahore, Punjab
- Country: Pakistan
- Coordinates: 31°35′05″N 74°18′23″E
- Type: Christian
- Find a Grave: Taxali Gate Cemetery

Taxali Gate Cemetery (also known as Gora Kabristan at Taxali Gate) is a Christian cemetery in Lahore, Pakistan.

== Location ==
It is close to the city center of Lahore, near the Badshahi Mosque and opposite from the Taxali Gate and the Lahore Fort. The cemetery dates to the 1800s and is currently in poor condition.

== History ==
During the British India period, soldiers camped in the fort near the cemetery. Currently, there is an acute shortage of burial space in the cemetery.

== Notable interments ==
Many notable graves dating back to the British era, are located here including:

- Alvin Robert Cornelius
- Charles William Forman
- Marcaret J Forman, wife of Charles William Forman
- Sir Henry Adolphus Rattigan
- Walter Allen Robinson
- Dhian Singh
- Mary Caroline
- Meera Elizabeth
- Martha FR Half
- William Montgomery
- Dr Charles
- Sara John H
- Edward Henry John
- Richard Reign
- Sister Mary
- Edward Herbert
- John Edward Hutson
- James Alex
- Earnest Alfred
- James C S Stag

== See also ==
- List of cemeteries in Pakistan
- List of cemeteries in Karachi
- List of cemeteries in Lahore
