= Israel–Pakistan relations =

Bilateral relations between Israel and Pakistan

- Israel: Pakistan

The State of Israel and the Islamic Republic of Pakistan have never had formal diplomatic relations. In 1947, Pakistan voted against the United Nations Partition Plan for Palestine, and does not recognize Israeli sovereignty. Despite the Pakistani position on the Arab–Israeli conflict, there have been multiple instances of close cooperation, such as during the Soviet–Afghan War and the Black September conflict. Pakistan supports the Palestinian Arabs and endorses the two-state solution. Pakistan says it will not normalize relations with Israel until the establishment of an independent Palestinian state within the pre-1967 borders with East Jerusalem as the capital. Nevertheless, with Turkey serving as middleman, Israel and Pakistan have used their embassies and consulates-general in the cities of Ankara and Istanbul to communicate and exchange necessary information. In 2010, the Pakistani newspaper Dawn reported that Pakistan's Inter-Services Intelligence, following up on reports received in Washington, had gone through Ankara to pass on information to Israel's Mossad about an upcoming terrorist attack in Mumbai, India, where a Jewish cultural centre was listed as a major target; this information first surfaced on WikiLeaks one year after the 2008 Mumbai attacks were carried out by Lashkar-e-Taiba, a Pakistan-based terrorist organization.

In 2018, Israeli prime minister Benjamin Netanyahu, while on an official visit to India, stated that Israel is not an enemy of Pakistan and that Pakistan "should not behave like an enemy" towards Israel.

Following the success of the Abraham Accords in 2020, erstwhile Pakistani prime minister Imran Khan disclosed that the United States and "at least one other country" had been urging his administration to normalize ties with Israel. He did not reveal the countries' names and did not say whether or not they were from the Muslim world, but explained that "the pressure is because of Israel's deep impact in the United States," and that "Israel’s lobby is the most powerful, and that’s why America’s whole Middle East policy is controlled by Israel." Khan's administration later reiterated that Pakistan would not establish any official bilateral relationship with Israel until a "viable, independent, and contiguous" country is created for and accepted by the Palestinians.

== Background ==
Muhammad Ali Jinnah and Allama Muhammad Iqbal put the Palestine issue on top of agenda and opined that "the Balfour Declaration was unjust".

On October 12, 1945, Muhammad Ali Jinnah said,

"Every man and woman of the Muslim world will die before Jewry seizes Jerusalem. I hope the Jews will not succeed in their nefarious designs and I wish Britain and America should keep their hand off and then I will see how the Jews conquer Jerusalem. The Jews, over half a million, have already been accommodated in Jerusalem against the wishes of the people. May I know which other country has accommodated them? If domination and exploitation are carried now, there will be no peace and end of wars."

== History ==
Following the Israeli Declaration of Independence in May 1948, David Ben-Gurion attempted to contact Muhammad Ali Jinnah via a telegram to establish diplomatic ties, but received no particular response.

In 1952, Pakistani foreign minister Muhammad Zafarullah Khan promoted hardline state policies against Israel, and advocated for Pakistan's unwavering support for the Arabs in the Arab–Israeli conflict. Thus, Khan's policy laid the groundwork for Pakistan's strategic ties with the Arab world.

== Political tension ==
=== Pakistani attitudes towards Israel ===
During the 1948 Arab-Israeli War, Israel's diplomatic mission in Washington received information that Pakistan was trying to provide military assistance to the Palestinians alongside rumours that a Pakistani military battalion would be sent to Palestine to fight the Israelis. Pakistan had apparently bought 250,000 rifles in Czechoslovakia that were meant for the Arabs, and a later discovery revealed that Pakistan had bought three military-grade aircraft in Italy for the Egyptians.

The Pakistan Air Force sent a group of its fighter pilots to engage the Israelis in combat during the 1967 Six-Day War and the 1973 Yom Kippur War, greatly bolstering the Palestinians who were suffering repeated defeats to the Israel Defense Forces. A Pakistani fighter pilot, Saiful Azam, had shot down at least four Israeli fighter planes during the Six-Day War. After the Yom Kippur War, Pakistan and the PLO signed an agreement for training PLO officers in Pakistani military institutions. During the 1982 Israel-Lebanon War, irregular Pakistani volunteers served in the PLO and 50 were taken prisoner during the Siege of Beirut.

The relationship between Pakistan and Israel continued to be ridden with hostilities following these direct engagements, and when Mossad was unable to stop Pakistan's nuclear weapons program from making major developments, a plan to bomb Pakistani nuclear facilities in a similar fashion to Operation Opera was authorized. Israel subsequently made contact with India in an effort to gain support and secure a launching point for Israel's aircraft. However, India refused to allow Israeli aircraft to station on its soil, whereas Pakistan's Inter-Services Intelligence (ISI) agency had discovered the plan and prepared suicidal one-way retaliatory measures to bomb strategic sites in Israel.

According to Time Magazine, French intellectual Bernard-Henri Lévy said that Daniel Pearl, a Jewish American journalist, was assassinated by elements with backing from Pakistan's ISI over his alleged role in attempting to gather information linking a continued relationship between the ISI and the Taliban. According to other reports from BBC and Time, Pakistani militants murdered him because of their belief that Pearl was an Israeli Mossad agent who had infiltrated Pakistan under the cover of being an American journalist.

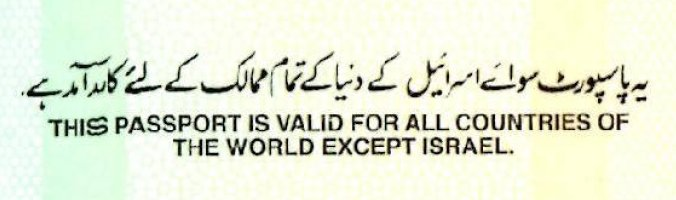
Inscription on a Pakistani passport forbidding travel to Israel.

Pakistan's religiously-oriented political parties such as Jamaat-e-Islami and militant groups such as Lashkar-e-Taiba fiercely oppose any relationship with Israel, and have repeatedly called for the destruction of Israel due to its standing as an alleged sworn enemy of Pakistan. Currently, as Pakistan refuses to recognize Israel until a viable solution is reached with Palestine, all Pakistani citizens are unable to travel to Israel, with Pakistani passports bearing an inscription outlining the invalidity of the passport for this purpose.

Tashbih Sayyed was a well-known Pakistani-American scholar and Zionist who openly expressed his support for relations between Israel and Pakistan in many of his columns and writings throughout his journalistic career.

=== Israeli attitudes towards Pakistan ===
In the 1980s, Israel was said to have planned, with or without Indian assistance, a possible attack on Pakistan's nuclear facilities that would be reminiscent of the Israeli attack previously carried out on an Iraqi nuclear reactor in 1981. Using satellite imagery and intelligence information, Israel reportedly built a full-scale mock-up of the Kahuta nuclear facility in the Negev desert region where Israeli pilots in F-16 and F-15 squadrons practiced mock attacks.

According to The Asian Age, British journalists Adrian Levy and Catherine Scott-Clark stated in their book Deception: Pakistan, the US and the Global Weapons Conspiracy that the Israeli Air Force was to launch an air attack on Pakistan's nuclear facility in Kahuta sometime during the mid-1980s from an airfield in Jamnagar, Gujarat, India. The book claims that "in March 1984, Prime Minister Indira Gandhi signed off (on) the Israeli-led operation bringing India, Pakistan and Israel to within a hair's breadth of a nuclear conflagration". Israel's plan met with disapproval from some Indian officials on the grounds that Israel would not face any major consequences after the strike while India would surely face full-scale retaliation—possibly nuclear—from Pakistan for its involvement in the Israeli attack. The plan was discouraged out of the fear of a fourth Indo-Pakistani war starting as a consequence of this operation, and was shelved indefinitely after Indira Gandhi was assassinated in 1984.

A paper published in the U.S. Air Force Air University system—India Thwarts Israeli Destruction of Pakistan's "Islamic Bomb"—also confirmed this plan's existence. It stated that "Israeli interest in destroying Pakistan's Kahuta reactor to scuttle the 'Islamic bomb' was blocked by India's refusal to grant landing and refuelling rights to Israeli warplanes in 1982." India's refusal to cooperate forced Israel—which on its part wanted the attack to be a joint Indian-Israeli strike to avoid being held solely responsible—to drop the plan.

In October 2015, Israeli Prime Minister Benjamin Netanyahu cancelled his booking at a dine-in hotel in New York City, due to the fact that Pakistani Prime Minister Nawaz Sharif was dining in at the same time to avoid a confrontation over what Sharif stated to be "Israel's naked brutality in Palestine".

== Intelligence cooperation ==
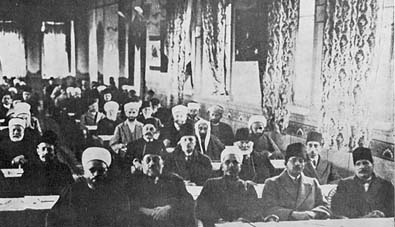
A view of the Pakistan Conference in West Jerusalem with British Indian poet Allama Iqbal, c. 1931

Despite their hostilities, both countries are reported to have directorates to deal with each other at an intelligence level. The history of Israeli–Pakistani intelligence cooperation dates back to at least the early 1980s, when Pakistani President Muhammad Zia-ul-Haq directed the Inter-Services Intelligence (ISI) to establish contact with Israel's Mossad. Intelligence offices were set up at both countries' embassies in Washington, where the ISI, MI6, CIA and Mossad ran a decade-long anti-Soviet operation in Afghanistan, codenamed Operation Cyclone. During this operation, Israel supplied Soviet-made weaponry (seized from Palestinian militants) to the Afghan mujahideen, who were waging guerrilla warfare against the Soviet military following its invasion of Afghanistan. Pakistan and Israel cooperated very closely during the entirety of the conflict and the Pakistani military—which was covertly engaging Soviet aircraft (by posing as an Afghan rebel force) and providing the mujahideen with funds and weapons—received a generous amount of Israeli armaments and aid as a result.

WikiLeaks, in a disclosed United States diplomatic cable, revealed that around early 2008, Pakistan's ISI had secretly passed on vital intelligence and data to Israel's Mossad. The ISI had intercepted information alluding to a possible major attack by terrorists in Mumbai, India that Israeli citizens may be targeted in. This turned out to be a valid report as on 26 November 2008, the notorious Mumbai terrorist attacks were carried out by Lashkar-e-Taiba, a terrorist group which had, among other targets, attacked a Jewish centre known as the Nariman House. Following these attacks, It was reported that Pakistani Lieutenant-General Ahmad Shuja Pasha was in direct contact with Israel's Mossad.

During the Cold War, Israel was part of the United States-led Western Bloc to which non-aligned Pakistan was allied, whereas non-aligned India was allied to the Soviet Union-led Eastern Bloc. Consequently, India supported the Soviets in Afghanistan as well as the pro-Soviet Afghan leader Mohammad Najibullah. American-allied Pakistan and Israel strongly opposed the Soviet invasion, and Israel and the United States ran arms and funds to and through Pakistan in support of the Afghan mujahideen. Israel had captured the Soviet armaments from Palestinian and other Arab groups (who were all supported by the Soviet Union) from previous conflicts.

== Normalization of ties ==
=== Discussions on Diplomatic ties ===
Some Israeli leaders believe that diplomatic relations with Pakistan should be established as the latter could possibly serve as a bridge or mediator between Israel and the Muslim world, including the Arab states. Although the governments of Israel and Pakistan do not officially have diplomatic relations with each other, there have been a number of instances of close contact and cooperation between the two states. According to the Pakistani news outlet Daily Jang, there are continuous reports that many top Pakistani leaders and representatives have visited Israel. Former Foreign Minister of Pakistan Khurshid Kasuri supported the establishment of diplomatic ties between Pakistan and Israel. Former Pakistani President Pervez Musharraf has openly spoken for the immediate pursuit of close diplomatic relations with Israel as soon as the Israeli-Palestinian conflict reaches a viable solution. He expressed that Pakistan will full-heartedly recognize Israel and come forward for open relations when a two-state solution that gives equal opportunities to the Palestinians and Israelis is achieved and peace is restored. He is the first Pakistani to be interviewed by American-Israeli Haaretz writer Danna Harman in London. In 2016, a Pakistani Ph.D. scholar and writer, Malik Shah Rukh, started the Israel–Pakistan Friendship Group, which campaigns for a diplomatic relationship between the two nations. Israeli Prime Minister Benjamin Netanyahu, on an official visit to India in 2017, responded to speculations that Israel's engagement in pursuing closer ties with India was to bolster its position against Pakistan, stating "We [Israel] are not an enemy of Pakistan and Pakistan should not be our enemy either." Following this, in 2018, widespread news (especially in Israeli media outlets) had begun to surface about an Israeli passenger aircraft stopping and staying in Pakistan for a day—stirring rumours that Israeli diplomats had made a covert official visit to Pakistan. There have been increased calls in Pakistan for pursuit of relations with Israel in light of what some Pakistanis view as the Arab world's naked abandonment of Pakistan—which had diplomatically, financially and militarily supported the Arabs against Israel during the Arab-Israeli wars—in regards to the Kashmir conflict with India. Following Pakistan's agreement to join the Board of Peace, the country's Foreign Office stated this does not mean it is going to join the Abraham Accords, as it is committed to Palestine.

=== Alleged Military links ===
Britain's Department for Business, Innovation and Skills revealed in 2013 that Israel had exported military technology to Pakistan. It was also reported that Israel sought to purchase British military equipment such as electronic warfare systems and military-grade aircraft parts that were meant for the Pakistanis. Israel and Pakistan both immediately denied the report and called the revelations "misleading". It was unknown why Israel was possibly exporting military equipment to Pakistan covertly, but speculations were made that could be to bolster Pakistan's fight against insurgents and terrorists waging wars inside the country.

=== Sports ties ===
Israel and Pakistan have not participated in any sports together with the exception of a single football match in which they played against each other at the 1960 AFC Asian Cup qualifiers. During the 2002 Wimbledon Open, Israeli tennis player Amir Hadad teamed up with Pakistani tennis player Aisam-ul-Haq Qureshi to play in the 3rd round doubles together. The duo would later break news headlines as the first open Israeli-Pakistani partnership anywhere, which was positively received in Israel and criticized in Pakistan.

Dan Kiesel, an Israeli Jew with German citizenship, served as the Pakistan national cricket team's trainer and physiotherapist while living in Lahore. During his time in Lahore, which he described as "a beautiful city", Kiesel said he never hid his identity as an Israeli Jew and that he never faced any problems or felt threatened as a result of this.

== Timeline ==
- 1948—Various news outlets report that first contact between Pakistan and Israel were made in the early days of Pakistan's independence in August 1947, when Israeli Prime Minister David Ben-Gurion sent a secret message via telegram to Muhammad Ali Jinnah (the founder of Pakistan) asking him to recognize Israel when it declares independence, which happened in 1948. Jinnah reportedly did not give any particular response to Israel, possibly due to his severely deteriorating health and succumbed to his illnesses later that year.
- 1949—Philippine Airlines became the only carrier to establish a direct air link between Karachi and Tel Aviv as a sector on their Manila–London service, however it is not known whether they had traffic rights between the two which would allow passengers and cargo to be flown on the route.
- 1950—Initial contact between the Pakistani ambassador in London and representatives of Israel and Jewish organizations was made in early 1950 in an attempt to open legations in Karachi or at least conduct trade openly.
- 1953—A meeting took place in New York between Pakistani diplomat Zafrullah Khan and Israeli diplomat Abba Eban on January 14 to discuss Israeli–Pakistani relations.
- 1980s—During the Soviet–Afghan War (1979-1989), the CIA, MI6, ISI and Mossad ran a covert operation named Operation Cyclone in Afghanistan to combat the Soviet invasion. During the operation Israel and Pakistan had high-level contact through their intelligence agencies, including various military dealings. Israel also supported Pakistan by providing seized Soviet-made weapons from Palestinian insurgents to Pakistan during this period.
- 1981—After Israel's attack on Iraq's Osirak nuclear reactor, a similar plan to attack Pakistan's Kahuta nuclear facility with the help of India was foiled when Pakistani intelligence discovered the plan and foiled it by taking preventative measures, including plans for retaliatory airstrikes on critical facilities in Israel.
- 1998—After Pakistan publicly conducted its first series of nuclear weapons testing a few days after India, then-Prime Minister Nawaz Sharif sent a secret courier to his Israeli counterpart Benjamin Netanyahu, assuring Israel that Pakistan will not share its nuclear technology with Iran to aide in their nuclear program.
- 2003—Pakistani President Pervez Musharraf raised the debate of possible diplomatic relations with Israel.
- 2004—Pakistan postponed a UN Food and Agriculture Organisation meeting scheduled in Islamabad for March, which would have also been attended by Israel's minister for agriculture Israel Katz. It would have been the first visit by an Israeli minister to Pakistan. Pakistan's foreign ministry insisted that while Katz may have been a member of the UN delegation, he was not issued an invitation by Pakistan. However, Katz stated he had been invited to Pakistan and was looking forward to the visit. According to Katz, relations between the two sides had improved since they were collaborating with the United States in the war on terror.
- 2005—The foreign ministers of the two countries, Khurshid Mahmud Kasuri and Silvan Shalom, held official talks for the first time, in Istanbul on 1 September. Before the meeting, Musharraf had met Palestinian president Mahmoud Abbas and Saudi Arabian King Abdullah, both of whom supported the talks. Shalom hailed the talks as having a "tremendous significance" in regards to not only Israel's relations with Pakistan, but with the Muslim world. Describing it as a "historic meeting", he was optimistic about establishing a "full diplomatic relationship with Pakistan as we would like it with all Muslim and Arab countries". However, following the meeting, Musharraf said Pakistan would not recognize the State of Israel until an independent Palestinian state is established—in Musharraf's words: "Pakistan will eventually recognize Israel". On 15 September, Israeli media reported that Musharraf and Israeli prime minister Ariel Sharon had a cordial but informal interaction during the World Summit at the UN Headquarters.
- 2005—On 17 September, Pervez Musharraf was invited to address the American Jewish Congress in New York at a dinner hosted by Jack Rosen in his honour. The event came in the backdrop of Pakistan's decision to "engage Israel" following the latter's pullout from Gaza and the West Bank. Musharraf was given a standing ovation by Jewish Americans, and talked about his doctrine of Enlightened Moderation while adding that Pakistan wanted to pursue formal bilateral ties with Israel. He also said that "Pakistan has no direct conflict with Israel, and we are not a threat to Israel's security. We believe Israel represents no threat to Pakistan's national security. But our people have deep sympathy for the Palestinian people, and their legitimate desire for a state". Visibly moved by the reception, he added that he did not expect a Pakistani leader "to be greeted by this community with this sort of ovation".
- 2010—According to unconfirmed "leaked" American diplomatic cables, the head of Pakistan's ISI, Lieutenant-General Ahmad Shuja Pasha passed on intelligence of the discovery of potential terrorist attacks in Mumbai, India to Israel through Washington. According to the cable, "He had been in direct touch with the Israelis on possible threats against Israeli targets in India." A few weeks before the cable was written, Israel had issued a travel advisory warning of possible attacks against Jewish sites in India.
- 2011—Israel was alleged to have exported British military technology to Pakistan.
- 2012—British-Pakistani MP Sajid Javid made a speech which was very positively received by the Jewish Chronicle, the oldest continuously published Jewish newspaper in the world. Known for his pro-Israel views, Javid was tipped as the future prime minister, to which a guest reportedly replied: "Of Britain, or Israel?"
- 2015—An Arab-Israeli scientist, Ramzi Suleiman, attended a scientific conference sponsored by the Pakistan Academy of Sciences and held in Lahore, Pakistan.
- 2016—A Pakistani PhD scholar and writer, Malik Shah Rukh, started the Israel-Pakistan Friendship Group, which campaigns for a diplomatic relationship between the two nations.
- 2017—During an official visit to India, Israeli Prime Minister Benjamin Netanyahu dismissed suggestions that his country's partnership with India is a threat to Pakistan, saying, "We (Israel) are not enemies of Pakistan and Pakistan should not be our enemy either."
- 2018—It was speculated by Israel's largest newspaper that an Israeli business jet landed and stayed in Islamabad for ten hours. According to the details, the private aircraft had departed Tel Aviv with a brief stopover in Amman, where it assigned itself a new call sign en route to Islamabad. The alleged trip happened a day before Benjamin Netanyahu's state visit to Oman. There was further talk that this could have been the first visit to Pakistan by Benjamin Netanyahu or high-ranking Israeli officials. Responding to the media frenzy, Pakistani government officials rejected the veracity of the report and denied that any such visit took place. However, a pilot and three staff members at Nur Khan Airbase privately confirmed to the Middle East Eye that they had seen the aircraft and witnessed a vehicle receive a delegation at the steps of the plane.
- 2020—Following the U.S.-brokered normalization agreement and establishment of diplomatic ties between the UAE and Israel, with Muslim nations Bahrain and Sudan also following suit, Pakistani prime minister Imran Khan dismissed any possibility of his country doing the same, stating that "Pakistan will never recognize Israel until Palestinians are given their right of a just settlement." According to Khan, this was also in line with the stated position of Pakistan's founder, Jinnah. In a later interview, Khan hinted that there had been "pressure" on Pakistan from some quarters in the United States and certain Muslim countries with whom Pakistan enjoyed "good relations" (speculatively Saudi Arabia) to recognise Israel, however Pakistan would maintain its position. In a television interview with Israel's i24 News, Pakistani journalist Mubasher Lucman supported the idea of Pakistan having diplomatic ties with Israel albeit without the involvement of any third party, remarks which earned him domestic backlash and criticism.
- 2020—A political aide of prime minister Imran Khan, Zulfi Bukhari, was alleged to have visited Tel Aviv, Israel, using his British passport aboard a Pakistani military jet which landed in Amman in November. Bukhari reportedly met with Mossad's chief Yossi Cohen to deliver a message from Khan and Pakistan's army chief, general Qamar Javed Bajwa. Bukhari denied the reports. However, the Israeli newspaper Haaretz maintained its claim regarding the trip.
- 2022—A 15-member delegation including Pakistan Television (PTV) journalist Ahmed Qureshi, Pakistani Jewish citizen Fishel Benkhald, and a group of Pakistani-Americans visited Israel to participate in an interfaith harmony dialogue. The trip was sponsored by the non-governmental organisation Sharaka to facilitate engagement between Muslims and Jews. The delegation met Israeli president Isaac Herzog and diplomat Dani Dayan among others. Qureshi claimed that former prime minister Imran Khan had been willing to establish contacts with Israel, and that the delegation's trip had also been approved by his government. Israeli president Herzog later publicly acknowledged the meeting at the World Economic Forum: "And I must say this was an amazing experience. We haven't had a group of Pakistani leaders in Israel in such scope. And that all stems from the Abraham Accords, meaning Jews and Muslims can dwell together in the region...".
- 2023—Pakistan strongly supports Palestinians in Gaza after Gaza war breaks out. "The first lesson of the Gaza war is that the so-called recognition of Israel debate or discussion in Pakistan has been buried, and rightly so," Senator Mushahid Hussain, the defense committee chair of the upper house of the Pakistani parliament, said in an interview with the media.

== See also ==
- International recognition of Israel
- International recognition of Palestine
- Pakistanis in Israel
- History of the Jews in Pakistan
- Israel-Palestine relations
- Pakistan–Palestine relations
