= History of the Jews in Pakistan =

Pakistani Jews
پاکستانی یہودی יהודים פקיסטנים
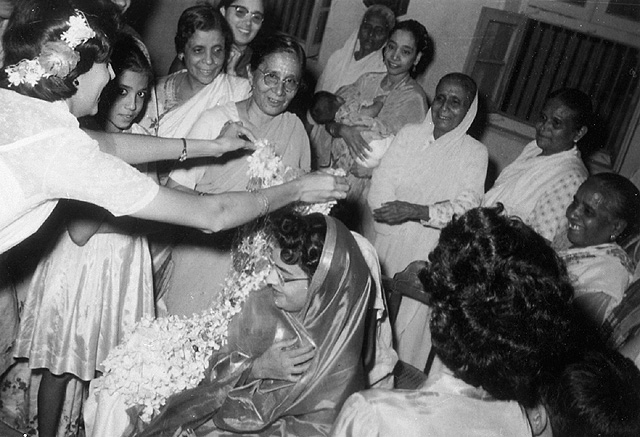
- Mehndi ceremony, Jewish wedding in Karachi, 1959.

Languages
- Hebrew, Urdu

Religion
- Judaism

Related ethnic groups
- Iranian Jews, Afghan Jews and Bene Israel

Pakistani Jews (Urdu: پاکستانی یہودی) are a small, historic community, mainly in Karachi. Most Pakistani Jews migrated to Israel after 1948. Jewish history in Pakistan goes back to 1839 when Pakistan was part of British India. Various estimates suggest that there were about 50,000 to 60,000 Jews living in Pakistan at the beginning of the 20th century, mostly comprising Iranian Jews and Bene Israel; a substantial Jewish community lived in Rawalpindi, and a smaller community of mostly Bukharian Jews also traded and lived in Peshawar.

The Partition of India in August 1947 led to the establishment of two independent sovereign states: a Hindu-majority India and a Muslim-majority Pakistan. Following this event, Pakistani Jews began to leave the new country for India, Canada and the United States before the rise of their persecution in Pakistan after the establishment of Israel in 1948, which ultimately led to their exodus from the country; today, Pakistani Jews are predominantly found in the Israeli city of Ramla, while the Government of Pakistan claims to host a modest Jewish population. According to Pakistan's National Database and Registration Authority (NADRA), there are 745 registered Jewish families in the country. However, the accuracy and transparency of the NADRA's database has been challenged; Liel Leibovitz, an Israeli journalist, has doubted the correctness of the official numbers.

It has been widely reported in Pakistani media that a man known as Fishel Benkhald, who preserves the last standing Jewish cemetery in Karachi, has claimed to be last Jew in Pakistan. However, Benkhald's identity has been challenged by his brothers, who claim to be Muslims, and he has been targeted and attacked in the country due to his activism for religious minorities in Pakistan. However, his Jewishness was formally recognized by the Pakistani government in 2017 after numerous appeals.

== History ==
=== First migrations ===
A community of Jews fleeing a pogrom in Mashhad, Persia, settled in Rawalpindi, Punjab in 1839 when the city was ruled by the Sikh Empire. This Jewish community in Rawalpindi constructed a synagogue in the early 1900s, which is located in Rawalpindi's Babu Mohallah neighborhood.

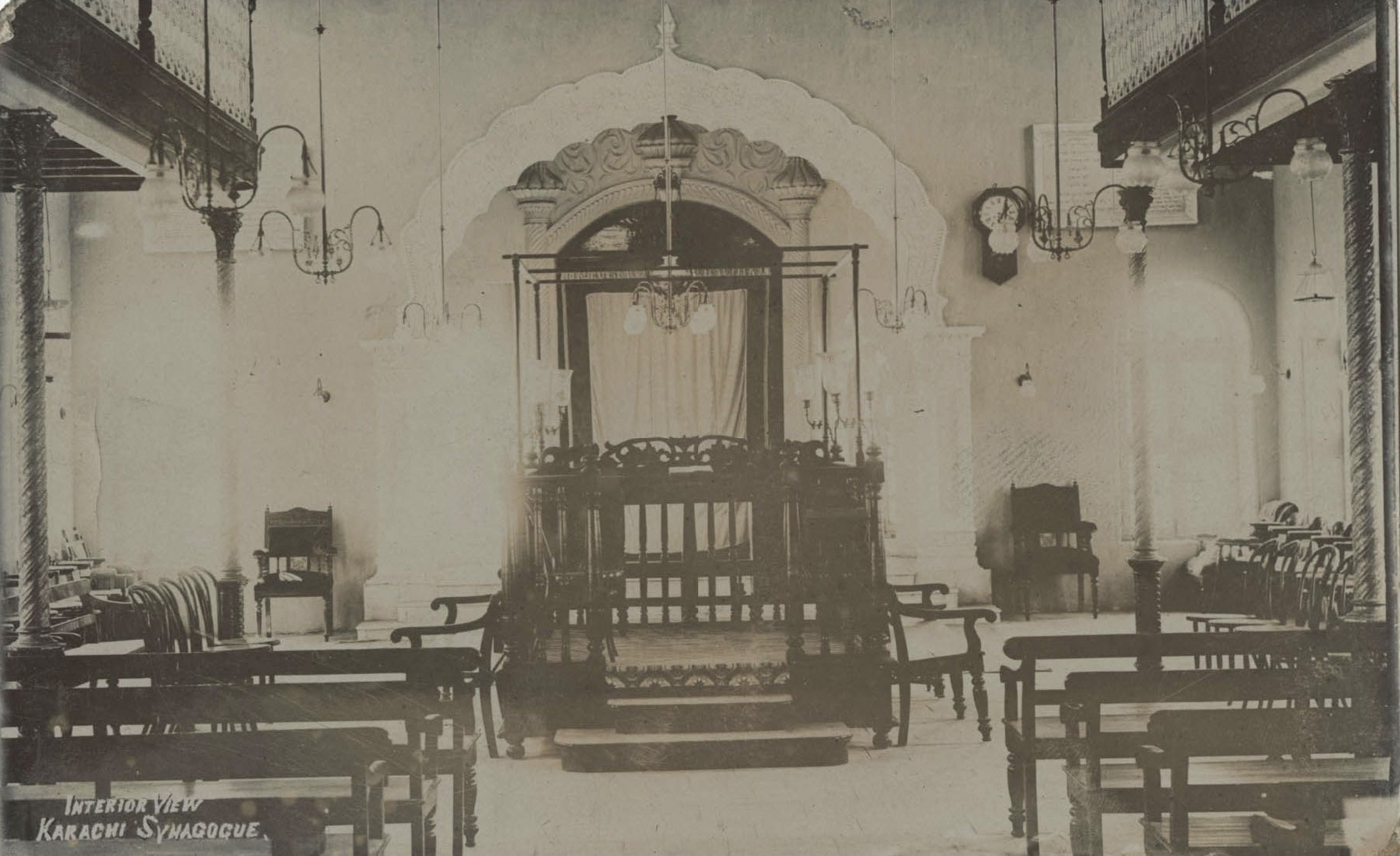
The interior of the Magain Shalome synagogue before its demolition

=== Colonial era (1842–1947) ===
According to the 1881 census, there were 153 Jews in Sind Division, which is modern-day Sindh. In the Sindh Gazetteer of 1907, Edward Hamilton Aitken mentions that, according to the 1901 census, the total population of Jews in Sindh was 482, and almost all of them lived in Karachi. By 1919, this figure had risen to about 650. By 1947, there were about 1,500 Jews living in Sindh with the majority residing in Karachi. Most of these Jews were Bene Israel and they lived as traders, artisans, poets, philosophers and civil servants.

In 1911, Jews constituted 0.3% of Karachi's population and at the time of independence from the British Empire, their number had reached 2,500. Pakistani histiographer, Gul Hassan Kalmati, who focused extensively on the culture and history of Karachi, indicates that Jews arrived in Karachi from Maharashtra in the 19th century.

A variety of associations existed to serve the Jewish community in Pakistan, including:

- Magain Shalome Synagogue: Built in 1893 near Ranchore Line, by Solomon David Umerdekar and his son Gershone Solomon. Other accounts suggest that it was built by Shalom Solomon, a surveyor for the Karachi Municipal Committee and his wife Shegula-bai. The synagogue soon became the center of a small but vibrant Jewish community. A member of this Synagogue, Abraham Reuben Kamarlekar, became a councilor in the Karachi City Corporation in 1936.
- Young Man's Jewish Association: Founded in 1903 and whose aim was to encourage sports as well as religious and social activities of the Bene Israel in Karachi.
- Karachi Bene Israel Relief Fund: Established to support poor Jews in Karachi.
- Karachi Jewish Syndicate: Formed in 1918 and whose aim was to provide homes to poor Jews at reasonable rent fees.

=== Post-independence ===
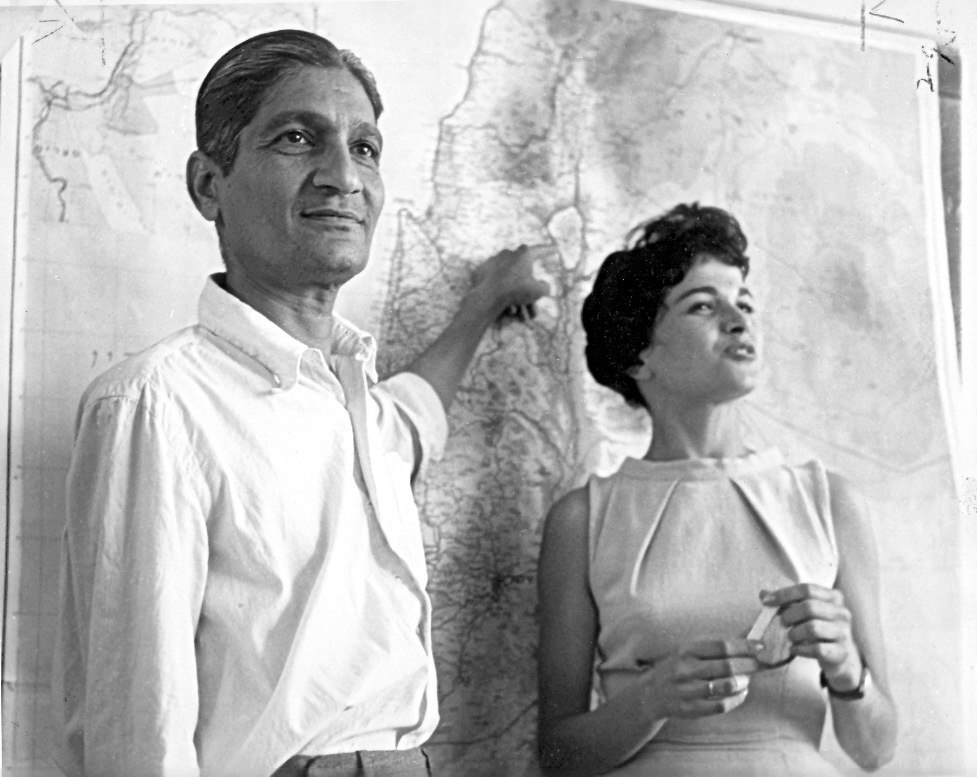
Pakistani Jews after making aliyah from Pakistan, 1963

==== 1947–1970 ====
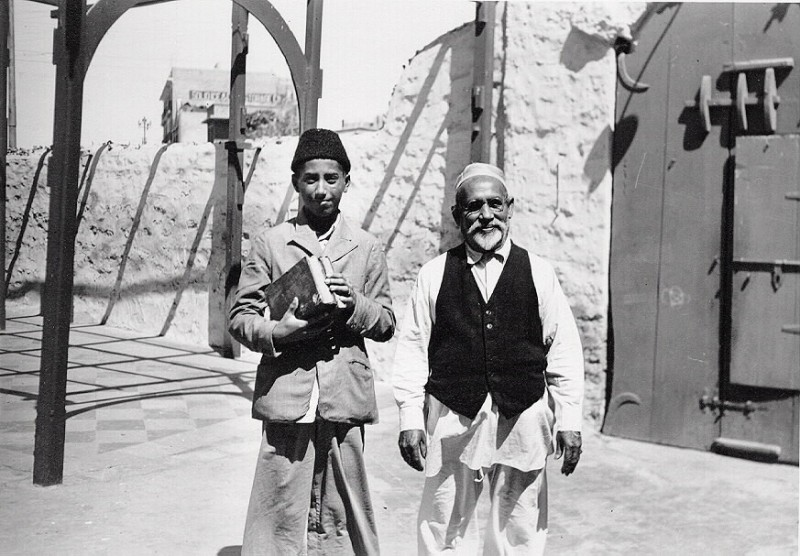
The rabbi of Megan Shalome Synagogue, photographed with his son, c. 1951

Leading up to the time of the Partition of India, some 1300 Jews remained in Karachi, most of them Bene Israel Jews observing Sephardic Jewish rites. The first real exodus of Jewish refugees from British India to Bombay and other cities in India came just prior to the creation of Israel in 1948 when antisemitism spread to Pakistan. When Israel came into being in 1948, many Jews migrated to Israel, and after the Arab-Israel war a majority of them left Karachi. By 1953, fewer than 500 Jews were reported to be in all of Pakistan.

==== 1971–present ====
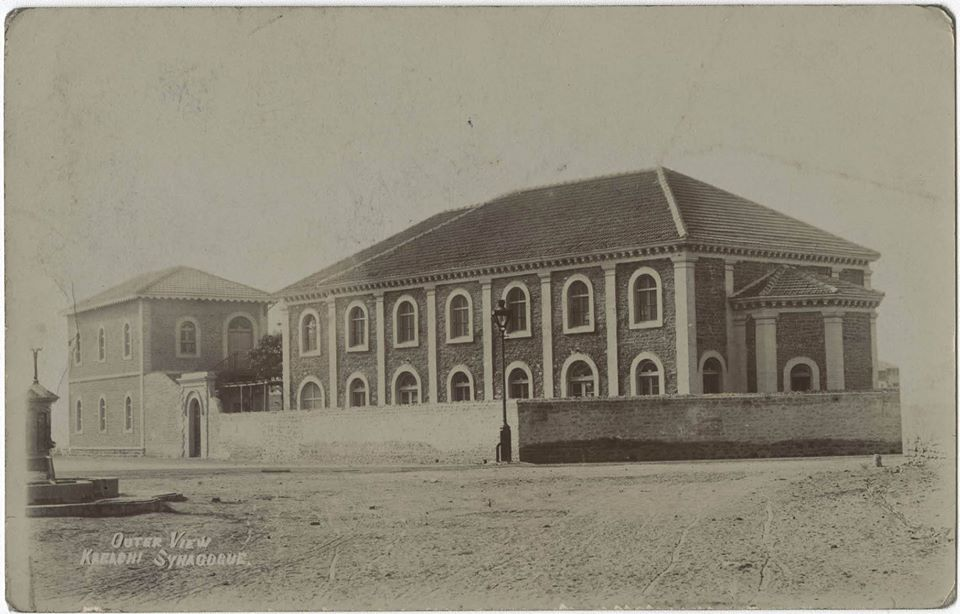
The Magain Shalome Synagogue in 1893. It was demolished on the orders of the military dictator General Zia ul-Haq in 1988, and a shopping plaza was built in place of it.

Magen Shalom, the Bene Israel's only synagogue in Karachi founded under the British Raj, was demolished in 1988 to make way for a shopping plaza by order of General Zia-ul-Haq shortly after the Bene Israel community in Israel petitioned for its maintenance and use as a historical or other community center. As per another account, in July 1988 the synagogue was burnt and brought down by religious zealots (where today a building 'Madiha Square' stands). The last custodian of the synagogue was Rachel Joseph, now deceased. Many Jews who migrated from Pakistan have not updated their status since leaving Pakistan in NADRA's database so the database must be old and there may not actually be as many Jewish Pakistanis left in Pakistan despite NADRA showing existence of Jews in Pakistan.

Dan Kiesel, a Jew of German origin, was employed as a physiotherapist by the Pakistan Cricket Board from 1995 to 1999. His appointment brought some controversy, as Pakistani politicians questioned the hiring an Israeli Jew in the Senate of Pakistan.

The term "Yehudi" and its variants remains a word of derision when directed at a Bene Israel or anyone else as noted by Reverend John Wilson, one of the founders of University of Bombay (now University of Mumbai). In Urdu (the national language of Pakistan), however, the word simply translates to 'Jewish'. The Bene Israel's prayers include intercessions on behalf of His Majesty as in several Commonwealth countries. The Jewish Chronicle of London reported on Karachi's Jews as recently as 2007.

In general elections 2013, it was reported that 809 adult Jews were enrolled as voters. The number of Jewish women voters was 427 against 382 men in the community. By 2017, according to the Election Commission of Pakistan around 900 Jews were registered as voters in the country. Also in 2017 According to the National Database and Registration Authority, there are 745 registered Jewish families in Pakistan.

Most of the Karachi Jews now live in Ramla, Israel; Mumbai, India; Toronto, Canada; and the United States.

== Antisemitism ==
The creation of Israel and the Arab–Israeli conflict led to a rise in anti-Semitism in Pakistan. The Synagogue was demolished in 1988. Incidents of violence against Jews started occurring following the establishment of Israel, creating a sense of insecurity within the community in Karachi. Karachi's Magain Shalome Synagogue was set ablaze, and attacks on Jews escalated after each Arab-Israeli war—in 1948, 1956, and 1967. Since the 1970s, anti-Semitism has significantly mounted.

== Landmarks ==
The Jewish Bene Israel Graveyard remains in the larger Mewa Shah Graveyard in Karachi.

== See also ==
- Judeo-Urdu
- Antisemitism in Pakistan
- Religion in Pakistan
