= List of cemeteries in Pakistan =

This is a list of cemeteries (or graveyards) in Pakistan.

== Graveyards ==
=== Gilgit-Baltistan ===
- Old British Cemetery, Gilgit

=== Islamabad Capital Territory ===
- CDA Graveyard, Burma Town
- DHA II Graveyard, Jinnah Boulevard
- H-8 Graveyard
- Islamabad Graveyard H-11

=== Khyber Pakhtunkhwa ===
==== Abbottabad ====
- Old Christian Cemetery

==== Peshawar ====
- Arif Town Graveyard, Shakarpura
- Graveyard, University of Peshawar, Rahat Abad
- Old Christian Cemetery
- Pajagi Graveyard, Pajagi

=== Punjab ===
==== Gujranwala ====
- Graveyard Model Town, Model Town

==== Lahore ====
- G Block Graveyard,175G Model Town Link Road, Block G Block Q Model Town
- Gora Cemetery
- Gora Kabristan, Dharampura, Saddar Town
- Miani Sahib Graveyard
- Mian Family Graveyard, Baghbanpura
- Mominpura Graveyard
- Qabristan Shahi Badshahi Bijli Mohallah

==== Rawalpindi ====
- Pir Wadhai Graveyard
- Parsi Cemetery

==== Sialkot ====
- Abbot Road Graveyard
- Baba Shah Jamal Qabristan, Mohala Powaar Pura
- Canal City Cemetery, Canal City, Ugoki Road
- Christian Cemetery, Maryam Town, Chhabilpur
- Christian Graveyard, Christian Town, Sialkot
- Imam Ali-ul-Haq, Imam Sahab
- Masjid Bilal Cemetery, Model Town
- Murshadabad Qabristan, Harrar
- Muslim Colony Qabristan, Christian Town
- Peer Abdul Shah Qabristan. Chabilpur, Nagaur
- Peer Shahwali Qabristan, Kashmir Colony, Chhabilpur
- Qabristan Sayedan, Kharotain Sayedan, Sialkot
- Qabrustan Shaheedan
- Shahmonga Wali Cemetery
- St. John Christian Graveyard, Chabilpur, Maryam Town

Toba tek singh tehsil Gojra kabootran wala kabristan is also a beg graveyard of Gojra

=== Sindh ===
==== Karachi ====
- Bani Israel Graveyard
- Gora Cemetery
- Karachi War Cemetery

== Necropoleis ==
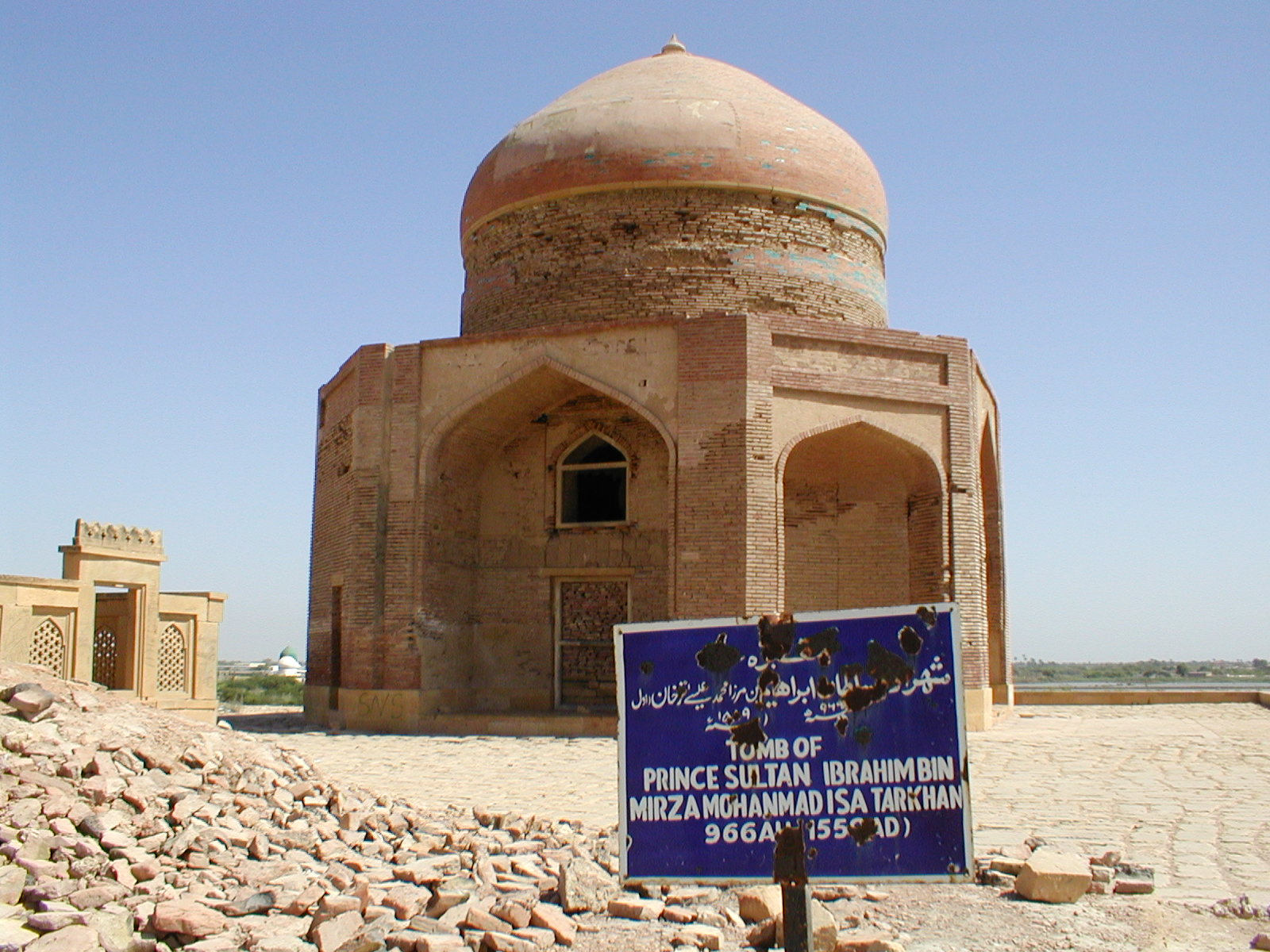
A tomb in necropolei of Makli Hill

- Chaukhandi tombs, Karachi
- Chitorri, Mirpur Khas
- Makli Hill, Thatta
- Mohammadabad, Dadu
- Mohenjo-daro, Larkana
- Nausherwani tombs, Kharan

== See also ==
- List of cemeteries
- List of cemeteries in Karachi
