= Pakistani Jews in Israel =

Pakistani Jewish diaspora

Total population
- 1,000–2,000

Regions with significant populations
- Ramla

Languages
- Modern: Hebrew; Historical: Judeo-Urdu, Sindhi, other South Asian languages and Jewish languages

Religion
- Judaism

Related ethnic groups
- Others of the Jewish diaspora (e.g., Indian Jews)

In Israel, there is a community of between 1,000 and 2,000 people consisting of Pakistani Jews and their direct descendants. Upon the partition of British India in 1947, many Jews emigrated from the Dominion of Pakistan and resettled in the Dominion of India, joining the local Indian Jews. Following the Israeli Declaration of Independence in 1948, most of the remainder of Pakistan's Jews fled from the country as part of the wider Jewish exodus from the Muslim world, immigrating primarily to Israel and the Western world; Israel's Pakistani Jewish community is largely concentrated in the city of Ramla. Sharing their heritage with the Indian Jews in Israel, the country's Pakistani Jews are mainly identified as having belonged to the Bene Israel, a community of the Jewish diaspora that coalesced in northern India.

== History ==
Records cite that major Pakistani Jewish migration to Israel occurred in the 1960s and 1970s from India, where many Jewish refugees from Pakistan eventually settled during the independence period. Magain Shalome, built by Solomon David Umerdekar and his son Gershone Solomon, Karachi's last synagogue, was demolished in 1988 to make way for a shopping plaza. Most of the Karachi Jews now live in Ramla and Lod, Israel, Toronto, Canada, Mumbai, India and in several states in the United States and built a synagogue they named Magen Shalome.

Jewish immigrants from Pakistan have served with distinction in the Israel Defense Forces and helped revive the game of cricket in Israel.

The Israeli authors, Yoel Reuben (Satamkar) and Eliaz Reuben-Dandeker are of Bene-Israel of Karachi descent.

== See also ==
- Israel–Pakistan relations
- History of the Jews in Pakistan
  - Antisemitism in Pakistan
- Jewish exodus from the Muslim world
- Jewish diaspora
  - Bene Israel
