= Antisemitism in Pakistan =

Antisemitism in Pakistan is the presence of hostility and discrimination against Jews in Pakistan based on prejudices against the Jewish people and/or the religion of Judaism. Alongside the prevalence of general stereotypes, Jews are commonly subjected to negative views, feelings and rhetoric in Pakistan, most of which overlap with and are directly related to the antisemitic views prevalent throughout the Islamic world. Widely regarded as miserly within Pakistani Muslim circles, Jews residing in Pakistan have also faced periodic intolerance by the state, which has intensified since the Islamization period of the 1980s under Muhammad Zia-ul-Haq, who propelled Pakistan towards the adoption of strict and highly-conservative Islamic practices and laws. The Jewish population of Pakistan has rapidly decreased since the state's founding and separation from neighbouring India in August 1947, and as of 2019 estimates, stands at less than 200 people amidst Pakistan's total population of over 200 million, the majority of whom are Muslims.

== Historical presence ==
The Jewish community of the Indian subcontinent (known as the Bene Israel) lived in stable conditions and did not face widespread persecution when the region was under British rule. At the time of the Partition of India in 1947, which saw Pakistan carved out of British India as an independent Muslim-majority dominion, the territory comprising the new state had more than 3,000 Jews, most of whom resided in Karachi. However, shortly after the independence of Pakistan, Karachi's Magain Shalome Synagogue as well as individual Jews across the country were subject to pogroms by Muslim mobs. Hostility towards Jews intensified following the State of Israel's Declaration of Independence in May 1948; synagogues across Pakistan were frequently attacked and largely closed. The continued persecution of Pakistani Jews by Pakistani Muslims resulted in their exodus from the country; the majority of Jews fleeing persecution in Pakistan settled in India, while a significant portion also migrated to Israel, the United Kingdom, Canada and other countries. The majority of Pakistani Jews who migrated to Israel settled in the city of Ramla in Israel's Central District (see Pakistani Jews in Israel). Despite the exodus, remnants of a strong historical Jewish presence in the country remain; several prominent buildings, such as the Khaliq Dina Hall, Quaid-e-Azam House, Edward House, Mules Mansion, and the BVS Parsi High School—all located in Karachi—were designed by Moses Somake, a British Jewish architect of mixed Sephardi (from Spain) and Mizrahi (from Iraq) origin. Karachi is also home to the Bani Israel Graveyard, which serves as the only remaining Jewish cemetery in Pakistan.

== Prevalence and reception in Pakistani society ==
In 1996, the marriage of Pakistani cricket icon and politician Imran Khan to Jemima Goldsmith, an Englishwoman of Ashkenazi Jewish origin, caused furor in Pakistan, and Khan consequently faced frequent accusations of catering to the Israeli state by Islamist Pakistani conservatives. Egyptian newspapers published in Pakistan accused Khan of having received large sums of money from the Jewish lobby to finance his Pakistan Tehreek-e-Insaf political party and run in Pakistan's federal elections; after Khan confronted these allegations and complained, the stories were retracted.

The United States Department of State's first "Report on Global Anti-Semitism" highlighted a continuing increase in antisemitism within Pakistan:

"For example, in Pakistan, a country without a Jewish community, antisemitic sentiment fanned by antisemitic articles in the press is widespread. This reflects the more recent phenomenon of antisemitism appearing in countries where historically or currently there are few or even no Jews. Antisemitism is not an issue of any significance in India, nor in the smaller South Asian countries, specifically Bangladesh, Afghanistan, Sri Lanka, Maldives, Nepal, and Bhutan."

== Sociopolitical impact ==
India–Pakistan relations have been extremely poor since the Partition of India in 1947, largely owing to the Kashmir dispute over which both countries have fought multiple wars; the Indian government's establishment of full diplomatic relations with Israel in 1992 led to a greater spike in expressions of antisemitism in both Pakistani media as well as within Pakistani Muslim social circles. India–Israel relations have led to the common referral to India as a "Zionist Threat" within Pakistani society. Pakistan refused to establish diplomatic relations with Israel following the latter's independence in 1948, and in line with its pro-Palestinian policies in regard to the Arab–Israeli conflict, does not recognize Israel as a legitimate state.

In counter-insurgency operations during the War in North-West Pakistan, the Pakistani military has reportedly flown and dropped leaflets containing antisemitic and anti-Hindu rhetoric over the turbulent tribal region of Waziristan, which warned tribesmen to "beware of foreigners and their local supporters who had allied themselves with the Yahood Aur Hanood (lit. 'Jews and Hindus')". Locals who read the leaflets were allegedly questioning the use of these terms by Pakistani forces to describe the Tehrik-i-Taliban, an Islamist terrorist organization that operates against the Pakistani state in the region.

=== Pakistan-based militant groups ===
Lashkar-e-Taiba, a Pakistan-based Islamic terrorist group, has also expressed antisemitic views. The organization declares the Jewish people to be "Enemies of Islam" and designates Israel as an "Enemy of Pakistan".

The Hasidic Jewish religious movement Chabad Lubavich had a religious centre in Mumbai that was hit by Pakistani Lashkar-e-Taiba militants during the 2008 Mumbai attacks in India. The sole surviving perpetrator of the attack, Ajmal Kasab, was eventually captured by Indian security forces. Antisemitic views were evident from the testimonies of Kasab following his arrest and trial.

=== Conspiracy theories ===
A far-right Pakistani conspiracy theorist and commentator, Zaid Hamid, claimed that Indian Jews were responsible for the 2008 Mumbai attacks; such allegations are widespread and echo traditional antisemitic theories circulated in the Muslim world.
