= Miani Sahib Graveyard =

Cemetery in Lahore, Pakistan

- میانی صاحب قبرستان
- Interactive map of Miani Sahib Graveyard

Details
- Established: Mughal era (16th–17th century)
- Location: Jail Road, Lahore, Punjab, Pakistan
- Coordinates: 31.5498°N 74.3170°E
- Type: Public Muslim cemetery
- Owned by: Miani Sahib Graveyard Committee
- Size: 1,206 kanal (60 ha; 149 acre)
- No. of graves: 300,000+

The Miani Sahib Graveyard (Urdu: میانی صاحب قبرستان) is the largest graveyard in the city of Lahore, Pakistan. It is in the centre of Lahore. Its origins date back to the Mughal era, making it one of the oldest graveyards in the region.

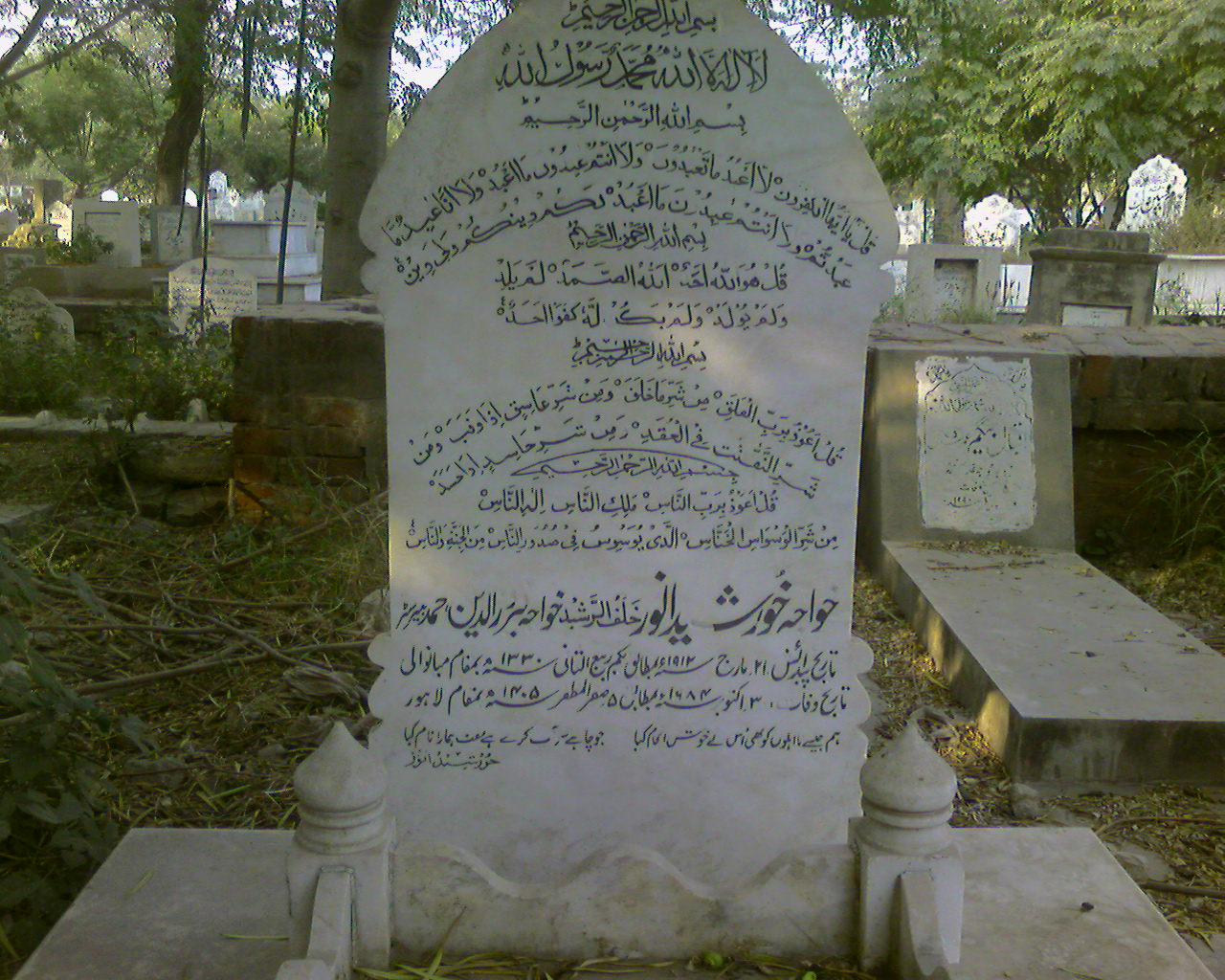
Grave of Khawaja Khursheed Anwar

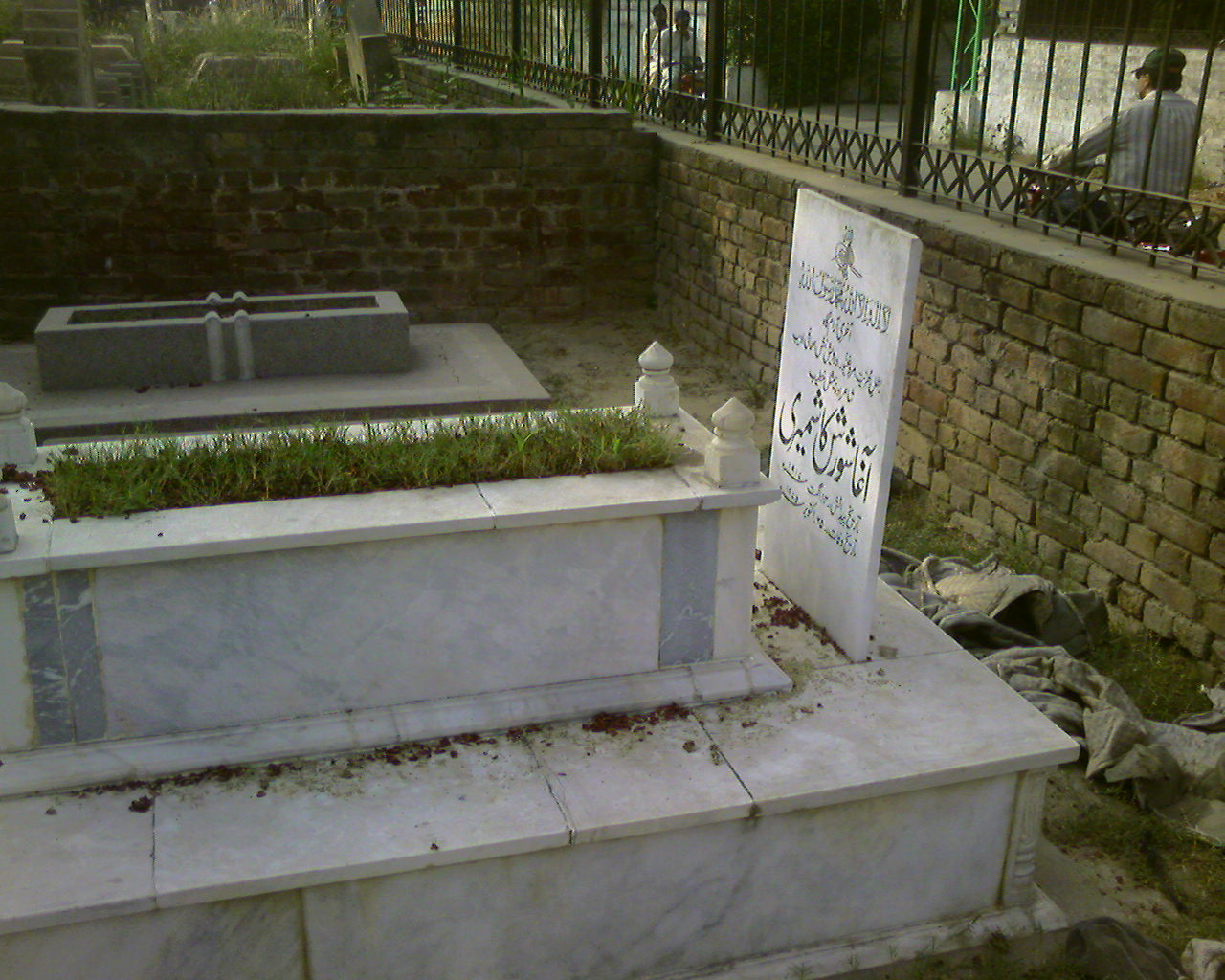
Grave of Shorish Kashmiri

Miani Sahib Graveyard occupies around 1,206 Kanal area (60 hectares, 149 acres) of land and has a capacity of approximately 300,000 graves. It is administered by the Miani Sahib Graveyard Committee (MSGC), which was formed on 31 May 1962.

Gravediggers at the cemetery routinely bury the bodies of the newly deceased in plots that go unvisited.

== Notable interments ==
- Hazrat Maulana Ahmed Ali Lahori
- Hazrat Sheikh Muhammad Tahir Bandagi Lahori
- Dulla Bhatti (Rai Abdullah Bhatti)
- Ilm-ud-din
- Saghar Siddiqui
- Hakim Ahmad Shuja
- Anwar Kamal Pasha
- Shaukat Thanvi
- Khwaja Khurshid Anwar
- Major Shabbir Sharif Shaheed
- Saadat Hassan Manto
- Agha Hashar Kashmiri
- Wasif Ali Wasif
- Syed Wajid Ali
- Ihsan Danish
- Muhammad Pervaiz Malik
- Dawood Ghaznavi
- Pervaiz Waheed Sheikh

== See also ==
- List of cemeteries in Pakistan
- List of cemeteries in Karachi
- List of cemeteries in Lahore
