= Wasif Ali Wasif =

Pakistani scholar and poet (1929–1993)

- واصف علی واصف
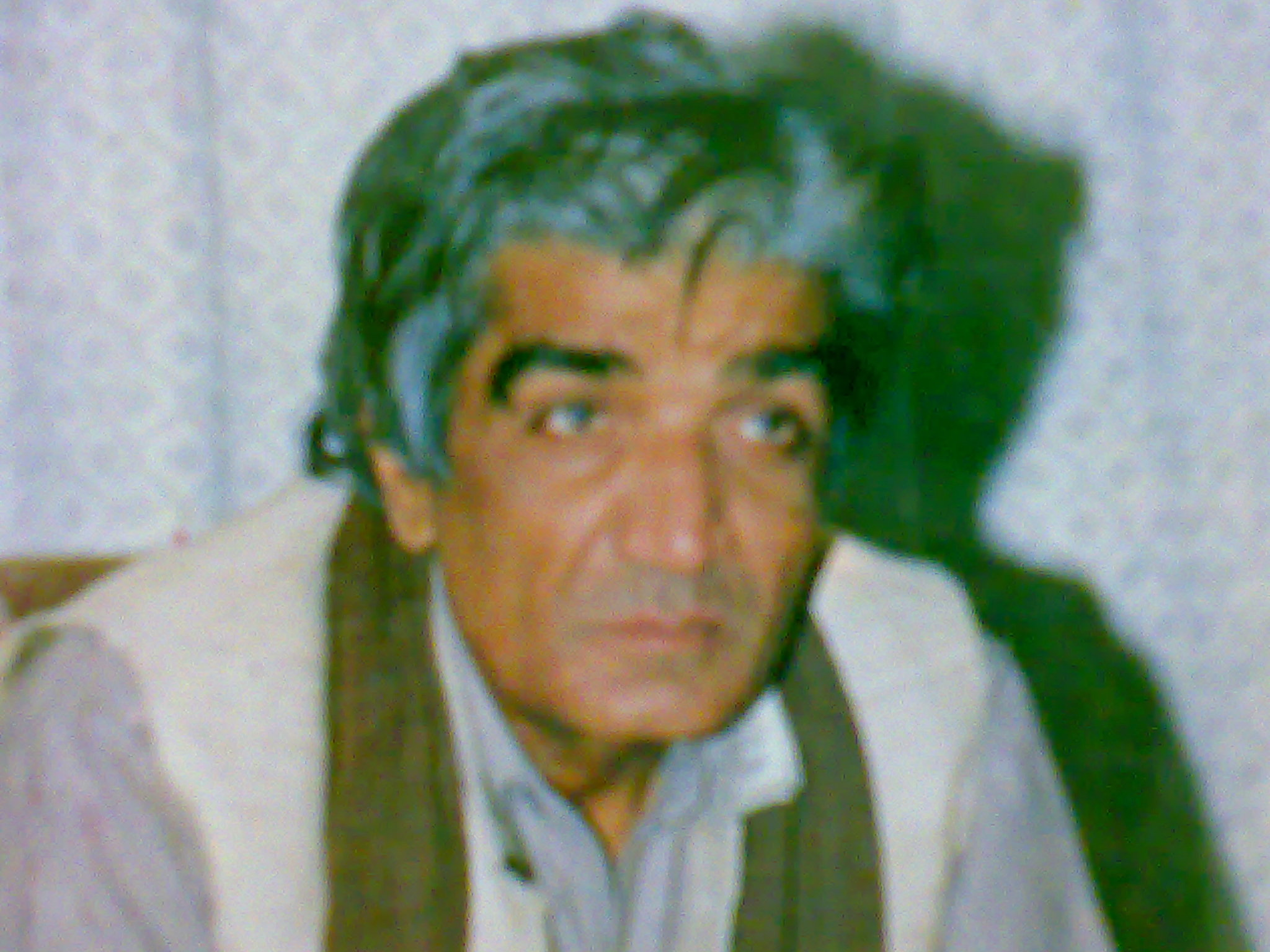
- Wasif Ali Wasif on the cover of his published book Dil Darya Sumandar
- Born: Malik Muhammad Wasif; 15 January 1929; Khushab, Punjab, British India
- Died: 18 January 1993 (aged 64); Lahore, Punjab, Pakistan
- Burial place: Miani Sahib Graveyard, Lahore, Punjab, Pakistan, 31°32′59″N 74°18′39″E
- Other name: Baba G Huzur
- Occupations: Teacher; Poet; Essayist
- Known for: Books; Columns
- Notable work: "Kiran Kiran Suraj"; Qatra Qatra Qulzam; Dil Darya Sumandar "Harf Harf Haqeqat"; Guftugu
- Children: 4
- Website: wasifaliwasif.pk

Malik Muhammad Wasif (15 January 1929 – 18 January 1993), best known through his pen-name Wasif Ali Wasif, was a Pakistani teacher, writer, poet and Sufi figure.

The author of some 40 books, he is known for his aphorisms and short prose pieces and essays, often taken from his columns in Urdu newspapers, many of these books being collections of his speeches and public lectures, while he has also written poetry.

He was close to some of Pakistan's best-known intellectuals of his era such as Qudratullah Shahab, Ashfaq Ahmed and Hanif Ramay.

== Early life and education ==
Wasif was born to Malik Muhammed Arif into a family of the Awan clan on 15 January 1929 in Khushab, Punjab.

After getting his early religious education from his father, he matriculated from Government High School Khushab in 1944 before moving to Jhang, where his maternal grandfather was the headmaster of a Government High School, later graduating from Government Degree College Jhang. Moving to Lahore, he earned his MSc in Mathematics from Government Islamia College Civil Lines, Lahore and MA in English from Government College, Lahore (GC).

As a student, he was a good player of hockey and started writing for the GC magazine Ravi, in both Urdu and English.

== Professional career ==
In 1954, Wasif passed the Punjab Civil Service (PCS) examination but chose to become a teacher instead. After teaching in some private institutions for some time, he founded Lahore College for English (Lahore English College) near Anarkali in Lahore, in 1958.

== Books ==
This is a list of Wasif's books, both originals works as well compilations and translations:

- Shab Chiragh (Urdu poetry) 1978
- Kiran Kiran Sooraj (Aphorism) 1983
- The Beaming Soul (English version of Kiran Kiran Sooraj) 2008
- Dil Darya Sumandar (Essays) 1987
- Qatra Qatra Qulzum (Essays) 1989
- Ocean in Drop (English version of Qatra Qatra Qulzam) 1989
- Harf Harf Haqeeqat (Essays) 1994
- The Truth Unveiled (English version of Harf Harf Haqeeqat) 2023
- Bharay Bharolay (Punjabi poetry) 1994
- Shab Raaz (Urdu poetry) 1994
- Baat Say Baat (Aphorism) 1995
- Segue of Spiritual Whispers (English version of Baat Se Baat) 2023
- Gumnam Adeeb (Letters) 19??
- Anonymous Writer (English version of Gumnam Adeeb) 2023
- Mukalama (Dialogue, Speeches & Interview) 1990
- Ziker-e-Habeeb (Na'tia poetry) 2004
- Dareechay (Aphorism) 2004
- Doors To The Insight (English version of Dareechay) 2022
- WasifYat (Essays) 2013
- Kulyat-e-Wasif Ali Wasif (Poetry) 2014
- Aqwaal-e-Wasif Ali Wasif Ka Encyclopedia 2014
- Guftgoo (Questions & Answers Series – 30 volumes)
- Guftgoo 1–5 (volume 1) 2015
- Guftgoo 6–10 (volume 2) 2015
- Guftgoo 11–15 (volume 3) 2015
- Guftgoo 16–20 (volume 4) 2015
- Guftgoo 21–25 (volume 5) 2015

== Further notes ==
- Staff report (21 September 2003). "Wasif Ali Wasif's Urs begins". Daily Times (Pakistan).
- Staff report (9 August 2007). "Wasif Ali Wasif remembered". Daily Times (Pakistan).
- "Capturing the wisdom of modern mystic". The News International (Pakistan). 10 July 2009.
- Ajaz ul Haq (2009). Ferma'ish. Islamabad, Pakistan: National Book Foundation.
