= List of cemeteries in Lahore =

Following is an incomplete list of major cemeteries in Lahore, Pakistan.

- Gora Cemetery
- Miani Sahib Graveyard
- Mominpura Graveyard
- Taxali Gate Cemetery
