= Mewa Shah =

19th century Sufi saint of Sindh, Pakistan

Mewa Shah (Sindhi: ميوه شاه) was a 19th-century Sufi saint who was buried in Mewa Shah Graveyard in SITE Town, Karachi, Sindh, Pakistan.

In the 19th century Sufi Mewa Shah struggled against the British colonial rule in Karachi, British India. He was jailed and eventually exiled by the British. According to legend, Mewa Shah boarded the ship taking him into exile, said his prayers on the waves of the Arabian Sea and mounted a large fish, which took him back to the shores of Karachi.
