= Magain Shalome Synagogue =

Former Jewish synagogue in Karachi, Pakistan

- Urdu: مگین شلوم کنیسہ; Hebrew: בית הכנסת מגן שלום
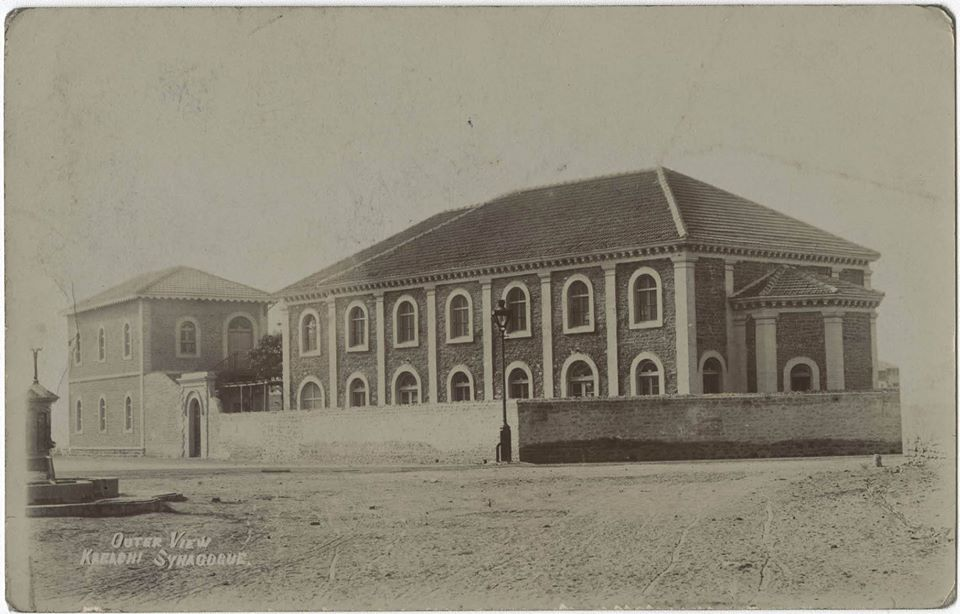
- The former synagogue in 1893

- Approximate location of the former synagogue in Sindh

Religion
- Affiliation: Judaism (former)
- Rite: Nusach Sefard
- Ecclesiastical or organisational status: Synagogue (1893–1988)
- Status: Demolished

Location
- Location: Jamila Street (Note: Formerly known as Corner Synagogue Street.) and Nishtar Road in Kalanagar, Ranchore Line, Karachi, Sindh
- Country: Pakistan
- Coordinates: 24°52′00″N 67°00′44″E

Architecture
- Completed: 1893
- Demolished: 17 July 1988

The Magain Shalome Synagogue (Urdu: مگین شلوم کنیسہ; Hebrew: בית הכנסת מגן שלום) was a former synagogue, that was located in Karachi, Pakistan.

The synagogue was built by Solomon David Umerdekar in 1893, when the region was still under crown rule as British India. (Note: Corroborated by the encryption on the gravestone of Mr. Soloman David and an interview with Mr. Emanuel Matat who was born and lived for about thirty years in Pakistan and prayed in Magen Shalom.) The synagogue was destroyed in 1988 by the orders of then President of Pakistan, Muhammad Zia-ul-Haq, following which a shopping plaza was built in its place.

== History ==
Construction of the synagogue was completed in 1893; it was further extended in 1912 by Umerdekar's two sons, Gershon Solomon Umerdekar and Rahamim Solomon Umerdekar. A community hall named "Shegulbai Hall" was built by Abraham Reuben Kamerlekar in memory of Shegulabai Solomon Umerdekar.

In 1916, the Jewish community of Karachi, British India, opened a Hebrew school on the synagogue premises, and later constructed the Nathan Abraham Hall in 1918. The synagogue had a main signboard which designated it as the "Bani Israel Masjid”, owing to the region's Muslim-dominated and Urdu-speaking society.

The synagogue soon became the centre of a small but vibrant Jewish community, one of whose leaders, Abraham Reuben, became a councillor on the Karachi city corporation in 1936. The Partition of British India along religious lines between Hindus and Muslims in August 1947 saw the city of Karachi fall within the borders of the new Muslim-majority state of Pakistan, following which the synagogue's front affiliation signboard was changed, designating it under the "Pakistan Bene Israel Community". Less than a year later, the synagogue was attacked and set on fire by Muslim rioters following the 1948 Declaration of Independence of the State of Israel. During this time, several Jews all over Pakistan were attacked, eventually driving parts of the community to flee to neighboring India. However, the frequency of attacks on Jews in Pakistan increased after each of the Arab−Israeli Wars in 1948, 1956, 1967 and 1973. By the early 1970s, the Pakistani Jewish community had largely left for Israel or India due to the Jewish exodus from Muslim states, effectively rendering the synagogue to be largely dormant.

On 17 July 1988, the synagogue was demolished and eventually replaced by a shopping plaza (Madiha Square) in the Ranchore Line neighborhood of southern Karachi.

== Post-demolition extractions ==
In 1989, the original ark and podium were reportedly stored by a non-Jew in Karachi, while a Torah scroll case was taken by a Jewish American woman to the United States. In 2004, she donated the synagogue's registers covering the period of 1961–1976 to the Israeli Ben-Zvi Institute in Jerusalem. In these ledgers, a circumcision was recorded in 1963, and several weddings in 1963–64. In 1973, only 15 names were written down, of whom nine were listed as "left Karachi".

== Gallery ==
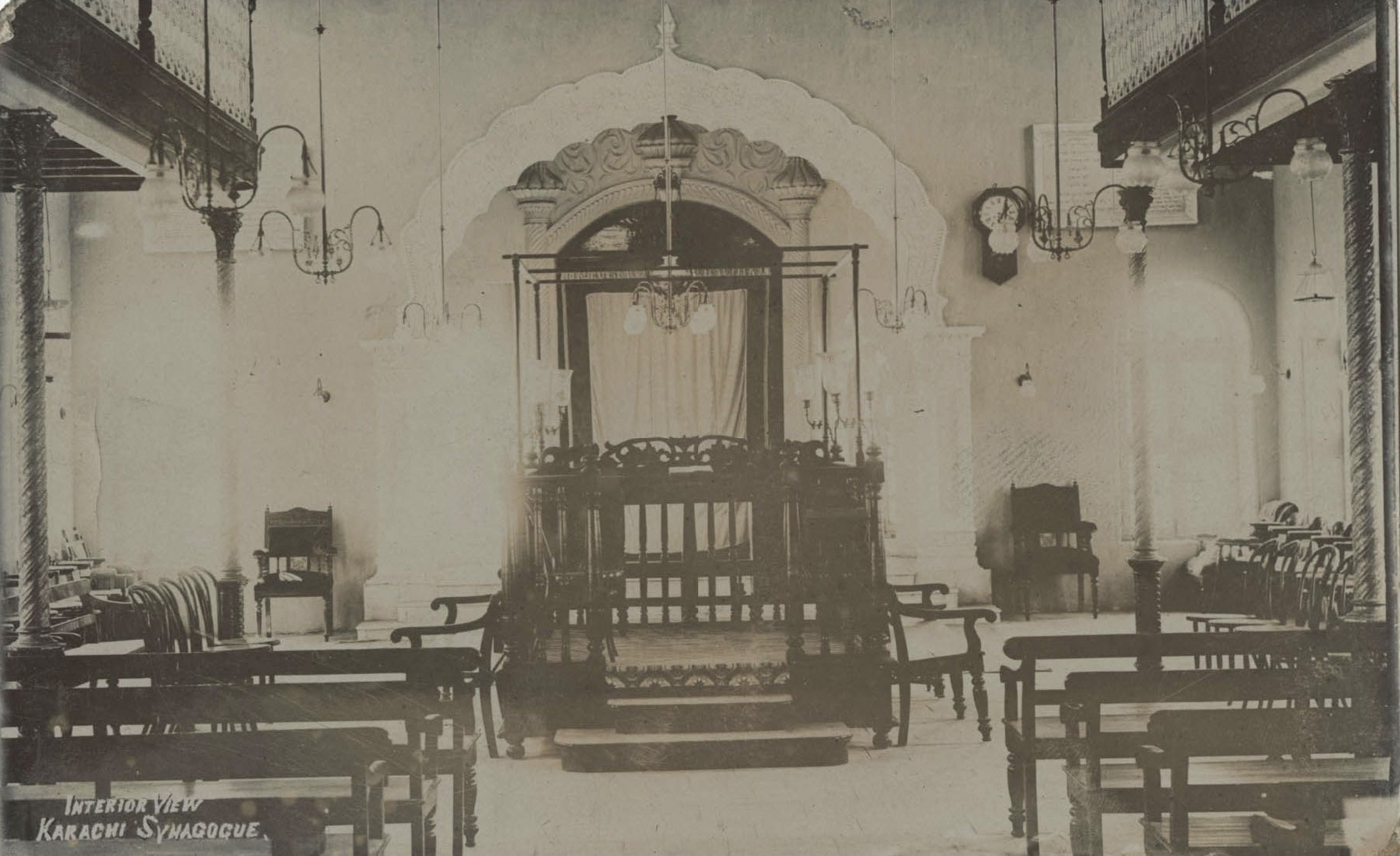
Interior of the synagogue, c. 1940s

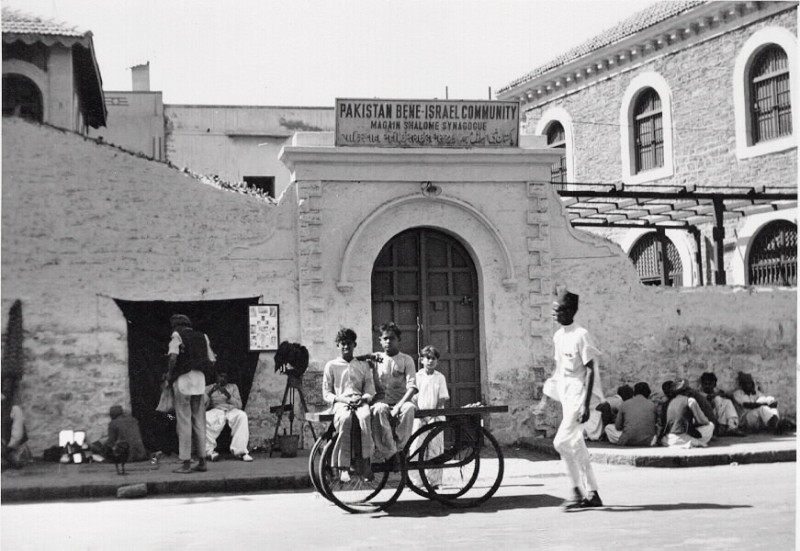
Synagogue entrance, c. 1951

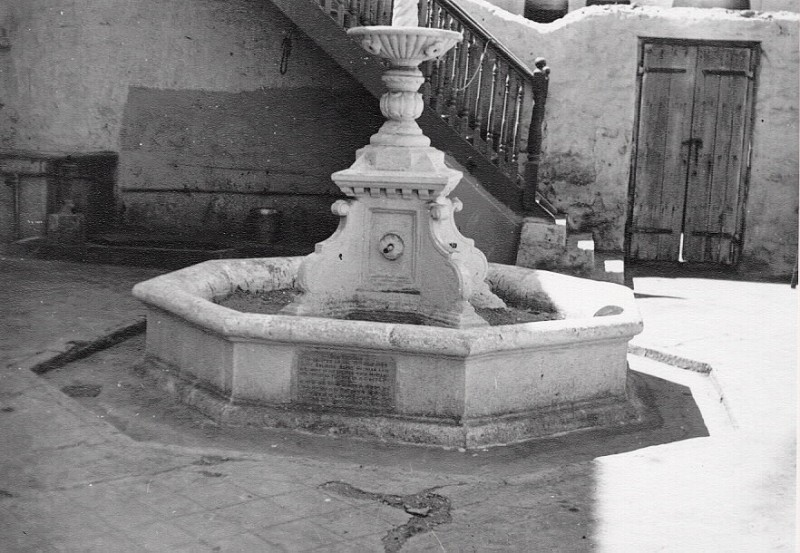
Courtyard fountain, c. 1951

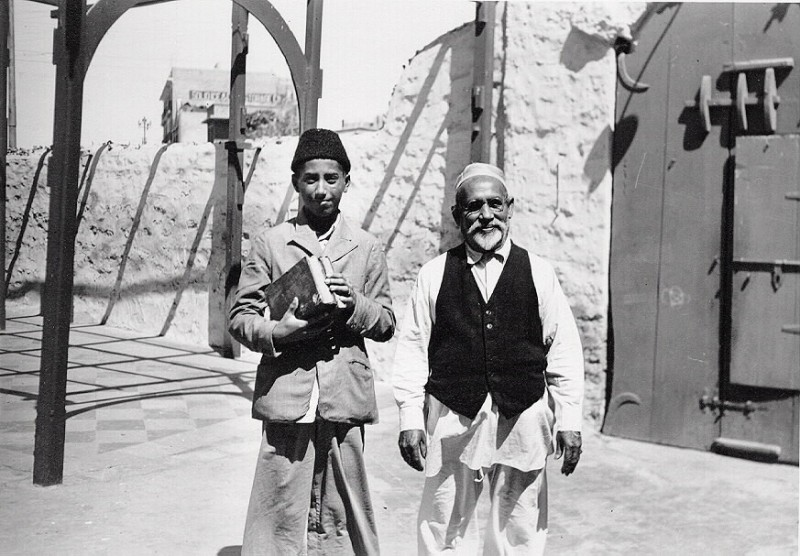
The synagogue's rabbi, photographed with his son, c. 1951

== See also ==
- History of the Jews in Pakistan
- Antisemitism in Pakistan
- Pakistani Jews in Israel
