= Bani Israel Graveyard =

Jewish cemetery in Karachi, Pakistan

- بنی اسرائیل کا قبرستان
- Interactive map of Bani Israel Graveyard

Details
- Location: Taj-ul-Awliyah Rd, Golimar, Karachi
- Country: Pakistan
- Coordinates: 24.8842°N 67.0139°E
- No. of graves: 5,000

The Bani Israel Graveyard is the only Jewish cemetery in Karachi, Sindh, Pakistan. This cemetery is a part of the larger Mewa Shah Graveyard. Over the years, the area has been reduced. The graveyard currently holds about 5,000 graves.

In his book Karachi Tareekh Ke Aaeene Mein (Karachi in the Mirror of History), Muhammad Usman Damohi writes that the Jews only had one cemetery in Karachi, located south-east of the Haji Camp area. It was called the Bani Israel Cemetery. In her book Malika-e-Mashriq (Queen of the East), Mehmooda Rizwiya writes that the Old Jewish Cemetery is adjacent to Usmanabad and is in the south-east of the Haji Camp.

== Notable burials ==
- Solomon David, an official of the Karachi Municipal Corporation and according to some the builder of the Magain Shalome Synagogue

== See also ==
- List of cemeteries in Karachi
