= Parsi Cemetery =

Cemetery in Rawalpindi, Pakistan

Parsi Cemetery, Rawalpindi
- پارسی قبرستان
- Interactive map of Parsi Cemetery, Rawalpindi

Details
- Established: January 1898
- Location: Murree Road, Kartar Pura, Rawalpindi, Punjab, Pakistan
- Coordinates: 33.6250°N 73.0637°E
- Type: Zoroastrian cemetery
- Owned by: Rawalpindi Parsi community
- Size: 0.6 acre
- No. of graves: 100+

Parsi Cemetery, also known as Zoroastrian cemetery, is a Zoroastrian graveyard situated behind the New Jewellery Market on Murree Road in Rawalpindi, Pakistan.

== History ==
Constructed in the 1890s, the Parsi graveyard was established to honor the memory of Rawalpindi Parsi merchants Seth Jahangiriji Framji Jussawala and Seth Jamasji Hormasji Bogha. Their respective grandsons, Seth Dorabji Cowasji Jussawala and Seth Nasarwanji Jehangiriji BoghaShahshai, erected the cemetery, buildings, and compound wall in January 1898.

Prior to the partition of India, Rawalpindi was a religiously diverse city with a significant Zoroastrian minority that arrived in the 1870s. Parsi merchants were drawn to Rawalpindi due to its strategic position as a major business hub and gateway to the North. The marble tombstones in the graveyard, featuring inscriptions in Gujarati script, reflect the Gujarati origins of Rawalpindi's Parsi community.

== Notable burials ==
- Peshotan Bhandara, a member of Parliament
- Minocher Bhandara, a member of Parliament
