= Gul Hassan Kalmati =

Pakistani travelogue historiographer, scholar, and writer

- گُل حَسَنُ ڪَلِمَتِي
- Born: Gul Hassan; 5 July 1957; Arzi Baloch Village, Karachi, Sindh
- Died: 17 May 2023 (aged 66); Karachi, Sindh
- Occupation: Author
- Children: 1(one daughter)
- Writing career
- Subject: History
- Notable work: Karachi Sindh Ji Marvi (Karachi Marvi of Sindh)
- Movement: Progressive
- Website: gulhassan.com

Gul Hassan Kalmati (Sindhi: گُل حَسَنُ ڪَلِمَتِي; 5 July 1957 – 17 May 2023) was a Pakistani travelogue historiographer, scholar, and writer from Sindh. He was well-known as a 'people's historian' who wrote extensively on the history and culture of Karachi and its pioneers. He was also a social activist, and strived for the rights of the indigenous people of Sindh against land grabbing and development projects.

== Early life and education ==
Gul Hassan Kalmati was born on 5 July 1957 at Gadap Town, Arzi Baloch village in Karachi. He had eight siblings.

He earned a Bachelor of Arts degree in 1978 from Sindh Muslim Arts and Commerce College Karachi and in 1983, he obtained a Masters in Journalism. He later also received a M.A. degree in Sindhi Literature from the University of Karachi.

== Career ==
Kalmati was a schoolteacher in Lyari. Later on, he was an employee of the local government department in Sindh government.

== Literary work ==
Kalmati wrote more than 11 books in Sindhi, English and Urdu on various topics, including:

- Karachi Sindh Ji Marvi. (Karachi Glory of the East), a comprehensive history of Karachi from ancient times to the present day
- Karachi Ja Lafani Kirdar - Immortal Characters of Karachi
- Karachi Jon Rehaishi Scheemon -(The effect of Urban Construction on Women’s livelihood).
- Coastal Islands of Sindh - Charna to Jaki, a detailed study of the islands along the coast of Sindh and their ecological and cultural significance.
- Immortal Characters of Karachi (Vol-I), a biographical collection of the personalities who contributed to the development and diversity of Karachi.
- Sindhu Ji Safar Kahani (The Travel Story of Indus), a travelogue of his journey along the Indus River from its source to its delta.
- Barf Jo Dozakh (Hell of Snow), a memoir of his experience of getting stuck in snow in Chitral.

He also wrote columns and articles for various newspapers and magazines, such as Dawn, The News, Daily Ibrat, and Daily Awami Awaz. He was also associated with various social and cultural organizations, such as Sindhi Language Authority, Sindhi Adabi Board, and the Pakistan Writers Guild.

== Death ==
He died on 17 May 2023 at a local hospital in Karachi after battling liver cancer. He was 66 years old. His funeral was attended by people from Malir district and other parts of the city. He left a widow, seven sons and a daughter.
