= Dan Kiesel =

Israeli-German sports osteopath and physiotherapist

Dan Kiesel (Hebrew: דן קיזל; born 1938) is an Israeli-born German sports physiotherapist and osteopath who has worked as a trainer and physiotherapist for the national cricket teams of many countries, most notably Sri Lanka and Pakistan.

== Biography ==
Dan Kiesel is a Jew of German origin and is also a citizen of Germany. He was trained as a physiotherapist at the Assaf Harofe Hospital in Israel from 1956 to 1960. He served for three years in the Israel Defense Forces, after which he proceeded to England to work at the Epsom Hospital and the Farnham Royal Rehabilitation Centre near Windsor. He moved to Frankfurt, Germany in 1967 to study medicine while continuing to work as a physiotherapist. He earned his degree in osteopathy from the London College of Osteopathic Medicine.

== Physiotherapy career ==
While studying acupuncture in Sri Lanka, Kiesel treated Australian fast-bowler Dennis Lillee, who recommended Kiesel to the Sri Lankan cricket board. Kiesel served as the physiotherapist for the Sri Lanka national cricket team from 1993 to 1995.

After falling out with the Sri Lankan cricket board, Keisel accepted a job offer from the Pakistan Cricket Board. He was appointed physiotherapist for the Pakistan cricket team, in which capacity he served until 1999. His appointment brought some controversy; Pakistani politicians unsuccessfully objected to the hiring of an Israeli Jew in the Senate of Pakistan.

Kiesel deposed before the Justice Qayyum Commission regarding allegations of match fixing surrounding Pakistan's defeat to India in the second quarter-final of the 1996 Cricket World Cup in Bengaluru. Questioned about the injury of Pakistan captain Wasim Akram, which resulted in Akram pulling out of the match on the day of the match, Kiesel confirmed that Akram was injured and had been treated with anti-inflammatory drugs. However, Kiesel said that Akram himself had to decide about his fitness to play in the match. According to Kiesel, Akram had been confident of playing on the day before the match.

He resigned in December 1998 citing personal reasons, but also differences with the then-coach Javed Miandad, who he claimed was interfering with his work. However, Kiesel continued to work with the team throughout the 1999 Cricket World Cup.

During the time he lived in Lahore with his wife, Kiesel claimed that he never hid his Israeli identity and that despite his appointment raising some questions in the parliament, he never encountered any problems.

After his tenure with Pakistan, Kiesel continued to work as a physiotherapist and trainer for the cricket teams of Israel and U.A.E. From 2004 to 2010, Kiesel worked chiefly with the Canadian cricket team.
