= List of cemeteries in Karachi =

In (Urdu: قبرستان) is graveyard or cemetery. Qabar means grave. There are total 203 graveyards in Karachi. Of them, 184 are for Muslims and 19 for non-Muslims. 90 fall under the control of City District Government Karachi, while 106 are looked after by societies such as the DHA, PQA, CAA and Steel Mills.

== List of cemeteries in Karachi ==
=== Historical ===
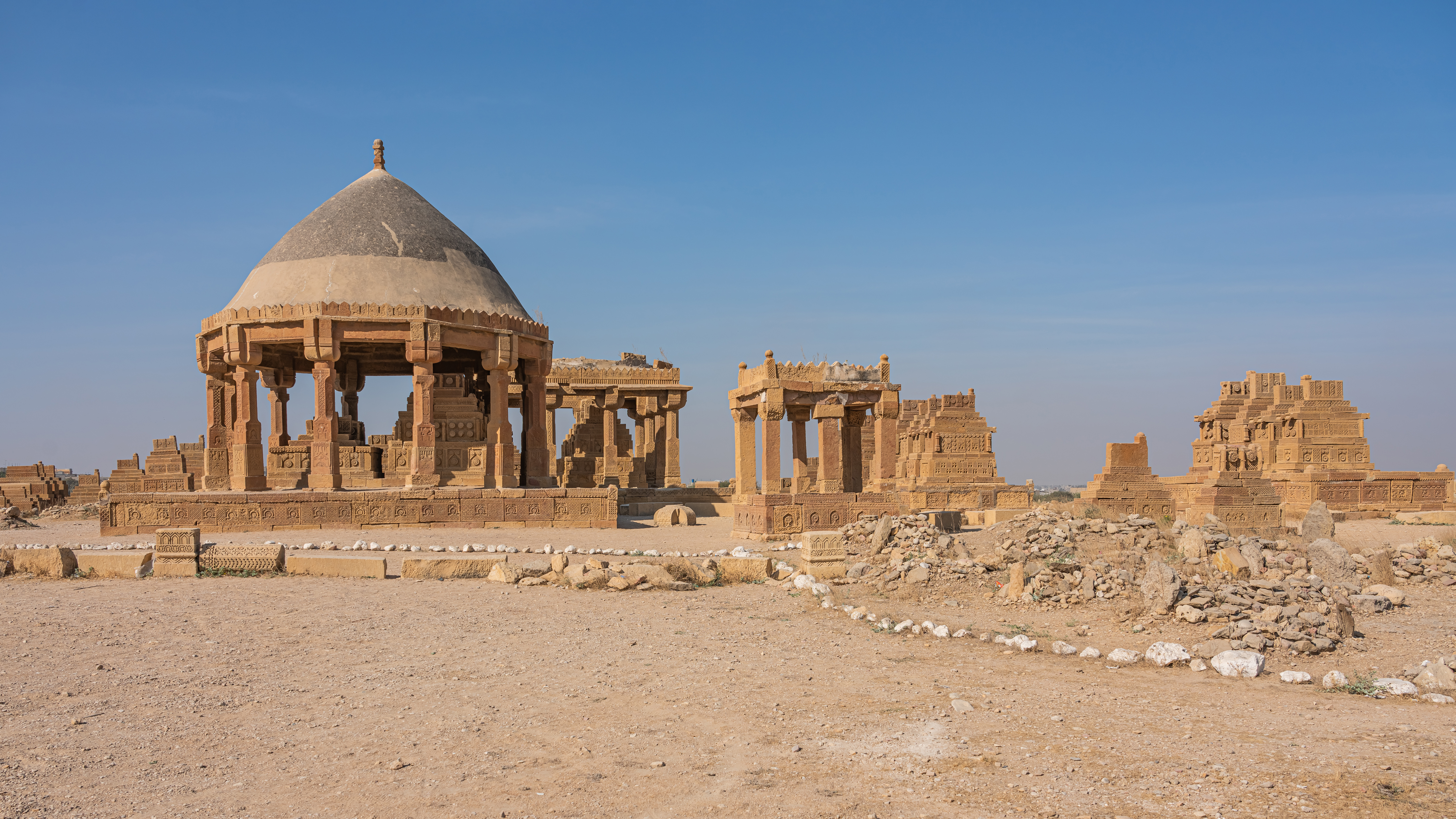
Graves and Tombs at Chaukundi

- Chaukhandi Tombs
- Karachi War Cemetery

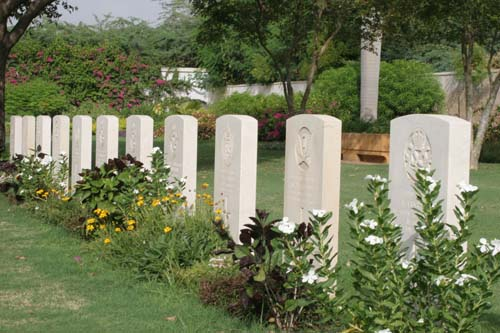
KWGC Cemetery Karachi 2005

=== General ===
==== Muslims ====
- C1 Area Graveyard, Liaquatabad Town
- Al Fatah Graveyard, Karachi
- Ali Bagh Graveyard, Naya Abad Liyari
- Azeemia Graveyard, Surjani Town
- Azeempura Cemetery, Shah Faisal Colony
- Azizabad Graveyard, Sector 14-C, Orangi Town
- Bagh-e-Ahmed (AMC Karachi Chapter Cemetery)
- Bangali Para Grave Yard
- Boor Bagh Qabrastan,
- Chhipa Qabrastsn, SITE Town
- Children's Graveyard, Jamshed Town
- Defence View Graveyard, Clifton Cantonment
- DHA Phase VIII Graveyard, D.H.A.
- Essa Nagri Graveyard, Main Sir Shah Suleman Road (officially declared closed)
- Fauji Qabrastan, D.H.A.
- Gizri Graveyard, D.H.A.
- Graveyard, Landhi Town
- Graveyard (University of Karachi)
- Grave Yards of Kaneez Fatima Society, Surjani Town
- Gulshan-e-Bahar Graveyard, Sector 16-C, Orangi Town
- Gulshan-e_Latif sec9, (Korangi Town
- Gulshan-e-Zia Graveyard, Sector 11½, Orangi Town
- Haji Mohd Sarbazi _Qabrastan, SITE Town
- Ibrahim Hydri Graveyard, Korangi Town
- Ismail Goth Graveyard, Landhi No.2

Jannatul Baqi Graveyard at Hub River Road, S.I.T.E.

- Jamaat-e-Gujrati Saudagaran Graveyard, Baldia Town
- Jannatul Baqi Cemetery, Hub River Road, S.I.T.E.
- Jannat-ul-Baqee Graveyard, Orangi Town
- Katchi Sonara Qabristan, Baldia Town
- Khajji Ground Graveyard, Liaquatabad Town
- Khamosh Colony Graveyard, Liaquatabad Town
- Bagh e Korangi QabristanLandhi Town
- Khoja Graveyard, Karachi
- Korangi 6 Graveyard, Korangi Town
- Khursheed Pura Graveyad,
- Leemo Goth Graveyard, Haji Leemo Goth, Gulshan-e-Iqbal
- Masoom Shah Small Graveyard, Jamshed Town
- Mahmoodabad Graveyard, Jamshed Town
- Meeran Maa Graveyard
- Metroville III Graveyard, Metroville III, Gulshan-e-Iqbal
- Mewashah Cemetery (officially declared closed)
- Mewa Shah Graveyard, Karachi
- Mian Goth Cemetery, Malir Town
- Miran Pir Graveyard, Lyari Town
- Moachh Graveyard, Baldia Town
- Model Colony Cemetery (New), Malir Town
- Model Colony Cemetery (Old), Malir Town
- Mohajir Camp Graveyard, Karachi
- Muhammad Shah Grave Yard, North Karachi
- New Graveyard, Bin Qasim Town
- New Karachi Cemetery, New Karachi
- Noorani Graveyard, Korangi Town
- Old Morraro Cemetery, S.I.T.E.
- P.E.C.H.S. Cemetery, Tariq Road (officially declared closed)
- Pakistan Steel Graveyard, Bin Qasim Town
- Paposh Nagar Graveyard (officially declared closed)
- Sakhi Hassan Cemetery, North Nazimabad (officially declared closed)
- Peer Bukhari Graveyard, Mannoo Goth, Gulshan-e-Iqbal
- Pehalwan Goth Graveyard, Pehalwan Goth, Gulistan-e-Johar
- Qabrastan No.5, Bin Qasim Town
- Qasbah Colony Graveyard, North Nazimabad
- Qayyumabad Graveyard, Clifton Cantonment
- Rehri Graveyard,
- Saudabad Cemetery, Malir Town (officially declared closed)
- Shafiq Pura Graveyard - Palm Grove Baldia Town
- Shah Faisal Cemetery(Colony Gate), Shahrah-e-Faisal (officially declared closed)
- Shanti Nagar Graveyard, Dalmia Road, Shanti Nagar
- Sindhi, Graveyard, Liaquatabad Town
- Mula Bux Graveyard, Redhi Goth, Landhi Town
- Wadi-e-Hussain Cemetery, Super Highway (Wadi-e-Hussain.com)
- Zia Colony Graveyard, Orangi Town

==== Christian ====
- Azam Town Graveyard, Jamshed Town
- Christian Graveyard, Landhi Town
- Christians Cemetery, Malir Town
- Christian Cemetery, Orangi Town
- Christian Cemetery 2, Orangi Town
- Gora Qabaristan, Shahrah-e-Faisal.

==== Jewish ====
- Bani Israel Graveyard

==== Others ====
- Karachi World War 2 Cemetery Faisal Cantonment
- Naval Cemetery Faisal Cantonment

==== Zoroastrian (Parsi) ====
- Tower of Silence, Mehmoodabad

== Famous mausoleums ==
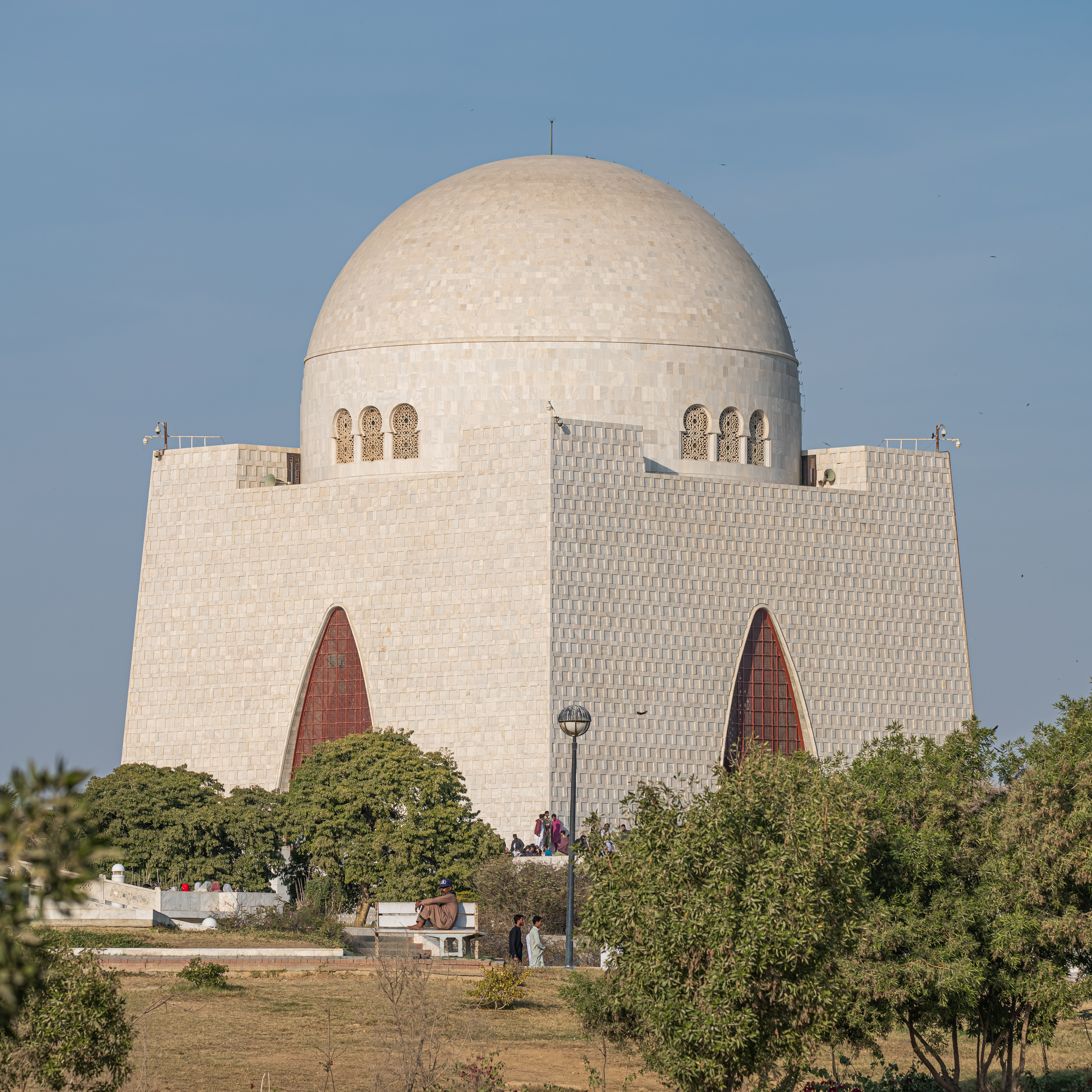
Mazar-e-Quaid – the Tomb of Jinnah; National Mausoleum of Pakistan

- Abdullah Shah Ghazi Mazar, Clifton (mausoleum of Karachi's Sufi Saint)
- Mazar-e-Quaid, M.A. Jinnah Road Final resting place of Muhammad Ali Jinnah, Founder of Pakistan.

== See also ==
- British Association for Cemeteries in South Asia
- List of cemeteries
- List of mausoleums
