= Mewa Shah Graveyard =

Cemetery in Karachi, Pakistan

- میوہ شاہ قبرستان
- Interactive map of Mewa Shah Graveyard

Details
- Location: Taj-ul-Awliyah Rd, Golimar, Karachi
- Country: Pakistan
- Coordinates: 24.8862°N 67.0115°E

Mewa Shah Graveyard (Urdu: میوە شاه قبرِستان) is located in SITE Town, Karachi, Sindh, Pakistan, and is one of the largest and oldest graveyards of Karachi. This graveyard is spread over 1,000 acres and runs alongside the Lyari River. It has the graves of Muslims, Christians, Hindus and Jews.

It is named after the 19th Century Sufi, Mewa Shah, who struggled against the British colonial rule in Karachi, British India. He was jailed and eventually exiled by the British. According to the legend, Mewa Shah climbed the ship taking him into exile, said his prayers on the waves of the Arabian Sea and mounted a large fish which took him back to the shores of Karachi.

== Notable figures ==
Kadu Makrani (real name being Qadir Baksh Rind Baloch) was executed by hanging in the Karachi Central Jail in June 1887. He was buried in Mewa Shah Graveyard. Makrani was a 19th-century insurgent who operated mainly in Kathiawar, Gujarat and was born and raised in Makran. He is famously known for opposing and resisting British rule and rule by the elite class of Gujarat in favor of the rights of the poor lower class and is considered one of the significant freedom fighters against the British Raj.
