= Elloji Shahir =

Bene Israel Poet

Elloji Nagawkar Shahir ('Elijah, the Ballad-Singer'; fl. 18th century) was a Bene Israel poet.

Born in Mumbai, British India, he was of the class of the Kalgiwallas, which is privileged to carry a plume or crest in the turban. It is said that he improvised many religious and moral poems, both in Marathi and Hindustani, in the form of ballads, and that he was invited to the court of the Peshwa at Pune to exhibit his talents.
