= Old Jewish Building, Rawalpindi =

Building in Rawalpindi, Pakistan

Old Jewish Building

General information
- Architectural style: Synagogue (19th century–c. 1960s); Residential building (since c. 1960s)
- Location: Nishtar Street, Babu Mohalla, Rawalpindi, Punjab, Pakistan
- Completed: 19th century

The Old Jewish Building is a residential building which was formerly a synagogue, located on Nishtar Street in the Babu Mohalla neighbourhood of Rawalpindi, in Punjab, Pakistan. Rawalpindi is 21 km (13 mi) south of Islamabad and the building is surrounded by a Bohra mosque, a Victorian church, and a Hindu temple. It is the only intact Jewish architecture remaining in Rawalpindi. The synagogue was constructed during the latter part of the 19th century and in use until the 1960s.

== Architecture ==
With the star of David visible on the façade, the yellowish building features bat wings and Masonic compass symbols. Its design shares similarities with a late 19th-century Indian synagogue built by Iraqi and Iranian Jews, showcasing the opulence of a prosperous class.

== See also ==
- History of the Jews in Pakistan
- List of former synagogues in Pakistan
