= Bene Israel =

Jewish community in the Indian subcontinent

בני ישראל (Hebrew) बेने इस्राएल (Marathi)
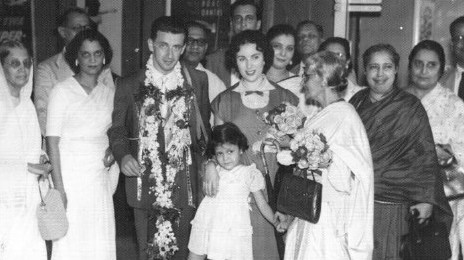
- Bene Israel wedding

Regions with significant populations
- Israel: 60–80,000
- India: 5,000

Languages
- Hebrew, Marathi, English

Religion
- Judaism

Related ethnic groups
- Cochin Jews, Paradesi Jews, Baghdadi Jews

The Bene Israel (lit. 'Sons of Israel'), also referred to as the "Shanivar Teli" (lit. 'Saturday oil-presser') or "Native Jew" caste, are a community of Jews in India. It has been suggested that they are the descendants of one of the Ten Lost Tribes via their ancestors who had settled there centuries ago. Starting in the second half of the 18th century, after they were taught about normative Sephardi Judaism, they migrated from villages in the Konkan region where they had previously lived to nearby cities throughout British India—primarily to Mumbai where their first synagogue opened in 1796 but also to Pune, Ahmedabad, and Karachi (now in Pakistan), where they gained prominent positions in the British colonial government and the Indian Army.

In the early part of the 20th century, many Bene Israel became active in the Indian film industry as actresses/actors, producers, and directors. With Indian independence in 1947 followed by the Israeli Declaration of Independence in 1948, many Bene Israel, including those who had arrived in India after their exodus from newly-independent Pakistan, soon emigrated to the State of Israel, the United States, as well as Canada and other Commonwealth countries. Emigration from India reduced the approximate population there from a peak of 20,000 in 1951 to 16,000 in 1961 and 5,500 in 1971, after which the emigration greatly declined.

== History ==
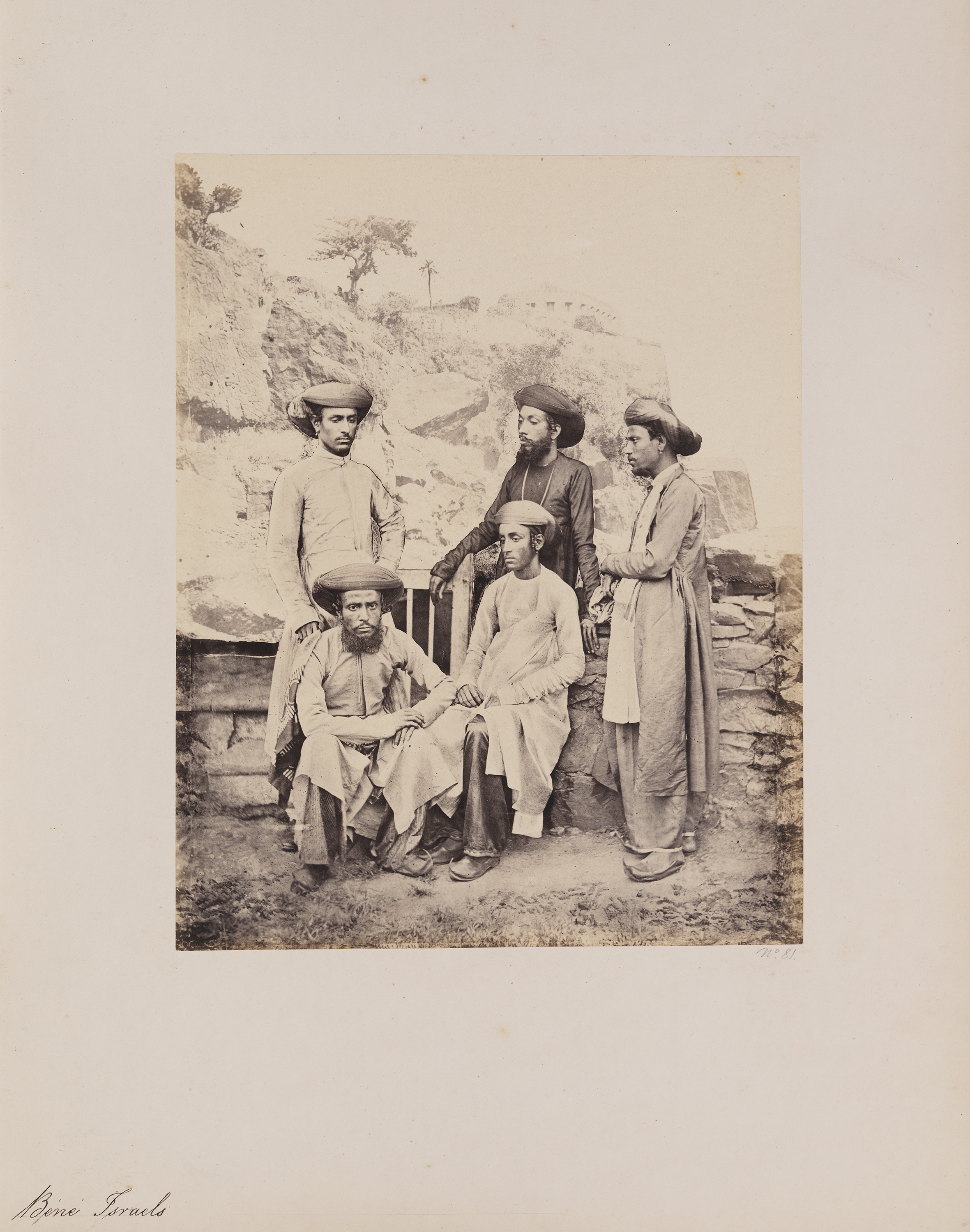
Bene Israels in 1850s.

Bene Israel teachers in Bombay, 1856

The Bene Israel community believes that their ancestors fled Judea during the persecution under Antiochus Epiphanes and are descended from fourteen Jews, seven men and seven women, who came to India as the only survivors of a shipwreck near the village of Navagaon on the coast about 20 miles (32 km) south of Mumbai. Some historians have thought their ancestors may have belonged to one of the Lost Tribes of Israel. They took up the work of oil pressing and running grocery shops but abstained from working on the Sabbath, and hence were called Shanivar Teli. Genetic evidence as of 2005 suggests that the Bene Israel appear to carry a haplotype which points to a Middle Eastern origin, and Jews may have formed part of the founding group. They gradually assimilated to the people around them, while retaining customs that are considered Jewish. The medieval Jewish philosopher Maimonides may have been referring to the Bene Israel when he wrote in a letter: "The Jews of India know nothing of the Torah, save for the Sabbath and circumcision."

At a point in history which is uncertain, an Indian Jew from Cochin named David Rahabi discovered the Bene Israel in their villages and recognized their vestigial Jewish customs. Rahabi taught the people about normative Judaism. He trained some young men among them to be the religious preceptors of the community. Known as Kajis, these men held a position that became hereditary, similar to the Cohanim. They became recognized as judges and settlers of disputes within the community.

Bene Israel tradition places Rahabi's arrival at either 1000 or 1400, although some historians have dated his arrival to the 18th century. They suggest that the "David Rahabi" of Bene Israel folklore was a man named David Ezekiel Rahabi, who lived from 1694 to 1772, and resided in Cochin, then the centre of the wealthy Malabar Jewish community. Others suggest that the reference is to David Baruch Rahabi, who arrived in Bombay from Cochin in 1825.

It is estimated that there were 6,000 Bene Israel in the 1830s; 10,000 at the turn of the 20th century; and in 1948—their peak in India—they numbered 20,000. Since that time, most of the population has emigrated to Israel. In 2020, the Jewish population in Mumbai numbered about 3,500, out of which 99% were from the Bene Israel community. Mumbai and surrounding regions, like Raigad, house several synagogues, most of which belong to the Bene Israel community.

Under British colonial rule, many Bene Israel rose to prominence in India; they were less affected by discriminatory legislation and gained prominent positions within the colonial government and the Indian Army, at a higher rate overall than their non-Jewish counterparts. Some of these enlistees with their families later immigrated to the British protectorate of Aden. In the 19th century, the Bene Israel did however meet with hostility from the newly anglicized Baghdadi Jews who considered the Bene Israel to be "Indian". They also questioned the Jewishness of the community. In response, the Bene Israel educator and historian, Haeem Samuel Kehimkar, spearheaded the defence of the Jewishness of the Bene Israel in the late 1800s. In his writings, he tried to portray the Bene Israel as a totally foreign community in India. He also divided the community into two endogamous groups: white (gora) and black (kala). He claimed the whites had pure blood, while the blacks were the progeny of Indian women and therefore impure.

In the early twentieth century, numerous Bene Israel became leaders in the new film industry in India. In addition, men worked as producers and actors: Ezra Mir (alias Edwin Myers) (1903–1993) became the first chief of Films Division of India, and Solomon Moses was head of the Bombay Film Lab Pvt Ltd from the 1940s to 1990s. Ennoch Isaac Satamkar was a film actor and assistant director to Mehboob Khan, a director of Hindi films.

Given the relatively privileged position they had held under British colonial rule, many Bene Israel prepared to leave India at independence in 1947. They believed that nationalism and the emphasis on indigenous religions would mean fewer opportunities for them. Most immigrated to the state of Israel, which was newly established in 1948 as a Jewish homeland.

== Gallery ==
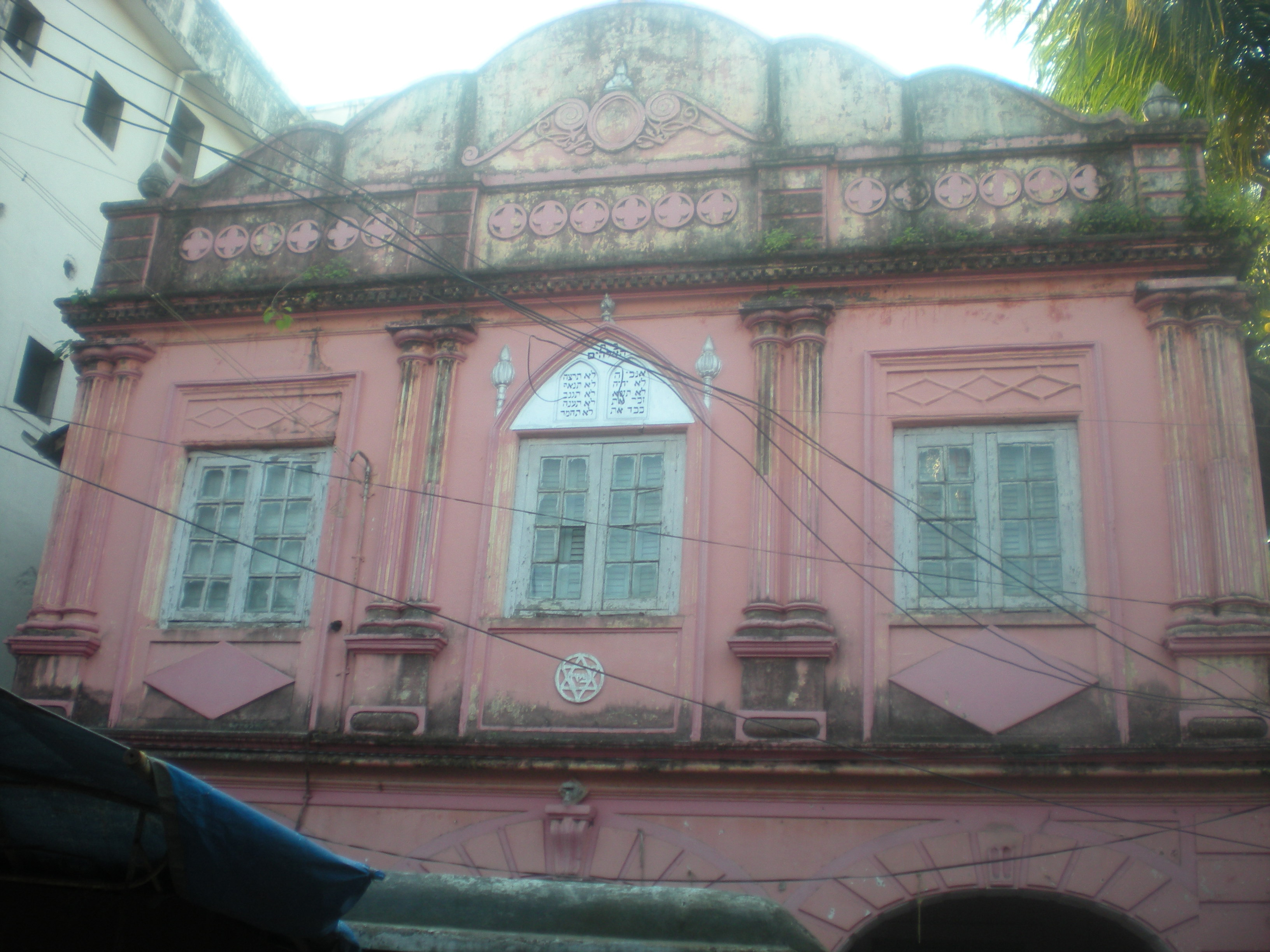
Synagogue in Pen, India

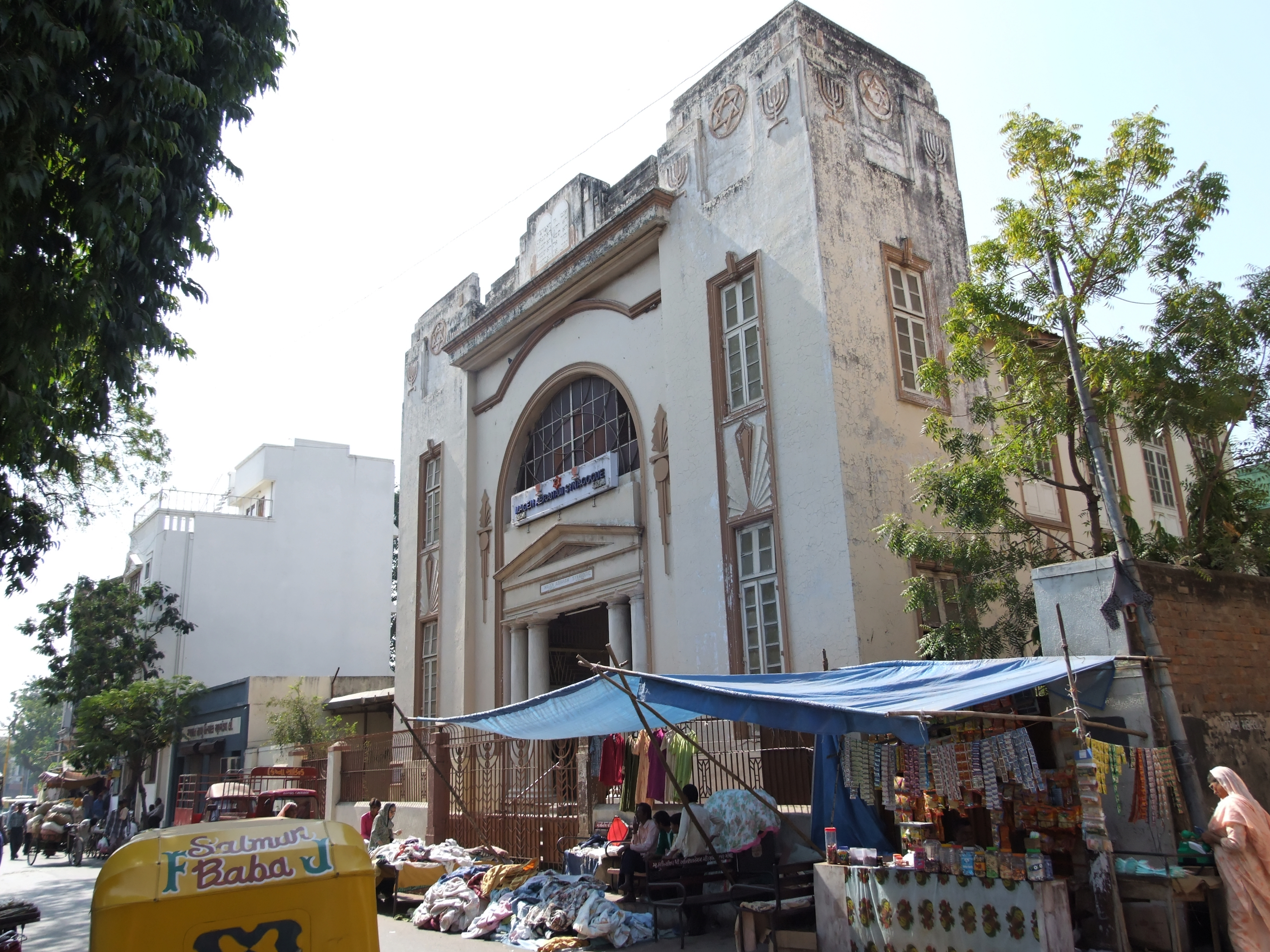
Magen Abraham Synagogue in Ahmedabad

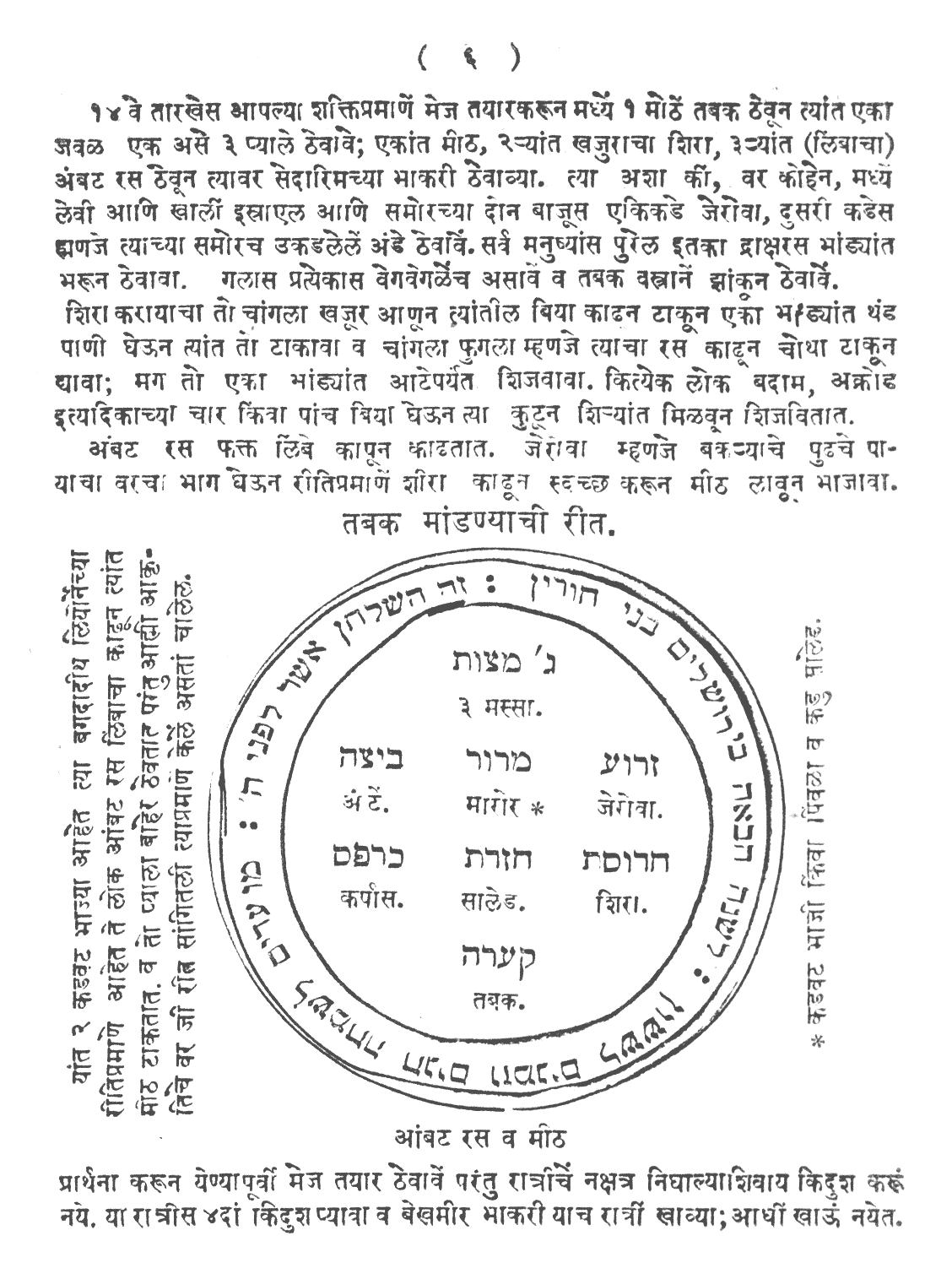
A page from a Haggada with Marathi and Hebrew text, printed in Mumbai, 1890

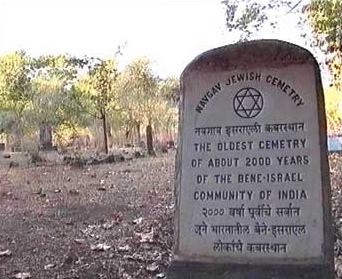
Bene Israel Cemetery, Mumbai

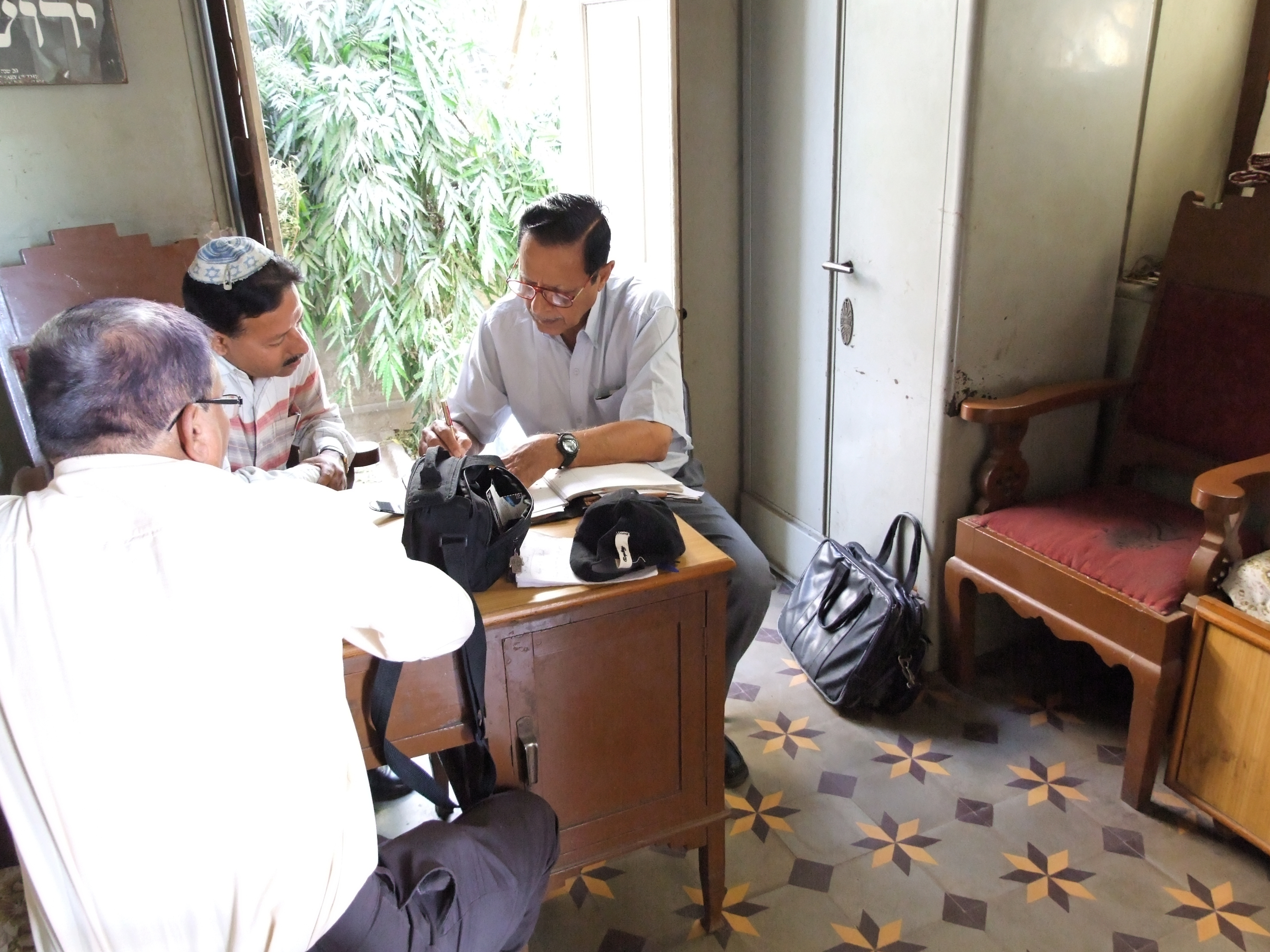
Members of the Jewish community in Madhupura, Ahmedabad

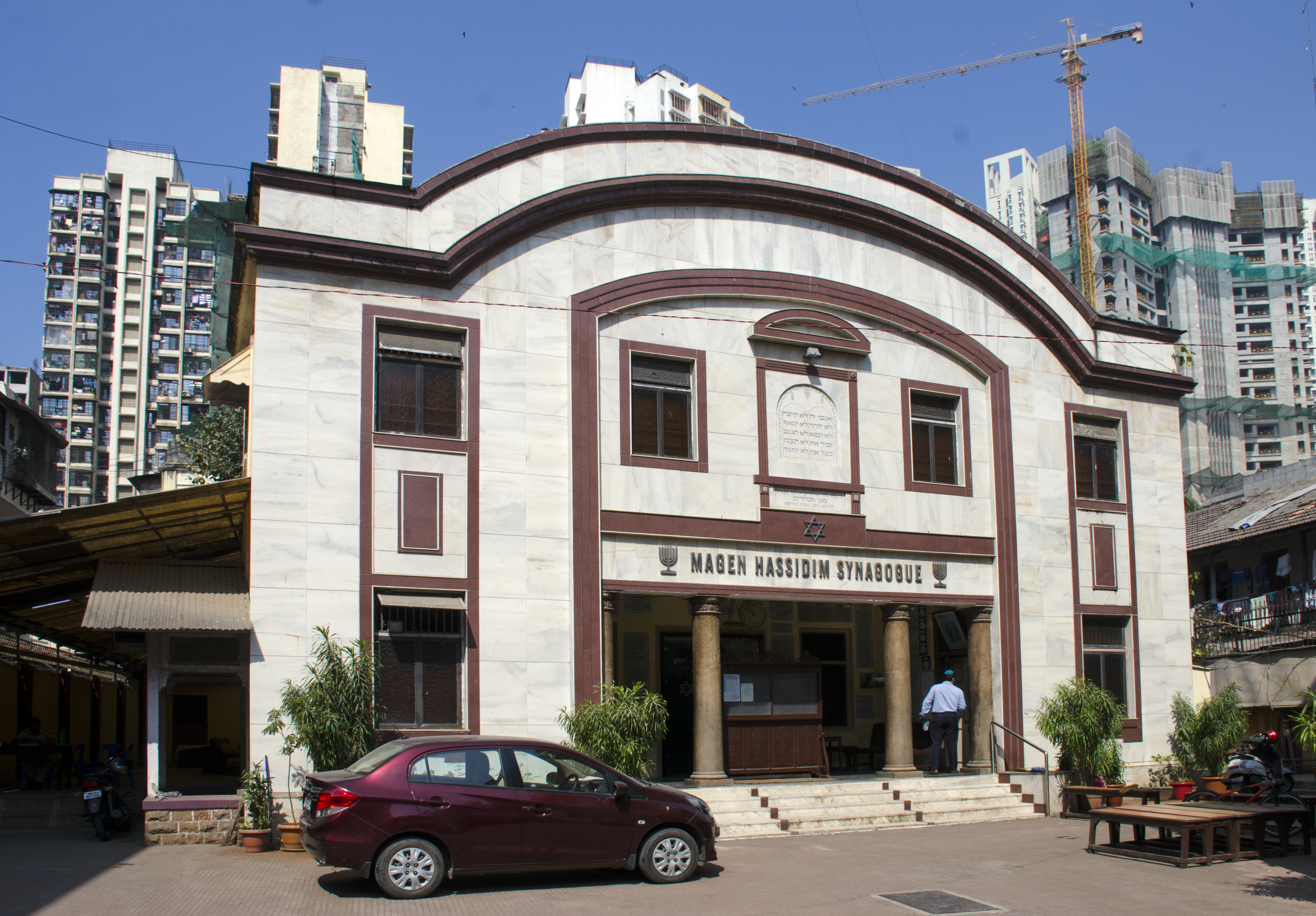
Magen Hassidim Synagogue, the largest Bene Israeli Synagogue in Mumbai

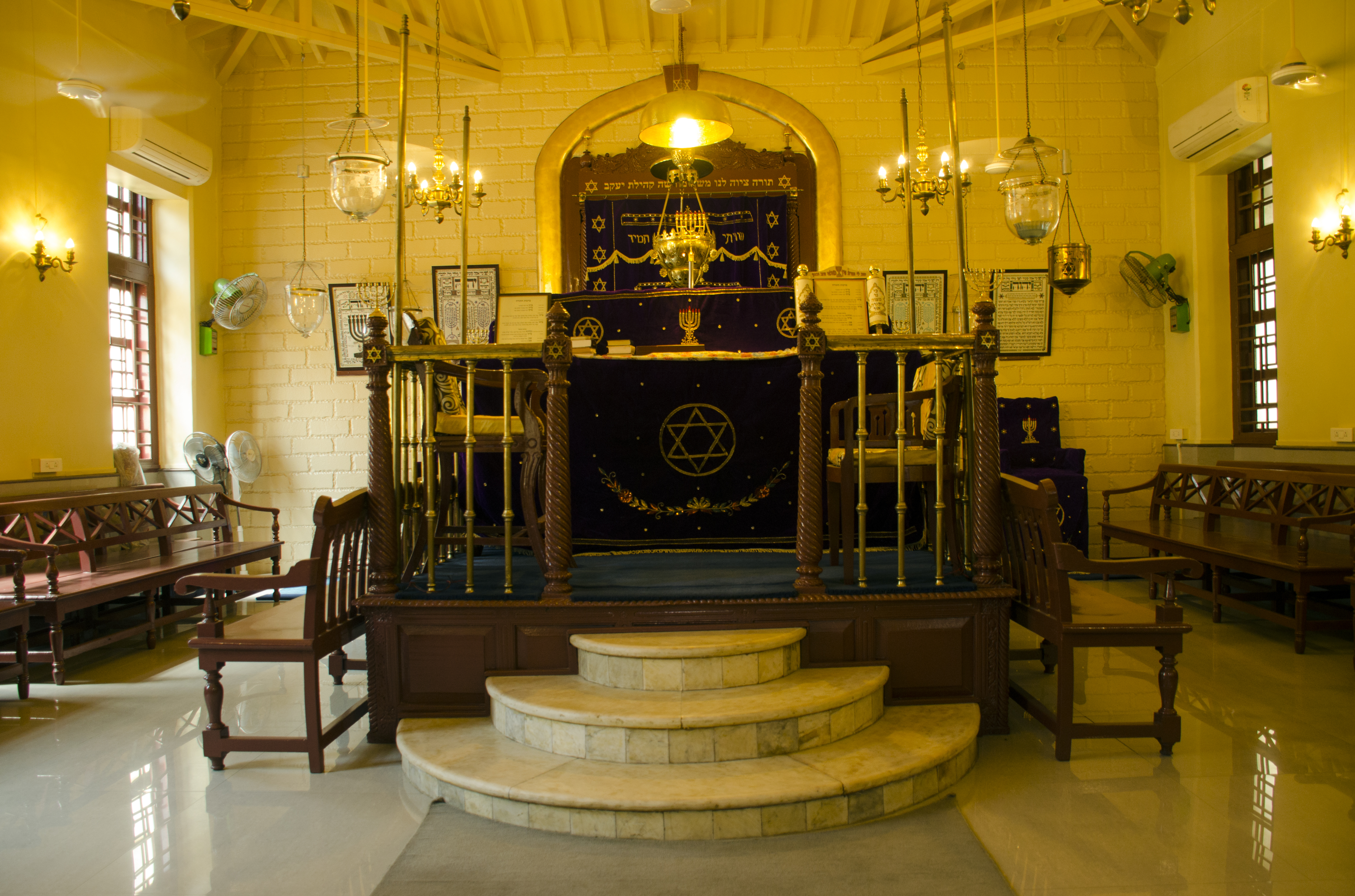
Inside the Shaare Rason Synagogue, Mumbai

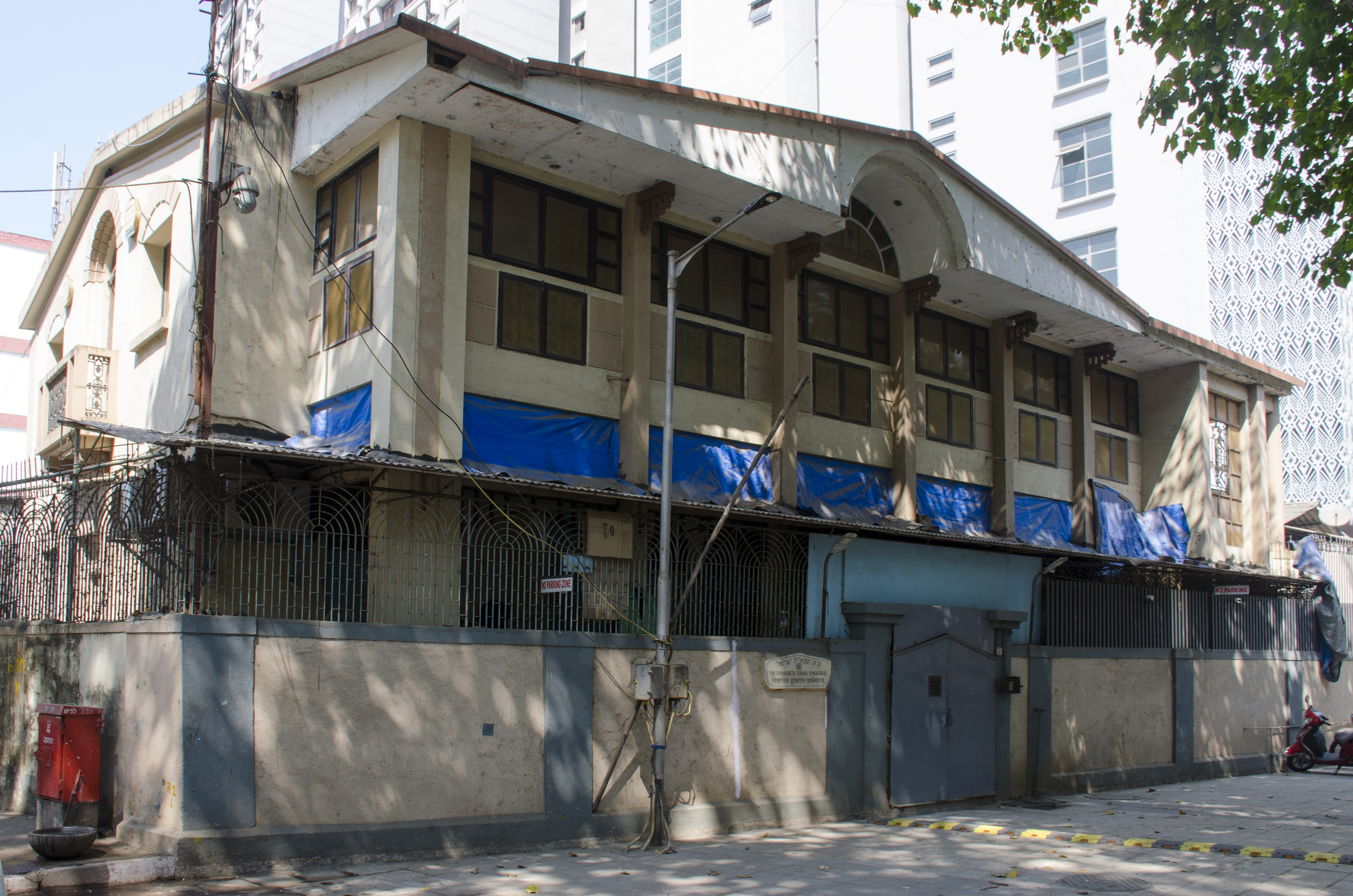
Tiphearth Israel Synagogue, Mumbai

== Life in Israel ==
Between 1948 and 1952, some 2,300 Bene Israel immigrated to Israel. In India, the Bene Israel and other Jews lived in urban areas, however in Israel they were settled into development towns. Members of the Bene Israel faced discrimination from other Jewish groups—one reason being their darker skin colour. Several rabbis refused to marry Bene Israel to other Jews, on grounds that they were not legitimate Jews under Orthodox law. Between 1952 and 1954, following sit-down protests and hunger strikes by Bene Israel demanding to be sent back to India, the Jewish Agency repatriated 337 members of the Bene Israel community to India, though most eventually returned to Israel years later.

In 1962, authorities in Israel were accused of racism towards the Bene Israel. In the case that caused the controversy, the Council of the Chief Rabbinate of Israel ruled that before registering a marriage between Indian Jews and Jews not belonging to that community, the registering rabbi should investigate the lineage of the Indian applicant for possible non-Jewish descent, and in case of doubt, require the applicant to perform conversion or immersion. This discrimination may be related to the fact that some religious authorities believed that the Bene Israel were not fully Jewish because of intermarriage during their long separation. Between 1962 and 1964, the Bene Israel community staged protests against this policy. In 1964, the Israeli Rabbinate at last ruled that the Bene Israel are "full Jews in every respect".

The Report of the High Level Commission on the Indian Diaspora (2012) reviewed life in Israel for the Bene Israel community. It noted that the city of Beersheba in Southern Israel has the largest community of Bene Israel, with a sizable one in Ramla. They have a new kind of transnational family. Generally the Bene Israel have not been politically active and have been of modest means. They have not formed continuing economic connections to India and have limited political status in Israel. Jews of Indian origin are generally regarded as Sephardic; they have become well integrated religiously within the Sephardic community in Israel. Abbink, on the other hand, states that the Bene Israel have become a distinct ethnic minority in Israel. The community, despite having been in Israel for many generations, has maintained many of their traditions from India. For example, traditional wedding rituals such as mehndi remain in practice. The Malida ceremony—a thanksgiving ritual commemorating the Jewish prophet Elijah, who has become a kind of patron saint for Bene Israel—is also still practiced. This ceremony is regarded as unique to the Bene Israel Jewish community. It is also called Eliahu HaNabi (the Hebrew name for Elijah) and is performed at weddings and other celebratory events. The ceremony features the malida food—a tray of flattened rice, grated coconut, raisins, spices, and fruit of two or more different kinds. The Community also observes Tashlich, the ceremony of taking a ritual bath at Rosh Hashanah. The Bene Israel like to attend their own synagogues to maintain group life. Their group lifestyle can be seen through their higher levels of endogamy compared to other Jewish groups.

Religiously, the Bene Israel adopted the devotional singing style Kirtan from their Marathi Hindu neighbors. A popular Kirtan is one based on the Story of Joseph. Their main traditional musical instruments are the Indian Harmonium and the Bulbul tarang.

The Central Organisation of Indian Jews in Israel (COIJI) was founded by Noah Massil.The organization has twenty chapters around Israel. Maiboli, the newsletter for the Bene Israel community is edited by Noah Masil. There is also a website called Indian Jewish Community in Israel which coordinates various cultural activities organized by the community. The community in Israel opened the museum of Indian Jewish Heritage in the town of Dimona in 2012. The museum is currently run by volunteers. At present, the museum has a small collection of items donated by the community. It also holds cultural and cooking classes for all communities.

== Migration to other countries ==
Members of Bene Israel also settled in Britain and North America, mostly in Canada.

== Notable people ==
- Reuben Dhondji Ashtumkar (1820–after 1877), Indian soldier who fought in the Indian Rebellion of 1857
- Joseph Ezekiel Rajpurkar (1834–1905), Indian writer and translator of Hebrew liturgical works into Marathi
- Rebecca Reuben Nowgaokar (1889–1957), writer and educator
- Jerusha Jhirad (1890–1984), the first female Indian Jewish physician
- Ezra Mir alias Edwin Myers (1903–1993), noted in the Guinness Book of World Records as "the producer of the largest number of documentaries and short films".
- David Abraham Cheulkar (1908–1982), actor who starred in Boot Polish (1954) and sang (on screen) "Nanhe Munne Bachche"
- Firoza Begum (born as Susan Solomon), actor in the 1920s and 1930s
- Reuben David (1912–89), zoologist, founder of Kankaria Zoo, Ahmedabad, Gujarat, father of Esther David
- Benjamin Abraham Samson (1916–2008), Indian Navy Admiral, father of Leela Samson
- Lila Erulkar (1921–2007), First Lady of Cyprus (1993–2003) and wife of Glafcos Clerides, president of the Republic of Cyprus
- Nissim Ezekiel (1924–2004), Indian poet
- Fleur Ezekiel, model and 1959 Miss World India
- Ralph Sam Haeems (1940–2005), Indian-born British criminal defence solicitor
- Samson Kehimkar (d. 2007), Indian musician
- Esther David (1945–), Indian writer and critic, daughter of Reuben David
- Leela Samson (1951–), Indian dancer, choreographer, and actress; daughter of Benjamin Abraham Samson
- Isaac David Kehimkar (1957–), Indian lepidopterist, butterfly expert based in Navi Mumbai
- Liora Itzhak Pezarkar (1974–), Israeli singer of Indian origin.
- Eban Hyams (1981–), Indian-born Australian professional basketball player
- Madhura Naik (1984–), Indian actress
- Bensiyon Songavkar (1985–), Indian cricket, silver medalist at the 2009 Maccabiah Games
- Ezekiel Isaac Malekar, Indian rabbi
- Judah Reuben Nowgaonkar (1922 - 2006), Indian cricket umpire

== See also ==
- Judaism in India
- Satamkar
- Synagogues in India
- Jews of Pakistan
