= Malida =

Dessert made with leftover flatbreads

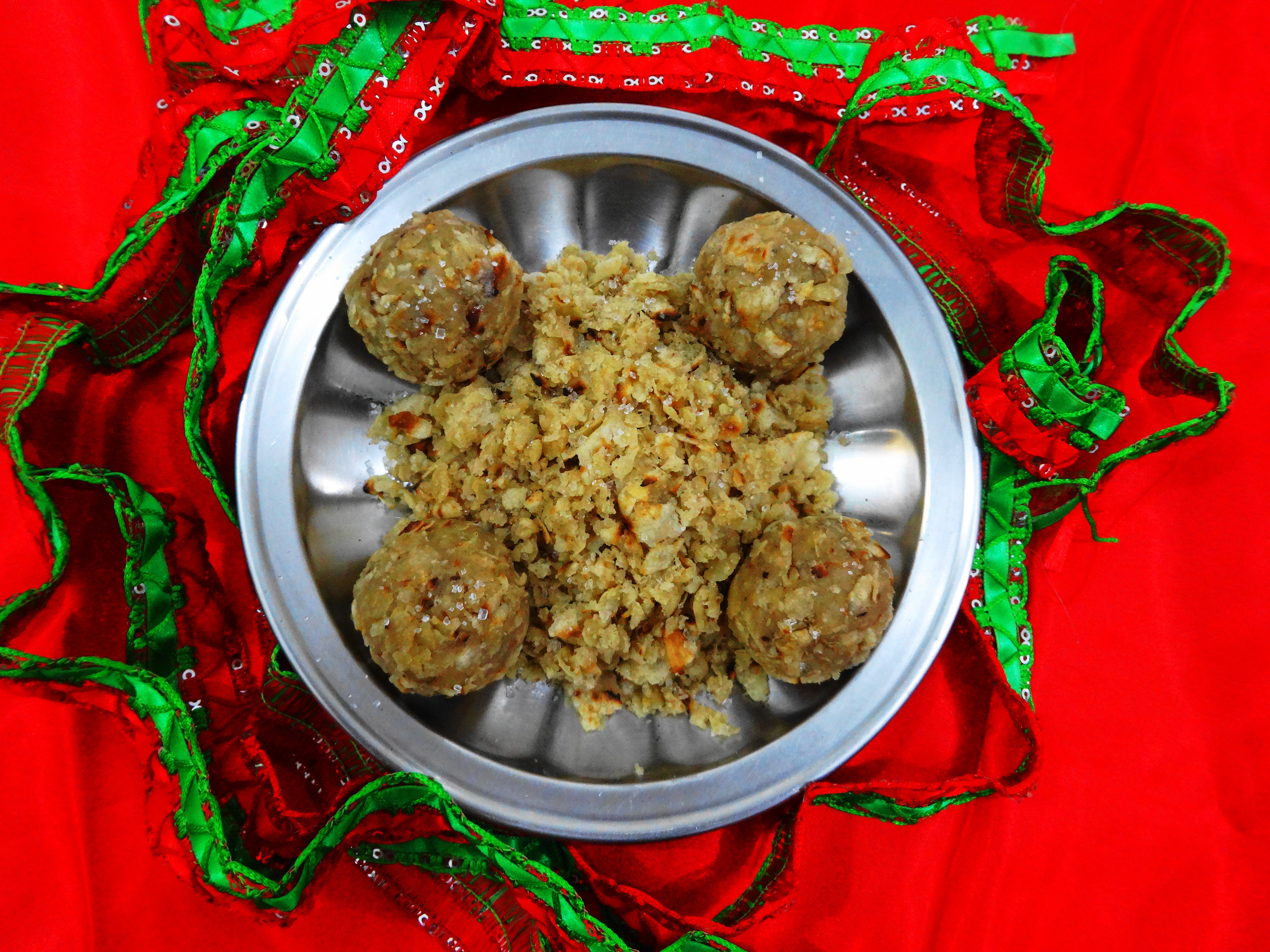
Traditional Desi Choori

Malida (Pashto 'ماليده'; alternatively spelled as Maleeda, called, Urdu: چُوری, Hindi: चूरी, or ملیدہ in Hyderabadi Urdu) is a traditional sweet dessert popular among Pashtun and Persian households in Afghanistan and Pakistan, popular among people in northern India and Pakistan, as well as Hyderabad Deccan. It is made from leftover bread (called Dodei by Pashtuns and Parathas or Rotis in desi households) that is crumbled and pounded, then stir fried with ghee, sugar, dried fruits, and nuts. Malida is often given to young children in the winter as ghee is believed to warm the body and prevent colds, and it is also a traditional dish for some Muslims on the last Wednesday of the Islamic month Safar. Malida is a common way to use up extra parathas or rotis.

== Etymology ==
The word 'malida' comes from Pashto word meaning 'fine pieces', equivalent of the Persian 'ميده' with the same meaning. The word Choori is derived from the word Choor (چُور) which means pieces, this implies that the Parathas or Rotis are broken down into smaller pieces and mixed with various other ingredients to make this sweet dish.

== Churi Roza ==
Many Muslims in the Indian subcontinent celebrate the last Wednesday of the Islamic month Safar by fasting, and breaking the fast with sweet Choori. The method is supposedly attributed to Sunnah, but almost every Islamic Sect deems it a Bid'ah (i.e. Innovation in Religion).

== Seder Eliyahu HaNavi ==
Among the Bene Israel, Malida (मलिदा) a food dish prepared with sweetened rice, fruits and nuts associated with the ceremony known as Seder Eliyahu HaNavi in honour of the prophet Elijah, who was historically revered as the protector of the Bene Israeli.

== See also ==
- Bread pudding
