= Synagogues in India =

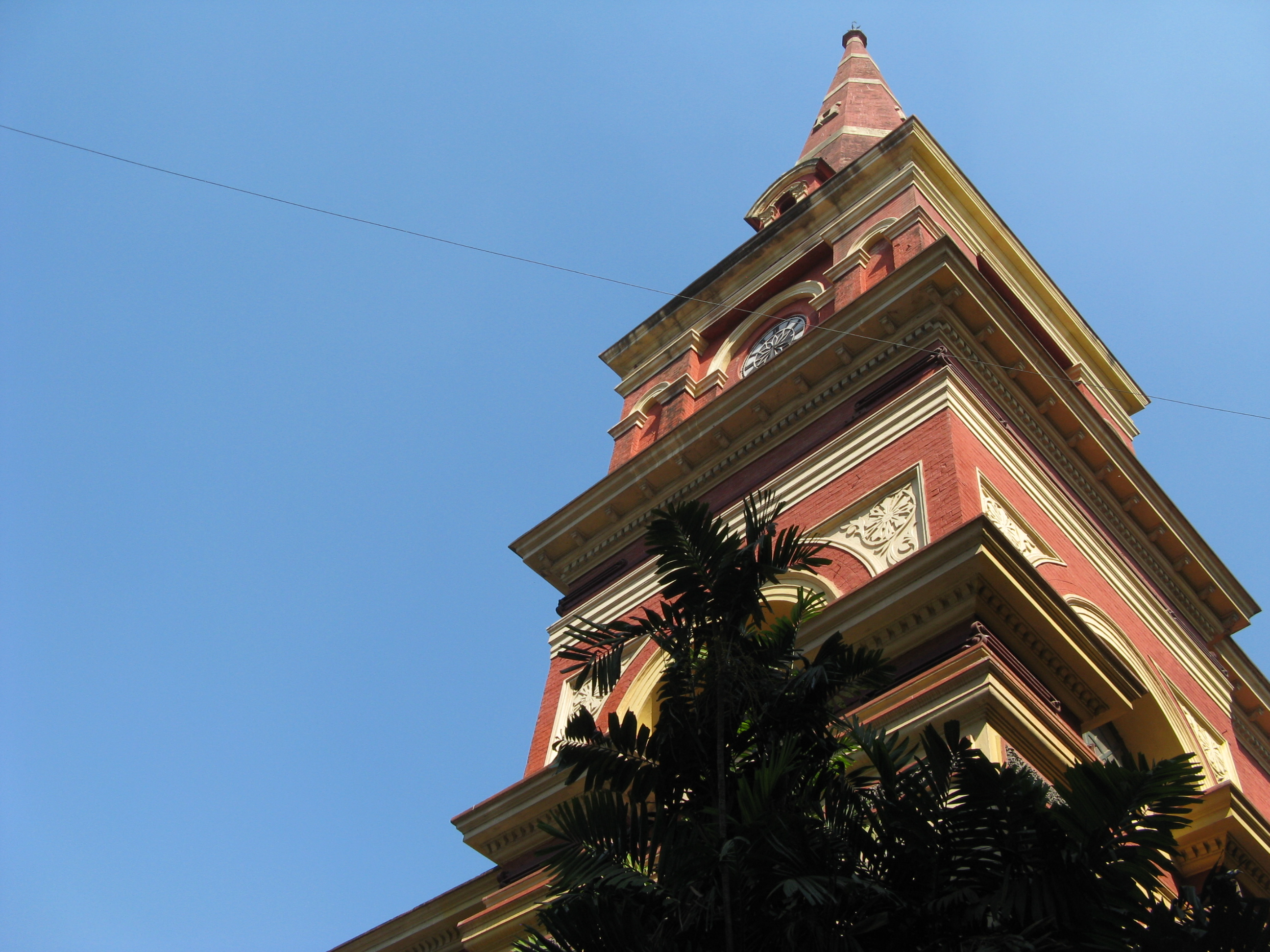
Magen David Synagogue in Kolkata

Map of Jewish communities in India. Greyed out labels indicate ancient or premodern communities

There are many synagogues in the Indian subcontinent, although many no longer function as such and today vary in their levels of preservation. These buildings dating from the mid-sixteenth through the mid-20th century once served the country's three distinct Jewish groups—the ancient Cochin Jews, and Bene Israel communities as well as the more recent Baghdadi Jews.

The Jews in India had very peaceful existence compared to Middle East and Europe where they were persecuted repeatedly. They built numerous synagogues throughout India and almost all of them exist to current day. Most of Jews in India voluntarily made Aliyah after creation of Israel but a sizable Jewish community remains who use these synagogues actively, the ones not used for praying are now museums of Indian Jewish history.

== Origins ==
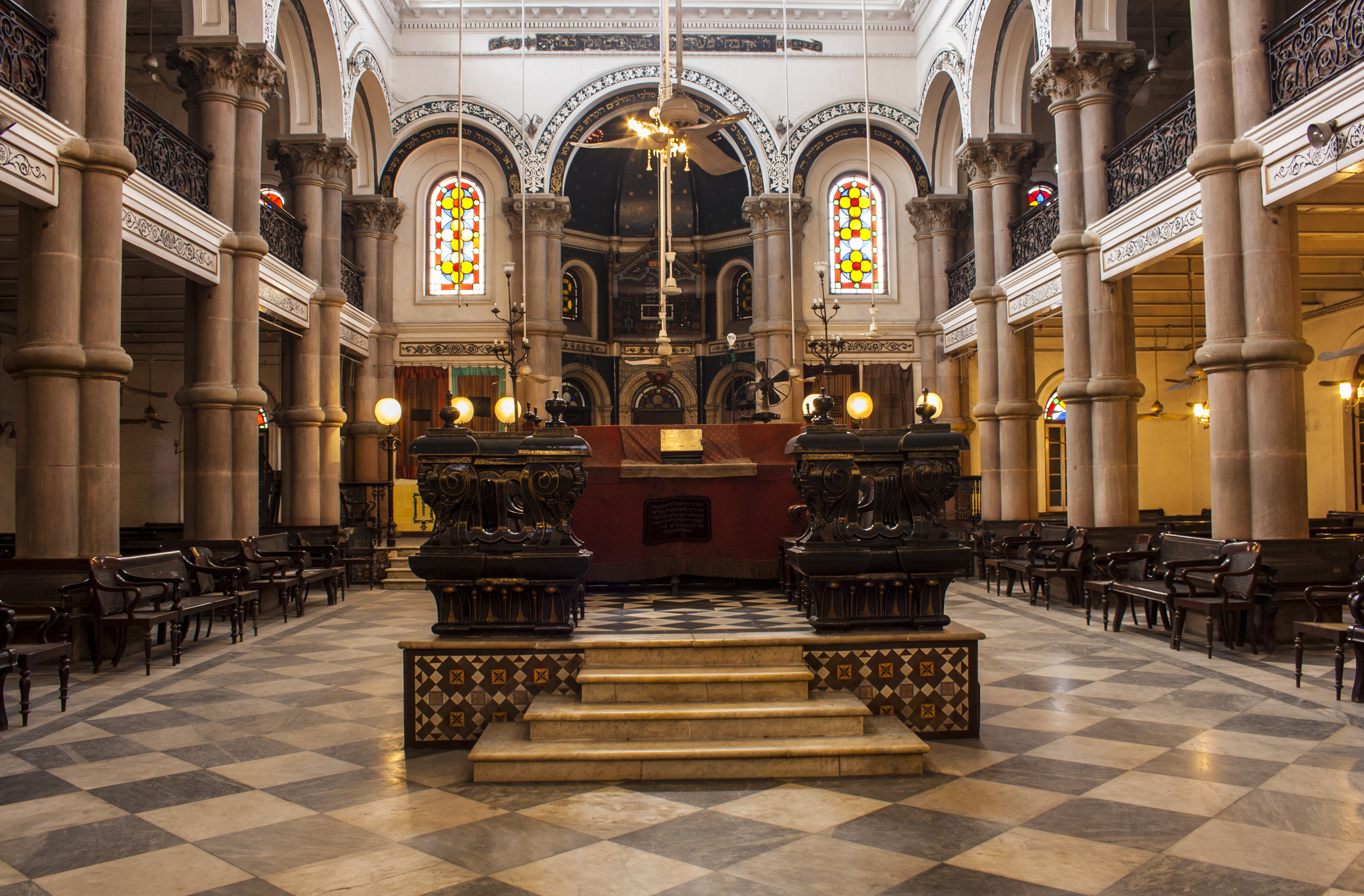
Interior of Magen David Synagogue of Kolkata

The Jews of India waited centuries to build their first synagogues, praying in temporary structures or private houses. The buildings that were eventually built vary greatly in their scale, style, and visual orientation. Some, particularly those belonging to the Baghdadi Jews based in Mumbai, Kolkata, and Pune, are grand and built in various Western styles using fine materials and elaborate detail. Constructed by the Baghdadi Jewish community who first came from Iraq, Iran, and a handful of other Near Eastern countries and settled in India permanently beginning in the 18th century is a Neo-Baroque synagogue in the Fort section of Mumbai, a Renaissance revival one in central Kolkata and, in English tradition, a neo-Gothic structure in fine condition sitting within an open site in the Camp area of Pune. The largest synagogue in Asia outside Israel is considered to be in Pune (Ohel David Synagogue).

Found within all Indian synagogues is a central bimah (platform where the religious service is led), a Sephardic Jewish tradition. Other features of Indian synagogues are free-standing wooden benches, a profusion of hanging glass and metal oil lanterns, large shuttered windows with clerestories, a chair for the circumcision ceremony and one for the prophet Elijah, and separate seating areas for men and women.

== Synagogues by type ==
=== Cochin ===
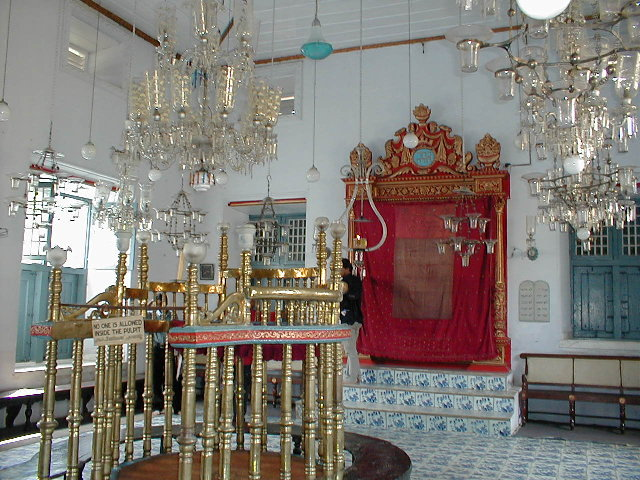
The Paradesi Synagogue in Cochin has been functioning as active synagogue since 1568

Kerala, in far south-western India, has eight remaining buildings. The Kochangadi Synagogue (1344 A.D. to 1789 A.D.) in Kochi in the Kerala, built by the Malabar Jews, is the oldest in recorded history. It was destroyed by Tipu Sultan in 1789 A.D. and was never rebuilt. An inscription tablet from this synagogue is the oldest relic from any synagogue in India. Only one, in Cochin's (Kochi) Jew Town, is a functioning house of prayer. It dates from 1568, although portions of the compound of parts were added later or altered over the years. Synagogues have rarely conformed to stylistic rules anywhere in the world or, as a building type, been resolved in unique or recognizable terms. Most of the buildings in India are no exception. In contrast are the synagogues built by the Cochin Jews of Kerala, India. Influenced by Indian building traditions coupled with the influences of visiting merchants and imperialists over the centuries, the Cochin synagogues constitute wonderful examples of the vernacular "thachusasthra" design of Kerala. Until the 16th century and the arrival of the Portuguese in India, roofs of local buildings were often bamboo framed and covered with thatched palm leaves—this technique continues to be prevalent in Kerala's villages even today. The roof system would have been set on mud walls or atop simple masonry walls that were finished in smooth veneers. In time, this construction technique was replaced with wood framed roofs (often teak) covered with flat terracotta tiles together supported by thick laterite stone walls (a local material) veneered in "chunam", a polished lime plaster. The local components were thus fused with foreign building techniques introduced by outsiders, namely the Portuguese and later the Dutch. These influences also impacted synagogue architecture and were combined with the Jewish ritual and liturgical requirements.

Cochin synagogues are unique in the world in that they feature two bimahs. The primary one can be found within the sanctuary's main level where men have always sat. The second, used during holidays and special events, is found on the gallery level adjacent to the space dedicated for women's seating.

=== Baghdadi ===
Baghdadi synagogues, some built with the support of the Sassoon family, all have particularly large Holy Arks where the Sefer Torahs are stored. From the Ark's outside, the doors appear to cover a standard-sized cabinet typical to most synagogues around the world. Once the doors are opened in Indian Baghdadi synagogues, however, a sizeable walk-in room is revealed that is ample enough to store as many as one hundred Torahs.

=== Bene Israel ===
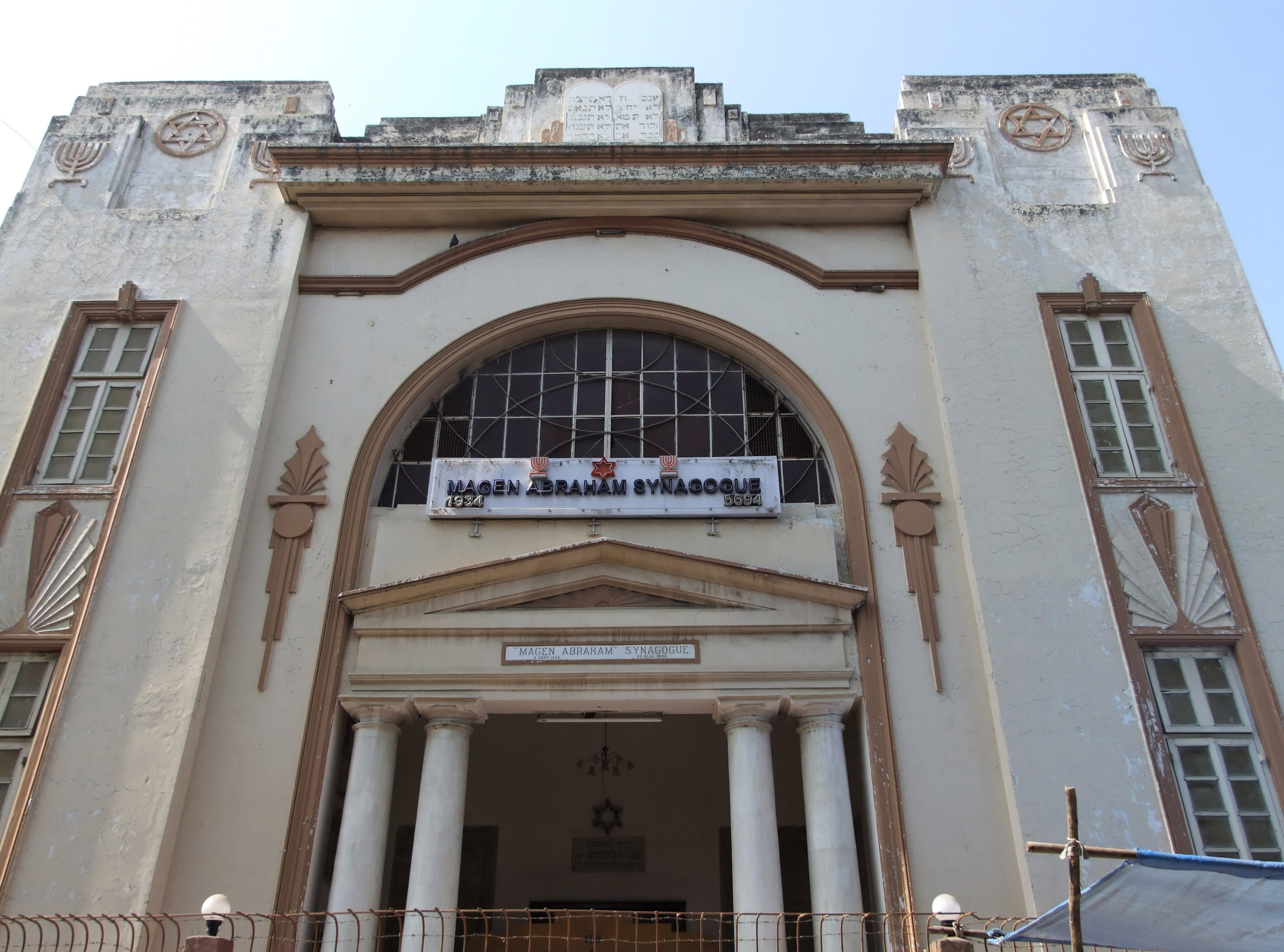
Magen Abraham Synagogue in Ahmedabad

Synagogues used by the Bene Israel Jews who settled in Mumbai, Ahmedabad, and Pune in the very late 18th to early 19th centuries tend to be smaller. Since the Bene Israel Jews were by far the largest of the three groups of Indian Jews, they built the most synagogues. The first dates from 1796 in Mumbai, although this building, Shaar HaRahamim, was rebuilt in the mid-19th century. The architecture of most Bene Israel synagogues is rarely stylistically pure and hence hard to define or label, although there are examples of buildings built in the 1930s by the Bene Israel communities of Mumbai and Ahmedabad that are pure Art Deco. A few, particularly those built by the Bene Israel Jews in the coastal Konkan Region of Maharashtra during the 19th century, are interesting blendings of colonial influences, vernacular building traditions, and Jewish liturgical requirements. At one time more than a dozen synagogues existed in these small coastal communities where communities of Jews lived, including at Pen, Alibag, Panvel and Mhasala, but today many are closed or marginally operating due to the much dwindled Jewish population.

== Synagogues by state ==
=== Gujarat ===
Magen Abraham Synagogue in Ahmedabad is the only synagogue in Gujarat.

The current Jewish population of India is likely less than 4,500. The number of Cochin Jews remaining in India is approximately 50, Baghdadi Jews number no more than a few hundred, and the balance are Bene Israel.

=== Kerala ===
==== Chendamangalam and Paravur ====
There were several Jewish communities north of Cochin, and their presence in this area goes back to at least the 11th century. Several synagogues were built over the years, two of which have recently been restored, in the towns of Chennamangalam and Pavur.

There was a Jewish presence in Chennamangalam (Chendamangalam) well before the current structure was built. Following a 17th-century plan devised by a local and tolerant leader in the town of Chennamangalam, four religious structures were built: a church, mosque, Hindu temple, and another Cochin synagogue. All still stand today, altogether rebuilt or much altered. By the turn of this century, this synagogue, which sat unused for many years with no Jews to use it, was in dire need of attention. In 2005, the Indian Department of Archaeology with funds mainly from the Department of Tourism restored the small white-washed structure. An international team made up of Professor Jay Waronker of the US, Dr. Shalva Weil of Israel, and Ms. Marian Sofaer of the USA were responsible for the planning of a permanent exhibition in the spaces of the synagogues. These highlight the history and architecture of the Chennamangalam Jewish community and other Cochin Jews. The museum, which opened in February 2006, is open daily, except Sunday.

Similarly, in the nearby town of Pavur (Paravur), the abandoned synagogue was restored and opened as a museum in 2015. The building combines Jewish tradition with Keralan vernacular architecture. In the courtyard there are a commemorative stone dating back to the construction of the current building in 1620.

=== Maharashtra ===
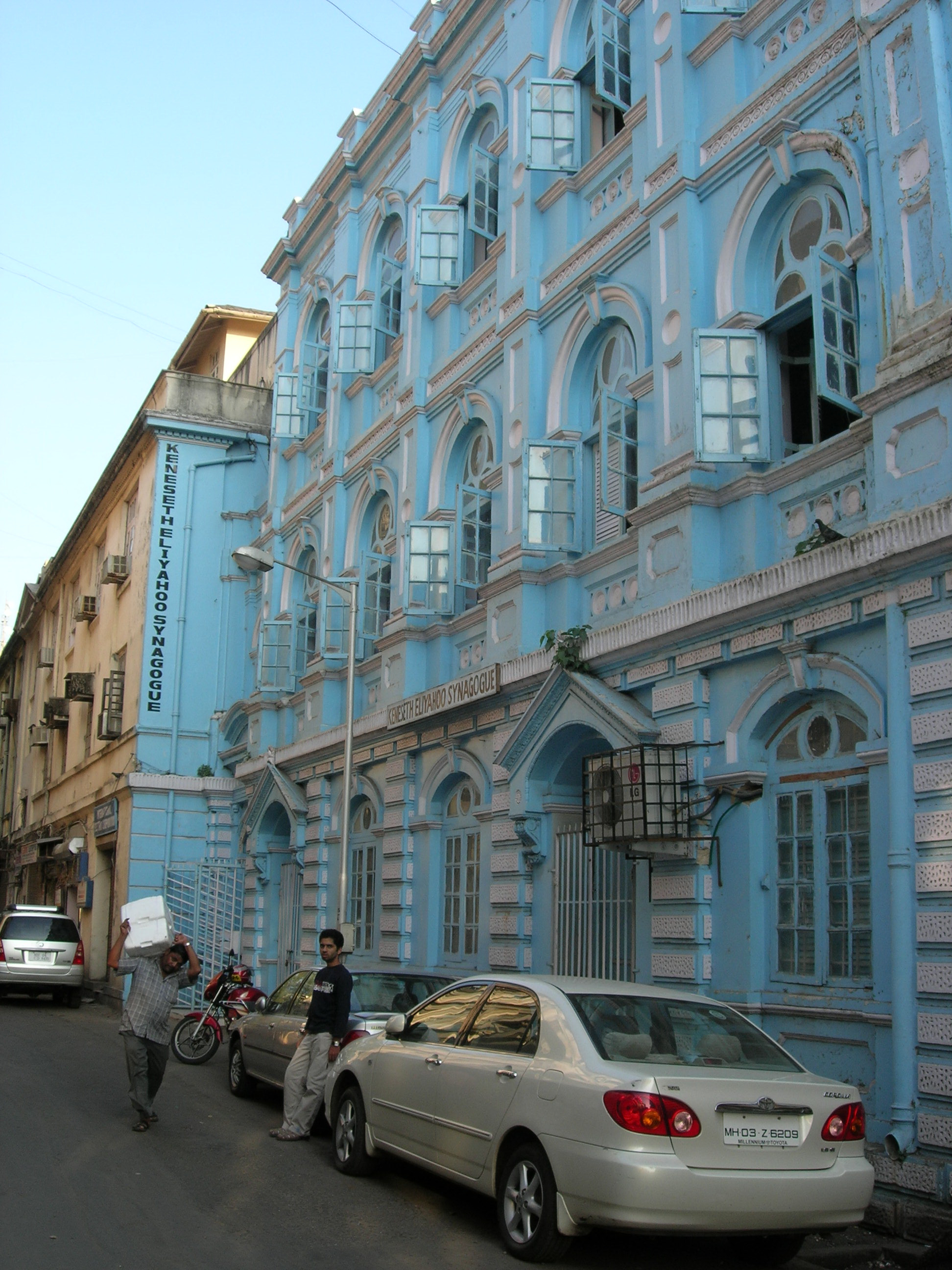
Knesset Eliyahoo synagogue in Mumbai

The state of Maharashtra has ten synagogues, particularly in Mumbai (previously called Bombay), Thane, and the neighbouring Konkan region. Bombay's oldest synagogue, the Gate of Mercy Synagogue was built in 1796. Other famous synagogues in Bombay include the Magen David Synagogue in Byculla and the Knesset Eliyahoo in Fort. Ohel David Synagogue and Succath Shelomo Synagogue are the two synagogues in Pune.

=== Tamil Nadu ===
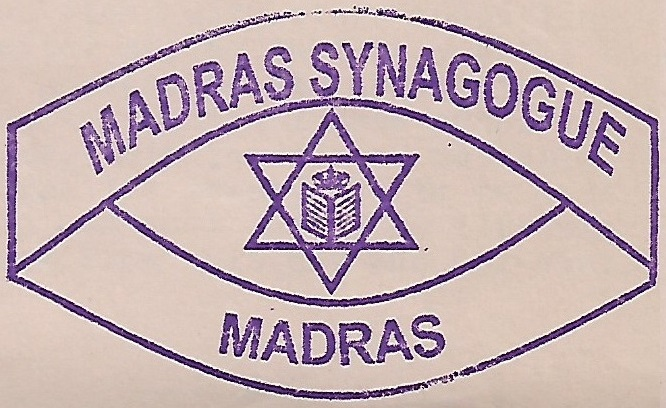
Madras Synagogue Seal

The Madras Synagogue is the only synagogue in Tamil Nadu, it was built by Jacques (Jaime) de Paiva (Pavia) a Paradesi Jew of Madras. Madras Synagogue was also known as the Esnoga, or Snoge, Esnoga is synagogue in Ladino, the traditional Judaeo-Spanish language of Sephardic Jews.

Jacques (Jaime) de Paiva (Pavia) was originally from Amsterdam Sephardic community. Jacques (Jaime) de Paiva (Pavia) came to Madras for trading in Golconda diamonds, precious stones and corals, he developed very good relations with the rulers of Golkonda and maintained trade connections to Europe.

== See also ==
- Judaism in India
- List of synagogues in India
