= Ezekiel Isaac Malekar =

Indian rabbi

Ezekiel Isaac Malekar (born: 1945) is a descendant of the Bene Israel congregation that was established in Kochi. Malekar is a Conservative Rabbi, serves as the head of the small Jewish Conservative congregation in New Delhi, India, and holds the title of "Honorary Secretary" of the "Judah Hyam Synagogue", where he volunteers. In addition to serving the local congregation, the synagogue also caters to Jewish diplomats stationed in the city, as well as Jewish tourists. Malekar has hosted several prominent figures, including former Prime Minister of Israel Shimon Peres. The Government of India recognizes him as a "Jewish Representative" and among his duties, he has recited Jewish prayers during the funeral ceremonies of major national figures, including Indira Gandhi, Rajiv Gandhi, and Sai Baba. He also participated by offering Jewish prayers at the opening of the Parliament of India on May 28, 2023.

Malekar, in addition to being a scholar of Judaism, is a human rights activist and a Deputy Registrar (Law) with the National Human Rights Commission in India. He was a key participant in the 15th International Conference on Human Integration (inaugurated by Rajinder Singh Ji Maharaj, a Sikh religious cleric and President of the World Council of Religions), at Kirpal Bagh, New Delhi on February 6, 2006.

He said:

“According to Rabbi [sic] Hillel, the Torah can be capsulated into only one commandment: ‘What is hurtful and hateful to you, do not do to another.’ Everything else is footnote.”

He is a recipient of the Mahatma Award, Mahavir Award, and the Ambassador of Peace Award.
