= Firoza Begum (actress) =

Jewish Indian actress

- Firoza Begum
- Years active: 1920s and 1930s

Firoza Begum was a Jewish Indian actress. Firoza starred in several Bollywood and Mollywood films. She was very popular in the 1920s and 1930s. Although there were other Jewish actresses at the time, she stands out along with other notables like Ruby Myers and Esther Victoria Abraham (Pramila).

Born Susan Solomon, she is of Bene Israel heritage. She used the Muslim name Firoza Begum to hide her Jewish ancestry (see History of the Jews in India). She was one of five famous Jewish Indian actresses featured in the documentary Shalom Bollywood: The Untold Story of Jews and Bollywood by Danny Ben-Moshe released in 2017.

== Filmography ==
- Bewafa Qatil
- Prem Veer
- Din Raat
- Raigad
- Bhagta Bhoot
- Circus Girl
- Noor-E-Yaman (1935)
- Ansuon Ki Duniya (1936)
- Bharat Ka Lal (1936)
