= Joseph Ezekiel Rajpurkar =

Jewish Indian writer

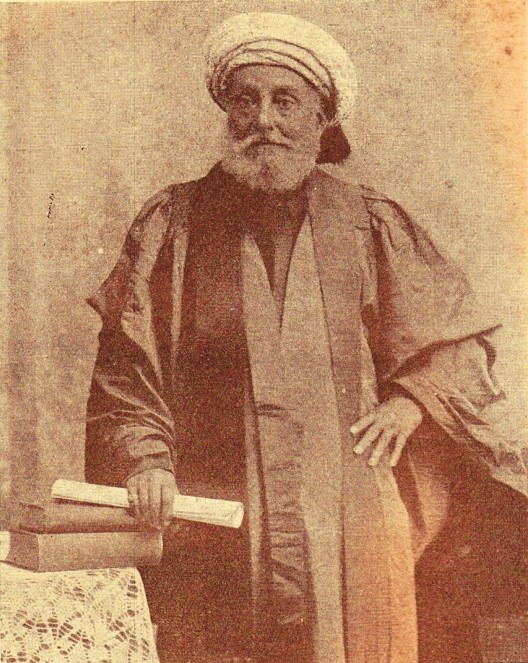
- Born: 1834; Bombay, British India
- Died: 1905 (aged 70–71); Bombay, British India

Joseph Ezekiel Rajpurkar (Marathi: जोसेफ यहेज्केल राजपूरकर, Hebrew: יוסף יחזקאל ראג׳פורכר; 1834–1905) was a Bene Israel writer and translator of Hebrew liturgical works into Marathi.

== Biography ==
Joseph Ezekiel Rajpurkar was born to a prominent Bene Israel family in Bombay in 1834. His father, Ezekiel Joseph Rajpurkar, was a teacher and superintendent of Scottish mission schools. Rajpurkar was educated in the school of the Free General Assembly by John Wilson, where he studied Hebrew, English, and other subjects. He became an assistant teacher at the David Sassoon Benevolent Institution—a school for Baghdadi Jewish children—in 1856. He was appointed headmaster five years later, a position he kept for forty years. In 1871 Rajpurkar was appointed examiner in Hebrew at the University of Bombay, and in 1879 was made a fellow of the university. He became justice of the peace in 1890.

Rajpurkar translated over twenty works of the Hebrew liturgy and many English works of Jewish interest into Marathi, and authored expositions on rabbinic literature and Jewish history. His translations include the siddur, maḥzor, piyyutim, and seliḥot, among others. In 1876 he published Israelache Dharmamattavishaye Shastrateel Pramane, a defence of Judaism's legitimacy, in an effort to avert Bene Israel from converting to Christianity. He also published Kuttonet Yosef, a handbook of Hebrew abbreviations, a Hebrew grammar in Marathi, and a Hebrew primer for children.

Aside from his work as teacher, translator, and commentator, Rajpurkar worked unceasingly for the good of the Jews in Bombay. He spearheaded Bombay Jewry's response to the blood libel charge that appeared in 1882 in the Bombay Cassid, a Gujarati-language Muslim periodical, and for many years served as Senior Warden of the Shaar ha-Raḥamim Synagogue and Secretary to the Israel Lokancha Sudronshodak Mandali (Bene Israel Improvement Society).
