= Satamkar =

Prominent Bene Israel family in India

Satamkar (also Satamker) is a Bene Israel family who lived for centuries in Kolaba (now Raigad District) in the Konkan region, India. Most members moved to Israel from the 1960s through the 1980s; some have settled elsewhere in the world.

== Origins ==
The Satamkar family has its origins in the village of Satamba/Virjoli (18.343726°N 73.092846°E), Roha taluka, Raigad district, Maharashtra, near the West Coast of India south of Mumbai. This family belongs to the Bene Israel community, one of the three groups of Indian Jews. According to tradition, ancestors of the Bene Israel were Jews who came to India about 2000 years ago, settled and married into the indigenous population. They are believed to have converted their wives or at least maintained some Jewish traditions in their families.

== Life in Kolaba ==
The Bene Israel have been living in the Kolaba (today: Raigad) District for close to eighteen centuries. The Satamkar ancestors used to dwell in villages from which they were believed to have taken their surnames (Satamkar = from Satamba (Virjoli), Penker = from the town called Pen, Ashtamkar = from the town called Ashtami, etc. ...). Satamba means, in Marathi, 'Seven Mangoes'. For centuries their principal occupation was oil pressing. They extracted oil from a kind of sesame seed called til and were known as Shaniwar Telli ("Saturday oil pressers"), because they did not work on Saturday.

== Settling throughout India ==
At the end of the 18th century and, especially during the 19th century, the men enlisted in the Army. With a tradition of literacy, they also found positions in the British colonial government, in the civil service, the railways, the Post office, Customs and Excise. From that time, they settled in all parts of India (present India and Pakistan). Many lived in Mumbai working as carpenters or contractors ('maistry').

At the beginning of the 19th century, some left their village for Mumbai, Nandgaon, Maharashtra and other places. Most members of the Satamkar family lived in Satamba/Virjoli until the 1970s.

== Emigration from India ==
Between the 1960s and the 1980s, most of the Satamkar family emigrated to Israel; many Bene Israel had already left in the 1950s. Some of them now live in the United Kingdom, the US, Canada, France, Italy, Spain, Brazil and other western countries. Some of the family still resides in India.

== People with the surname Satamkar ==
- Daniel Abraham Satamkar (known as Daniel Abraham) – Founder of "D. Abraham & Sons" Shipping Company in Mumbai ; trustee and former president of the Thane Synagogue.
- David Ezekiel Satamkar – President and Treasurer of the Ghosale & Virjoli/Satamba Bene Israel Community; he was also Representative of the Jewish Central Board in Bombay
- Hanoch Satamkar – Film actor and assistant director to Mehboob Khan, prominent director of Hindi films.
- Soloman Satamkar- Carpenter
- Nathan Soloman Satamkar – Musician.
- David Soloman Satamkar – Musician.
- Abigail David Satamkar - Music teacher
- Benjamin Nathan Satamkar – Musician.
- Shegulla Nathan Satamkar (Shegulla Elijah Kasukar)- Indian classical dancer
- Rephael David Satamkar - Musician in the Hindi film industry and percussionist
- Reena Nathan Satamkar (Reena Elijah Dighorkar)- Indian Classical Dancer
- Hananiel Nathan Satamkar – Musician in the Hindi film industry and guitarist.
- David Soloman Satamkar – Musician.
- Suzan David Satamkar (Sonali Sunil Pendse)- Sitarist and Indian classical dancer
- Daniel Rephael Satamkar - Musician and pianist

== Gallery ==
Old tombstones in the Satamkars Cemetery

Daniel Abraham Satamkar, founder of D. Abraham & sons

David Ezekiel Satamkar and his wife

== Bibliography ==
- Berry Isenberg, Shirley (1988). India's bene Israel : a comprehensive inquiry and sourcebook. Berkeley: J.L. Magnes museum. p. 443. ISBN 9780943376271. OCLC 463450932. OL 26316025M.
- Reuben, Yoel Moses (2010). The Jews of Pakistan : a Forgotten Heritage. Mumbai: Bene Israel Heritage Museum and Genealogical Research Centre. p. 250. OCLC 612432916.
- Bene Israel, Ms 654/1, Central Archives for the History of the Jewish People, Jerusalem,
