= Isaac David Kehimkar =

Indian naturalist, photographer, author and teacher

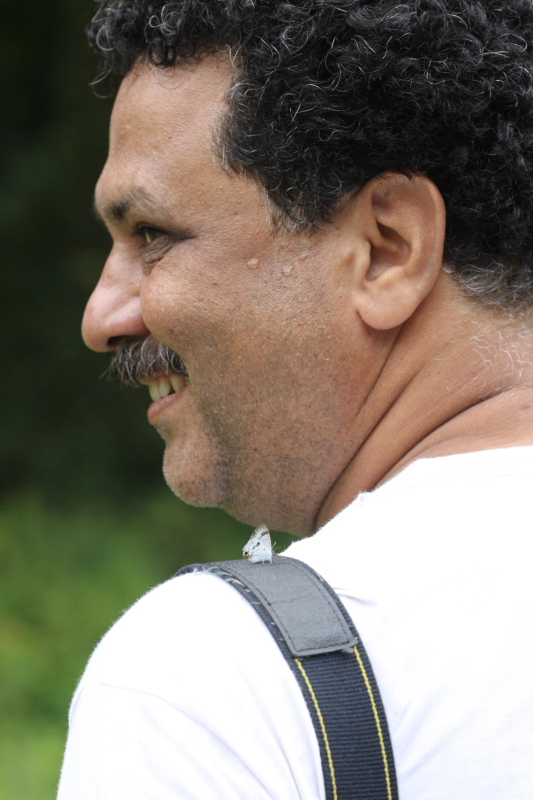
- Born: 21 May 1957
- Awards: Green Teacher Award, 2014, Sanctuary Asia; Kirloskar Vasundhara Award, 2015.
- Scientific career
- Fields: Lepidopterist; Natural history
- Workplaces: Bombay Natural History Society

Isaac David Kehimkar is an Indian naturalist, photographer, author and teacher. He is the author of the field guides The Book of Indian Butterflies, published by Bombay Natural History Society, and Butterflies of India.

In 2017, he joined iNaturewatch foundation.
