= Magen Abraham Synagogue =

Synagogue in Ahmedabad, India

- Hebrew: בית הכנסת מגן אברהם; Gujarati: મેગન અબ્રાહમ સિનાગોગ
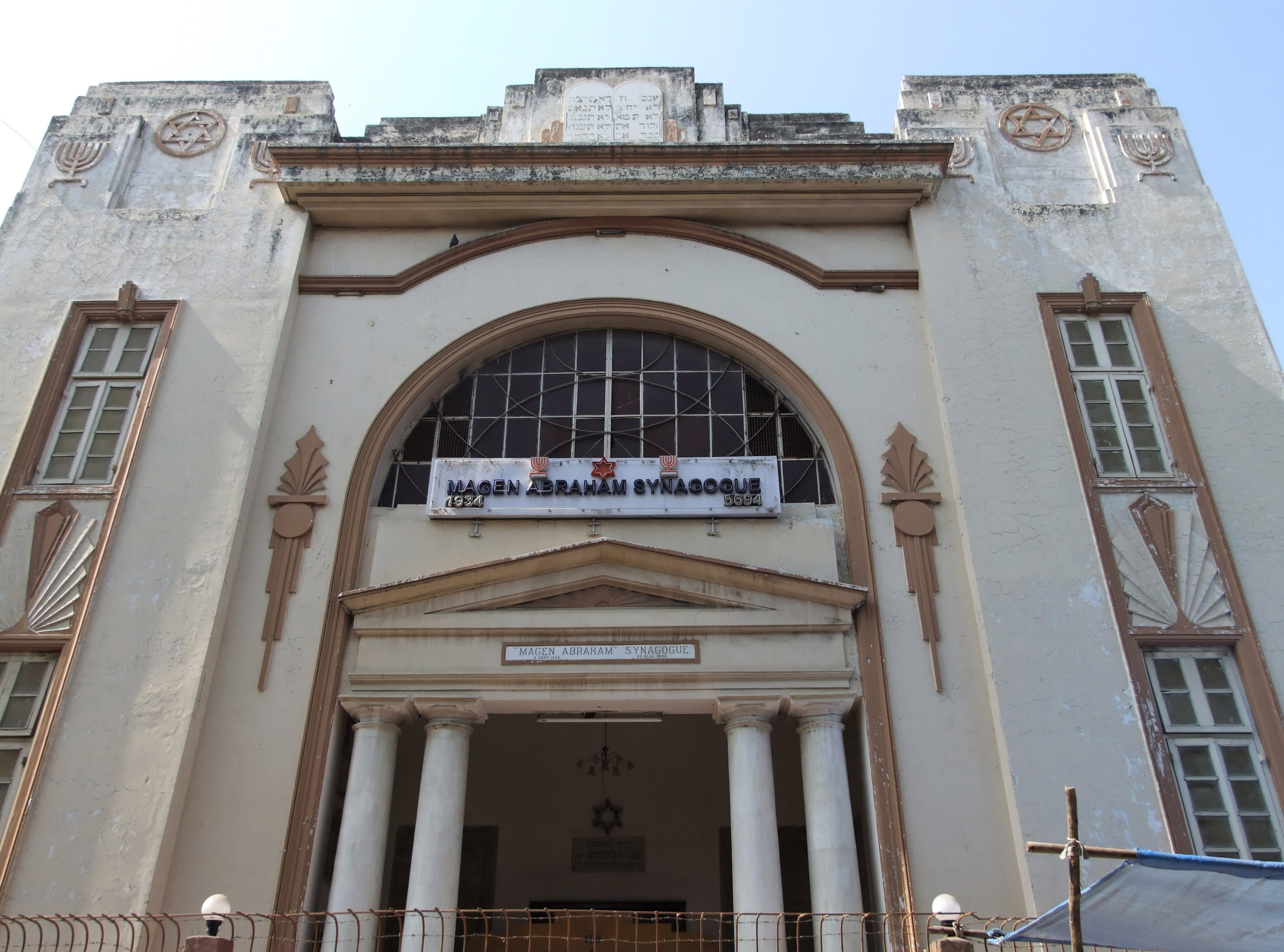
- The synagogue exterior, in 2007

- Location of the synagogue in Gujarat

Religion
- Affiliation: Judaism
- Rite: Nusach Sefard
- Ecclesiastical or organizational status: Synagogue
- Status: Active

Location
- Location: Bawa Latif Street, Old Town of Ahmedabad, Ahmedabad district, Gujarat
- Country: India
- Interactive map of Magen Abraham Synagogue
- Coordinates: 23°01′19″N 72°35′02″E

Architecture
- Architects: Daniel Samson; Ellis Abraham Bhinjekar
- Type: Synagogue architecture
- Style: Indo-Judaic Art Deco
- Founder: Bene Israel community
- Funded by: Dr Solomon Abraham Erulkar
- General contractor: D. V. Patel
- Established: 1848 (as a congregation)
- Groundbreaking: 19 October 1933
- Completed: 1934

Website
- magenabraham.20m.com

The Magen Abraham Synagogue (Hebrew: בית הכנסת מגן אברהם, lit. 'Shield of Abraham Synagogue'; Gujarati: મેગન અબ્રાહમ સિનાગોગ) is a synagogue, located in the Old Town neighbourhood of Ahmedabad, in the state of Gujarat, India. As of 2015, it was the only synagogue in the entire state. It was built in 1934 using donations from members of the Bene Israel Jewish community of the state.

== History ==
Bene Israel Jews first arrived in Gujarat from Maharashtra in the mid-19th century; and the congregation was formed in 1848.

The cornerstone of the synagogue was laid on 19 October 1933 by Abigailbai Benjamin Issac Bhonker. The synagogue was consecrated on 2 September 1934. The synagogue stands on Bawa Latif Street, across the street from a Parsi Fire Temple at Bukhara Mohulla in Khamasa in the Historic City of Ahmadabad. It is included in the heritage list of the city. The synagogue was named in honour of Dr. Abraham Erulkar, one of the first Jews to come to Ahmedabad and the father of Dr. Solomon Abraham Erulkar, who helped to fund construction of the synagogue.

Designed by Daniel Samson and Ellis Abraham Bhinjekar, the synagogue was built in the Indo-Judaic Art Deco architectural form with marble chequered floors and a large ark. The furniture consists of movable pews arranged around a central Bimah. The Ark contains multiple Torah scrolls of many sizes and in hard cases. The women's balcony is unusual, when compared to other synagogues in India, in that it is not supported by pillars. The synagogue has Grecian pillars with triangular roof and high ceiling. There are several religious artefacts including artistic grills, stained glass windows and chandeliers.

== Community ==
The size of the Jewish community in Ahmedabad has reduced considerably since the 1980s, as many families made aliyah to Israel, or emigrated to the United States or Europe. In 2018, the Gujarat government granted minority status to Jews living in the state. As of 2020, there were 120 members.

The synagogue has a small and active community. Pesah and High Holy Days are observed annually.

=== Notable members ===
- Reuben David, a veterinarian who founded the Kamla Nehru Zoological Garden, Kankaria; awarded a Padma Shri
- Esther David, an author, artist, and sculptor and recipient of the Sahitya Akademi Award; daughter of Reuben David
- Esther Solomon, a leading scholar in the study of Sanskrit; awarded a Padma Shri

== Gallery ==
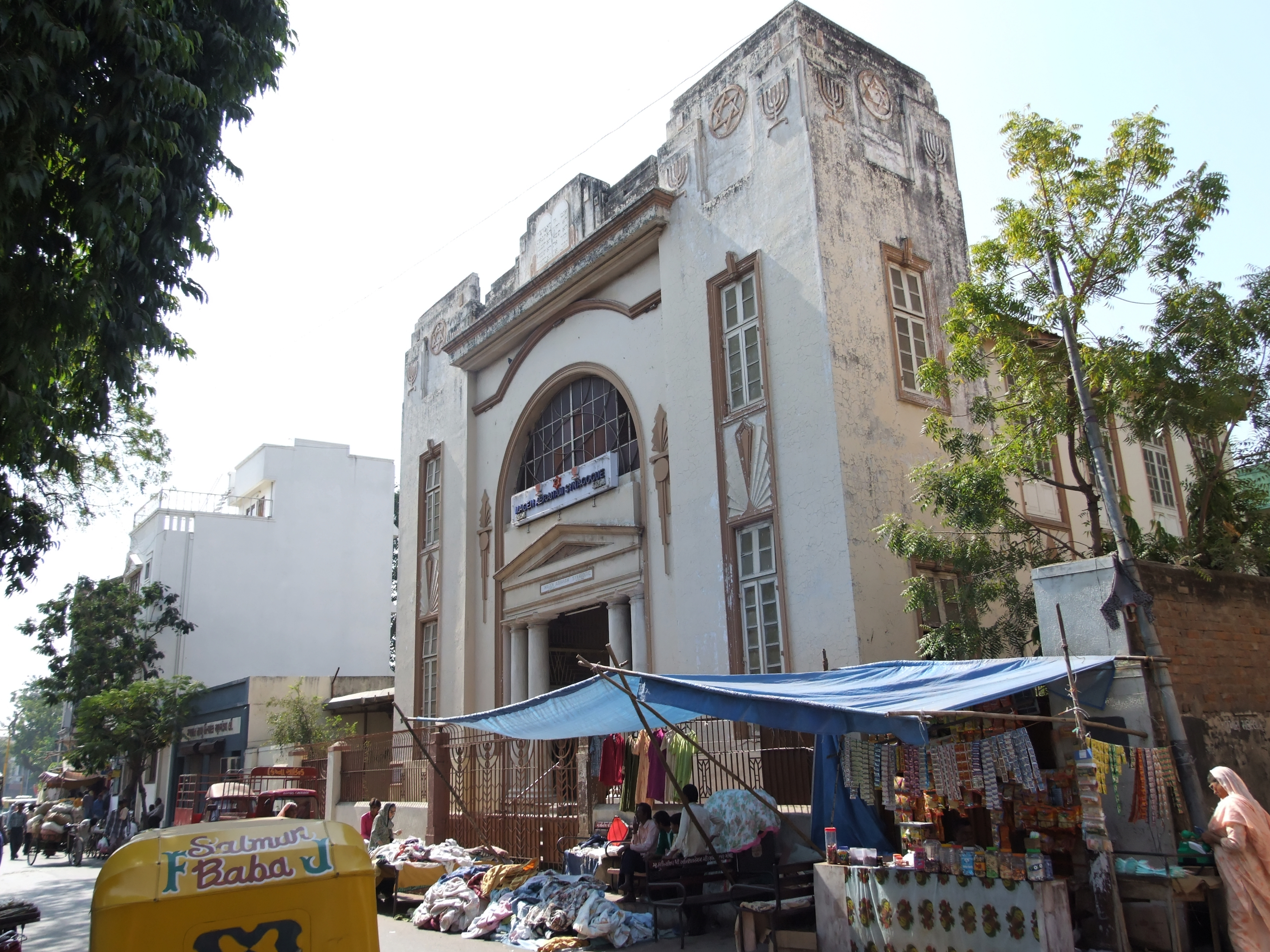
The synagogue and adjacent markets, in 2012

== See also ==
- History of the Jews in India
- List of synagogues in India
