= Synagogue =

Place of worship for Jews or Samaritans

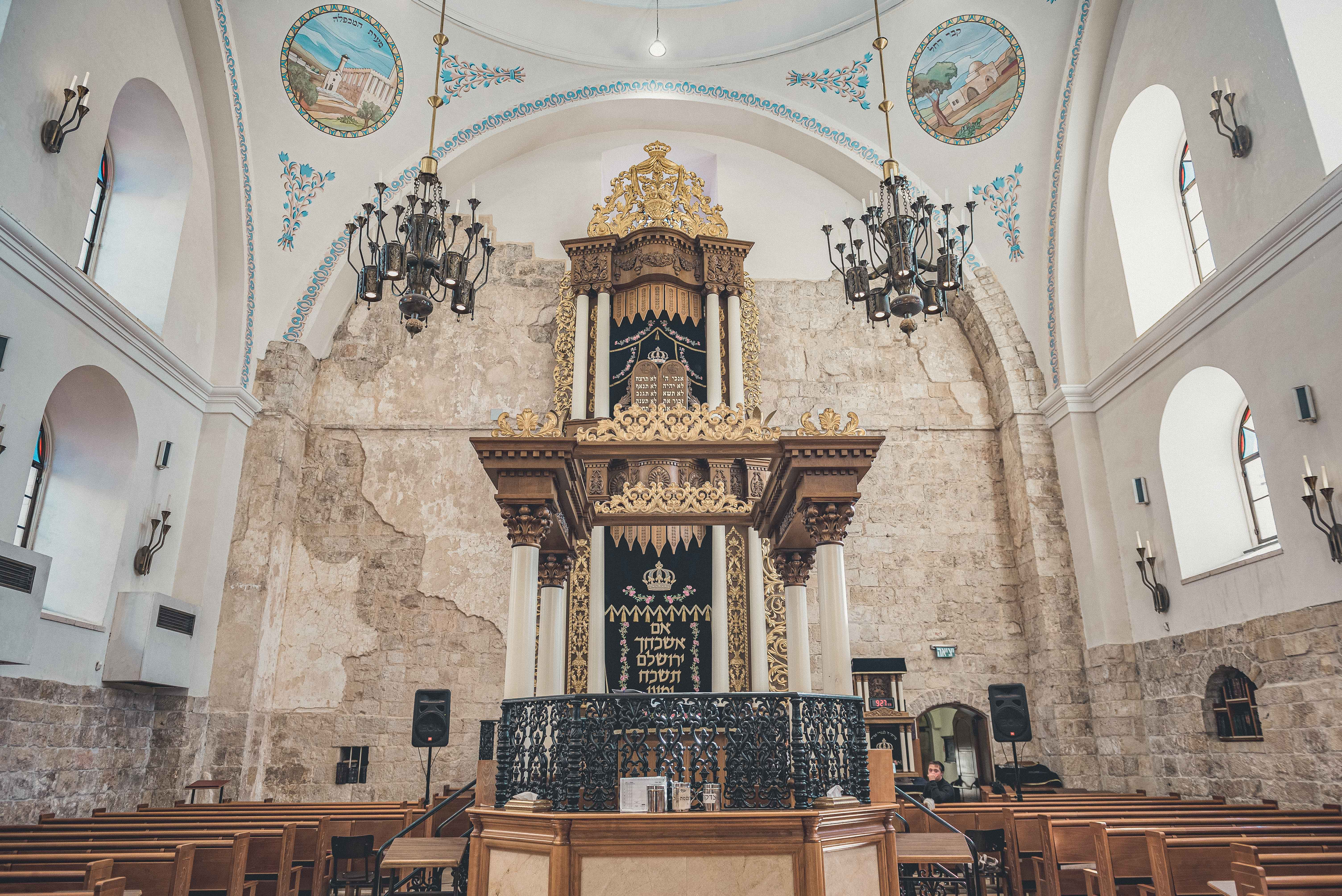
Hurva Synagogue in Jerusalem, Israel

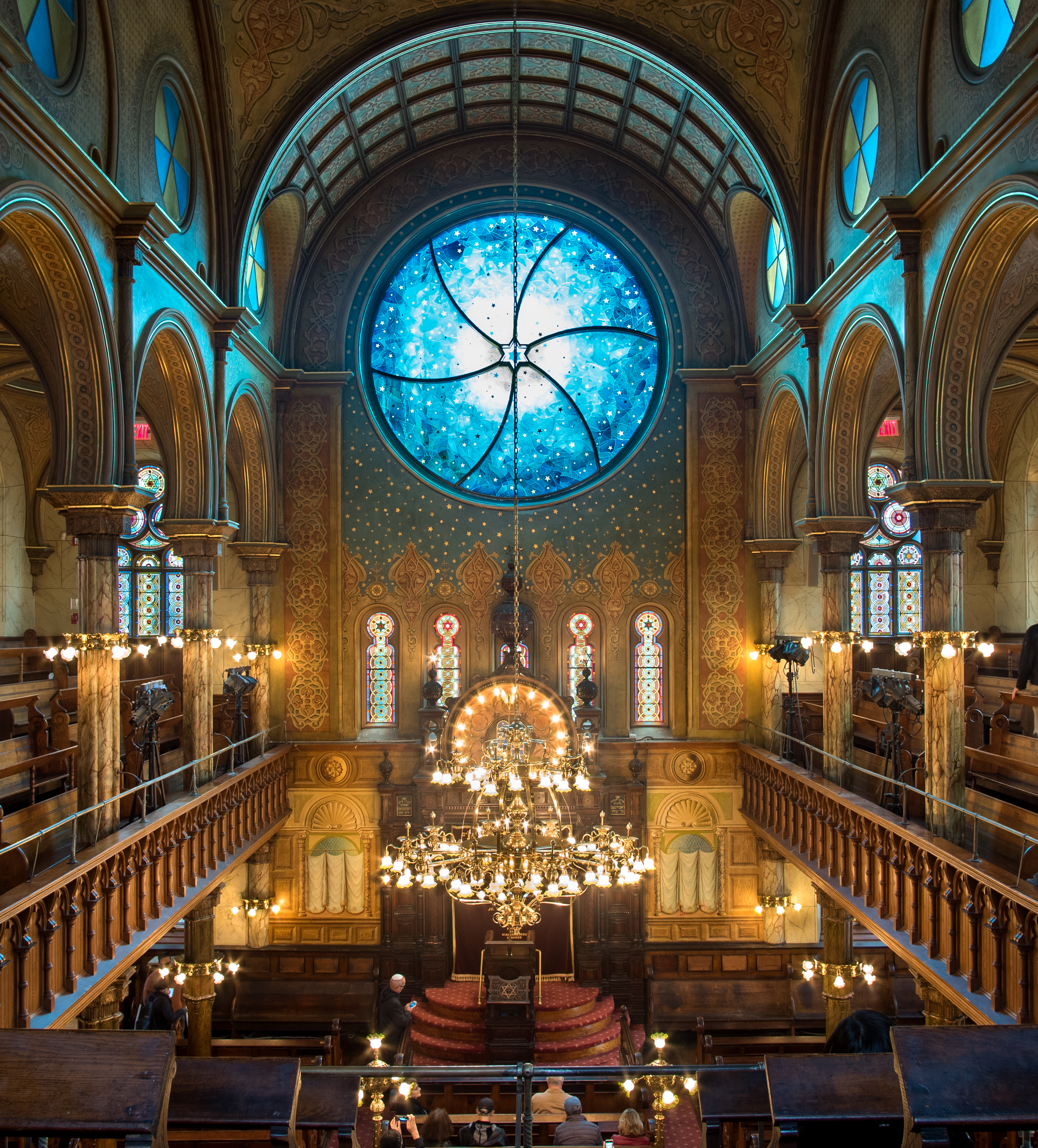
Eldridge Street Synagogue in New York City, United States

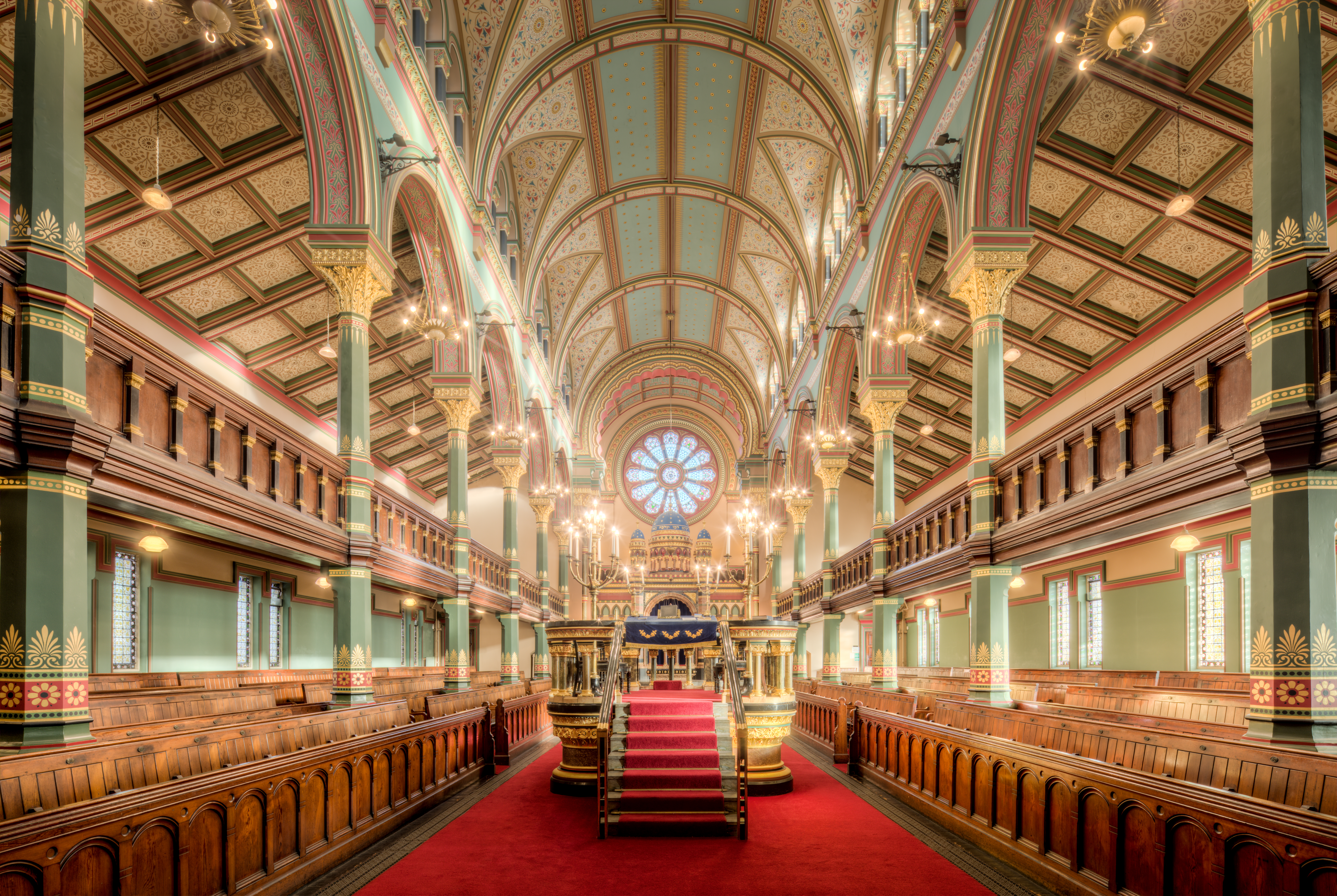
Princes Road Synagogue in Liverpool, England

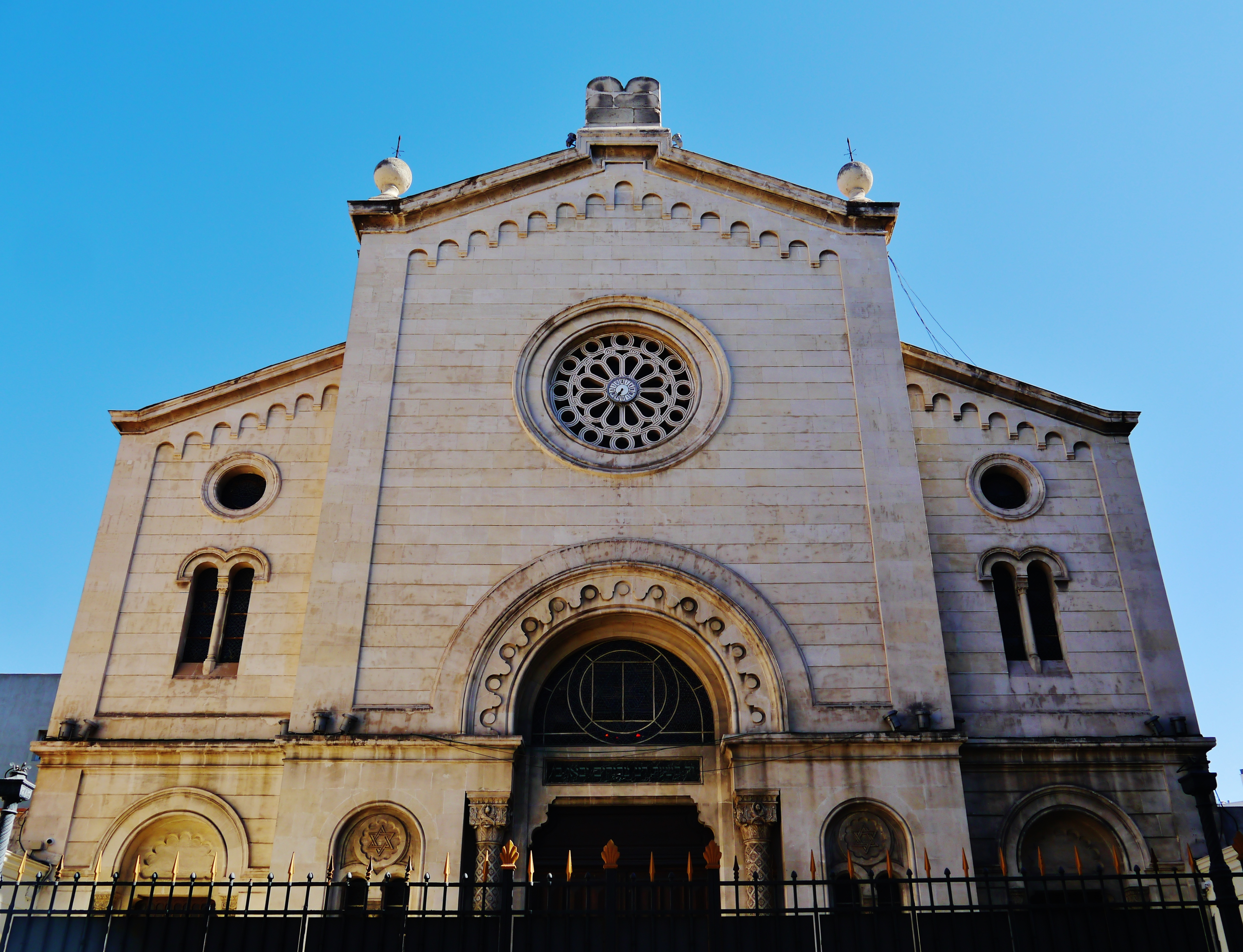
Exterior of Great Synagogue of Marseille in Marseille, France

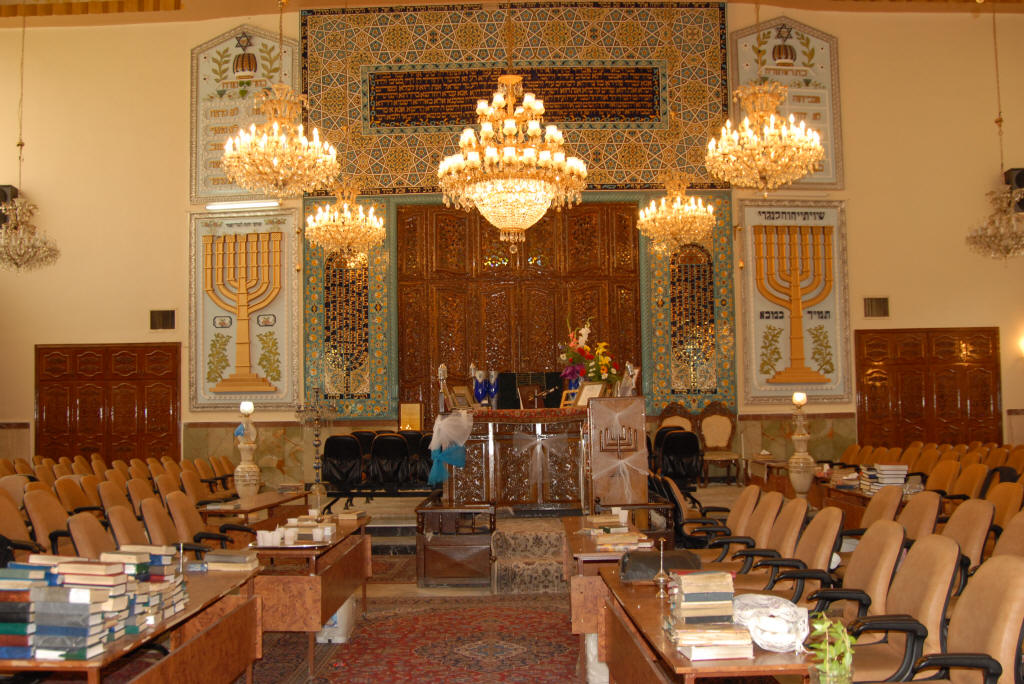
Yusef Abad Synagogue in Tehran, Iran

A synagogue (Note: Pronounced /ˈsɪnəɡɒɡ/ SIN-ə-gog. From Koine Greek: συναγωγή, romanized: synagogē, lit. 'assembly'; Hebrew: בית כנסת, romanized: bēṯ kənesseṯ, lit. 'house of assembly', or Hebrew: בית תפילה, romanized: bēṯ təfilā, lit. 'house of prayer'; Yiddish: שול, romanized: shul, Ladino: אשנוגה or אסנוגה esnoga (from "synagogue"); or קהל kahal, "community".) or synagog, 'Beit Kneset'—"house of gathering" in Hebrew, also called a shul (Note: Pronounced /ʃuːl/ SHOOL.) (meaning school in Yiddish) or a temple, (Note: Used often, but not predominantly, for Reform and Conservative Judaism congregations.) is a place of worship for Jews or Samaritans.

It serves as a house of prayer. It includes a main sanctuary with the Torah ark where the Torah scrolls are kept (called a Holy Closet aron qodesh (Hebrew: אָרוֹן קׄדֶש) by Ashkenazi Jews and a hekhal (היכל) by Sephardic Jews), and a stage called bema in front of it as well as raised galleries for female worshipers. Synagogues have religious services or ceremonies such as Daily prayers, Shabbat prayers (Saturday) weddings, bar and bat mitzvahs. Synagogues often also contain study rooms, social halls, administrative and charitable offices, classrooms for religious and Hebrew studies, and spaces for community gatherings. They frequently display commemorative, historic, or modern artwork alongside items of Jewish historical significance or exhibits about the synagogue itself.

Synagogues are buildings used for Jewish prayer, study, assembly, and reading of the Torah. The Torah (Pentateuch or Five Books of Moses) is traditionally read in its entirety over a period of a year in weekly portions during services, or in some synagogues on a triennial cycle. However, the edifice of a synagogue as such is not essential for holding Jewish worship. Halakha (Jewish law from the Mishnah—the "Oral Torah") states that communal Jewish worship can be carried out wherever a minyan, a group of at least 10 Jewish adults, is assembled, often (but not necessarily) led by a rabbi. This minyan is the essence of Jewish communal worship, which can also be conducted alone or with fewer than ten people, but that excludes certain prayers as well as communal Torah reading. In terms of its specific ritual and liturgical functions, the synagogue does not replace the long-destroyed Temple in Jerusalem.

Any Jew or group of Jews can build a synagogue. Synagogues have been constructed by ancient Jewish leaders, wealthy patrons, and as part of a wide range of human institutions, including secular educational institutions, governments, and hotels. They have been built by the entire Jewish community living in a particular village or region, or by sub-groups of Jewish people organized by occupation, tradition/background (e.g., the Sephardic, Yemenite, Romaniote or Persian Jews of a town), style of religious observance (e.g., Orthodox or Reform synagogues), or by the followers of a particular rabbi, such as the shtiebelekh (Yiddish: שטיבעלעך, romanized: shtibelekh, singular שטיבל shtibl) of Hasidic Judaism.

== Terminology ==
The Hebrew term is bet knesset (בית כנסת) or "house of assembly". The Koine Greek-derived word synagogue (συναγωγή) also means "assembly" and is commonly used in English, with its earliest mention in the 1st century Theodotos inscription in Jerusalem. Ashkenazi Jews have traditionally used the Yiddish term shul (from the Greek schola, which is also the source of the English "school") in everyday speech, and many continue to do so in English.

Sephardi Jews and Romaniote Jews generally use the term kal (from the Hebrew qahal "community"). Spanish and Portuguese Jews call the synagogue an esnoga and Portuguese Jews may call it a sinagoga. Persian Jews and some Karaite Jews also use the term kenesa, which is derived from Aramaic, and some Mizrahi Jews use kenis or qnis, the Arabic word for a synagogue, or ṣla, the Arabic word for prayer.

== History ==
=== Origins ===
The origins of the synagogue are obscure. Scholarly opinion has been divided among several views. The first holds that the synagogue arose after Josiah's reform of 622/1 BCE banned sacrifice outside the First Temple in Jerusalem. The second, long the most widely held, holds that it was created during the Babylonian exile as an alternative form of worship after the Temple's destruction in 587/6 BCE. The third view traces it to Ezra's public reading of the Torah in 5th-century BCE Jerusalem as narrated in the biblical Book of Nehemiah. Other scholars have proposed an origin among diaspora communities in Hellenistic Egypt.

Historian and archaeologist Lee I. Levine argues that the synagogue developed gradually between the 5th and 1st centuries BCE. In biblical times, communal life centered on the city gate and the open space beside it, which served as a marketplace, a courtroom, a venue for delivering prophecies, a forum for public assemblies, and sometimes a site of worship. Archaeological evidence, mainly from pagan coastal cities, shows that in the Hellenistic period gates became simple passageways between towers. In Levin's view, the activities once held there moved into what became known as the synagogue. Levine suggests the institution emerged more or less simultaneously in Judea, where the old gate setting was disappearing, and in the diaspora, where Jews could not use the gates of pagan cities for communal life.

=== Second Temple period ===
The earliest firm evidence for the synagogue comes from the Second Temple period, and more specifically, from 3rd-century BCE Ptolemaic Egypt, where several inscriptions and papyri in Koine Greek mention a προσευχή, proseukhē, 'house of prayer' (plural: προσευχαί, proseukhái). The oldest dedications date to the reign of Ptolemy III Euergetes, king of Egypt between 246 and 221 BCE. Egyptian Jews commonly dedicated their prayer houses on behalf of the reigning king and queen. No synagogue building has yet been found in Egypt. The oldest known synagogue building is the Delos Synagogue on the Aegean island of Delos, which was in use at least from the first century BCE. It is the only pre-70 diaspora structure widely identified as a synagogue.

Synagogues are attested in the Land of Israel after they appeared in the diaspora, with the earliest known example dating from the late 2nd century BCE. Earlier Jewish and pagan writings are almost silent about synagogues in this region. Ben Sira and the books of Maccabees do not mention it, and where synagōgē appears in 1 Maccabees, it refers to a group of people, not a building. For a long time, few sites supported the existence of synagogue buildings in the regions of Judea and Galilee before the destruction of Jerusalem in 70 CE. In the Herodian palace-fort hilltop complexes of Masada and Herodium, the synagogues were not built as such but were adapted by rebels during the First Jewish Revolt and the Bar Kokhba Revolt. The first site to become generally accepted as a purpose-built synagogue was the Gamla Synagogue in Gamla, an ancient Jewish town in the Golan Heights, with proposed dates ranging from the mid-first century BCE to roughly the turn of the era.

Excavation has since widened the picture. Proposed Second Temple-era synagogues now include Khirbet Badd 'Isa (in Modi'in Illit), Umm el-'Umdan (in Modi'in), where a Hasmonean-period building was succeeded by a Herodian one, and the Migdal Synagogue (in ancient Magdala) with its two phases. Their typical layout is an open hall lined with benches, with a roof carried on interior colonnades. Other proposals remain disputed, including the public structure at Horvat 'Ethri and small rural sites such as Horvat Diab and Tel Rekhesh. The Theodotus inscription, dated to between the first century BCE and the first century CE, points to a synagogue serving a Greek-speaking community in Jerusalem.

By the first century CE, the synagogue was the central communal institution of Jewish communities in both Judaea and the diaspora. Large cities such as Jerusalem, Alexandria, and Rome had several, and smaller Jewish communities throughout the Roman Empire probably had at least one each, so it is probable that hundreds, perhaps thousands, existed. Philo and Josephus mention lavishly adorned synagogues in Alexandria and in Antioch, respectively.

Diaspora synagogues varied in name and practice. They went by many names in Greek, including proseukhē, synagōgē, hieron, sabbateion, and didaskaleion. This diversity arose partly because the founding communities had no model to follow, and partly because each community adopted patterns from its surrounding culture, in organization as well as in architecture. Most used Greek in inscriptions and official titles, and honored benefactors in Greco-Roman fashion. Yet the institution remained distinctively Jewish, centered on the reading of scripture.

In both Judaea and the diaspora, the main religious activity was public Torah reading. In the diaspora, at least, this took place above all on Shabbat, Judaism's weekly day of rest. In the diaspora, synagogues also safeguarded sacred books and money collected for the Jerusalem Temple, and many had halls for communal meals. The Book of Acts describes a Shabbat service at Antioch of Pisidia in which readings from the Torah and Nevi'im were followed by an invitation to address the congregation. A synagogue could also serve as a court, school, hostel, or venue for political meetings. Roman decrees preserved by Josephus upheld the Jews' right to assemble, collect funds, and dine together, even in Rome, where other religious associations were banned.

Levine rejects the once-common view of the synagogue as a rival to the Jerusalem Temple or as a creation of the Pharisaic movement. In Judea, it held no special sanctity during the Second Temple period. Several sources show priests prominent in its affairs, and no evidence connects the early synagogue with the Pharisees.

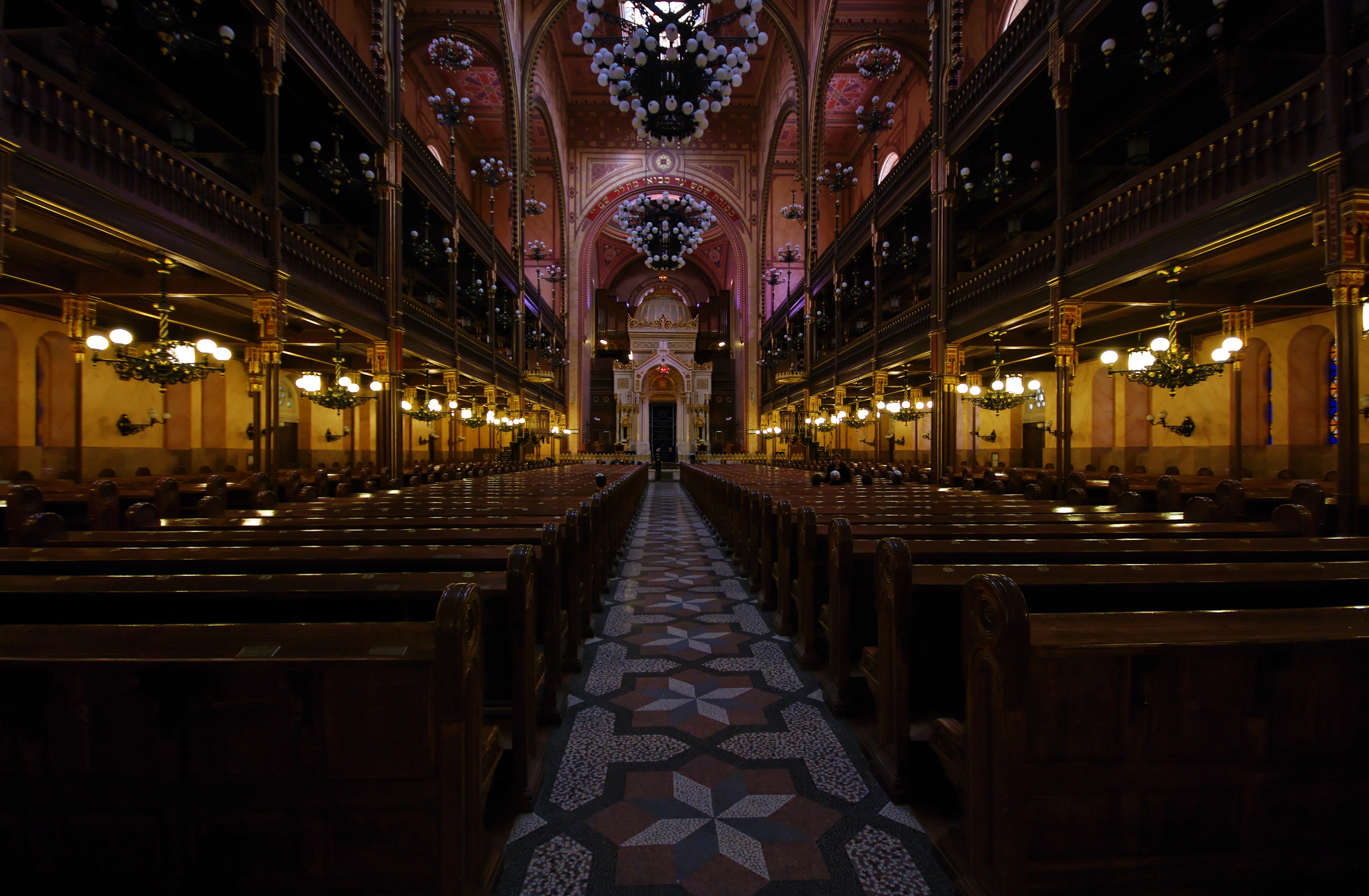
The Dohány Street Synagogue, the biggest synagogue in Europe. Budapest is known to be a central location in Jewish enlightenment.

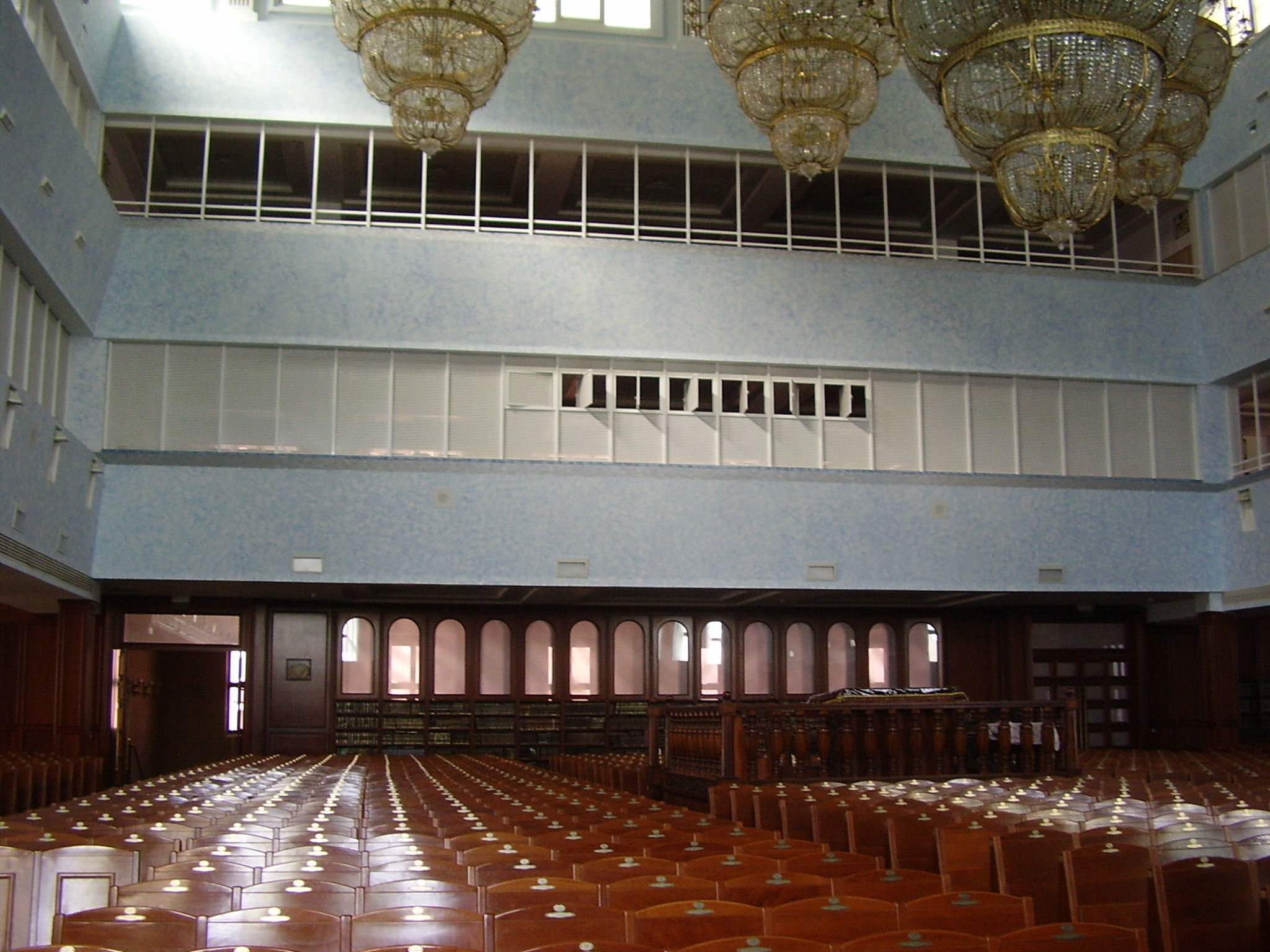
Belz Great Synagogue in Jerusalem, the biggest synagogue in the world.

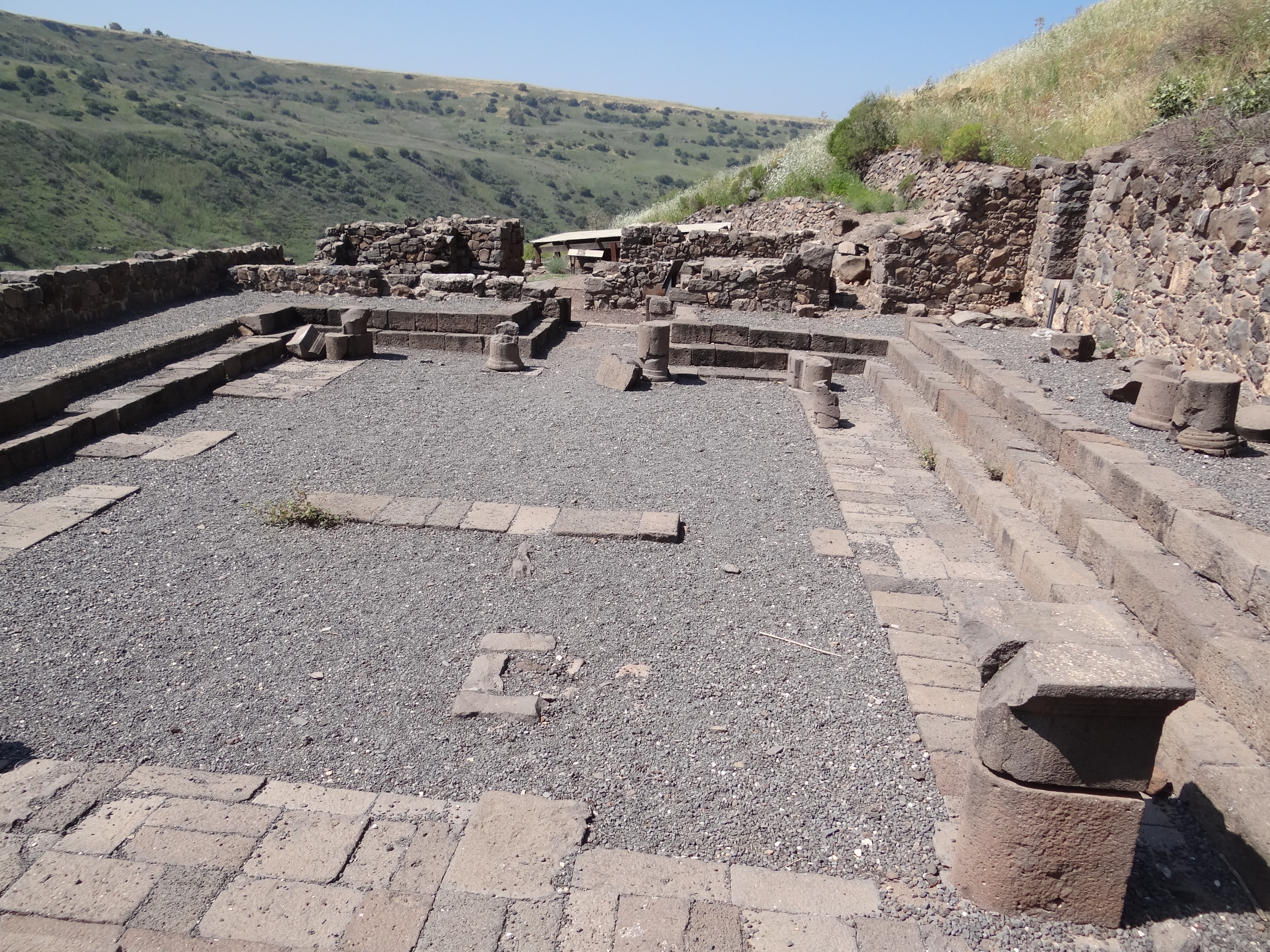
First-century synagogue at Gamla

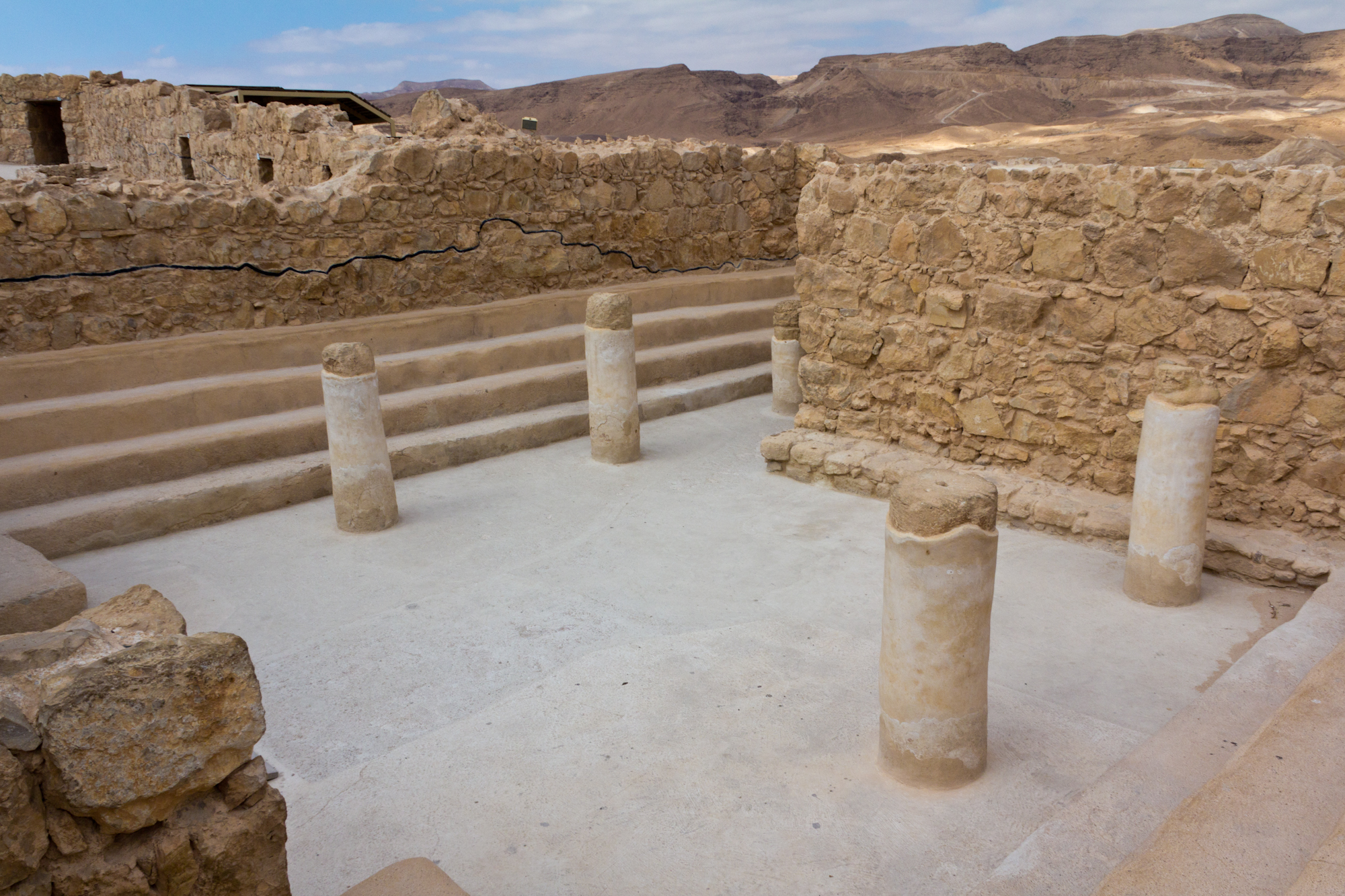
First-century synagogue at Masada

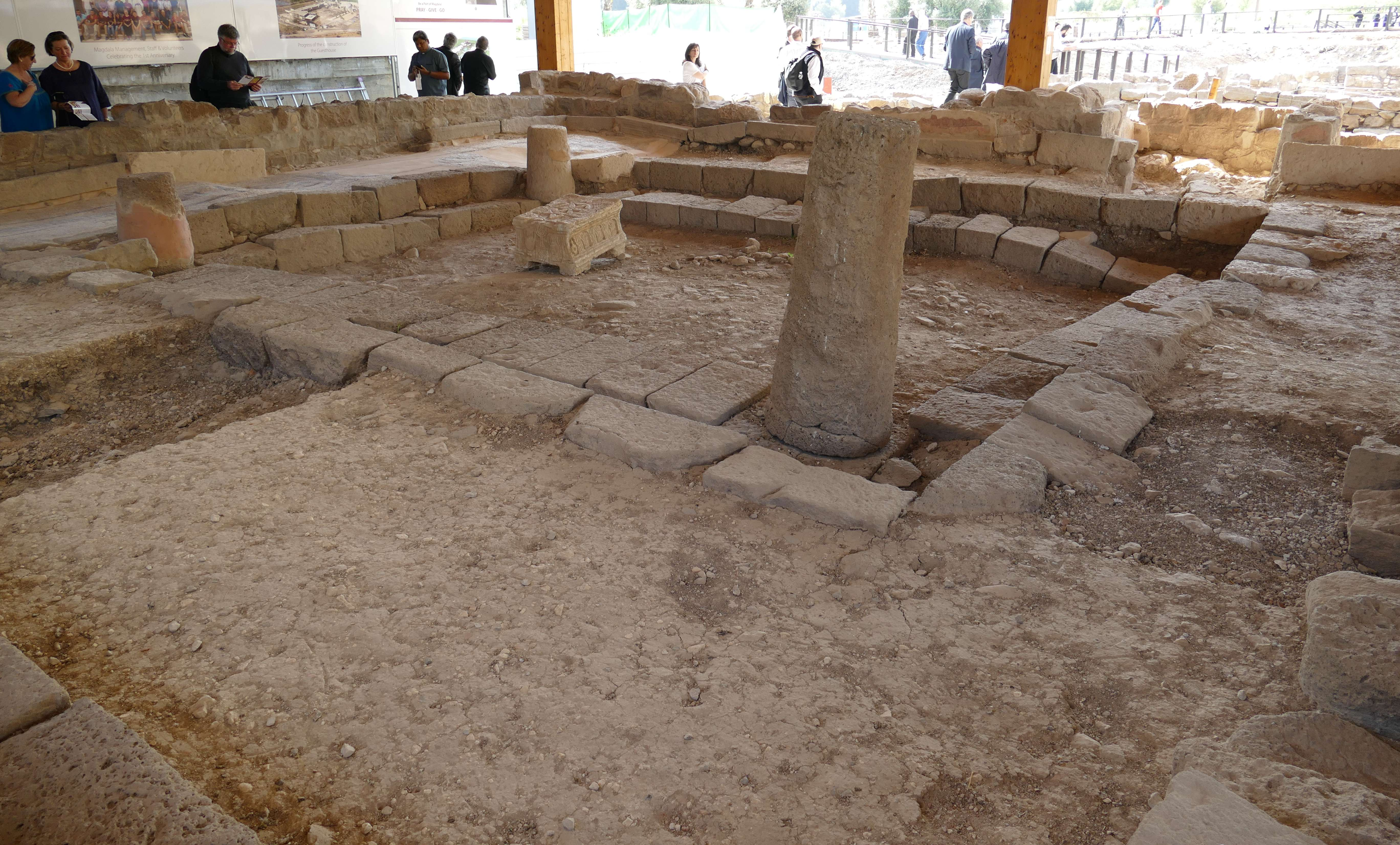
First-century synagogue at Magdala

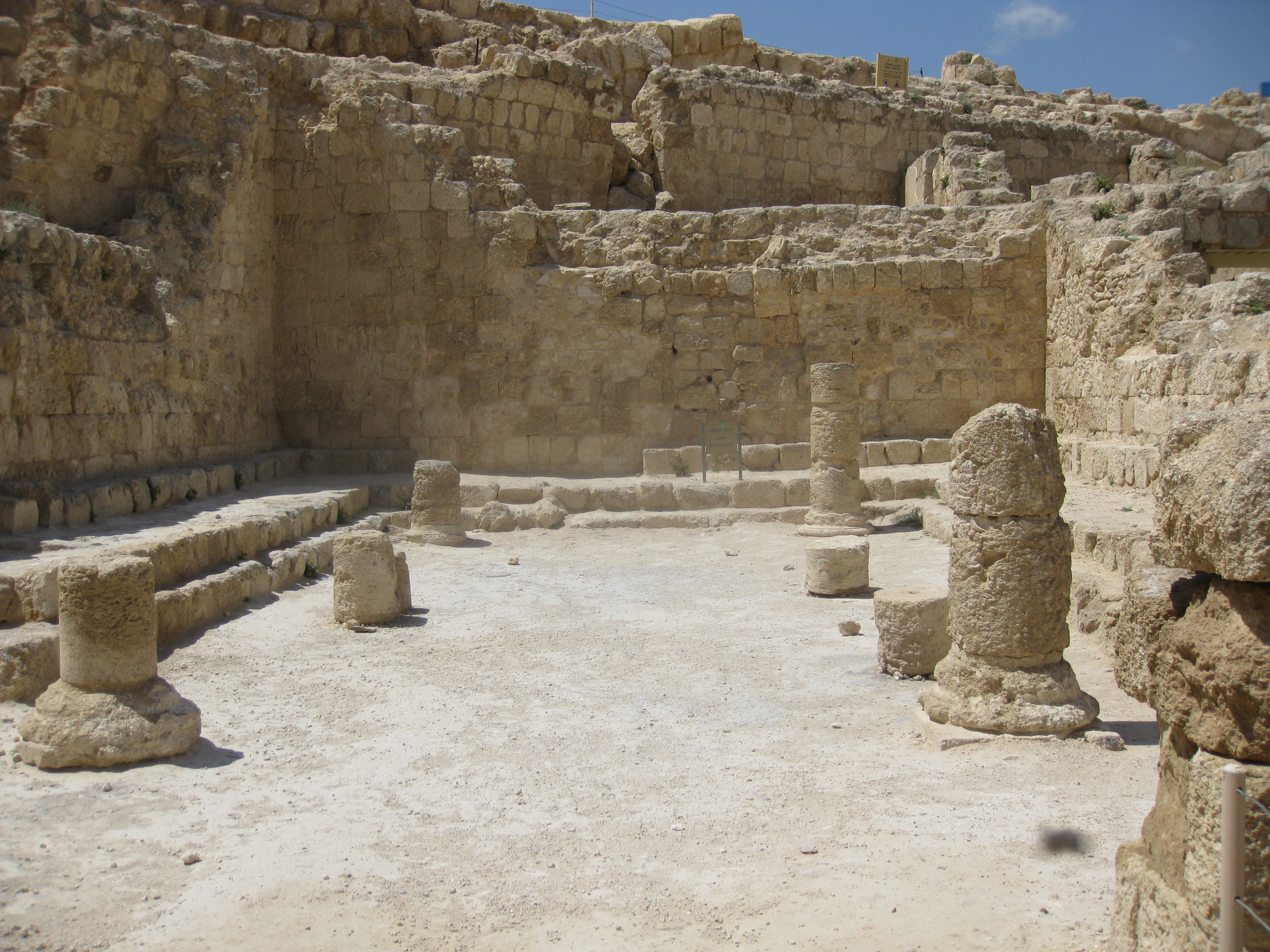
First-century synagogue at Herodium

=== Talmudic period ===
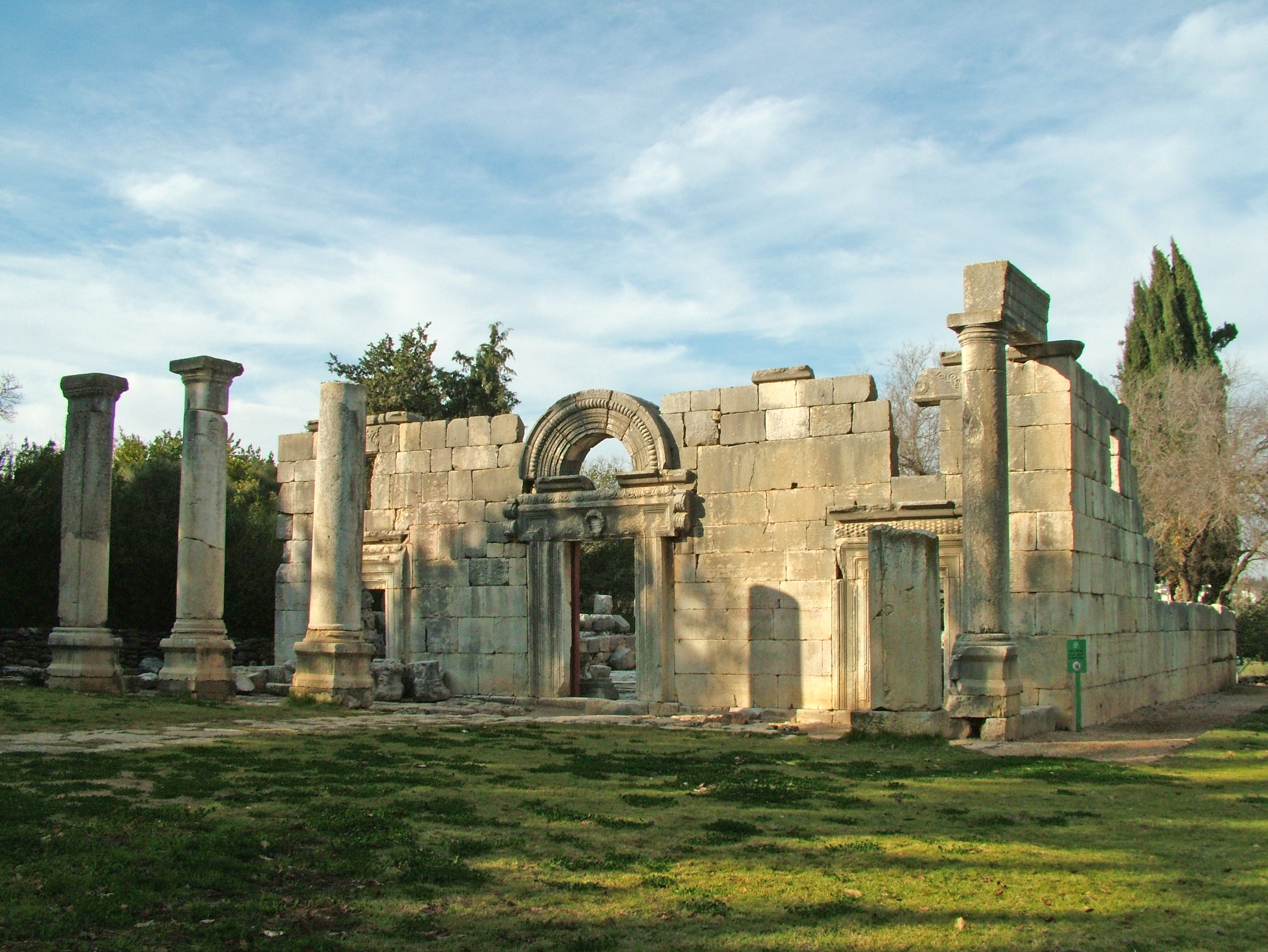
Kfar Bar'am synagogue ruins from the Talmudic period

Following the destruction of the Temple, the synagogue became the focal point of Jewish worship and communal life. Lester L. Grabbe writes: "The rise of the synagogue was a fortuitous but vital development which paved the way for a post-temple Judaism which became necessary after 70 [...] Synagogues were not planned as a substitute for the temple but they were a useful vehicle to make the transition." Over time, prayers, rituals, and customs once performed in the Temple were adapted for synagogue use. Traditional forms of synagogal worship, including sermons and the reading of scripture, were preserved, while new forms of worship, such as piyyut and organized prayer, developed. Rabbinic instruction, however, maintained that certain practices should remain exclusive to the Temple. The Mishnah directed prayers toward Jerusalem, and most synagogues face the Temple site rather than mirroring its orientation, establishing them as extensions of its sanctity, not replicas.

During Late antiquity (third to seventh century CE), literary sources attest to the existence of a large number of synagogues across the Roman-Byzantine and Sasanian Empires. Archaeological evidence indicates the presence of synagogues in at least thirteen places across the diaspora, spanning from Dura-Europos in Syria to Elche in Hispania (modern-day Spain). An especially sizable and monumental synagogue dating from this period is the Sardis Synagogue. Additionally, many inscriptions pertaining to synagogues and their officials have been discovered.

In the Land of Israel, late antiquity witnessed a significant increase in synagogue construction, in Galilee and Golan in the north and the southern hills of Judea, in the south. Each synagogue was constructed according to the means and religious customs of the local community. Notable examples include Capernaum, Bar'am, Beth Alpha, Maoz Haim, Meroth and Nabratein in the north, and Eshtemoa, Susya, Anim, and Maon in the south.

There is epigraphic and archaeological evidence that a synagogue dating to the third century existed to serve a significant Jewish community in Volubilis, capital of the former Kingdom of Mauretania, in what is now Morocco.

=== Middle Ages ===
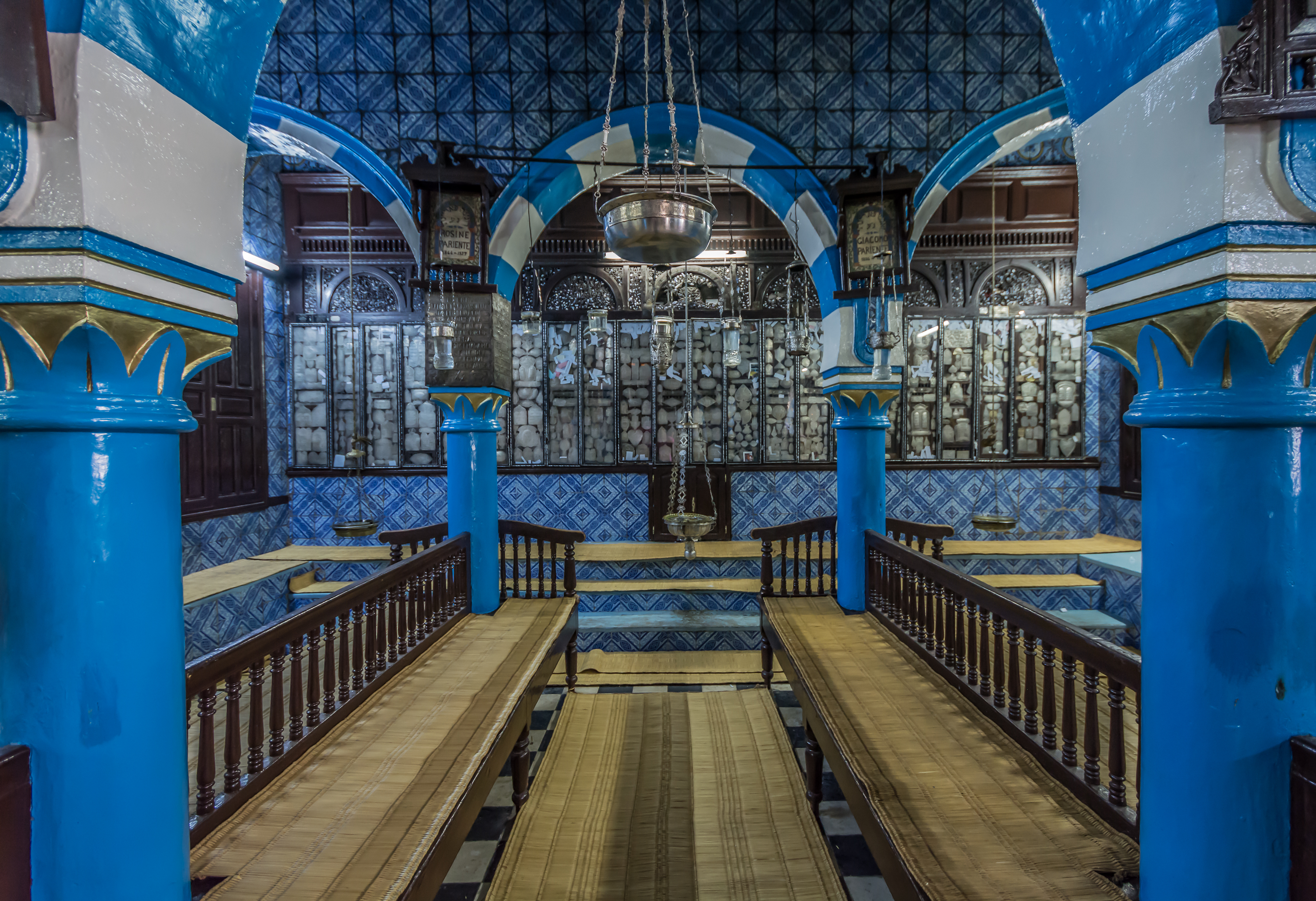
El Ghriba Synagogue in Djerba, Tunisia

Rabbi and philosopher Maimonides (1138–1204) described the various customs in his day with respect to local synagogues:

Synagogues and houses of study must be treated with respect. They are swept and sprinkled [with water] to lay the dust. In Spain and the Maghreb, in Babylonia and in the Holy Land, it is customary to kindle lamps in the synagogues and to spread mats on the floor upon which the worshippers sit. In the lands of Edom (Christendom), they sit in synagogues upon chairs [or benches].

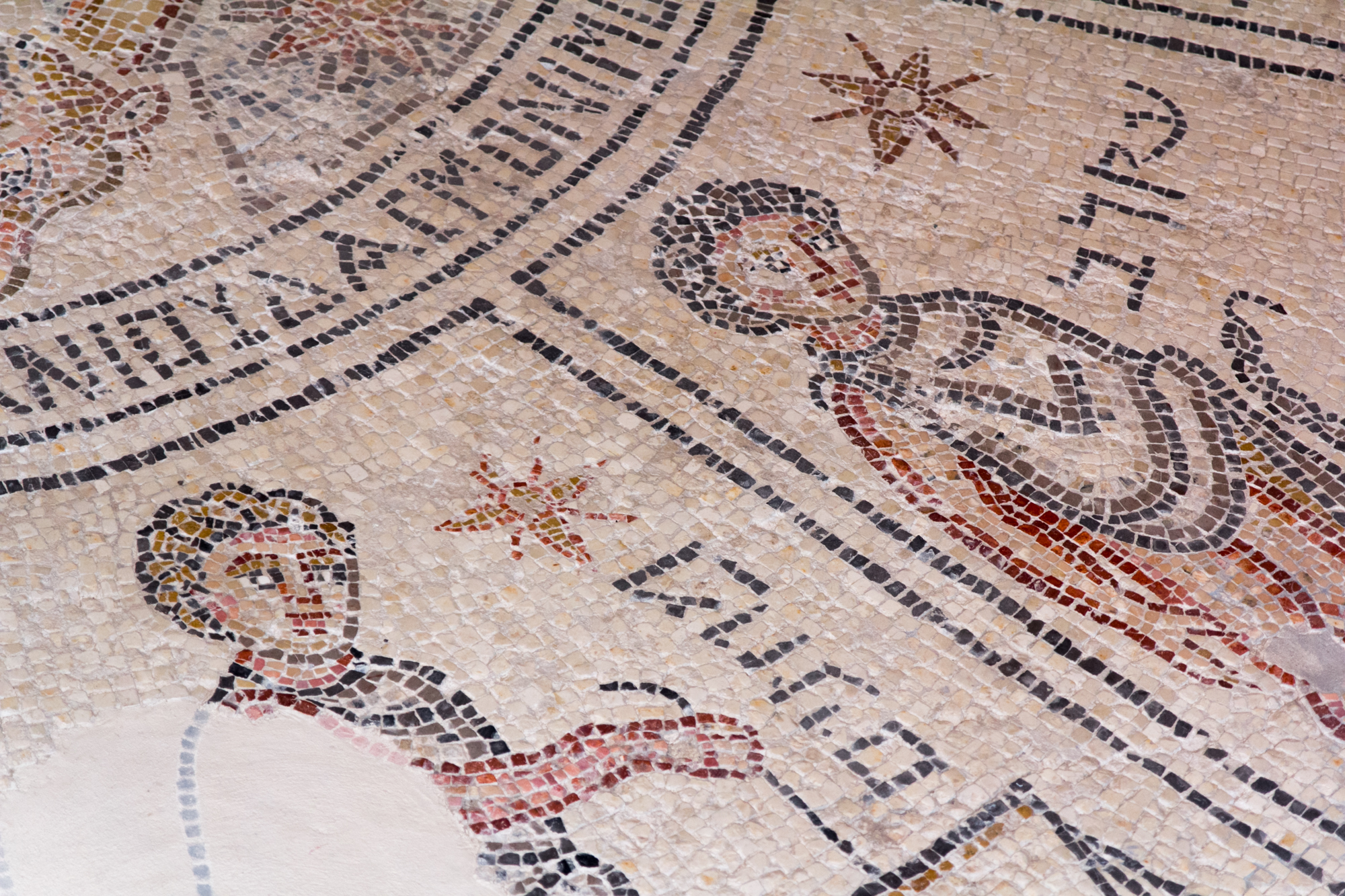
Mosaic in the Tzippori Synagogue

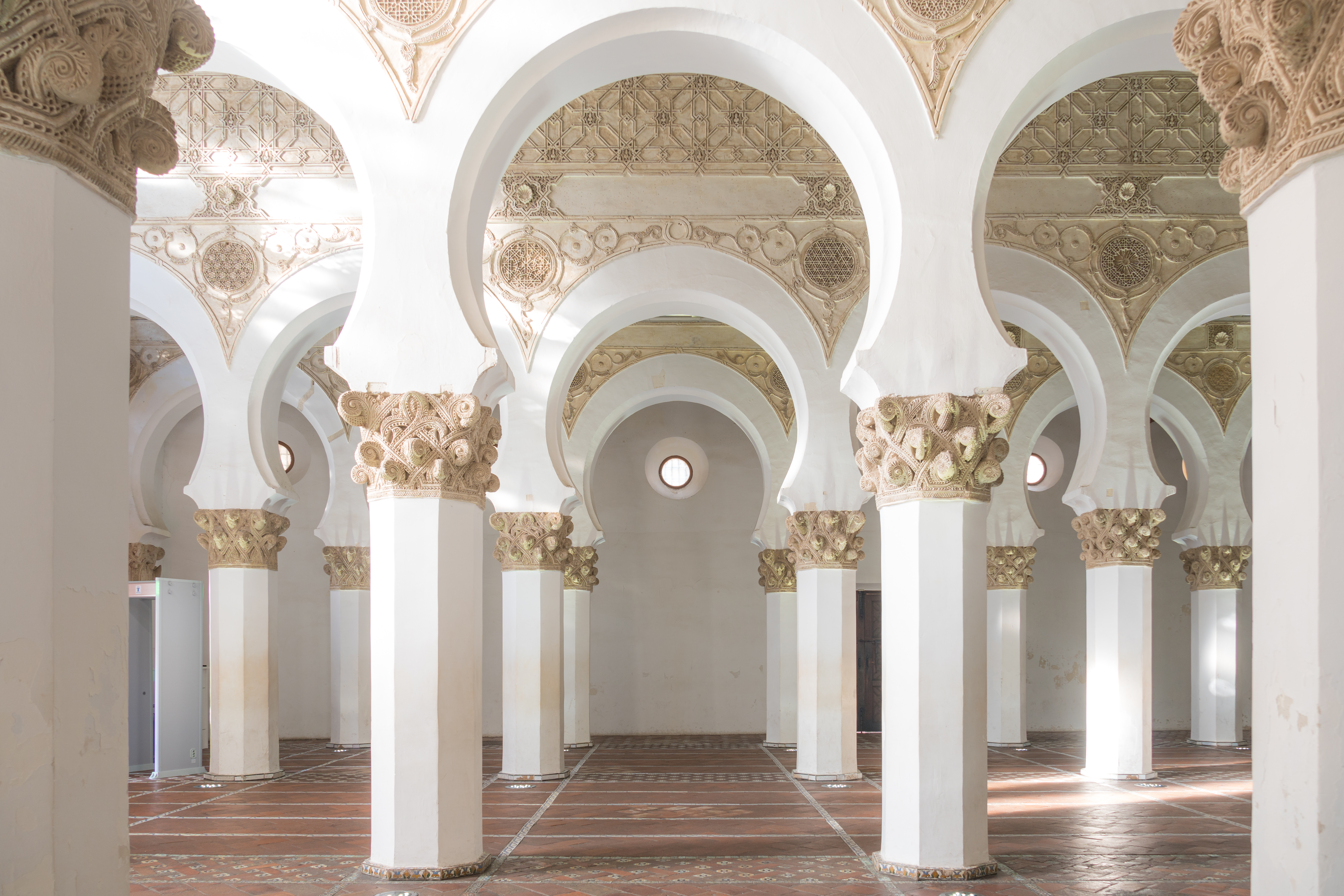
Synagogue of Santa María la Blanca in Toledo

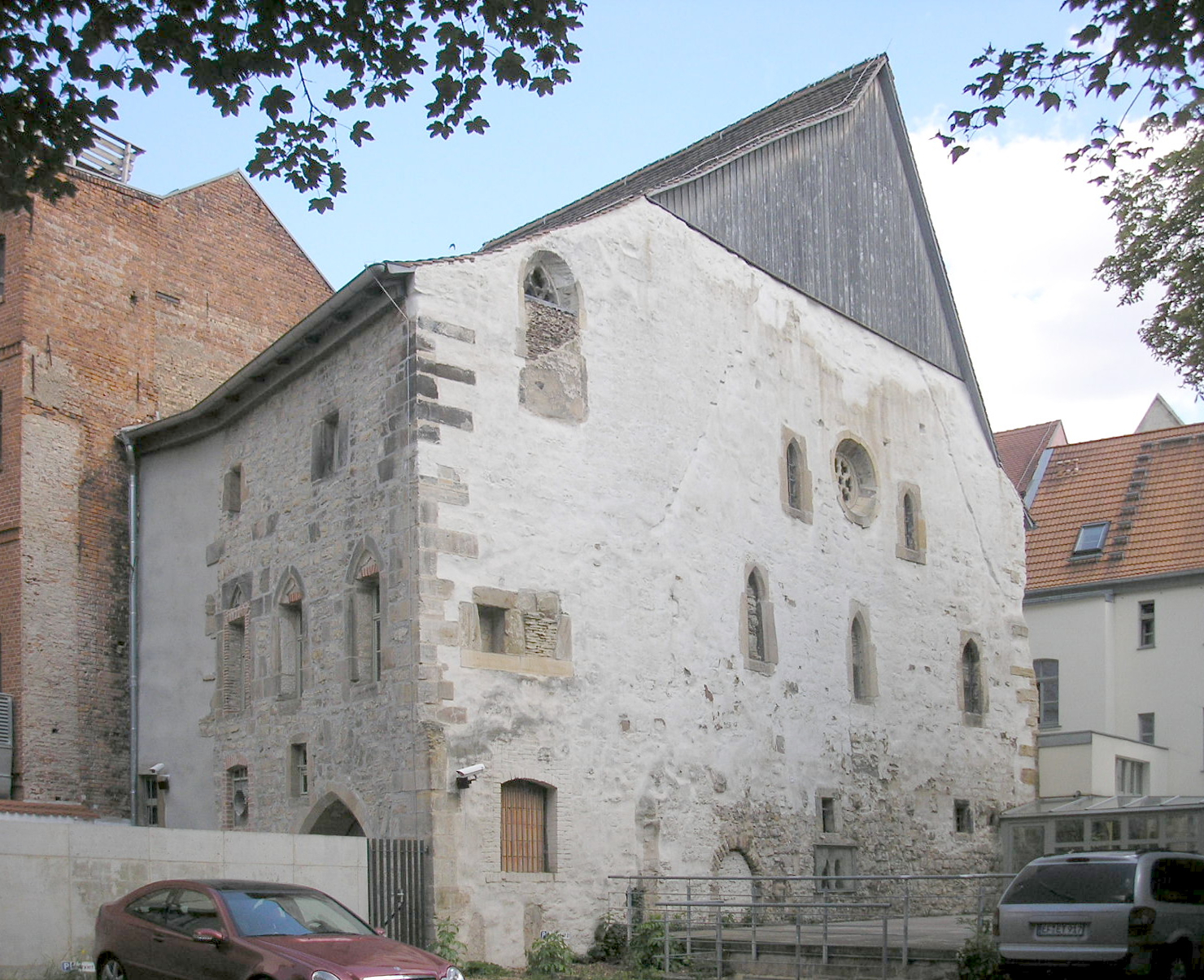
The Old Synagogue (Erfurt) is the oldest intact synagogue building in Europe, in parts around 1100 CE

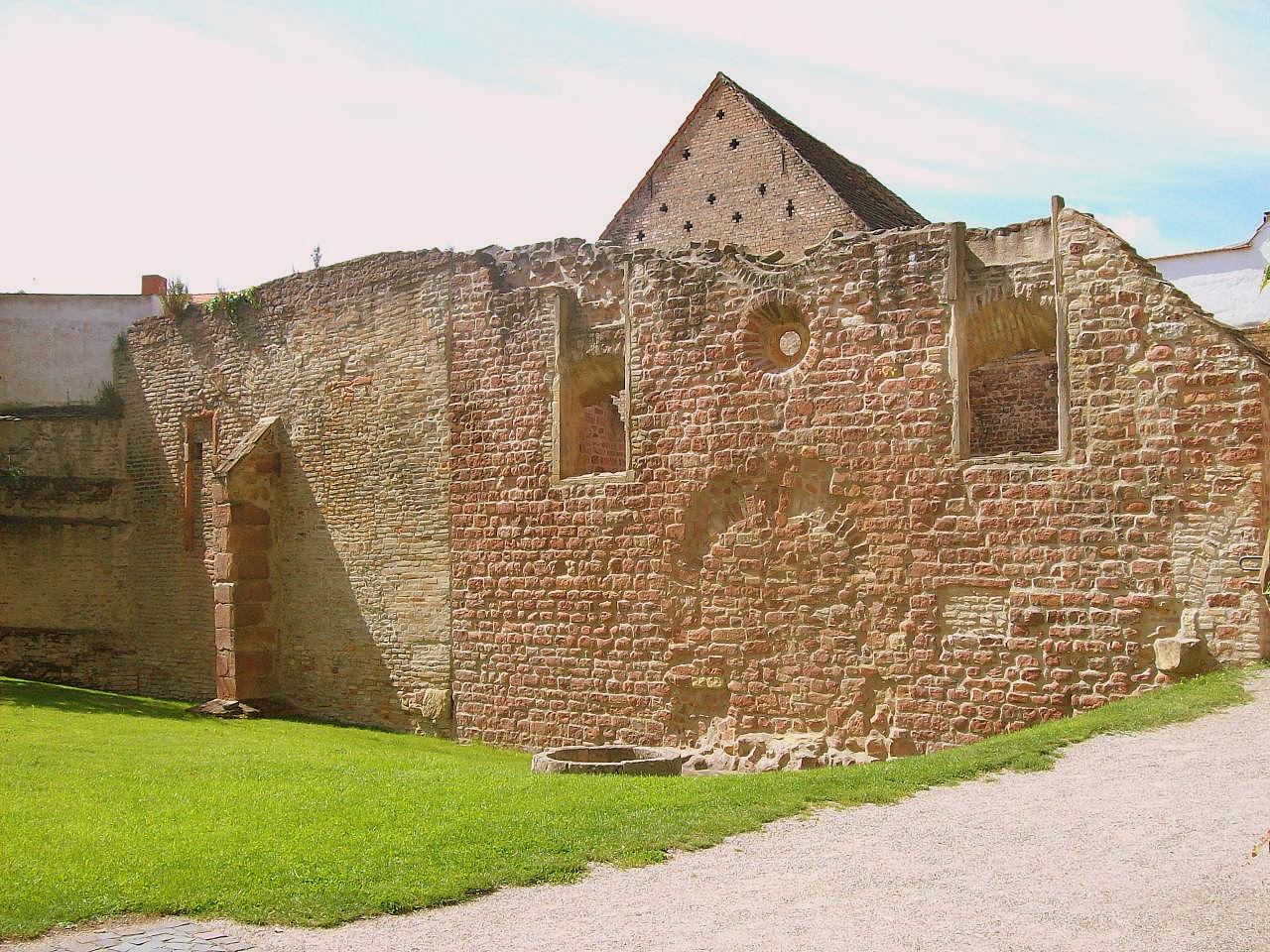
Speyer Synagogue, a World Heritage Site

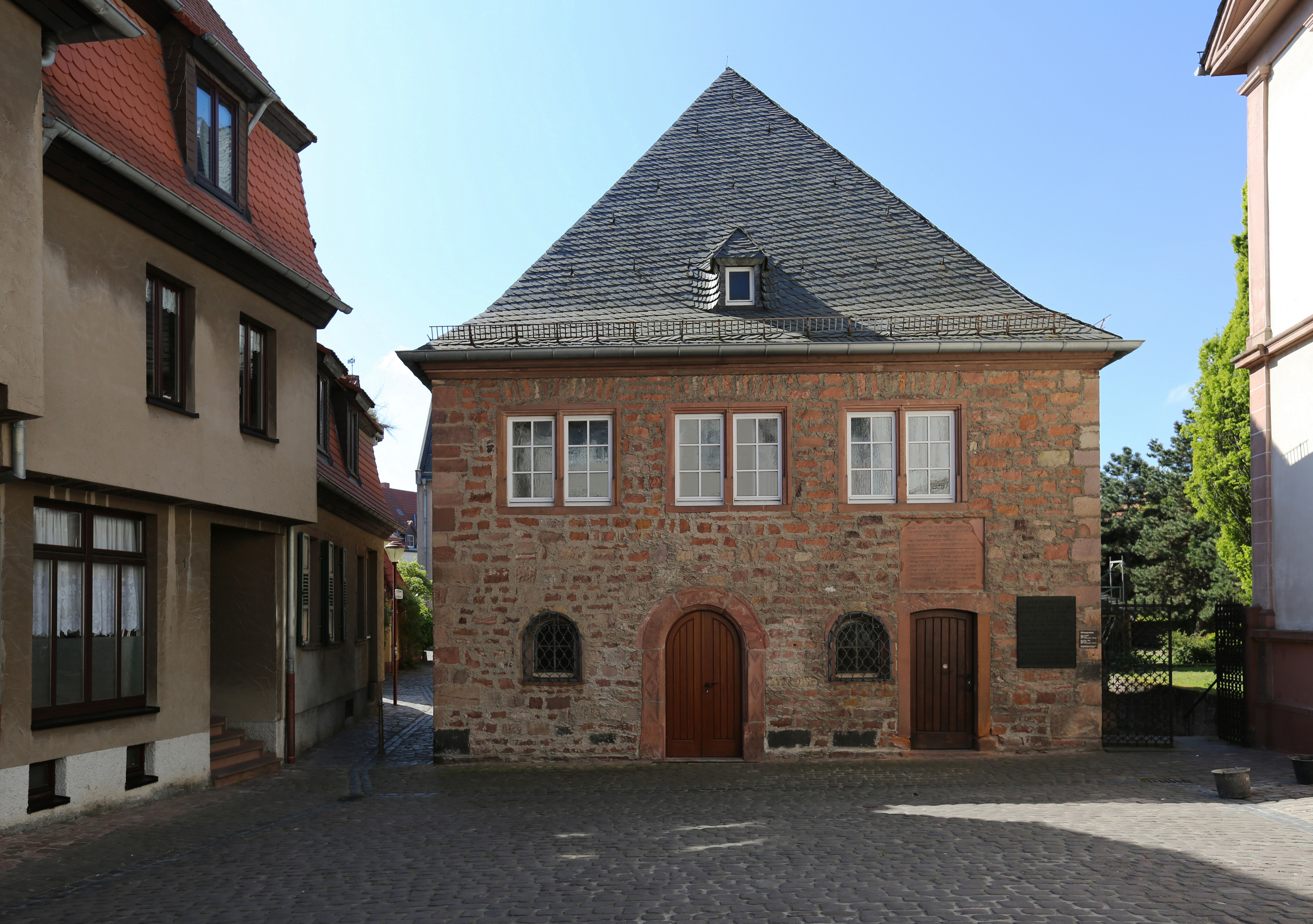
The Worms Synagogue, a World Heritage Site

== Samaritan synagogues ==
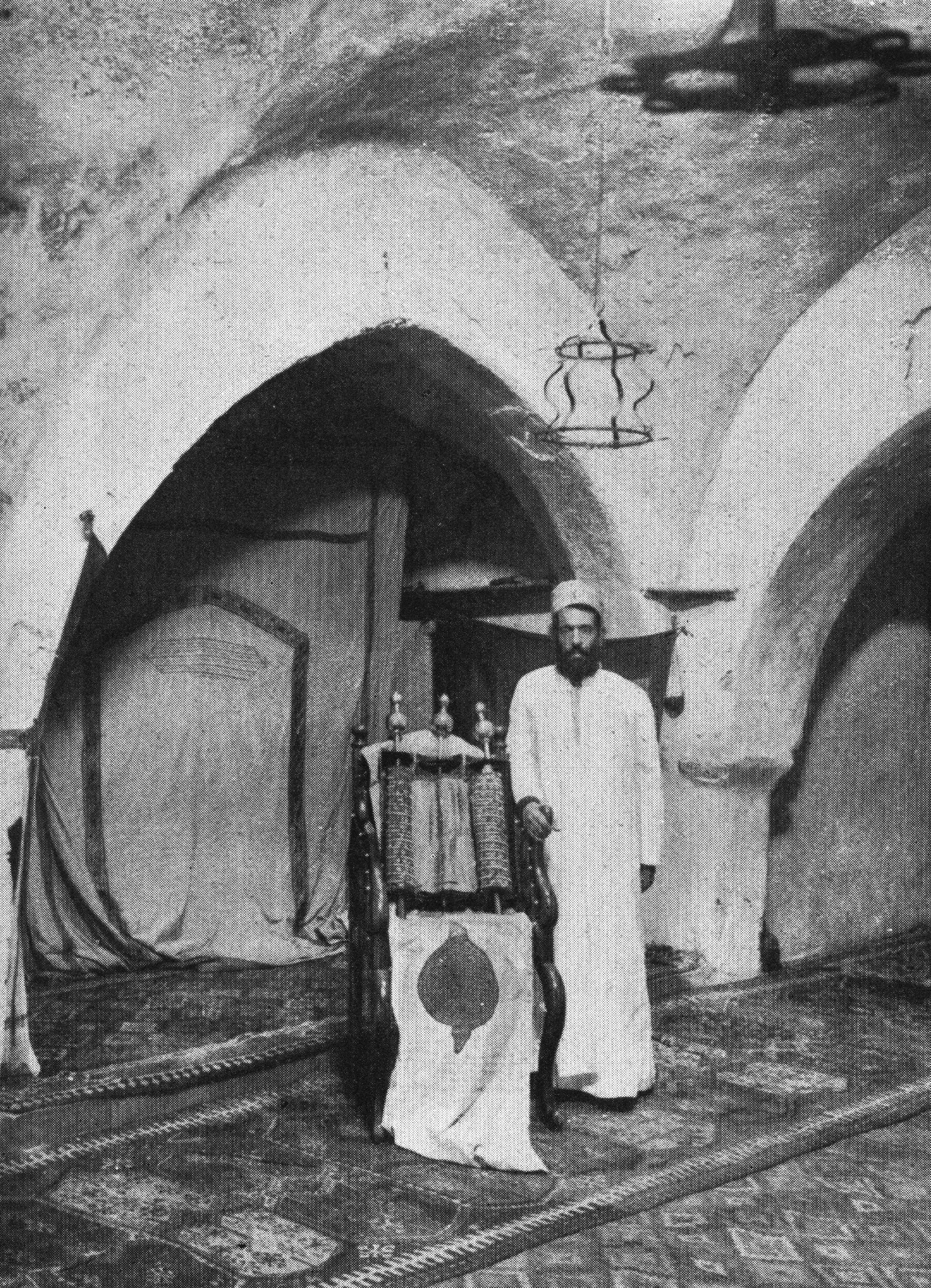
Interior of the Samaritan synagogue in Nablus circa 1920

=== Name and history ===
The Samaritan house of worship is also called a synagogue. During the third and second centuries BCE, the Hellenistic period, the Greek word used in the Diaspora by Samaritans and Jews was the same, proseukhē Koine Greek: προσευχή, lit. 'place of prayer', plural προσευχαί prosukhái); a third or fourth century inscription uses a similar term, εὑκτήριον euktērion.

The oldest Samaritan synagogue discovered so far is from Delos in the Aegean Islands, with an inscription dated between 250 and 175 BCE, while most Samaritan synagogues excavated in the wider Land of Israel and ancient Samaria in particular, were built in the fourth to seventh centuries at the very end of the Roman Empire and throughout the Byzantine period.

=== Distinguishing elements ===
The elements which distinguish Samaritan synagogues from contemporary Jewish ones are:

- Alphabet: the use of the Samaritan script
- Orthography: When the Samaritan script is used, there are some Hebrew words which would be spelled in a way typical only for the Samaritan Pentateuch, for instance, "forever" is written ʿlmw instead of lʿlm. When Greek is the language used in inscriptions, typically, Samaritans may contract two Hebrew words into one, such har "mountain" and Gerizim becoming Ancient Greek: Άργαρίζειν, romanized: Árgarízein. This is an archaic practice that was primarily maintained by Samaritans.
- Orientation: The façade, or entrance, of the Samaritan synagogue, typically faces Mount Gerizim, which is the holiest site to Samaritans, while Jewish synagogues are oriented towards Jerusalem and the Temple Mount.
- Decoration: The mosaic floor and other architectural elements or artifacts are sometimes decorated with typical symbols.
  - As the Samaritans have historically adhered more strictly to the commandment forbidding the creation of any "graven image", they would not use any depictions of man or beast. Representations of the signs of the zodiac, of human figures or even Greek deities such as the god Helios, as seen in Byzantine-period Jewish synagogues, would be unimaginable in Samaritan buildings of any period.
  - A representation of Mount Gerizim is a clear indication of Samaritan identity. On the other hand, although the existence of a Samaritan temple on Mount Gerizim is both mentioned by Josephus and confirmed by archaeological excavation at its summit, the temple's early destruction in the second century BCE led to its memory disappearing from Samaritan tradition. No temple-related items would be found in Samaritan synagogue depictions. Religious implements, such as are also known from ancient Jewish synagogue mosaics (the temple menorah, shofar, showbread table, trumpets, incense shovels, and specifically the façade of what looks like a temple or a Torah shrine) are also present in Samaritan ones, but the objects are always related to the Tabernacle, the Ark of the Covenant within the Tabernacle, or the Torah shrine in the synagogue itself. Samaritans believe that at the end of time, the Tabernacle and its utensils will be recovered from the place they were buried on Mount Gerizim, and as such they play an important role in Samaritan beliefs. Since the same artists, such as mosaicists, worked for all ethno-religious communities of the time, some depictions might be identical in Samaritan and Jewish synagogues, Christian churches, and pagan temples, but their significance would differ.
  - Missing from Samaritan synagogue floors would be images often found in Jewish ones: The lulav (palm-branch) and etrog (citron fruit) have a different ritual use by Samaritans celebrating Sukkot and do not appear on mosaic floors.
- Mikvehs near the synagogue after 70 CE: Jews abandoned the habit of building mikvehs next to their houses of worship after the 70 CE destruction of the Jerusalem Temple, but Samaritans continued the practice.

=== Archaeological finds ===
Ancient Samaritan synagogues are mentioned by literary sources or have been found by archaeologists in the Diaspora, in the wider Holy Land, and specifically in Samaria.

==== Diaspora ====
- Delos Synagogue: a Samaritan inscription has been dated to between 250 and 175 BCE.
- Rome and Tarsus: ancient literature offers hints that Samaritan synagogues may have existed in these cities between the fourth and sixth centuries CE.
- Thessaloniki and Syracuse: short inscriptions found there and using the Samaritan and Greek alphabet may originate from Samaritan synagogues.

==== The wider Holy Land ====
- Synagogue of Salbit (now Sha'alvim), excavated by Eleazar Sukenik in 1949 northwest of Jerusalem. It was about 8 by 15.5 metres (26 by 51 ft) in size, was two stories tall, and was oriented towards Mount Gerizim. Two mosaics remain, one atop the other; one contained the Samaritan version of the Song of the Sea in Exodus 15:18. It was probably built in the 4th or 5th century and destroyed in the 5th or 6th.
- The synagogue at Tell Qasile, which was built at the beginning of the seventh century.
- Synagogue A at Beit She'an (Beisan) was a room added to an existing building in the late 6th or early 7th century and served as a Samaritan synagogue. Beisan is famous for Synagogue B, the Beth Alpha synagogue, which faced Jerusalem and was not a Samaritan synagogue.

==== Samaria ====
- El-Khirbe synagogue, discovered c. 3 km from Sebaste, was built in the 4th century CE and remained in use into the Early Islamic period, with a break during the late 5th–early 6th century
- Khirbet Samara synagogue, c. 20 km northwest of Nablus and built in the 4th century CE
- Tzur Natan synagogue, c. 29 km west of Nablus and built in the 5th century CE

== Christianity ==
In the New Testament, the word appears 56 times, mostly in the Synoptic Gospels, but also in the Gospel of John (John 9:22; 18:20) and the Book of Revelation (Rev. 2:9; 3:9). It is used in the sense of 'assembly' in the Epistle of James (James 2:2). Alternatively, the epistle of James (in Greek, clearly Ἰάκωβος or יעקב, anglicized to Jacob) refers to a place of assembly that was indeed Jewish, with Jacob ben Joseph perhaps an elder there. The specific word in James (Jacob) 2:2 could easily be rendered "synagogue", from the Greek συναγωγὴν.

In 1995, Howard Clark Kee argued that synagogues were not a developed feature of Jewish life prior to the First Jewish–Roman War (66-73 CE) and that the mentions of synagogues in the New Testament, including Jesus's visitations of synagogues in various Jewish settlements in Israel, were anachronistic. However, archaeologists have discovered first-century synagogues, and Chris Keith and Anders Runesson find it almost certain that the historical Jesus preached in synagogues in Galilee.

During the first Christian centuries, Jewish Christians are hypothesized to have used houses of worship known in academic literature as synagogue-churches. Scholars have claimed to have identified such houses of worship of the Jews who had accepted Jesus as the Messiah in Jerusalem and Nazareth.

== Architectural design ==
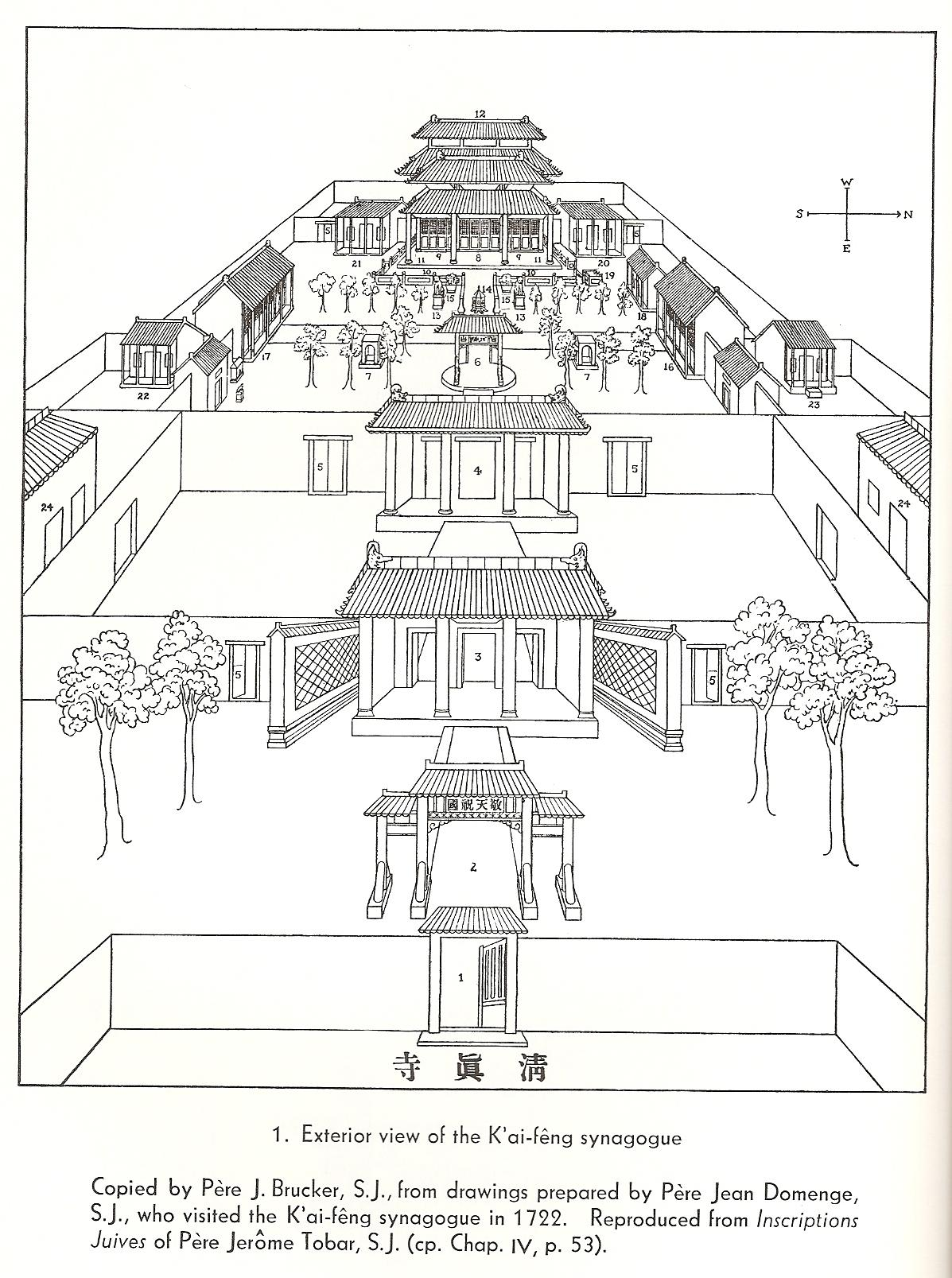
Aerial view of the synagogue of the Kaifeng Jewish community in China

There is no set blueprint for synagogues and the architectural shapes and interior designs of synagogues vary greatly. In fact, the influence from other local religious buildings can often be seen in synagogue arches, domes and towers.

Historically, synagogues were built in the prevailing architectural style of their time and place. Thus, the synagogue in Kaifeng, China, looked very much like Chinese temples of that region and era, with its outer wall and open garden in which several buildings were arranged. The styles of the earliest synagogues resembled the temples of other cults of the Eastern Roman Empire. The surviving synagogues of medieval Spain are embellished with mudéjar plasterwork. The surviving medieval synagogues in Budapest and Prague are typical Gothic structures.

With the emancipation of Jews in Western European countries in the 19th century—which not only enabled Jews to enter fields of enterprise from which they were formerly barred, but gave them the right to build synagogues without needing special permissions—synagogue architecture blossomed. Large Jewish communities wished to show not only their wealth but also their newly acquired status as citizens by constructing magnificent synagogues. These were built across Western Europe and in the United States in all of the historicist or revival styles then in fashion. Thus there were Neoclassical, Renaissance Revival architecture, Neo-Byzantine, Romanesque Revival, Moorish Revival, Gothic Revival, and Greek Revival. There are Egyptian Revival synagogues and even one Mayan Revival synagogue. In the 19th-century and early-20th-century heyday of historicist architecture, however, most historicist synagogues, even the most magnificent ones, did not attempt a pure style, or even any particular style, and are best described as eclectic.

In the post-war era, synagogue architecture abandoned historicist styles for modernism.

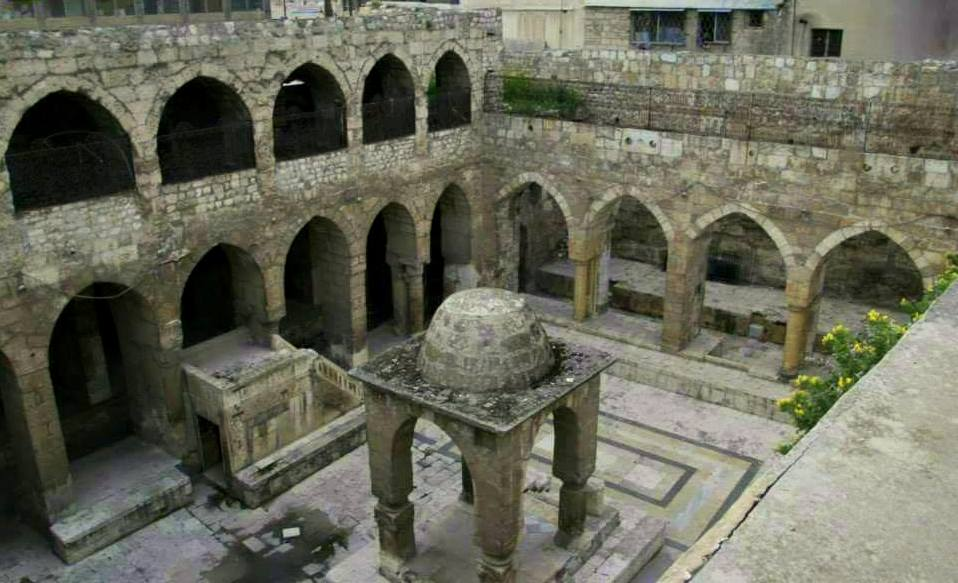
Central Synagogue of Aleppo, Aleppo, Syria (5th century)

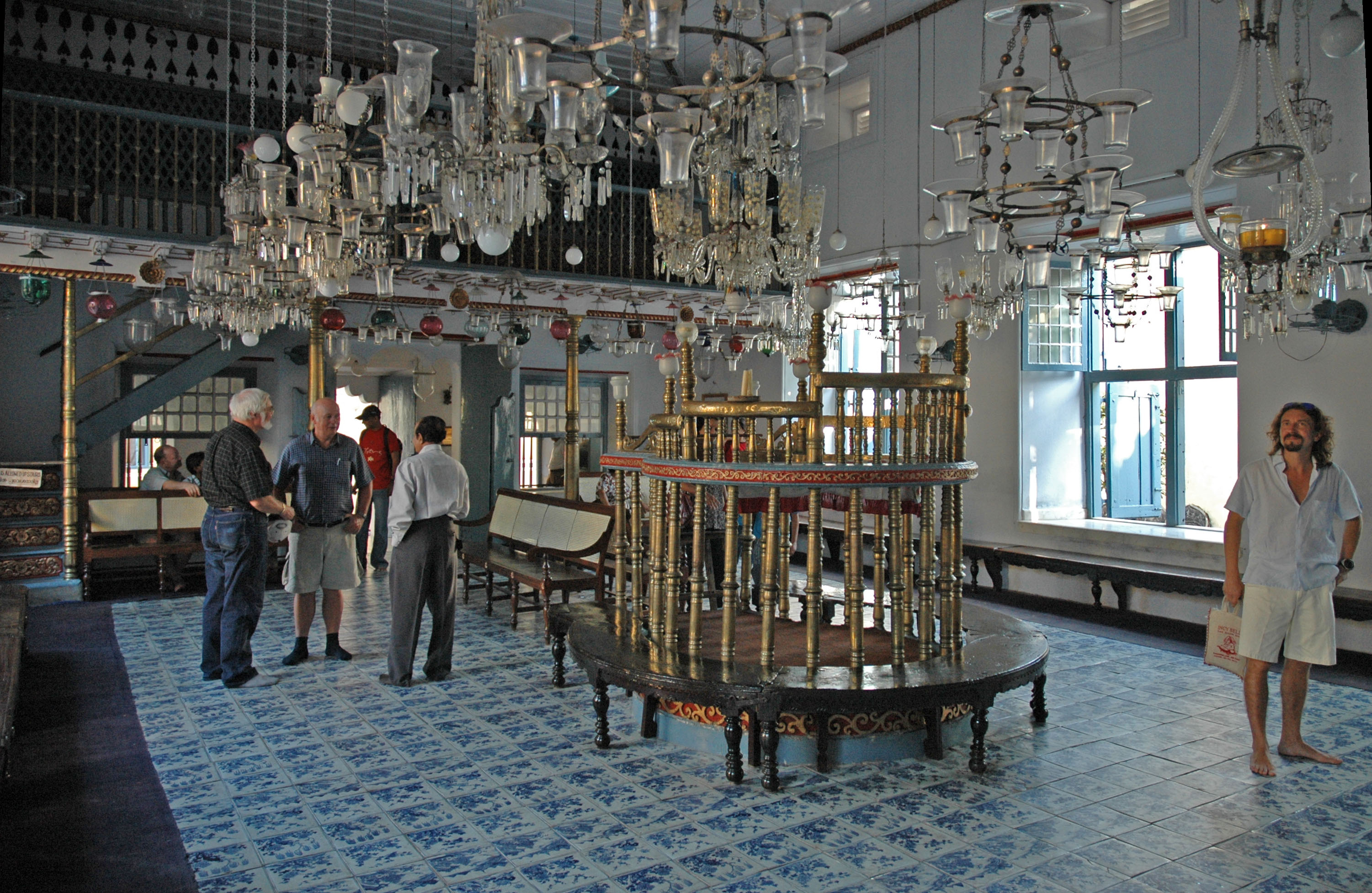
Paradesi Synagogue, Kochi, India (1568)

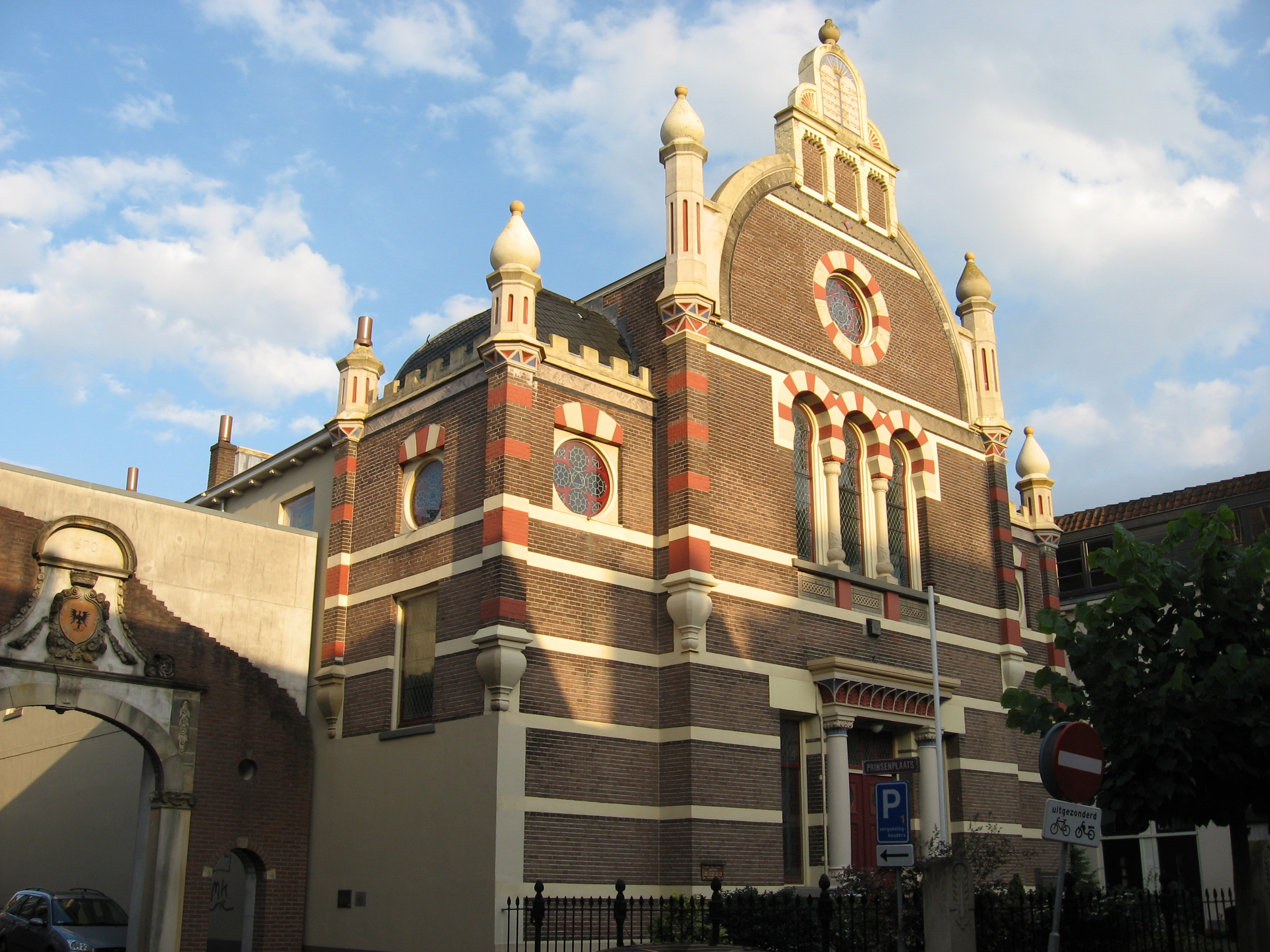
Great Synagogue of Deventer, Deventer, The Netherlands (1892)

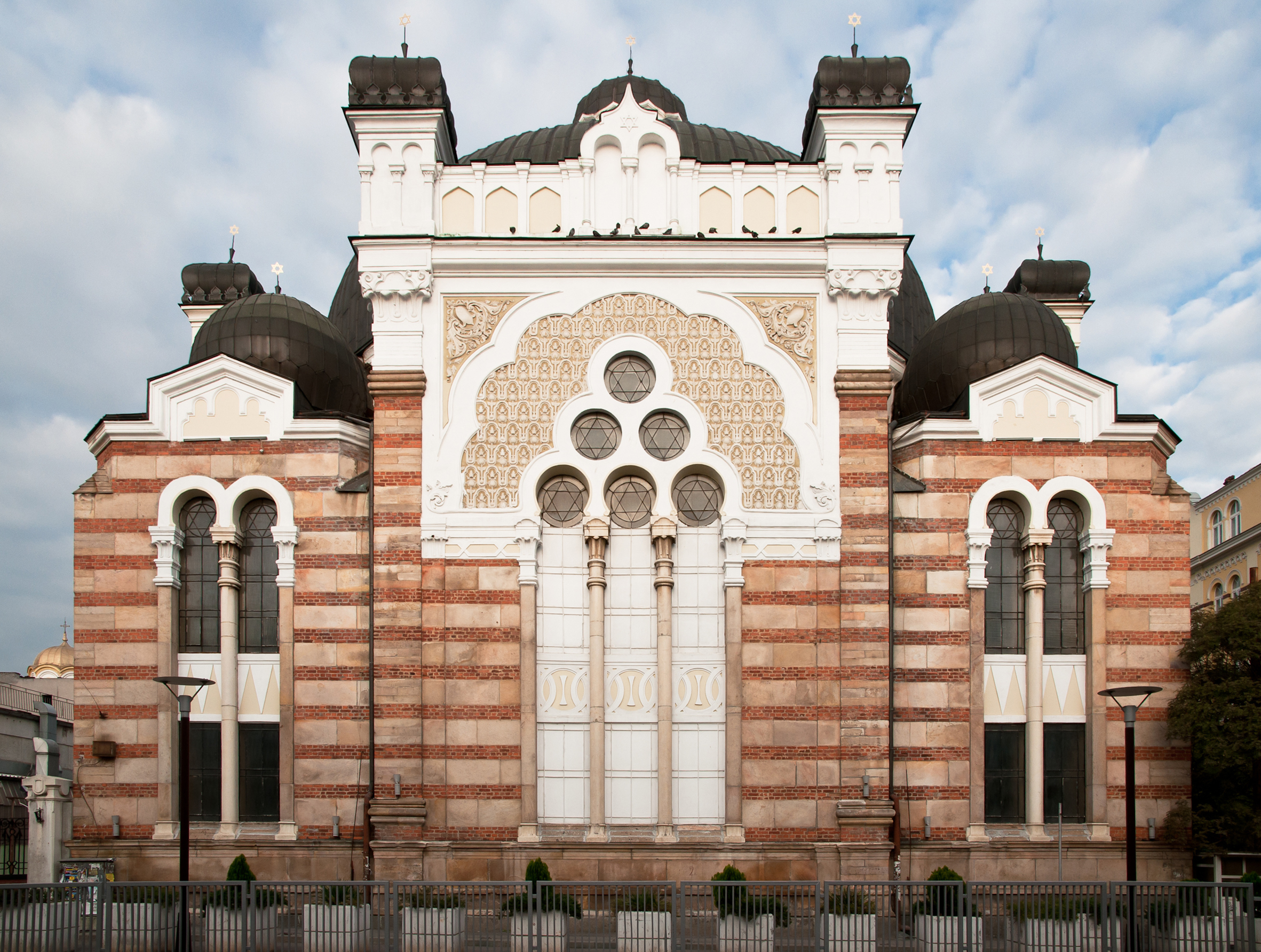
Sofia Synagogue, Sofia, Bulgaria (1909)

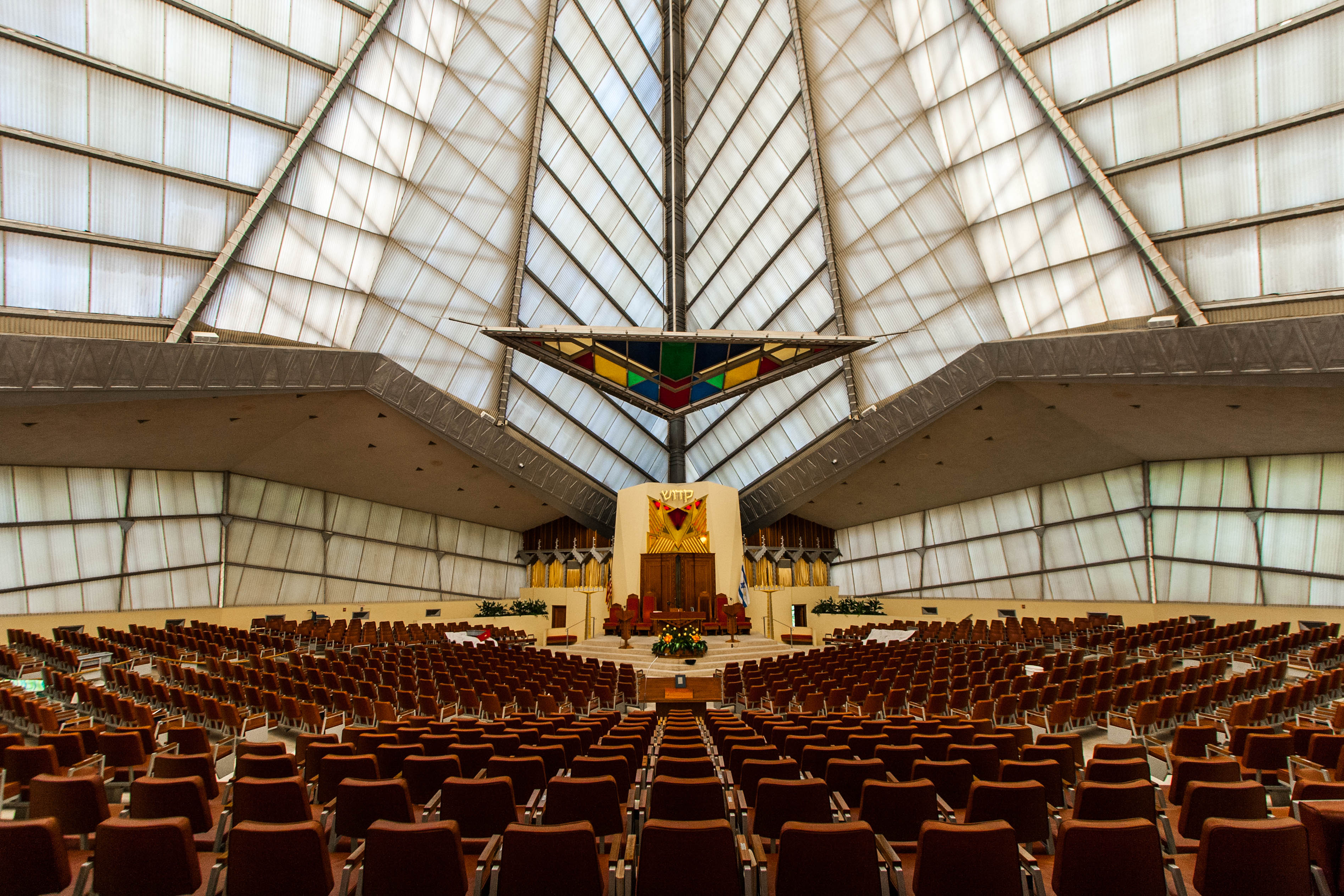
Beth Sholom Congregation, Elkins Park, US (1959)

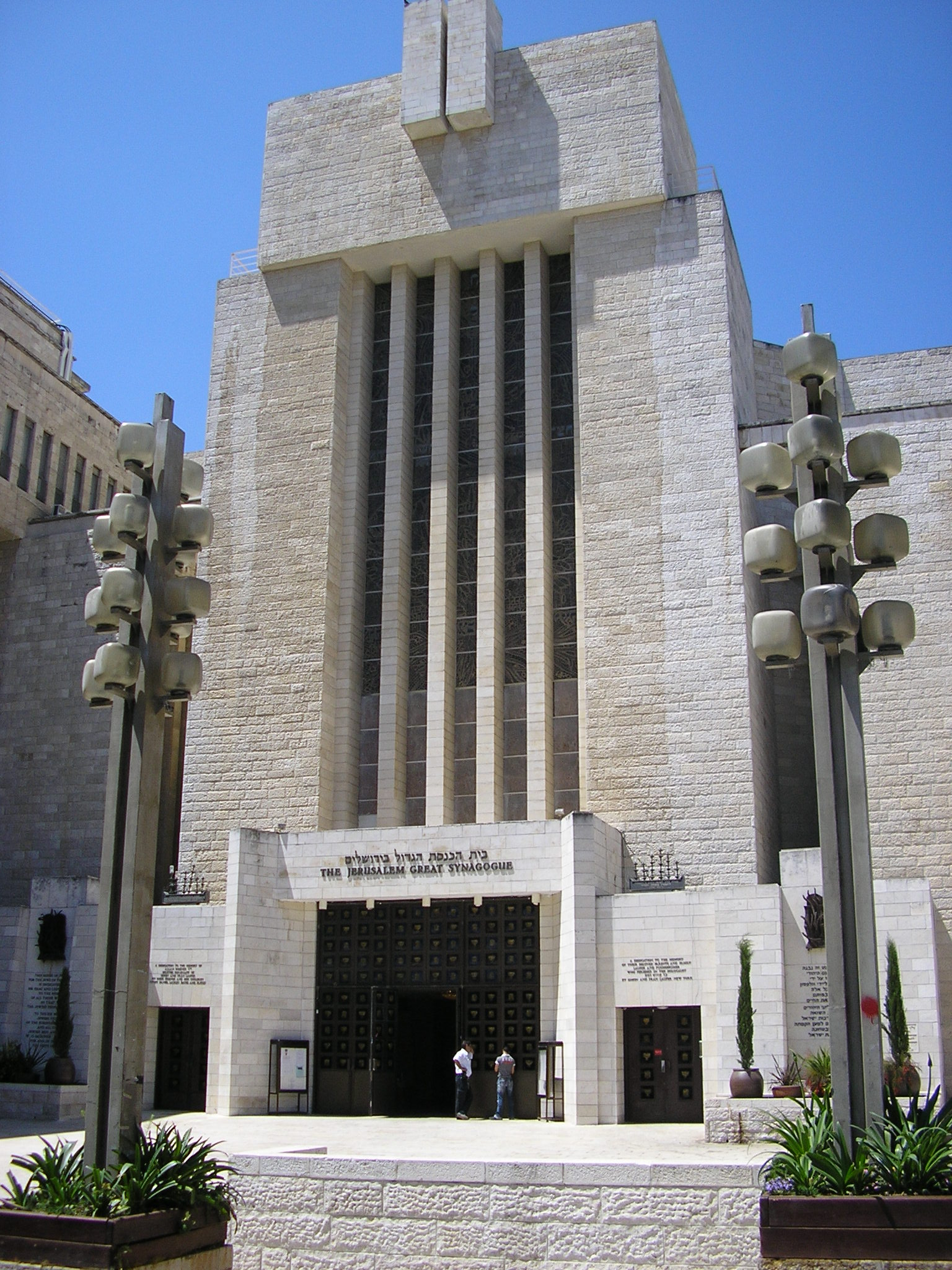
Great Synagogue of Jerusalem (1982)

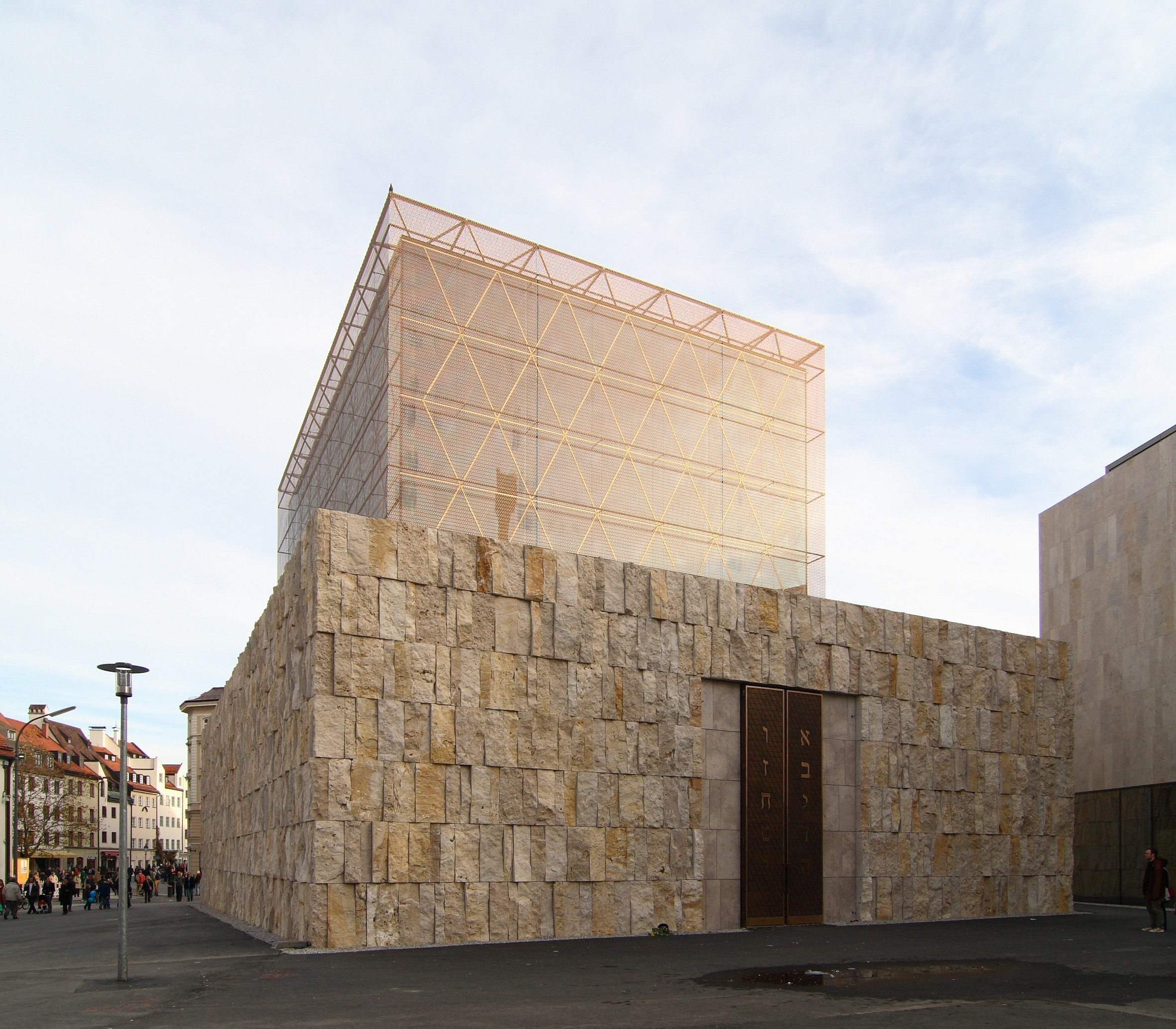
Ohel Jakob synagogue, Munich, Germany (2006)

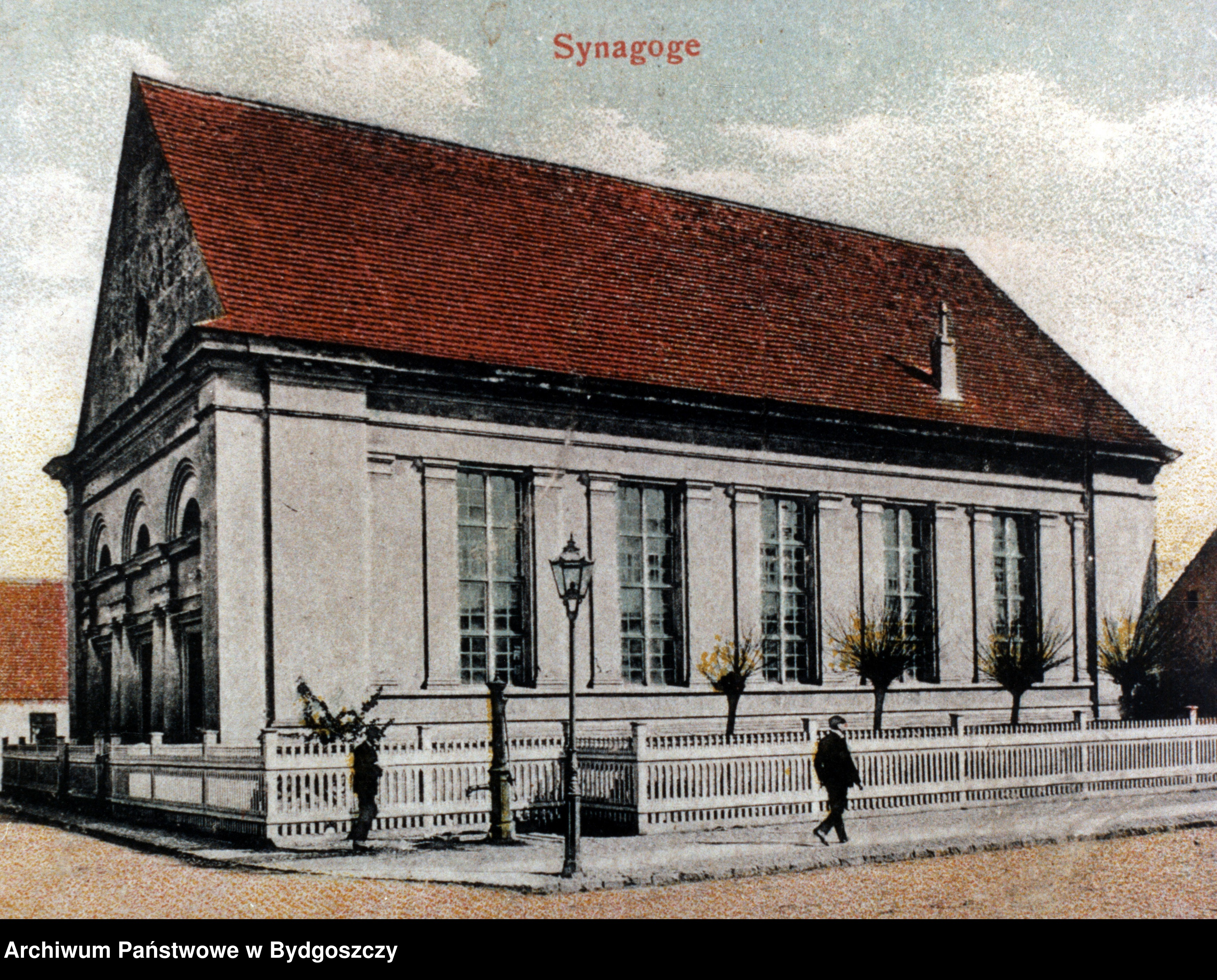
Synagogue of Fordon, Bydgoszcz, Poland (1905)

== Interior elements ==
=== Bimah ===
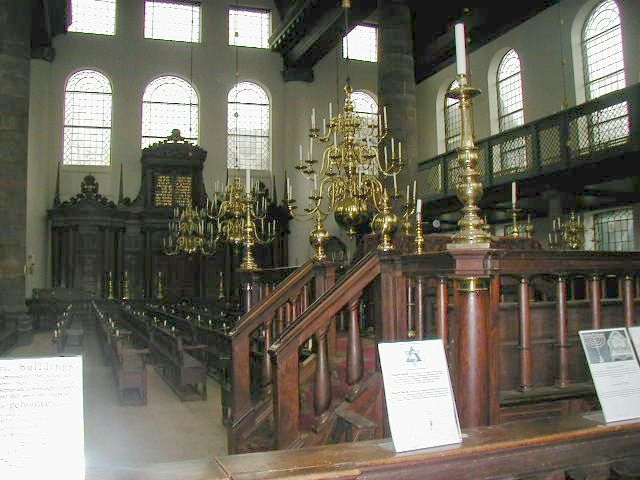
Interior of the Esnoga: the teba is in the foreground, and the Torah ark) in the background.

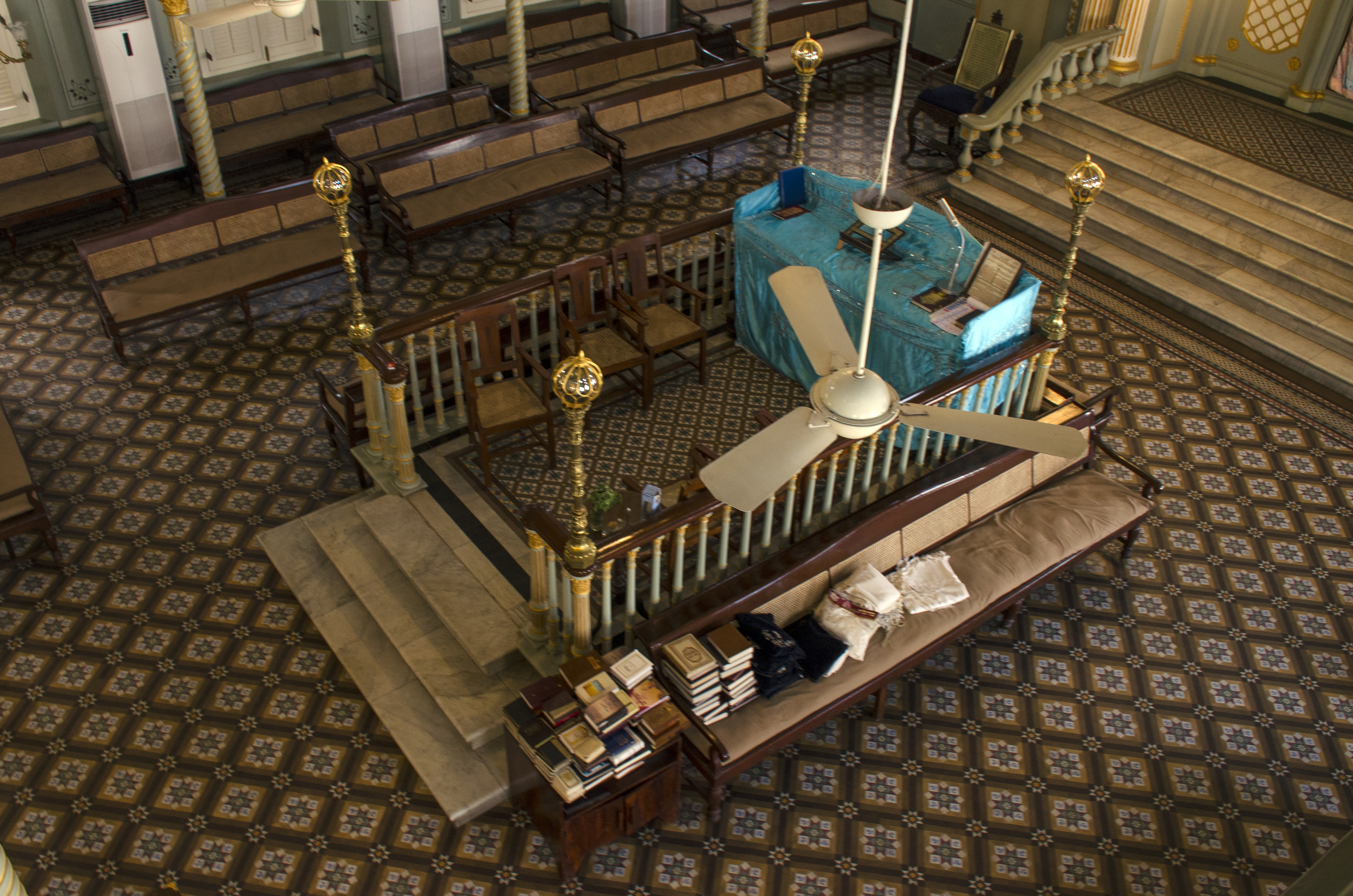
Bema of Knesset Eliyahoo Synagogue, Mumbai, India

All synagogues contain a bimah (Hebrew: בּימה, platform or pulpit; plural bimot), a large, raised, reader's platform, where the Torah scroll is placed to be read. In Sephardi synagogues and traditional Ashkenazi synagogues, it is also used as the prayer leader's reading desk.

The term is post-biblical Hebrew, and almost certainly derived from the Ancient Greek word for a raised platform, bema (βῆμα). A link to the Biblical Hebrew bama (בּמה), 'high place' has been suggested. It is also known as the almemar or almemor among some Ashkenazi Jews, from Arabic minbar "pulpit". Among Sephardic Jews, it is known as a tēḇāh (Hebrew: תֵּבָה, box or case) or migdal-etz ('tower of wood').

In Orthodox Judaism, the bimah is located in the center of the synagogue, separate from the Torah ark. In other branches of Judaism, the bimah and the ark are joined together.

The bimah is raised to demonstrate the importance of the Torah reader, and to make it easier to hear the recitation of the Torah. In antiquity, the bimah was made of stone, but in modern times it is usually a rectangular wooden platform approached by steps. Over time, it became a standard fixture in synagogues, where the weekly Torah portion and haftara are read. The platform is typically elevated by two or three steps, as in the ancient Temple. It will generally have a railing, which is a halakhic safety regulation for platforms more than ten handbreadths high, between 83 and 127 centimetres (2.72 and 4.17 ft). A lower bimah (even one step) will sometimes have a railing as a practical measure to prevent someone from stepping off inadvertently.

At the celebration of Shavuot, when synagogues are decorated with flowers, many synagogues have special arches that they place over the bima and adorn with floral displays.

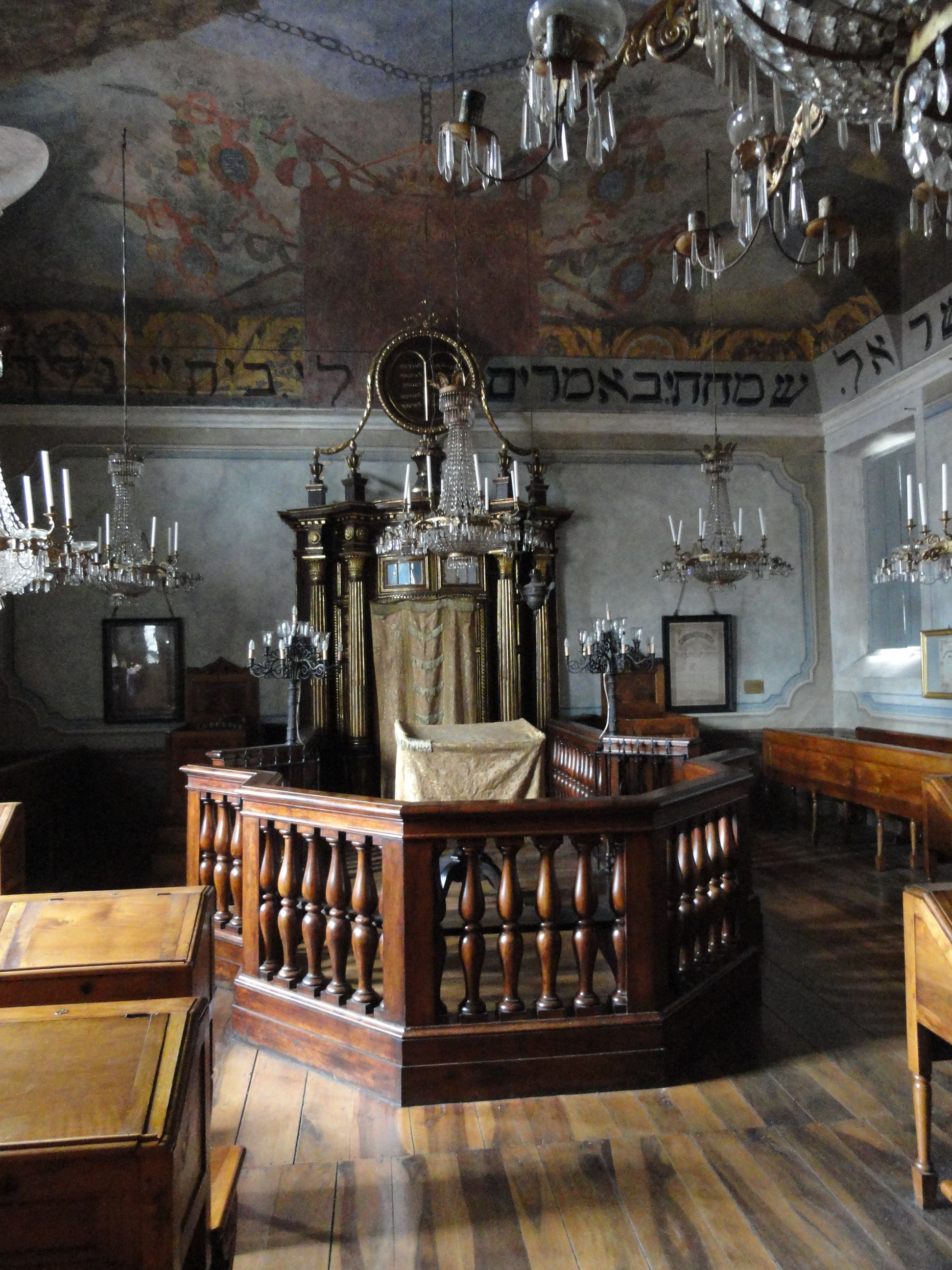
Bimah of the Saluzzo Synagogue, Saluzzo, Italy

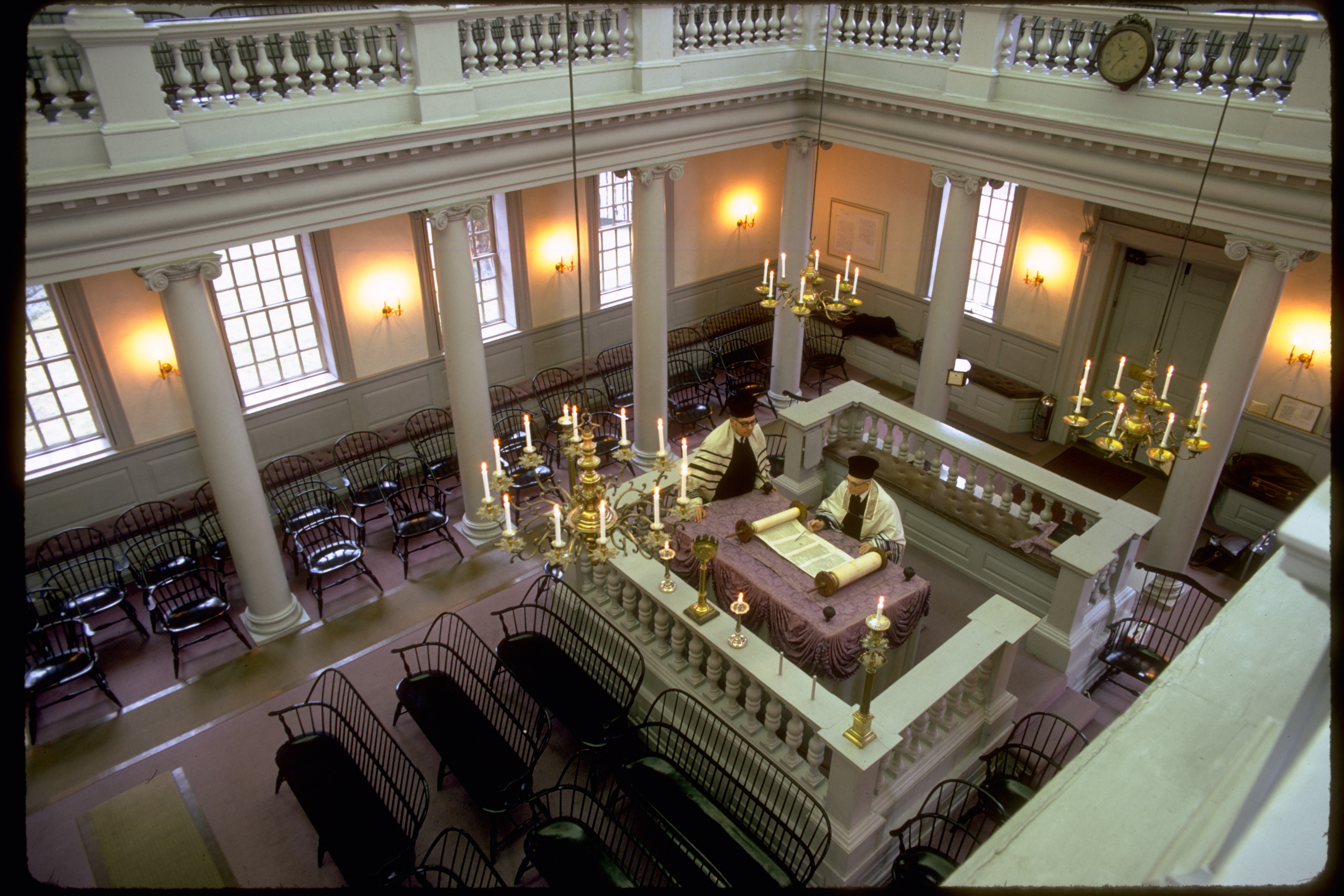
Bimah of the Touro Synagogue in Newport, Rhode Island, US

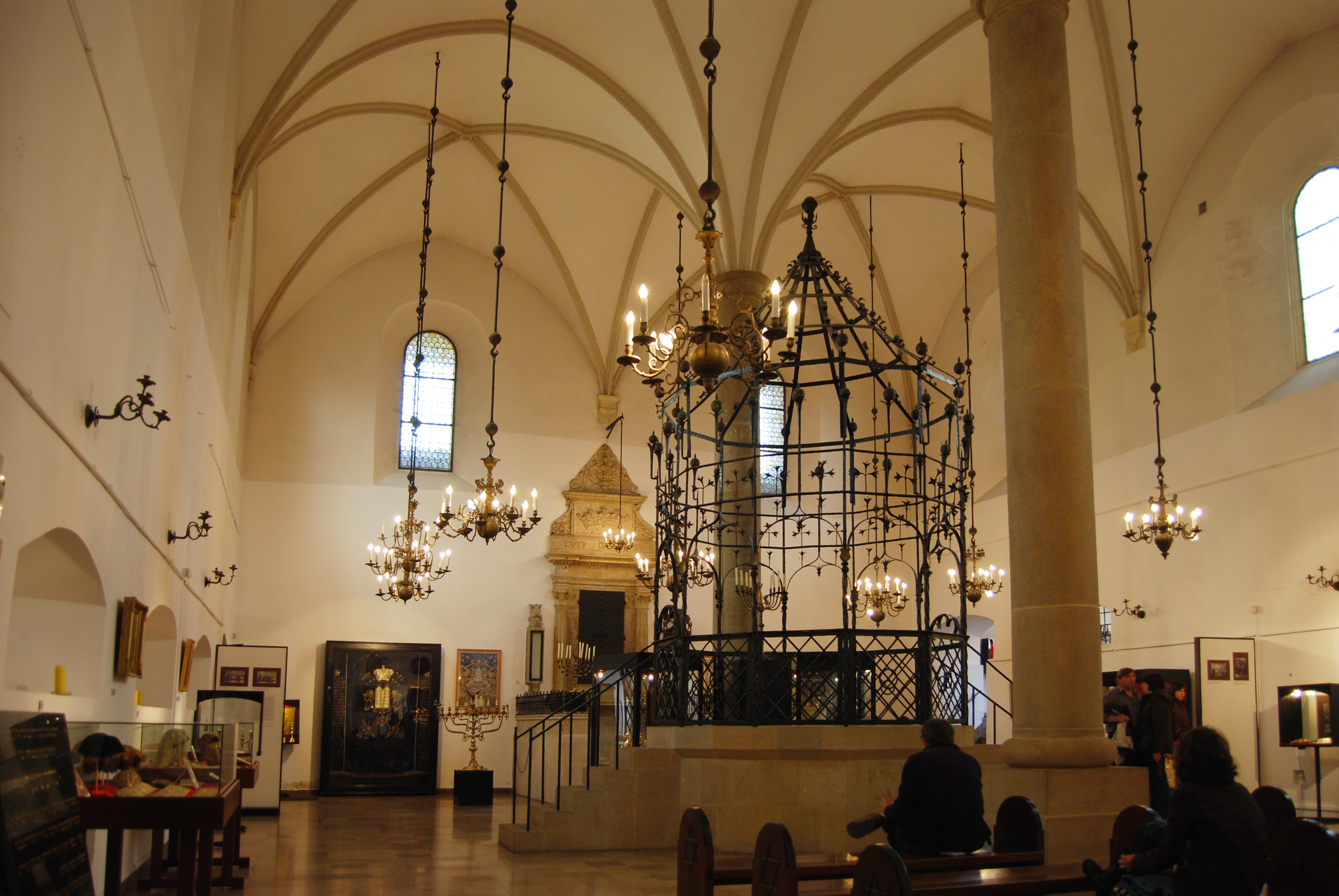
Cast-iron Bimah of the Old Synagogue in Kraków, Poland

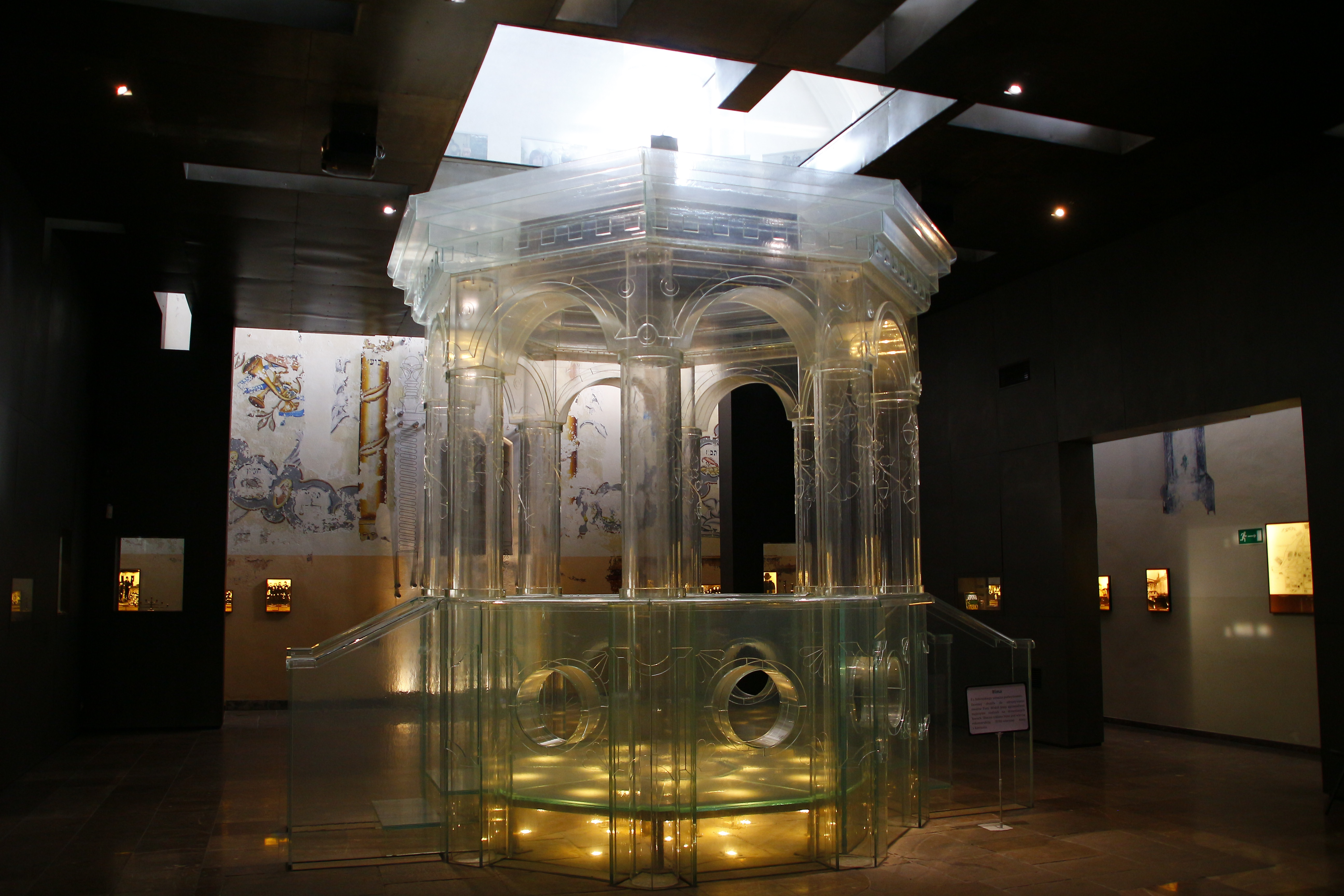
Reconstructed glass bimah of the Synagogue, Chmielnik, Poland

=== Table or lectern ===
In Ashkenazi synagogues, the Torah was read on a reader's table located in the center of the room, while the leader of the prayer service, the hazzan, stood at a lectern or table in the front, facing the Ark. In Sephardic synagogues, the table for reading the Torah (reading dais) was commonly placed at the opposite side of the room from the Torah Ark, leaving the center of the floor empty for the use of a ceremonial procession carrying the Torah between the Ark and the reading table. Most contemporary synagogues feature a lectern for the rabbi.

=== Torah Ark ===
The Torah Ark, called in Hebrew ארון קודש Aron Kodesh or 'holy chest' , and alternatively called the heikhal—היכל or 'temple' by Sephardic Jews, is a cabinet in which the Torah scrolls are kept.

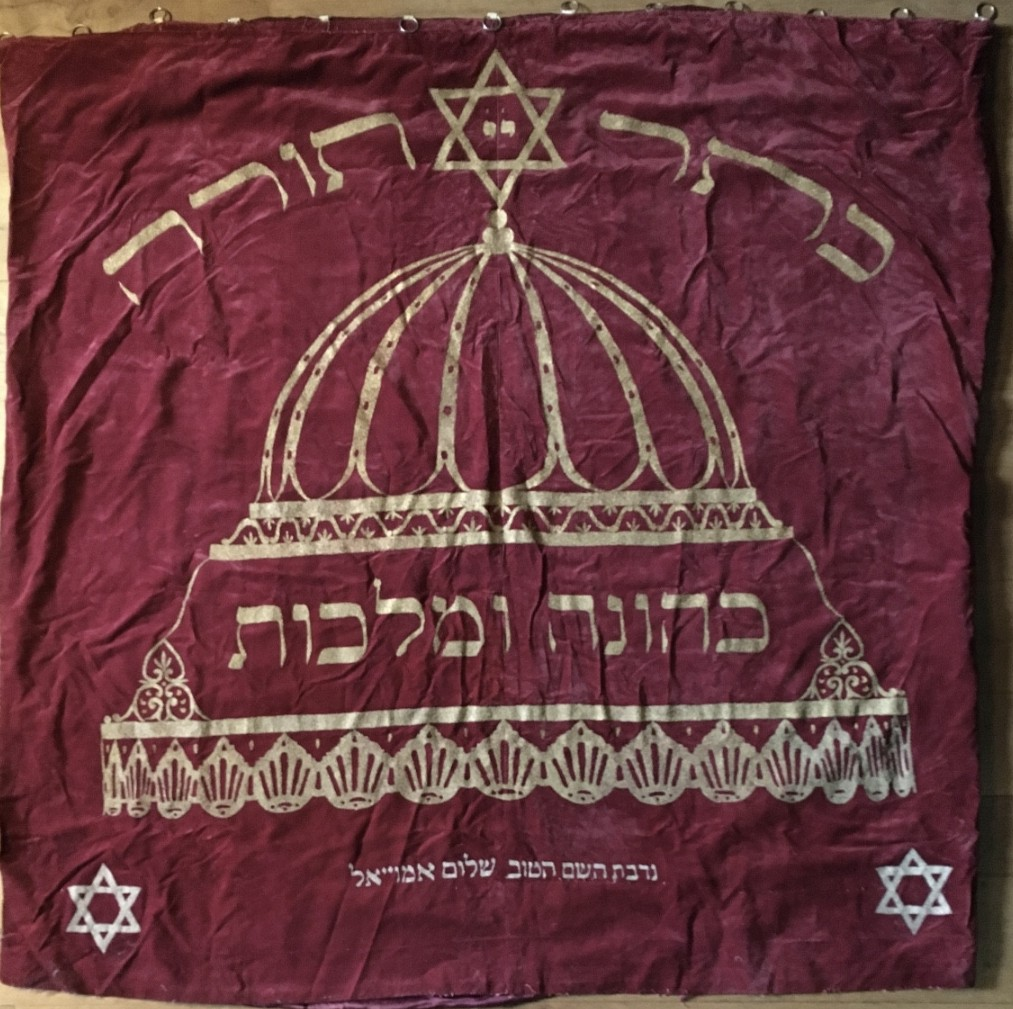
Portuguese Sephardic parochet covering a Torah ark, silk and metallic embroidery, c. 1760–1770, illustrating synagogue liturgical textile traditions.

The ark in a synagogue is almost always positioned in such a way such that those who face it are facing towards Jerusalem. Thus, sanctuary seating plans in the Western world generally face east, while those east of Israel face west. Sanctuaries in Israel face towards Jerusalem and in Jerusalem towards the Temple Mount. Occasionally, synagogues face other directions for structural reasons; in such cases, some individuals might turn to face Jerusalem when standing for prayers, but the congregation as a whole does not.

The Ark is reminiscent of the Ark of the Covenant, which held the tablets inscribed with the Ten Commandments. This is the holiest spot in a synagogue, also reminiscent of the Holy of Holies. The Ark is often closed with an ornate curtain, the parochet פרוכת, which hangs outside or inside the ark doors.

=== Eternal Light ===
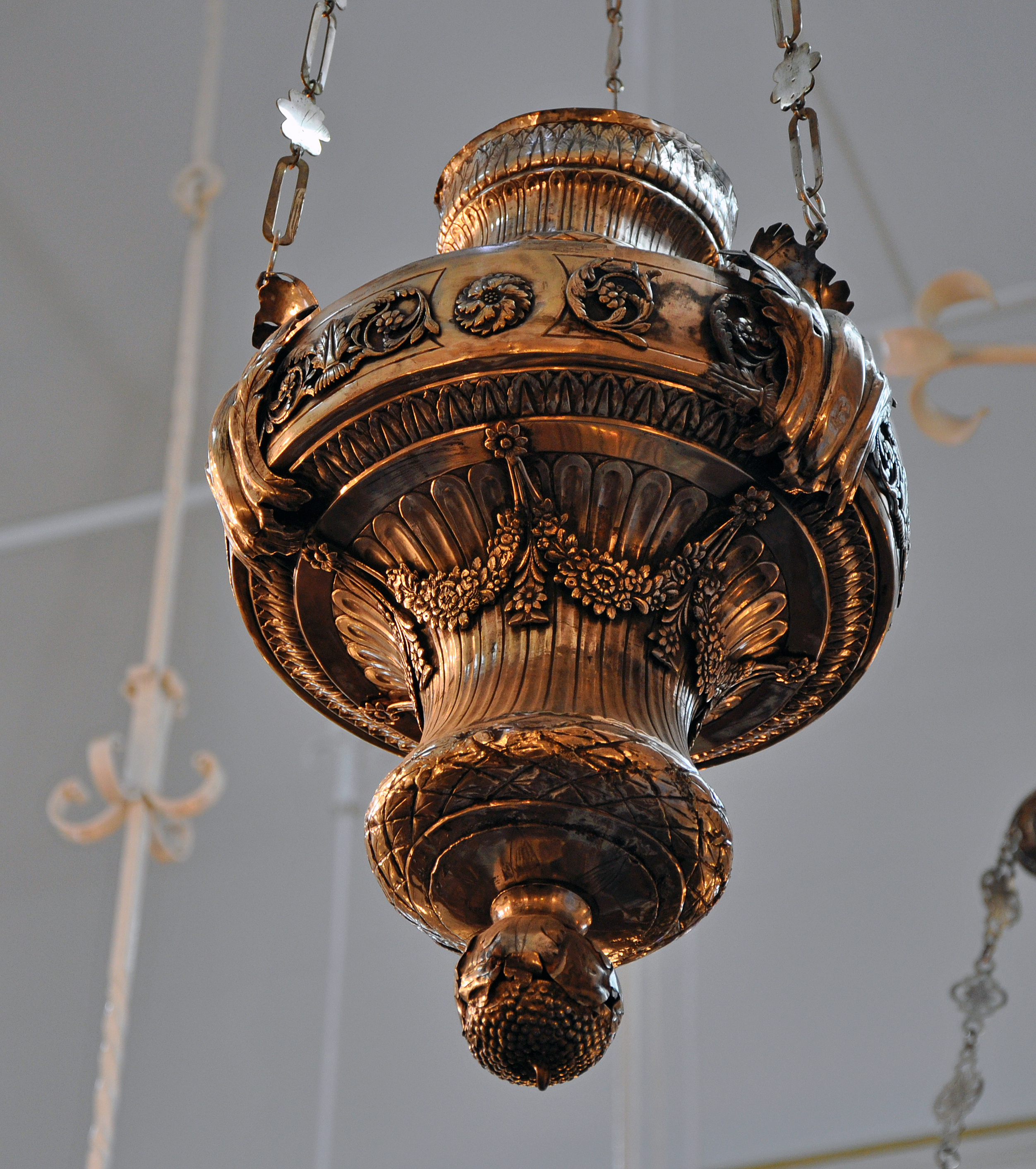
Ner tamid of the Abudarham Synagogue in Gibraltar

Other traditional features include a continually lit lamp or lantern, usually electric in contemporary synagogues, called the ner tamid (נר תמיד), the "Eternal Light", used as a way to honor the Divine Presence.

=== Inner decoration ===
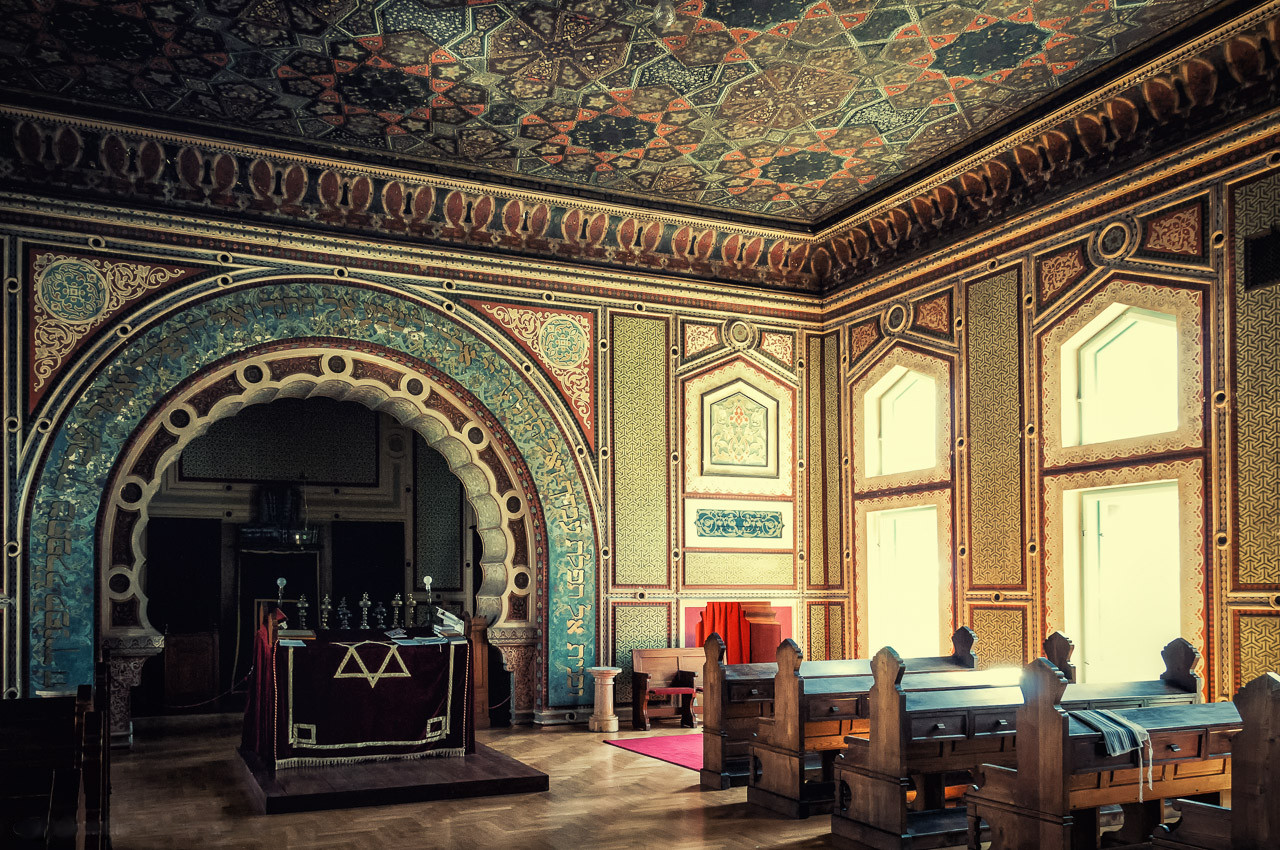
Sarajevo Synagogue, Sarajevo, Bosnia and Herzegovina (1902)

A synagogue may be decorated with artwork, but in the Rabbinic and Orthodox tradition, three-dimensional sculptures and depictions of the human body are not allowed as these are considered akin to idolatry.

=== Seating ===
Originally, synagogues were made devoid of much furniture; Jewish congregants in Spain, the Maghreb (North Africa), Babylonia, the Land of Israel and Yemen had a custom to sit upon the floor, which had been strewn with mats and cushions, rather than upon chairs or benches. In other European towns and cities, however, Jewish congregants would sit upon chairs and benches. The latter custom has become more universal across Jewish communities in recent years.

In an Ashkenazi synagogue, all seats most often face the Torah Ark, meaning that congregants sit in rows. In a Sephardic synagogue, seats are usually arranged around the perimeter of the sanctuary, but during the main prayer, Amidah, everyone faces the Ark.

=== Special seats ===
Many current synagogues have an elaborate chair named for the prophet Elijah, which is only sat upon during the ceremony of brit milah.

In ancient synagogues, a special chair placed on the wall facing Jerusalem and next to the Torah Shrine was reserved for the prominent members of the congregation and for important guests. Such a stone-carved and inscribed seat was discovered at archaeological excavations in the synagogue at Chorazin in Galilee and dates from the 4th–6th century; another one was discovered at the Delos Synagogue, complete with a footstool.

== Rules for attendees ==
=== Removing one's shoes ===
In Yemen, the Jewish custom was to remove one's shoes immediately prior to entering the synagogue, a custom that had been observed by Jews in other places in earlier times. The same practice of removing one's shoes before entering the synagogue was also largely observed among Jews in Morocco in the early 20th century. On the island of Djerba in Tunisia, Jews still remove their shoes when entering a synagogue. The custom of removing one's shoes is no longer practiced in Israel, the United Kingdom, or the United States, and which custom, as in former times, was dependent upon whether or not the wearer considered it a thing of contempt to stand before God while wearing shoes. In Christian countries, where it was thought not offensive to stand before a king while wearing shoes, it was likewise permitted to do so in a house of prayer. However, in Karaite Judaism, the custom of removing one's shoes prior to entering a synagogue is still observed worldwide.

=== Gender separation ===
In Orthodox synagogues, men and women do not sit together. The synagogue features a partition (mechitza) dividing the men's and women's seating areas, or a separate women's section located on a balcony.

== Denominational differences ==
=== Reform Judaism ===
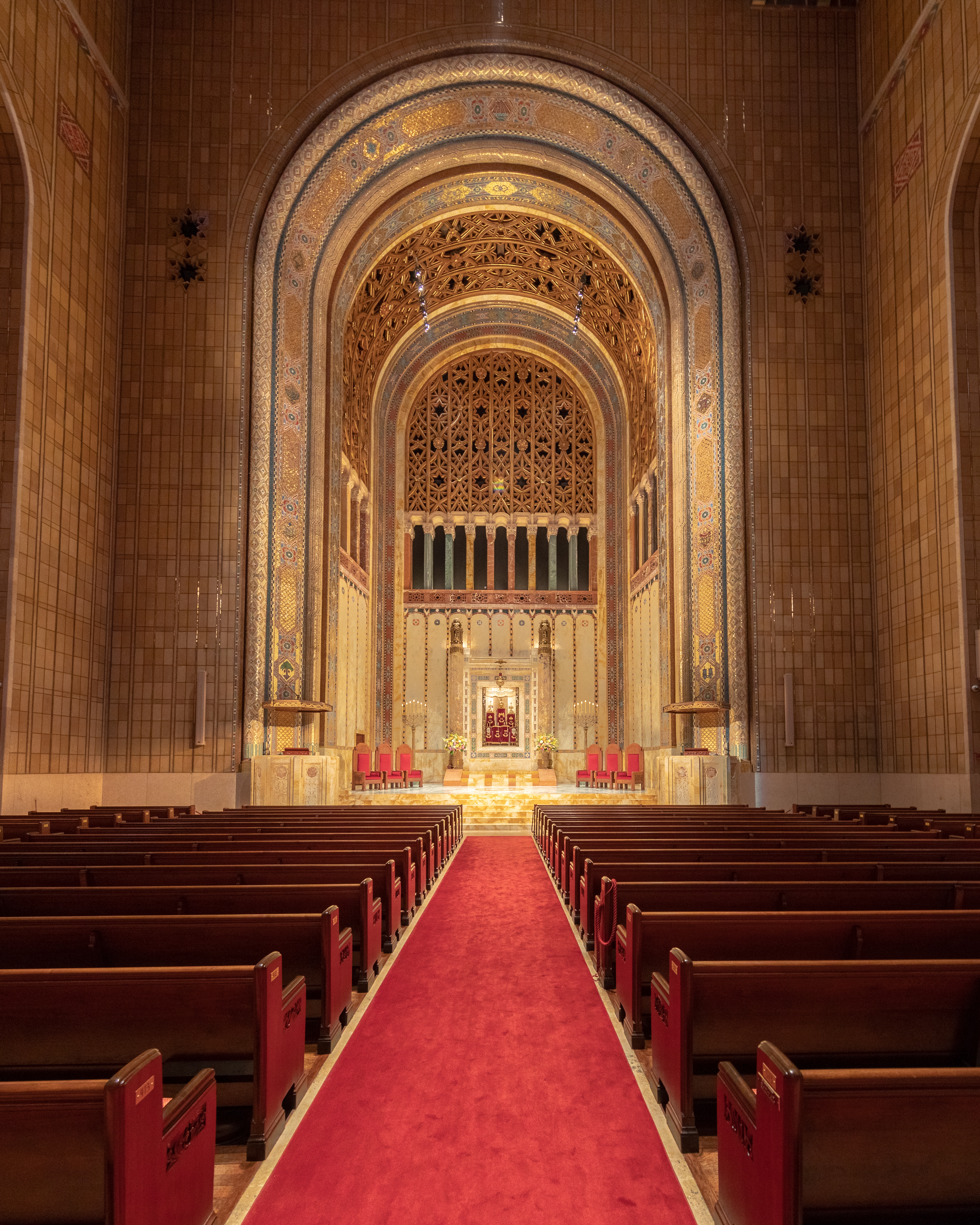
Congregation Emanu-El of New York

The German–Jewish Reform movement, which arose in the early 19th century, made many changes to the traditional look of the synagogue, keeping with its desire to simultaneously stay Jewish yet be accepted by the surrounding culture.

The first Reform synagogue, which opened in Hamburg in 1811, introduced changes that made the synagogue look more like a church. These included: the installation of an organ to accompany the prayers (even on Shabbat, when musical instruments are proscribed by halakha), a choir to accompany the hazzan, and vestments for the synagogue rabbi to wear.

In following decades, the central reader's table, the Bimah, was moved to the front of the Reform sanctuary—previously unheard-of in Orthodox synagogues.

Gender separation was also removed.

=== Conservative Judaism ===
The Conservative/Masorti movement, which arose in the late 19th century, had its own changes to the synagogue. While most authorities were uncomfortable with the inclusion of organs in the synagogue. they found merit in the removal of gender separation and other Reform movement alterations.

== Synagogue as community center ==
Synagogues often take on a broader role in modern Jewish communities and may include additional facilities such as a catering hall, kosher kitchen, religious school, library, day care center and a smaller chapel for daily services.

== Synagogue offshoots ==
Since many Orthodox and some non-Orthodox Jews prefer to collect a minyan (a quorum of ten adults) rather than pray alone, they commonly assemble at pre-arranged times in offices, living rooms, or other spaces when these are more convenient than formal synagogue buildings. A room or building that is used this way can become a dedicated small synagogue or prayer room. Among Ashkenazi Jews they are traditionally called shtiebel (שטיבל, pl. shtiebelekh or shtiebels, Yiddish for "little house"), and are found in Orthodox communities worldwide.

Another type of communal prayer group, favored by some contemporary Jews, is the chavurah (חבורה, pl. chavurot, חבורות), or prayer fellowship. These groups meet at a regular place and time, either in a private home or in a synagogue or other institutional space. In antiquity, the Pharisees lived near each other in chavurot and dined together to ensure that none of the food was unfit for consumption.

== List of synagogues ==
=== Africa ===
==== Morocco ====
- The Temple Beth-El, Casablanca
- The Al Fassiyine Synagogue, Fes
- The Rabbi Shalom Zaoui Synagogue, Rabat

==== South Africa ====
- The Doornfontein Synagogue, New Doornfontein, Johannesburg
- The Gardens Shul, Cape Town
- The Stellenbosch Synagogue, Stellenbosch

==== Tunisia ====
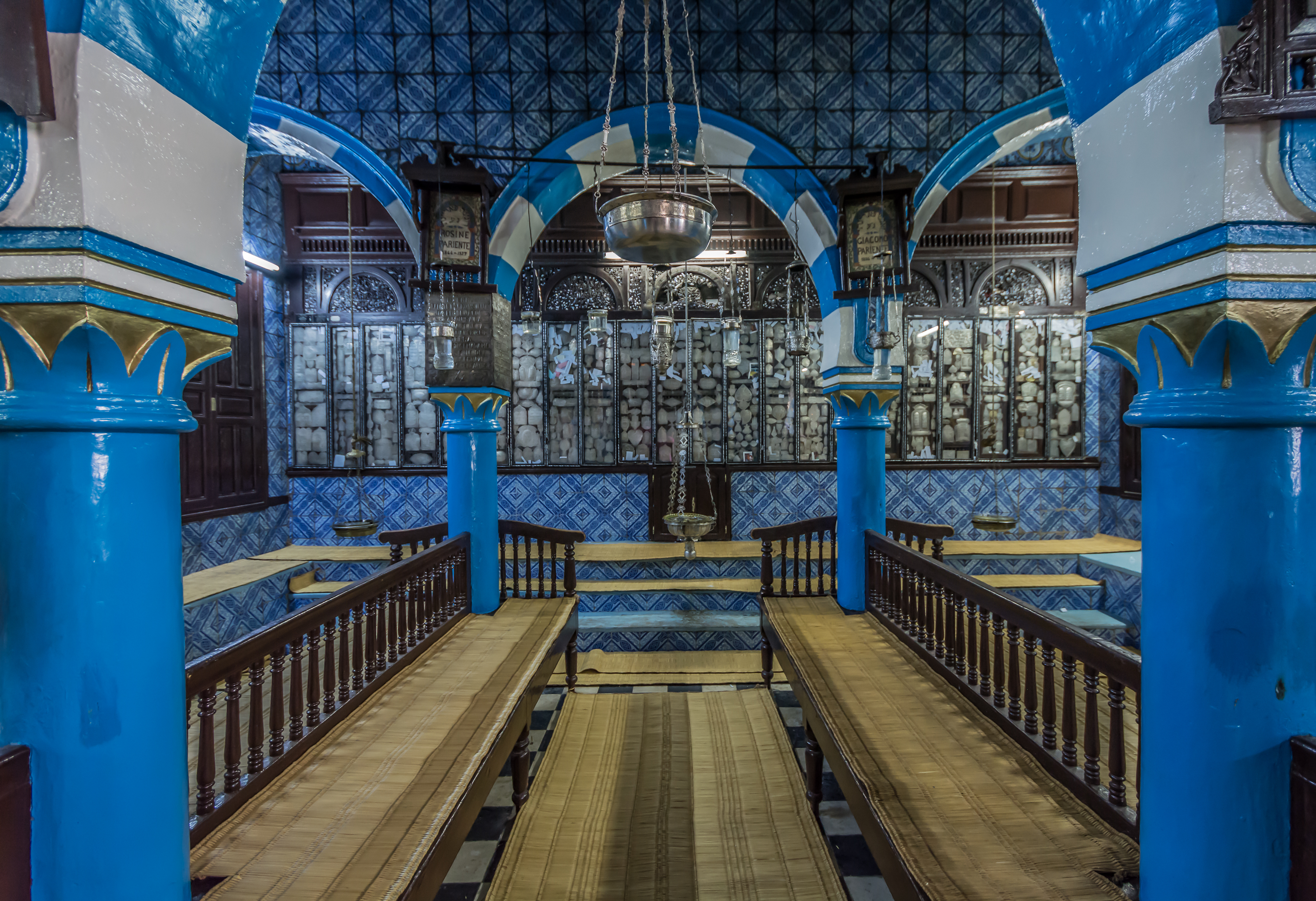
Interior of the El Ghriba Synagogue in Tunisia. The synagogue appears to be the oldest synagogue in the world.

- The Grand Synagogue of Tunis
- The El Ghriba synagogue of Djerba

=== America ===
==== Argentina ====
- The Synagogue of the Israelite Argentine Congregation in Buenos Aires

==== Barbados ====
- The Nidhe Israel Synagogue, in Bridgetown, built in 1654. It is one of the oldest synagogues in the Western hemisphere.

==== Brazil ====
- The Beth El Synagogue of São Paulo.

==== Canada ====
- The Machzikei Hadas of Ottawa, Ontario
- The Beth Jacob V'Anshei Drildz, Toronto, Ontario
- The Bagg Street Shul in Montreal, Quebec

==== Mexico ====
- The Nidjei Israel in Mexico City

==== United States ====
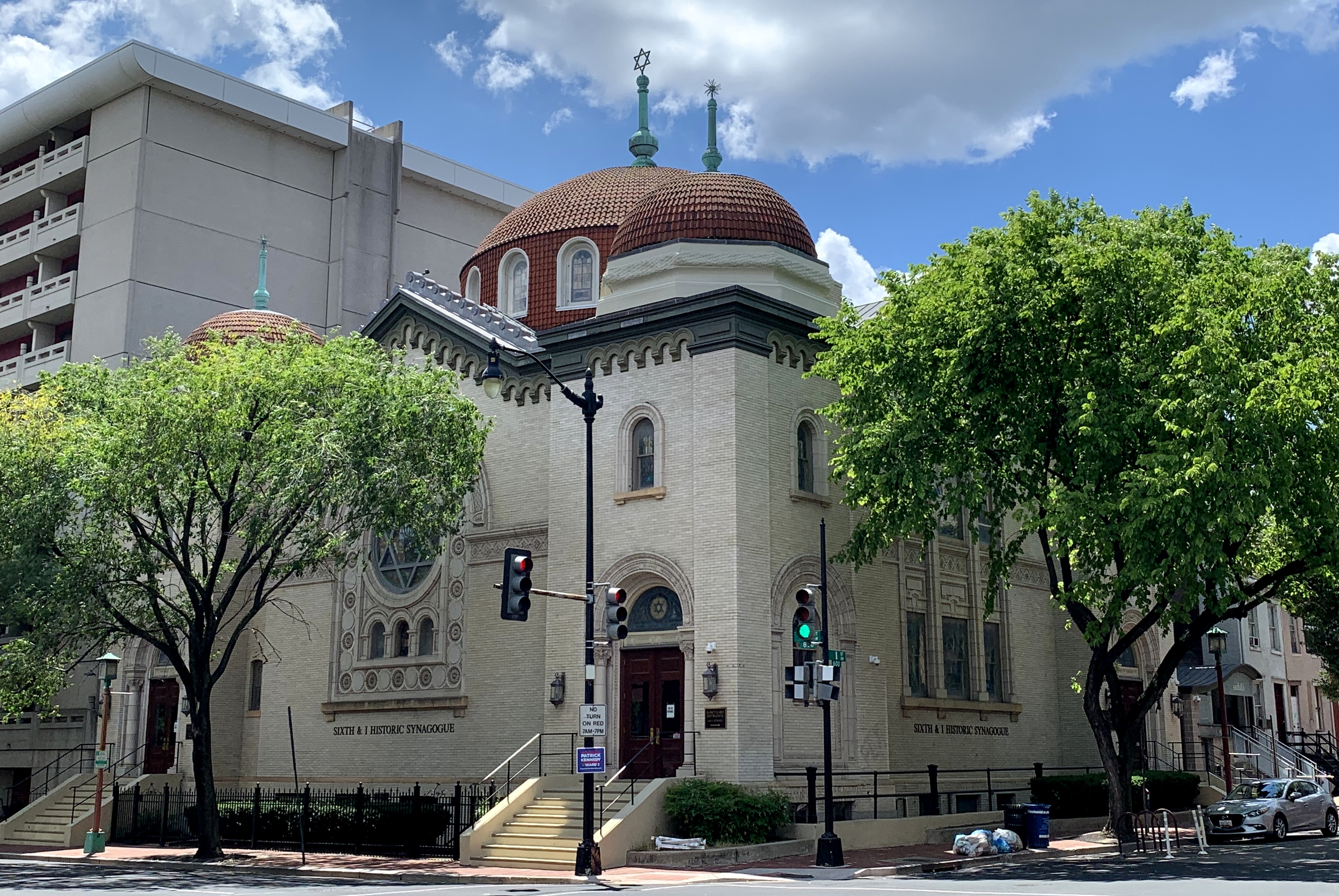
The Sixth & I Historic Synagogue in Washington, D.C., US It is one of the oldest synagogues in the city.

- The Sixth & I Historic Synagogue, Washington, D.C.
- The Temple B'nai Sholom in Huntsville, Alabama
- The Temple Emanuel in Beverly Hills, California
- The Congregation Mickve Israel in Savannah, Georgia

==== Uruguay ====
- The Synagogue of the Sephardic Jewish Community in Montevideo, Uruguay.

=== Asia ===
==== Azerbaijan ====
- The Synagogue of the Ashkenazi Jews, Baku
- The Six Dome Synagogue, Gyrmyzy Gasaba (now a part of the local jewish museum)

==== Georgia ====
- The Great Synagogue in Tbilisi

==== India ====
- The Magen Abraham Synagogue, Ahmedabad, Gujarat
- The Knesset Eliyahoo Synagogue, Mumbai, Maharashtra
- The Kadavumbhagam Ernakulam Synagogue, Kochi, Kerala

==== Iran ====
- The Yusef Abad Synagogue, in Tehran.
- The Rafi'-Nia synagogue, in Tehran. The building was destroyed in 2026 during the 2026 Iran war.

==== Israel ====
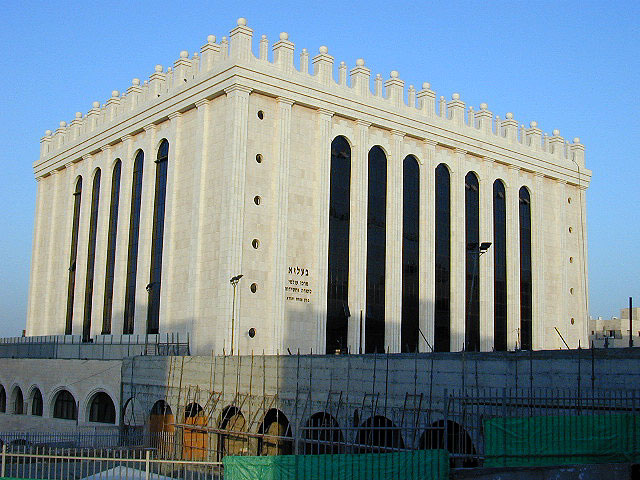
The Belz Great Synagogue in Jerusalem

- The Belz Great Synagogue, Jerusalem
- The Great Synagogue of Jerusalem
- The Or Torah Synagogue, Acre

==== Palestine ====
- The Jericho synagogue, built in the Byzantine Empire-era and is believed to date from the late 6th or early 7th century CE and was discovered in 1936.
- The Gaza synagogue, Built in the early 6th century during the Byzantine period, it was destroyed by fire in the first half of the 7th century.

==== Turkey ====
- The Ashkenazi Synagogue of Istanbul
- The Grand Synagogue of Edirne
- The Signora Giveret Synagogue in İzmir

=== Europe ===
Studies undertaken at the Hebrew University of Jerusalem have identified 3,347 historic synagogues in Europe. Just over a quarter of these have been assessed by the Foundation for Jewish Heritage as buildings at risk because of their building condition.

==== Austria ====
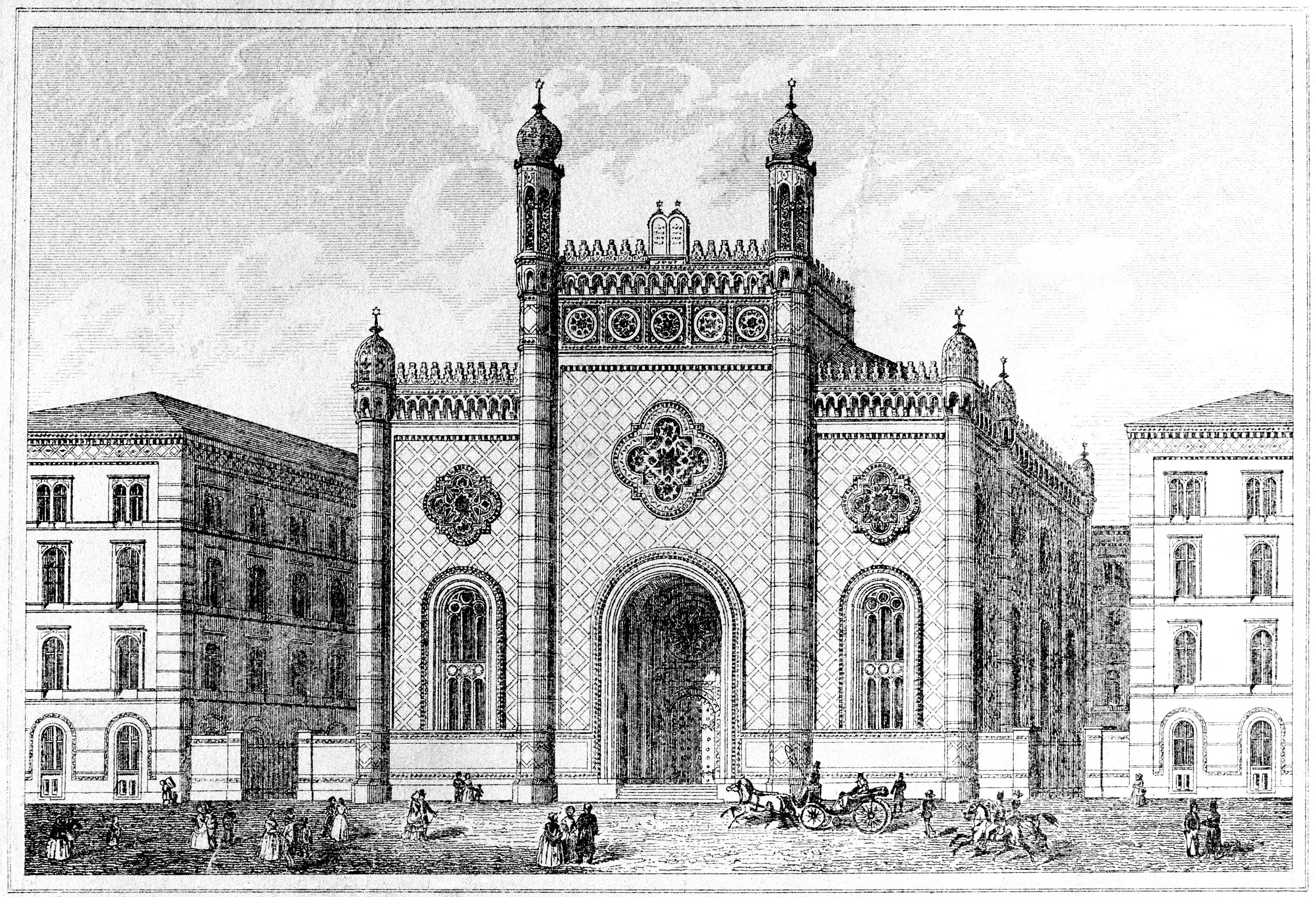
An image of the Leopoldstädter Tempel in 1858

- The Leopoldstädter Tempel of Vienna, destroyed during the "Kristallnacht" pogrom. The building served as model for many other important synagogues.

==== Bosnia and Herzegovina ====
- The Synagogue of Sarajevo
- The Synagogue of Doboj

==== Bulgaria ====
- The Synagogue of Sofia

==== Czech Republic ====
- The Great Synagogue of Plzeň

==== France and Belgium ====
- The Grand Synagogue of Paris
- The Great Synagogue of Brussels (also known as the Great Synagogue of Europe)

==== Germany ====
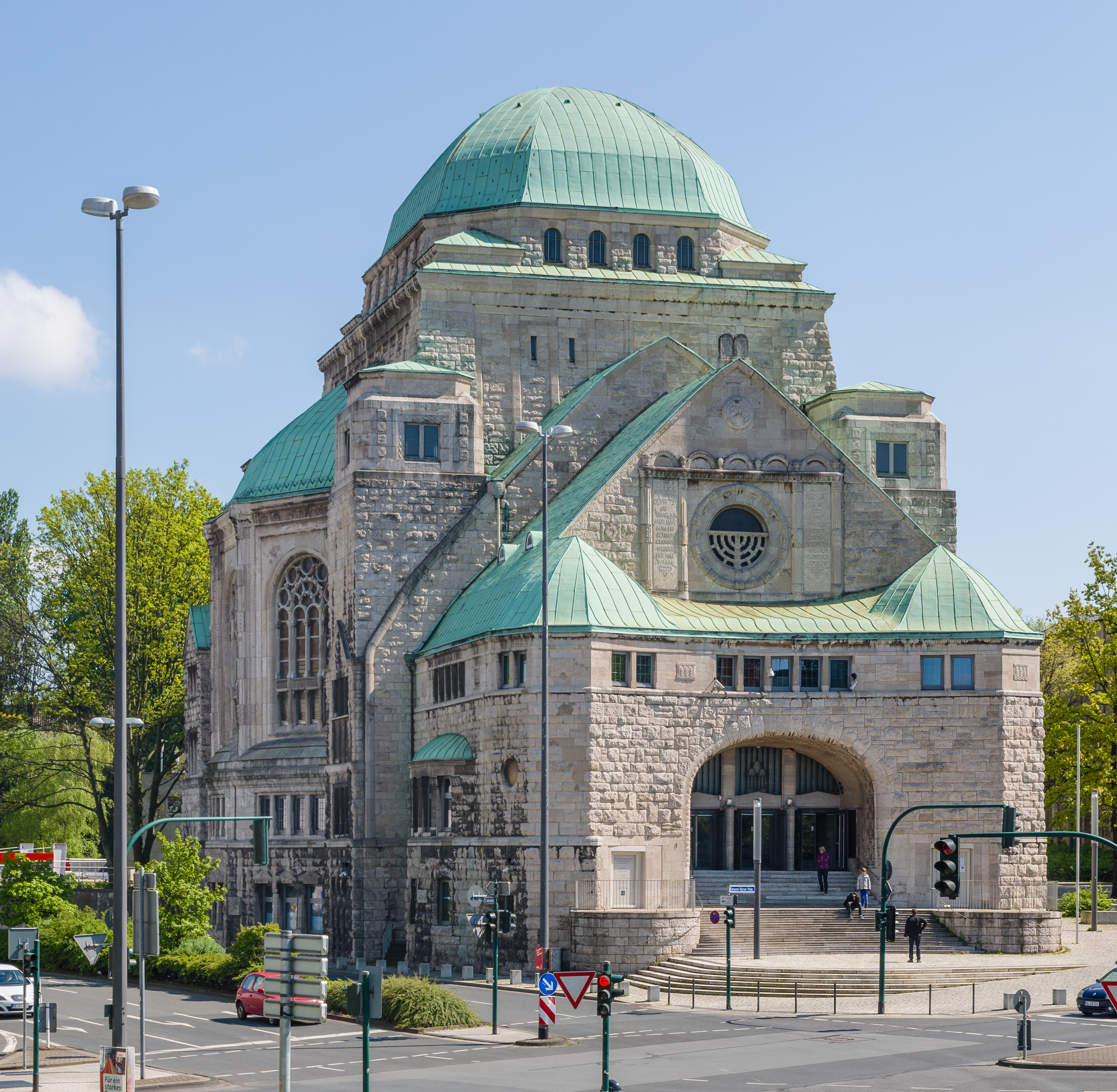
The old Synagogue of Essen, Germany, was repurposed in 1960 as a Jewish museum.

- The New Synagogue of Berlin
- The Old Synagogue (Erfurt)
- The Old Synagogue (Essen)

==== Hungary ====
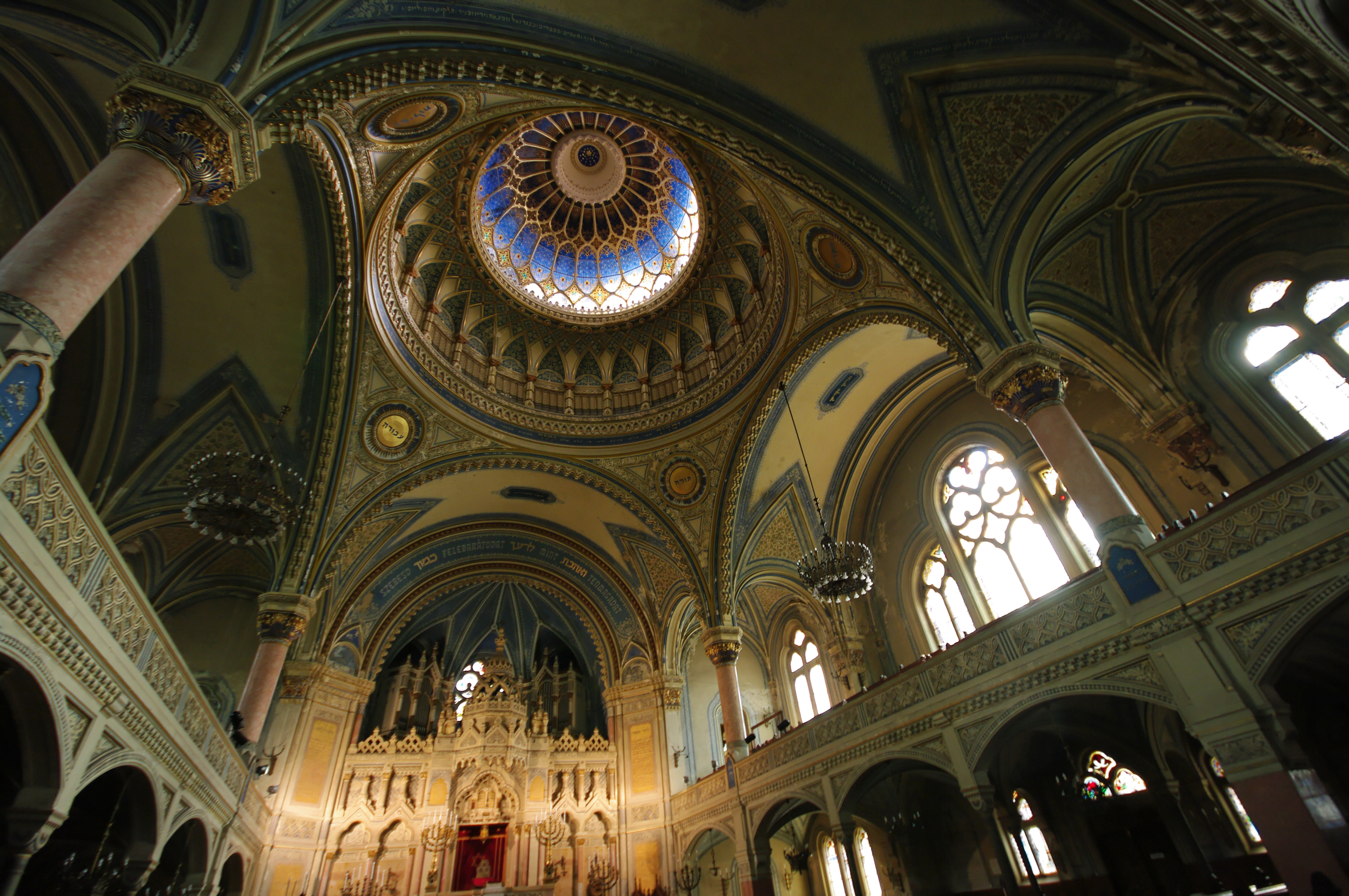
Interior of the Synagogue of Szeged, Hungary

- The Dohány Street Synagogue in Budapest, Hungary
- The Synagogue of Szeged

==== Italy ====
- The Great Synagogue of Florence
- The Great Synagogue of Rome
- The Synagogue of Trieste

==== Netherlands ====
- The Portuguese Synagogue of Amsterdam

==== Poland ====
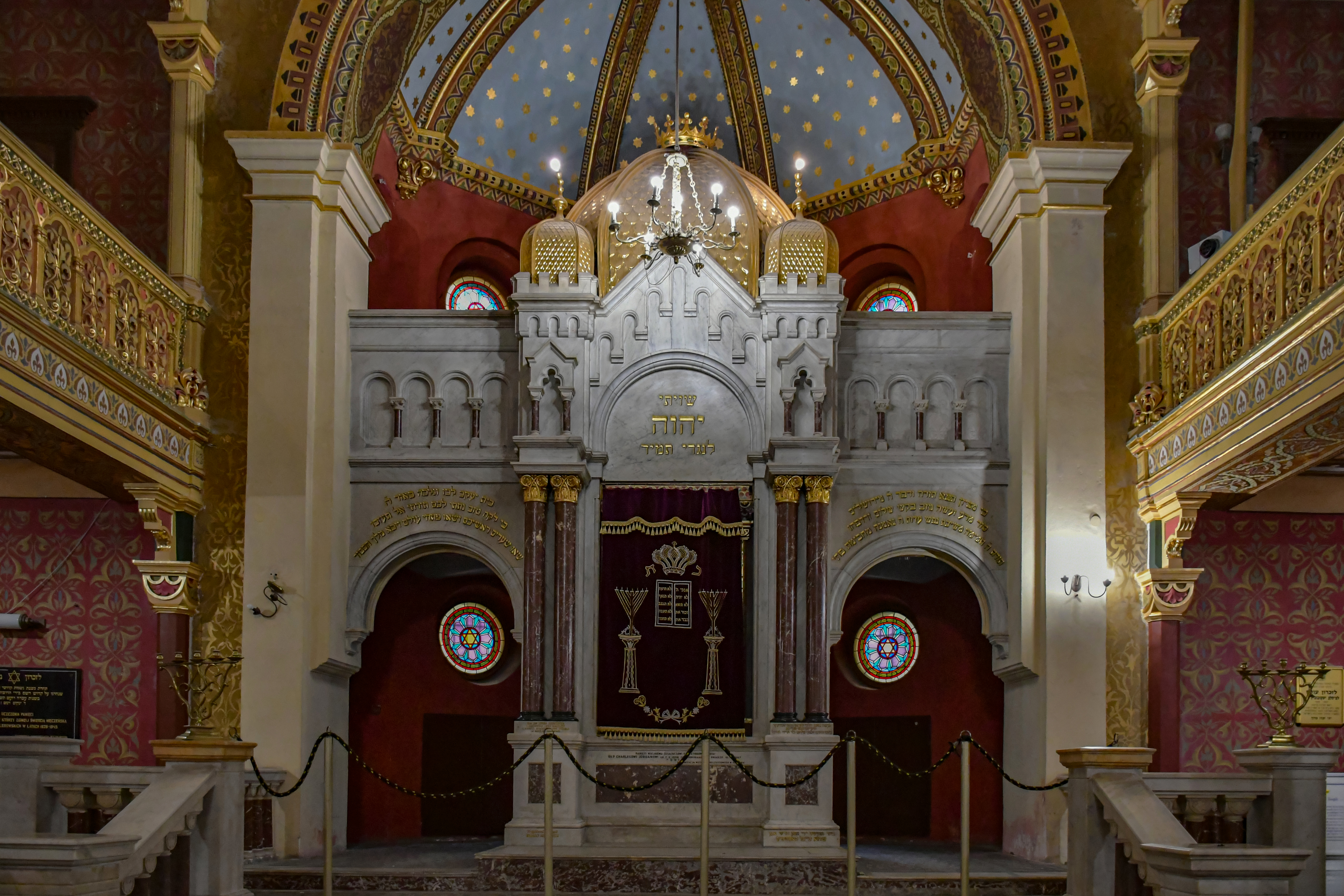
The Torah ark of the Progressive Synagogue of Kraków.

- The Great Synagogues of Warsaw and Łódź, destroyed by Nazis during World War II.
- The Progressive Synagogue of Kraków.
- The Great Synagogue of Włodawa

==== Romania ====
- The Choral Temple of Bucharest
- The Great Synagogue of Iași
- The Cetate Synagogue of Timișoara

==== Russia ====
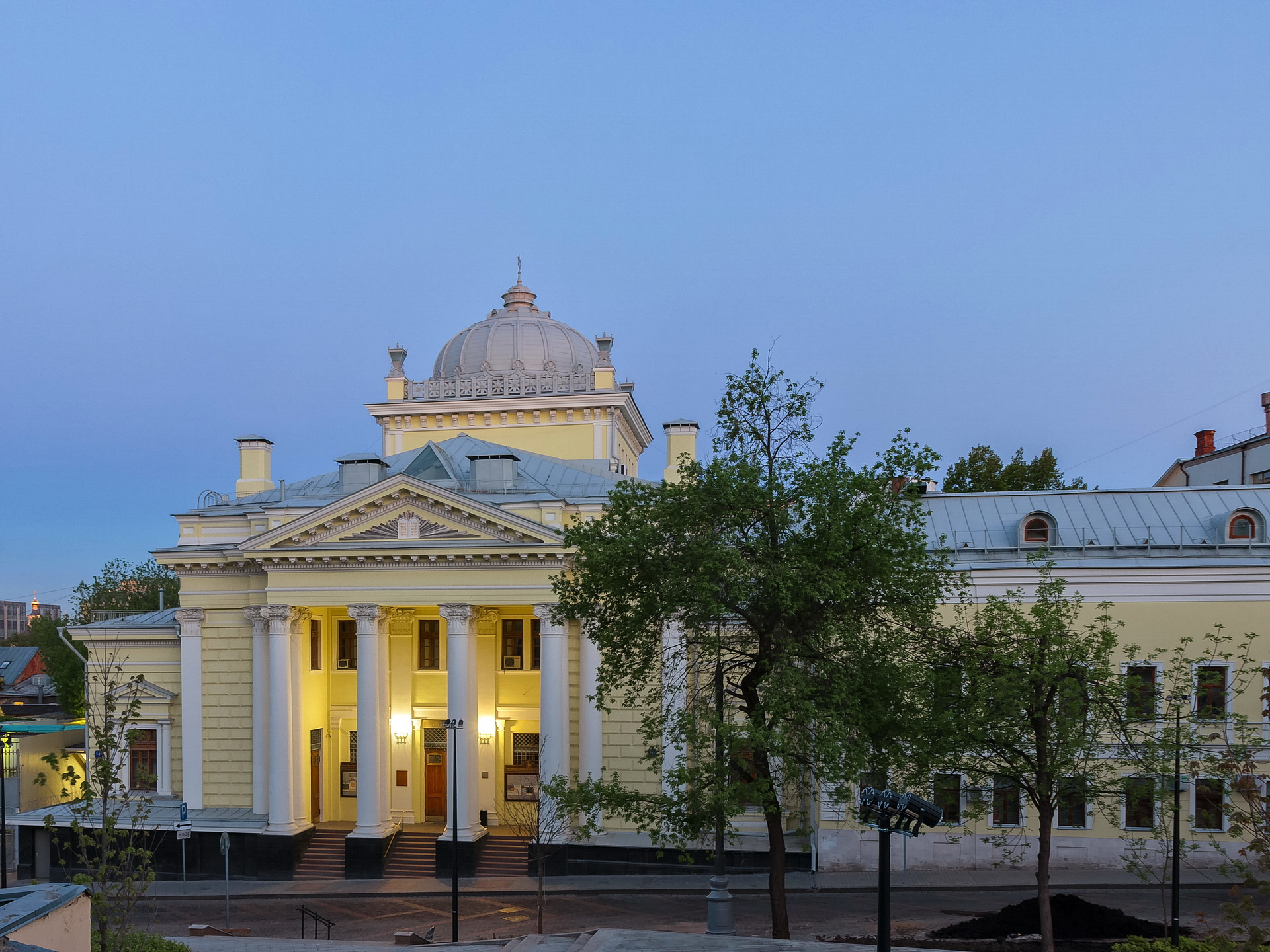
The Moscow Choral Synagogue in Russia.

- The Moscow Choral Synagogue
- The Grand Choral Synagogue of St. Petersburg
- The Soldier Synagogue of Rostov-on-Don

==== Scandinavia ====
- The Great Synagogue (Copenhagen), Denmark
- The Great Synagogue of Stockholm

==== Serbia ====
- The Synagogue of Novi Sad
- The Synagogue of Subotica

==== Ukraine ====
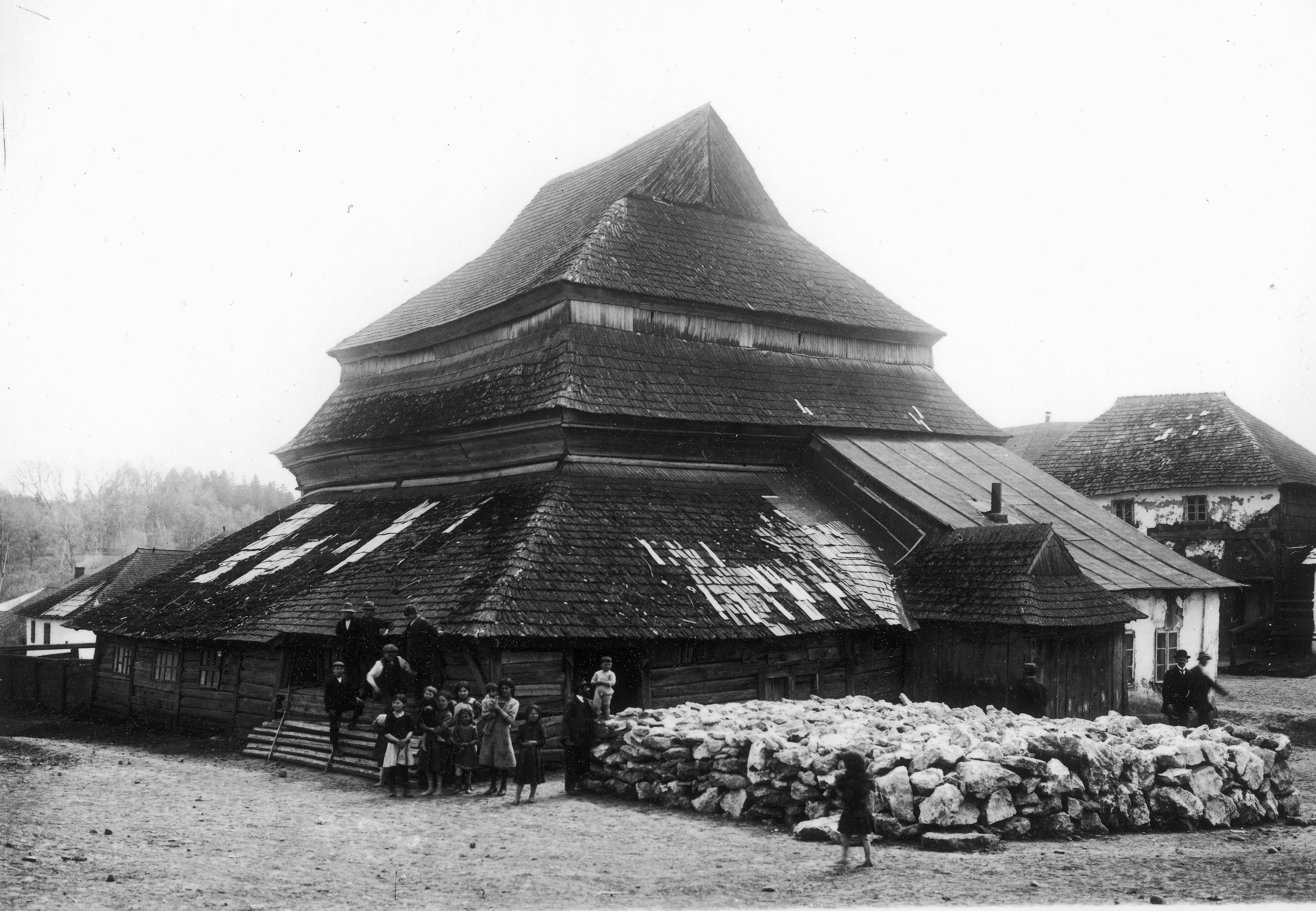
The Gwoździec Synagogue, one of the famous Polish-Lithuanian wooden synagogue.

- The Kharkiv Choral Synagogue
- The Great Choral Synagogue, Kyiv
- The Gwoździec Synagogue, was located in the former Polish–Lithuanian Commonwealth in what is now Hvizdets in Ukraine. Built in the mid-17th century, the synagogue destroyed by the Nazis in 1941.

==== United Kingdom ====
- The Great Synagogue of London, destroyed by aerial bombing in the London Blitz in 1941

=== Australia ===
- The Great Synagogue of Sydney

== World's largest synagogues ==
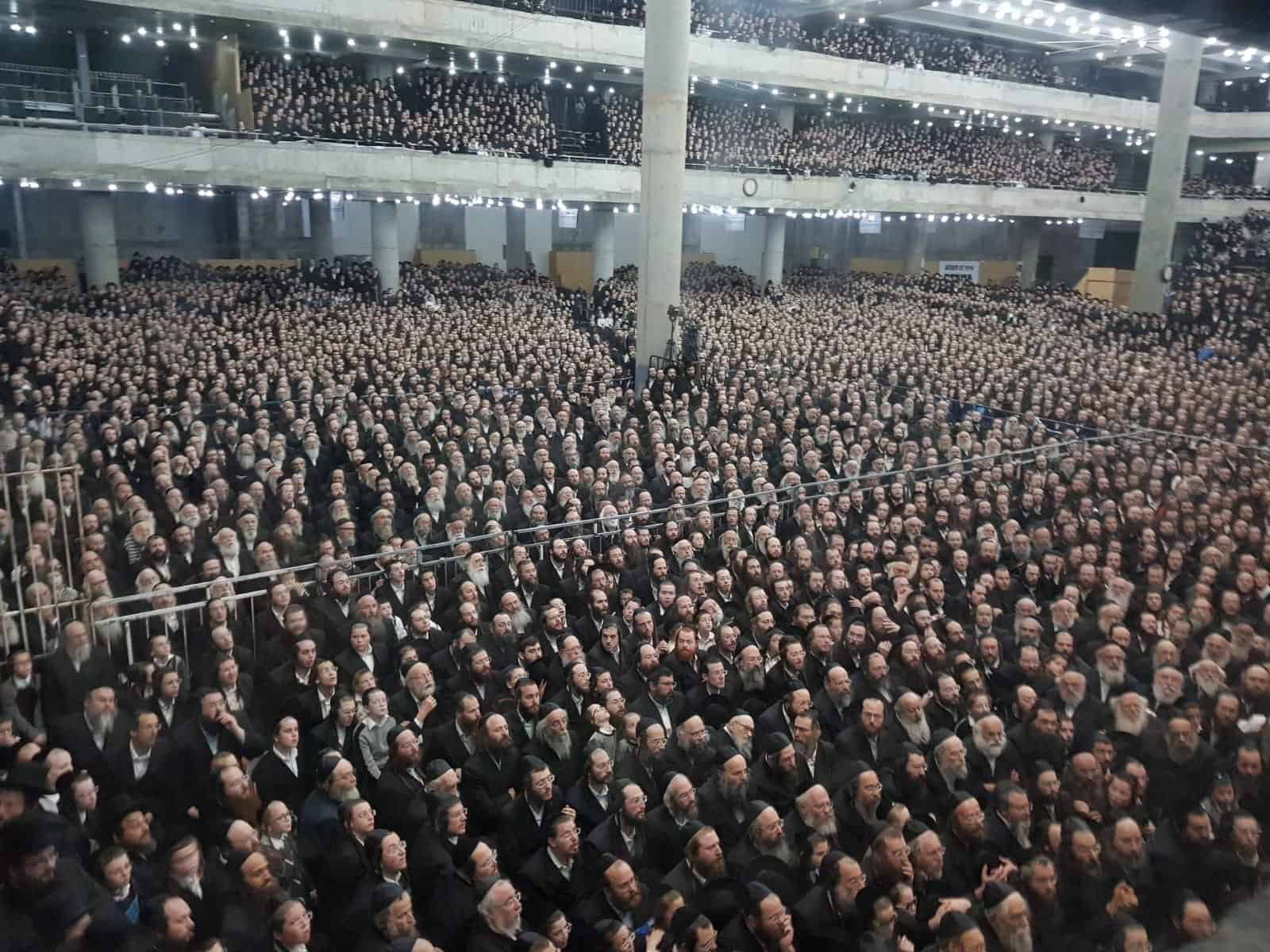
Congregants inside the Great Beth Midrash Gur (Jerusalem)

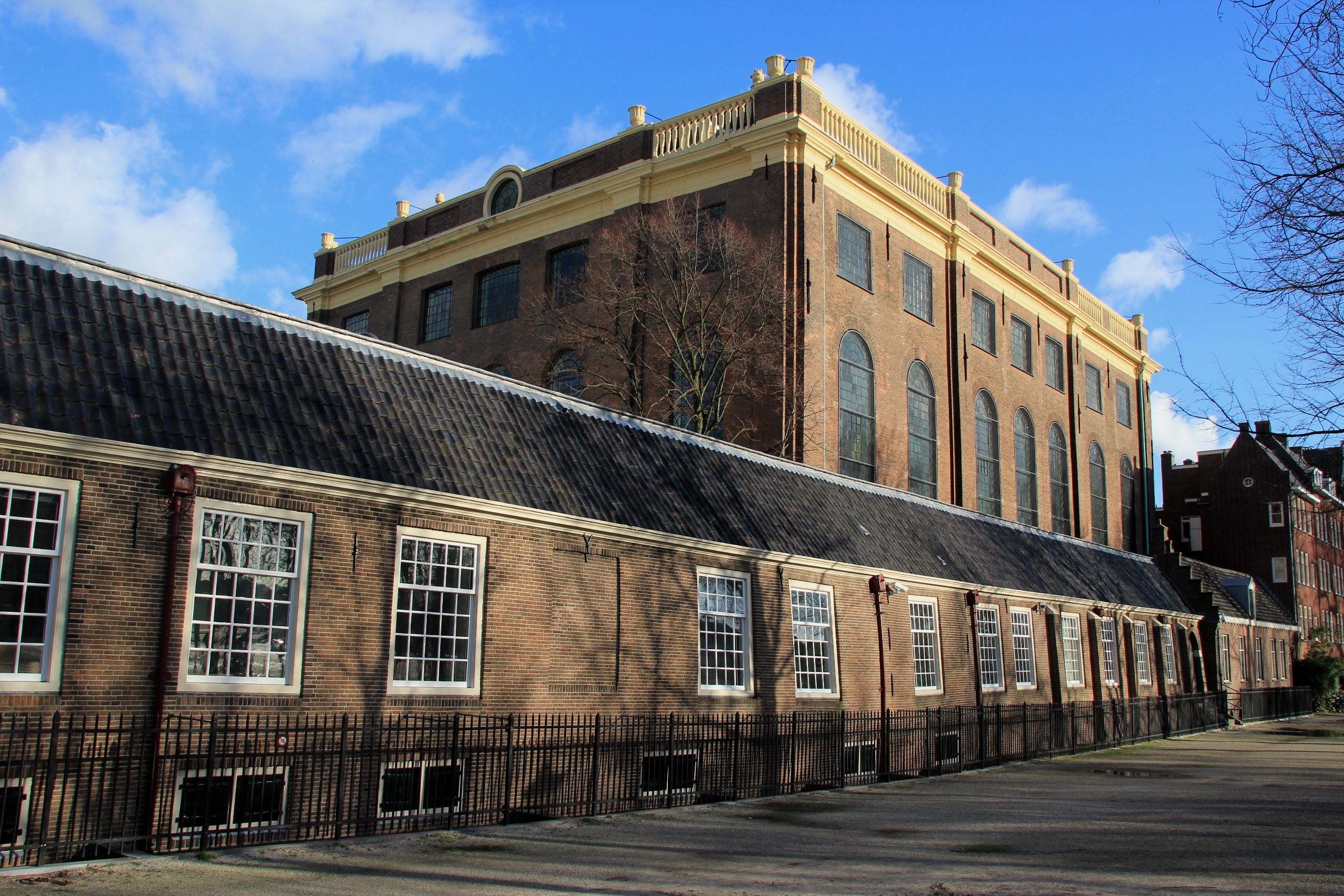
Portuguese Synagogue (Amsterdam)

=== Israel ===
- The largest synagogue in the world is the Great Beth Midrash Gur, in Jerusalem, Israel, whose main sanctuary seats up to 20,000, and has an area of approximately 7,500 m^{2} (81,000 sq ft), while the entire complex has an area of approximately 35,000 m^{2} (380,000 sq ft). Construction on the edifice took more than 25 years.
- Kehilat Kol HaNeshama, a Reform synagogue located in Baka, Jerusalem, is the largest Reform (and largest non-Orthodox) Jewish synagogue in Israel.

=== Europe ===
- The Dohány Street Synagogue in Budapest, Hungary, is the largest synagogue in Europe by square footage and number of seats. It seats 3,000, and has an area of 1,200 m^{2} (13,000 sq ft) and height of 26 m (85 ft) (apart from the towers, which are 43 m or 141 ft).
- The Synagogue of Trieste is the largest synagogue in Western Europe.
- The Great Synagogue of Rome is one of the largest synagogues in Europe.
- The Portuguese Synagogue in Amsterdam, also called "Esnoga", was built in 1675. At that time it was the largest synagogue in the world. Apart from the buildings surrounding the synagogue, it has an area of 1,008 m^{2} (10,850 sq ft), is 19.5 meters (64 ft) high. It was built to accommodate 1,227 men and 440 women.
- Szeged Synagogue is located in Szeged, Hungary, seats 1,340 and has height of 48.5 m (159 ft).
- The Sofia Synagogue is located in Sofia, Bulgaria, seating about 1,200.
- The Subotica Synagogue is located in Subotica, Serbia, seating more than 900.
- Great Synagogue (Plzeň) in the Czech Republic is the second-largest synagogue in Europe, and the third-largest in the world.

=== North America ===
- Baron Hirsch Synagogue, an Orthodox synagogue in Memphis, Tennessee, was the largest in the United States at the time of its dedication in 1957, seating 2,200 worshippers with an additional accommodation for 1,000 in its main sanctuary. The synagogue moved in 1988, but the building remains in use as a church.
- The Satmar synagogue in Kiryas Joel, New York, which is said to seat "several thousand", is also very large.
- Congregation Yetev Lev D'Satmar (Rodney Street, Brooklyn) is also said to seat "several thousand".
- Temple Emanu-El of New York, a Reform Temple, is located in New York City, with an area of 3,523 m^{2} (37,920 sq ft), seating 2,500. It is the largest Reform synagogue in the world.
- Congregation Yetev Lev D'Satmar (Hooper Street, Brooklyn) seats between 2,000 and 4,000 congregants.
- The main sanctuary of Adas Israel Congregation (Washington, D.C.) seats 1,500.
- Temple Emanu-El (Miami Beach, Florida) located in Miami Beach, Florida, seats approximately 1,400 people.
- Congregation Shaare Zion, an Orthodox Sephardic synagogue located in Brooklyn, New York, is the largest Syrian Jewish congregation in New York City. It is attended by over 1,000 worshipers on weekends.
- Beth Tzedec Congregation in Toronto, Ontario, is the largest Conservative synagogue in North America.
- Temple Israel, a Reform synagogue in Memphis, Tennessee, seats 1,335 to 1,500 people in its main sanctuary. The massive synagogue complex contains over 11,600 m^{2} (125,000 sq ft) on 12 hectares (30 acres).

== World's oldest synagogues ==
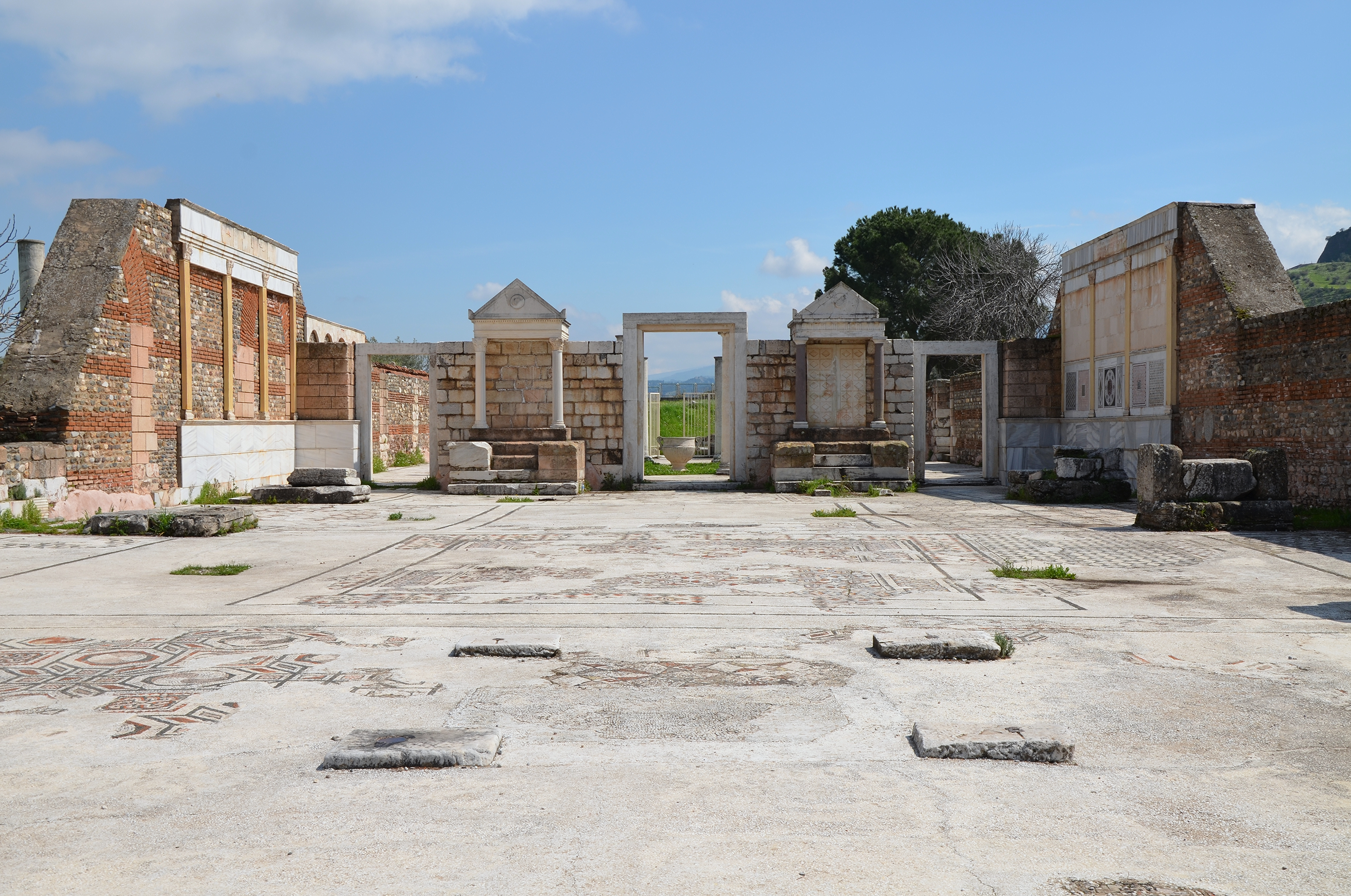
Sardis Synagogue (3rd century CE) Sardis, Turkey

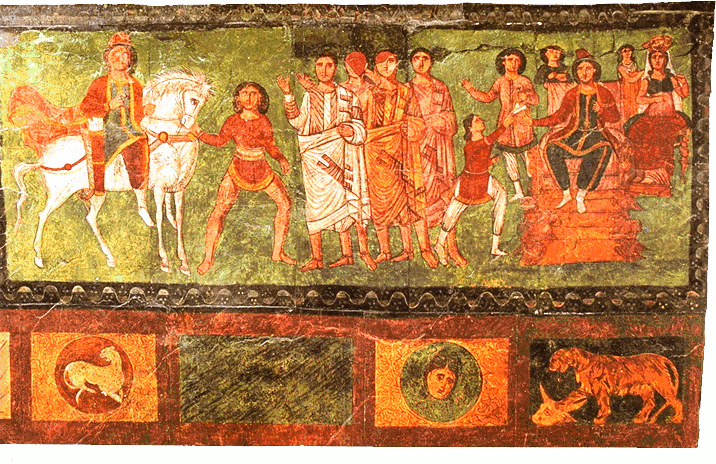
Fresco at the Dura-Europos synagogue, illustrating a scene from the Book of Esther, 244 CE.

- The earliest evidence for a synagogue is a stone-carved synagogue dedication inscription found in Lower Egypt and dating from the second half of the 3rd century BCE.
- The oldest Samaritan synagogue, the Delos Synagogue, dates from between 150 and 128 BCE, or earlier and is located on the island of Delos.
- The synagogue of Dura Europos, a Seleucid city in north eastern Syria, dates from the third century CE. It is unique. The walls were painted with figural scenes from the Tanakh. The paintings included Abraham and Isaac, Moses and Aaron, Solomon, Samuel and Jacob, Elijah and Ezekiel. The synagogue chamber, with its surviving paintings, is reconstructed in the National Museum in Damascus.
- The Old Synagogue in Erfurt, Germany, parts of which date to c.1100, is the oldest intact synagogue building in Europe. It is now used as a museum of local Jewish history.
- The Kochangadi Synagogue (1344 CE to 1789 CE) in Kochi in the Kerala, built by the Malabar Jews. It was destroyed by Tipu Sultan in 1789 CE and was never rebuilt. An inscription tablet from this synagogue is the oldest relic from any synagogue in India. Eight other synagogues exist in Kerala though not in active use anymore.

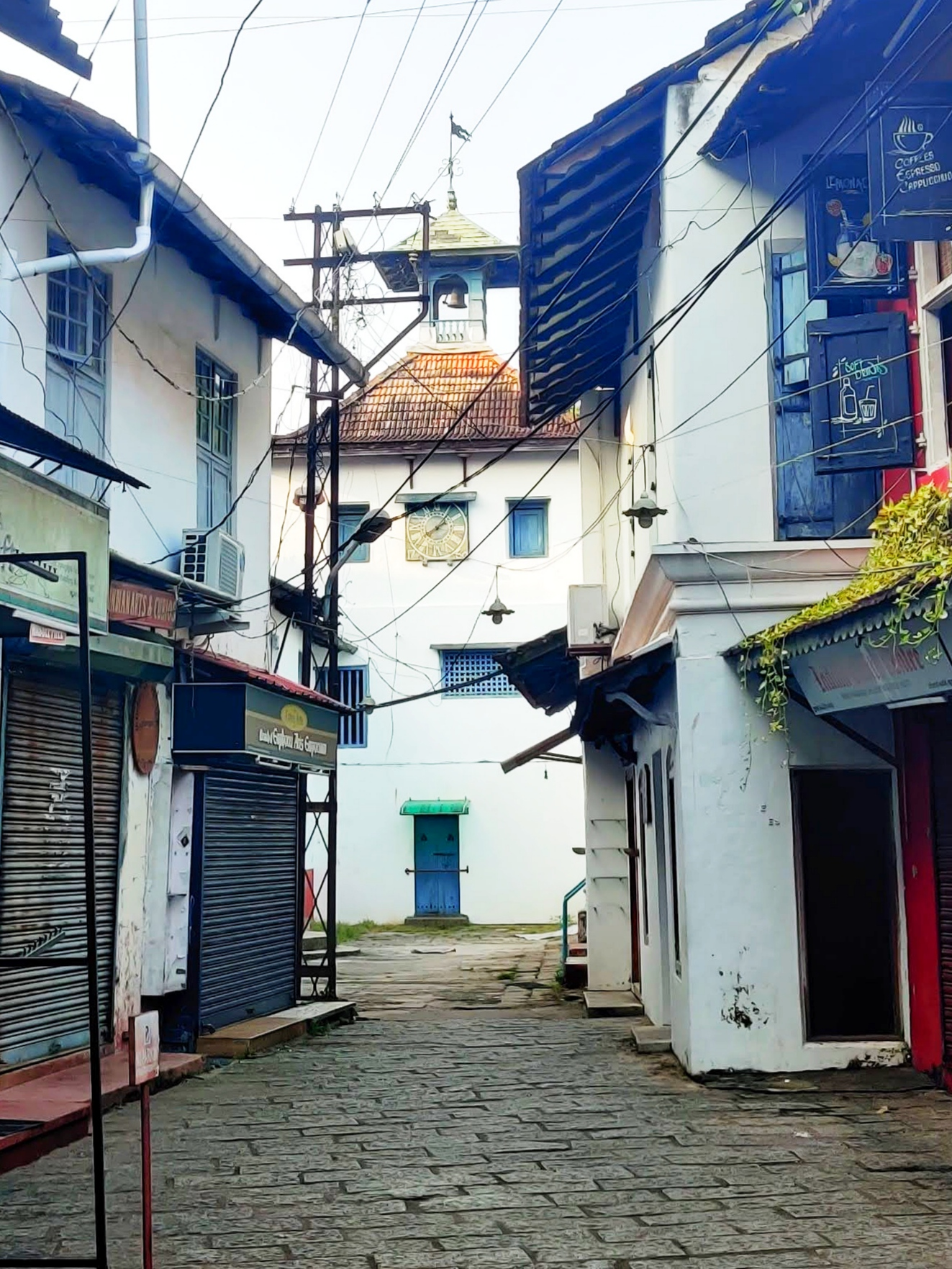
The Paradesi Synagogue in Jew Town, Kochi, during the COVID-19 pandemic.

- The Paradesi Synagogue is the oldest active synagogue in the Commonwealth of Nations, located in Kochi, Kerala, in India. It was built in 1568 by Paradesi community in the Kingdom of Cochin. Paradesi is a word used in several Indian languages, and the literal meaning of the term is "foreigners", applied to the synagogue because it was historically used by "White Jews", a mixture of Jews of the Middle East, and European exiles. It is also referred to as the Cochin Jewish Synagogue or the Mattancherry Synagogue. The synagogue is located in the quarter of Old Cochin known as Jew Town and is the only one of the eight synagogues in the area still in use.
- Jew's Court, Steep Hill, Lincoln, England, is arguably the oldest synagogue in Europe in current use.

=== Oldest synagogues in the United States ===
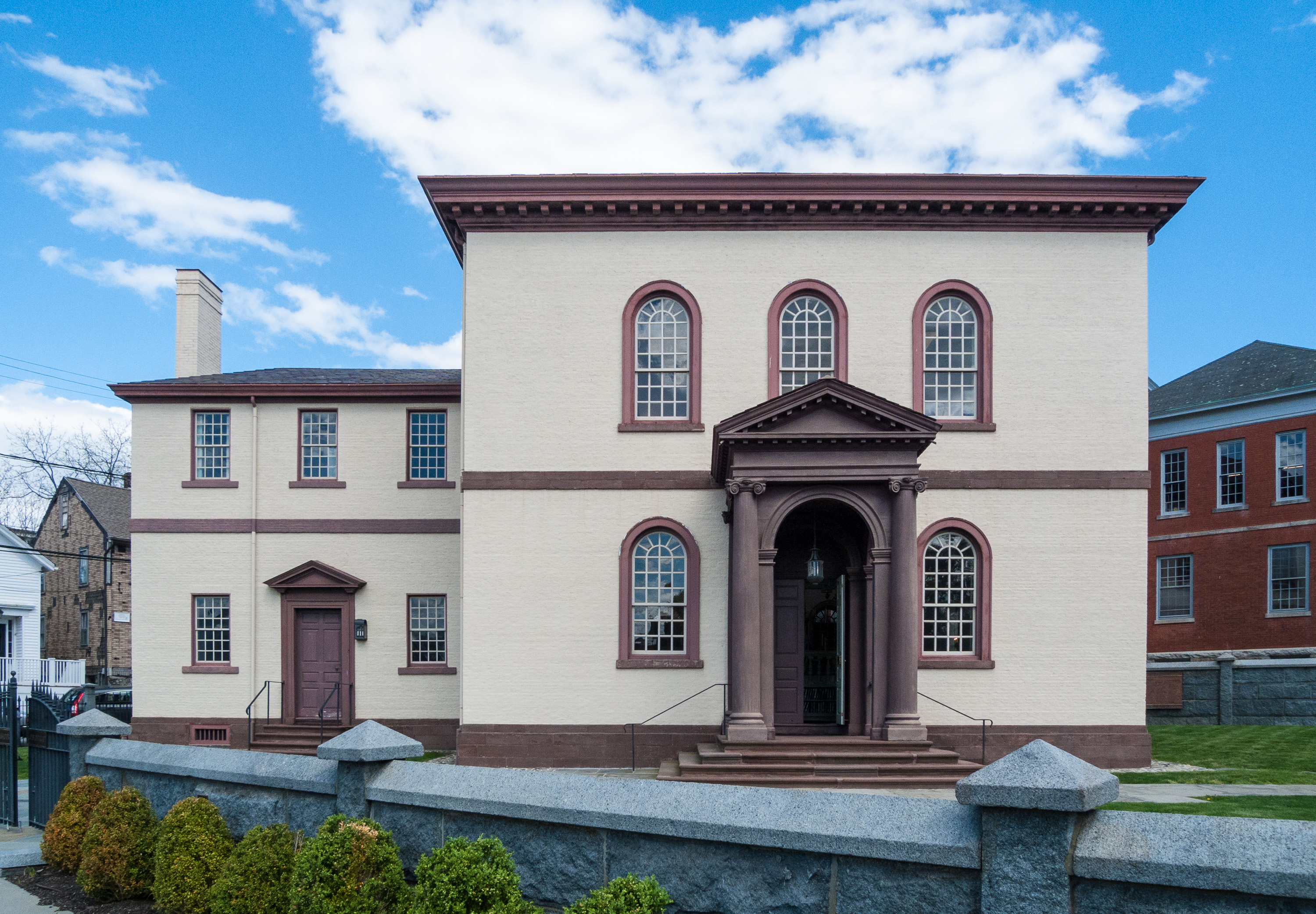
Touro Synagogue, the oldest surviving synagogue building in the U.S.

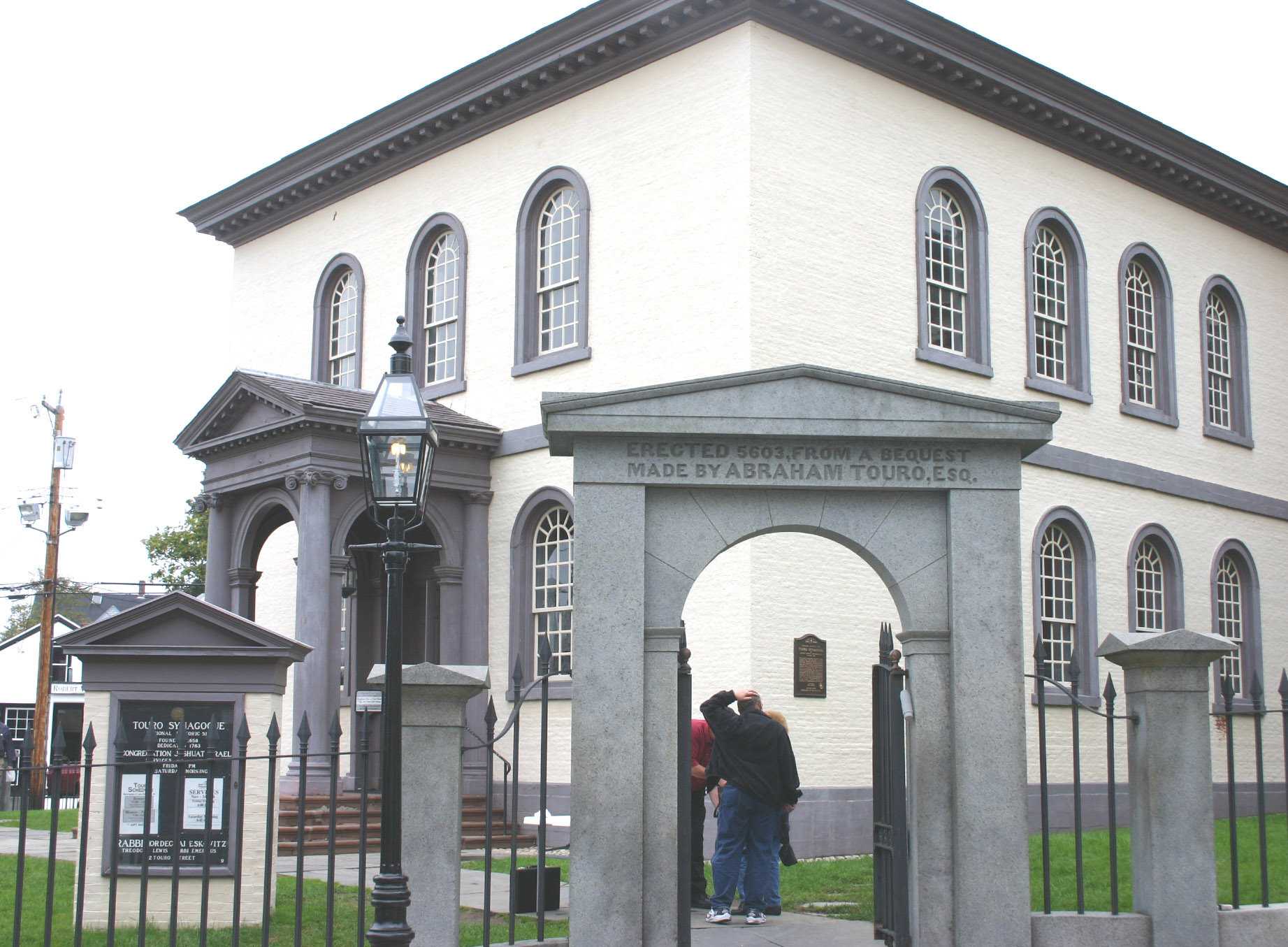
Touro Synagogue, the oldest surviving synagogue building in the U.S.

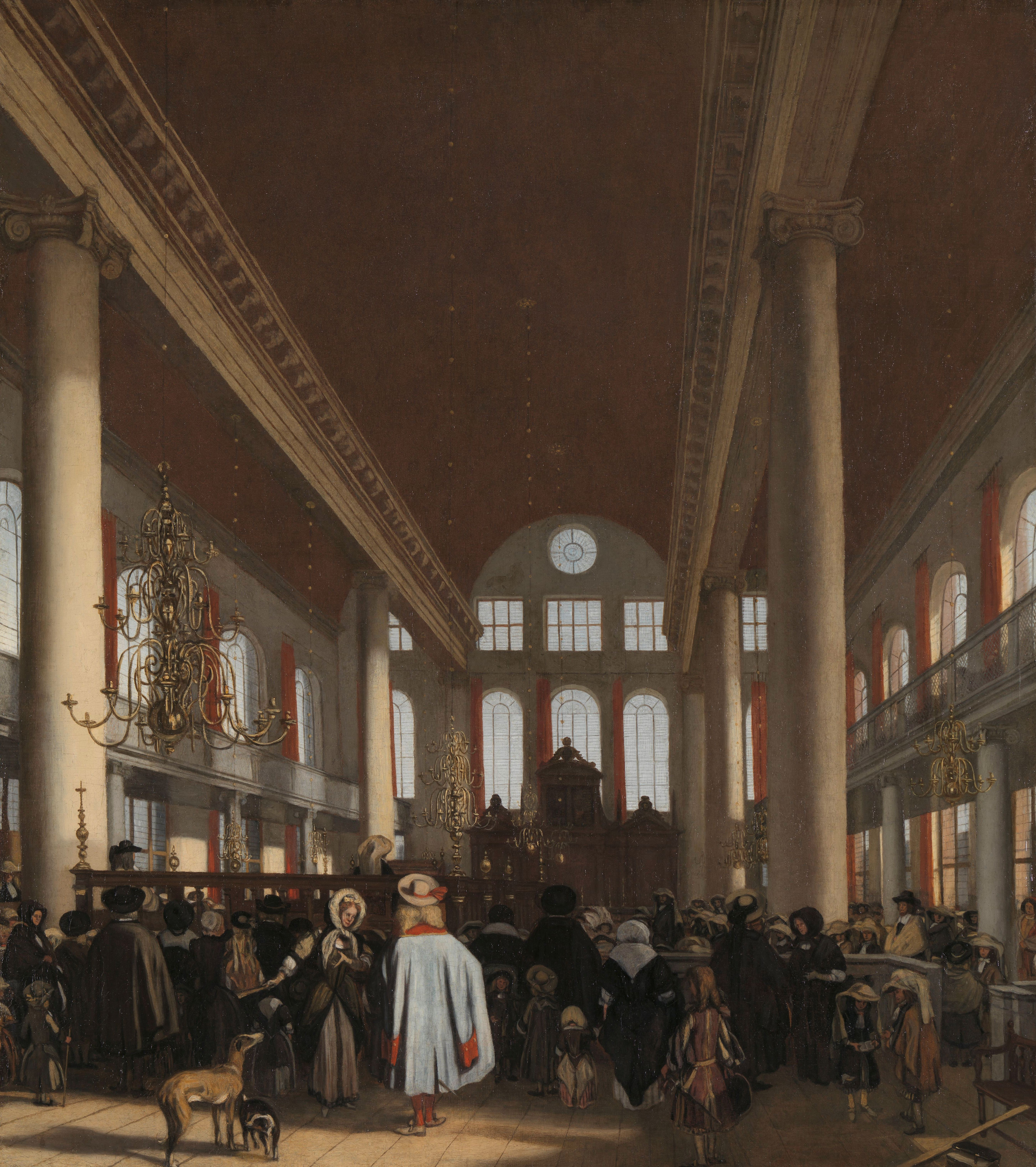
Painting of the interior of the Portuguese Synagogue (Amsterdam) by Emanuel de Witte (c. 1680)

- Congregation Shearith Israel, in New York City, founded in 1654, is the oldest congregation in the United States. Its present building dates from 1897.
- The Touro Synagogue in Newport, Rhode Island, is the oldest Jewish house of worship in North America that is still standing. It was built in 1759 for the Jeshuat Israel congregation, which was established in 1658.

== Other famous synagogues ==
- The Worms Synagogue in Germany, built in 1175 and razed on Kristallnacht in 1938, was painstakingly reconstructed using many of the original stones. It is still in use as a synagogue.
- The Synagogue of El Transito of Toledo, Spain, was built in 1356 by Samuel ha-Levi, treasurer of King Pedro I of Castile. This is one of the best examples of Mudéjar architecture in Spain. The design of the synagogue recalls the Nasrid style of architecture that was employed during the same period in the decorations of the palace of the Alhambra in Granada as well as the Mosque of Córdoba. Since 1964, this site has hosted a Sephardi museum.
- The Hurva Synagogue, located in the Jewish Quarter of the Old City of Jerusalem, was Jerusalem's main Ashkenazi synagogue from the 16th century until 1948, when it was destroyed by the Arab Legion several days after the conquest of the city. After the Six-Day War, an arch was built to mark the spot where the synagogue stood. A complete reconstruction, to plans drawn up by architect Nahum Meltzer, opened in March 2010.
- The Abdallah Ibn Salam Mosque or Oran, Algeria, built in 1880, but converted into a mosque in 1975 when most Algerian Jews had left the country for France following independence.
- The Nidhe Israel Synagogue ("Bridgetown Synagogue") of Barbados, located in the capital city of Bridgetown, was first built in 1654. It was destroyed in the hurricane of 1831 and reconstructed in 1833.
- The Curaçao synagogue or Snoa in Willemstad, Curaçao, Netherlands Antilles, was built by Sephardic Portuguese Jews from Amsterdam and Recife, Brazil. It is modeled after the Esnoga in Amsterdam. Congregation Mikvé Israel built this synagogue in 1692; it was reconstructed in 1732.
- The Bialystoker Synagogue on New York's Lower East Side, is located in a landmark building dating from 1826 that was originally a Methodist Episcopal Church. The building is made of quarry stone mined locally on Pitt Street, Manhattan. It is an example of federal architecture. The ceilings and walls are hand-painted with zodiac frescos, and the sanctuary is illuminated by 40-foot (12.19 m) stained-glass windows. The bimah and floor-to-ceiling ark are handcarved.
- The Great Synagogue of Florence, Tempio Maggiore, Florence, 1874–1882, is an example of the magnificent, cathedral-like synagogues built in almost every major European city in the 19th century and early 20th century.
- Boston's 1920 Vilna Shul is a rare surviving intact immigrant-era synagogue.
- The Northstar Synagogue in Arkhangelsk, Russia, is the world's northernmost synagogue building at 65.55 degrees north, second to the synagogue in Fairbanks, Alaska.
- The Görlitz Synagogue in Görlitz, Germany, was built in Jugendstil style between 1909 and 1911. Damaged, but not destroyed, during the Kristallnacht riots, the synagogue was bought by the City Council in 1963. After extensive renovations concluding in late 2020, the main sanctuary (Kuppelsaal with 310 seats) was to be reopened for general culture, and the small synagogue (Wochentags-Synagoge, with space for around 45 visitors)

== Gallery ==
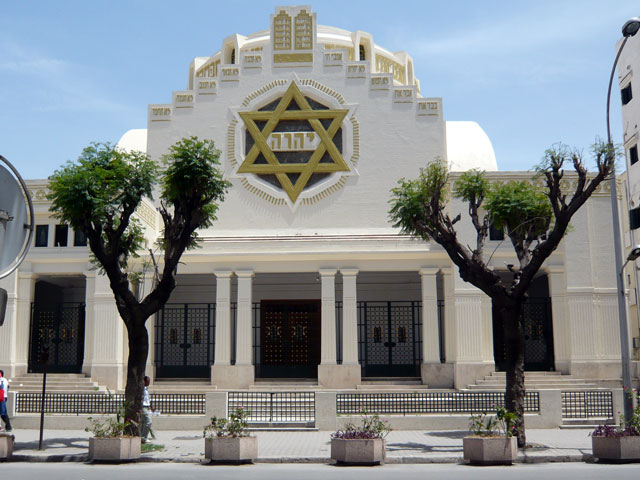
The Great Synagogue of Tunis, Tunisia

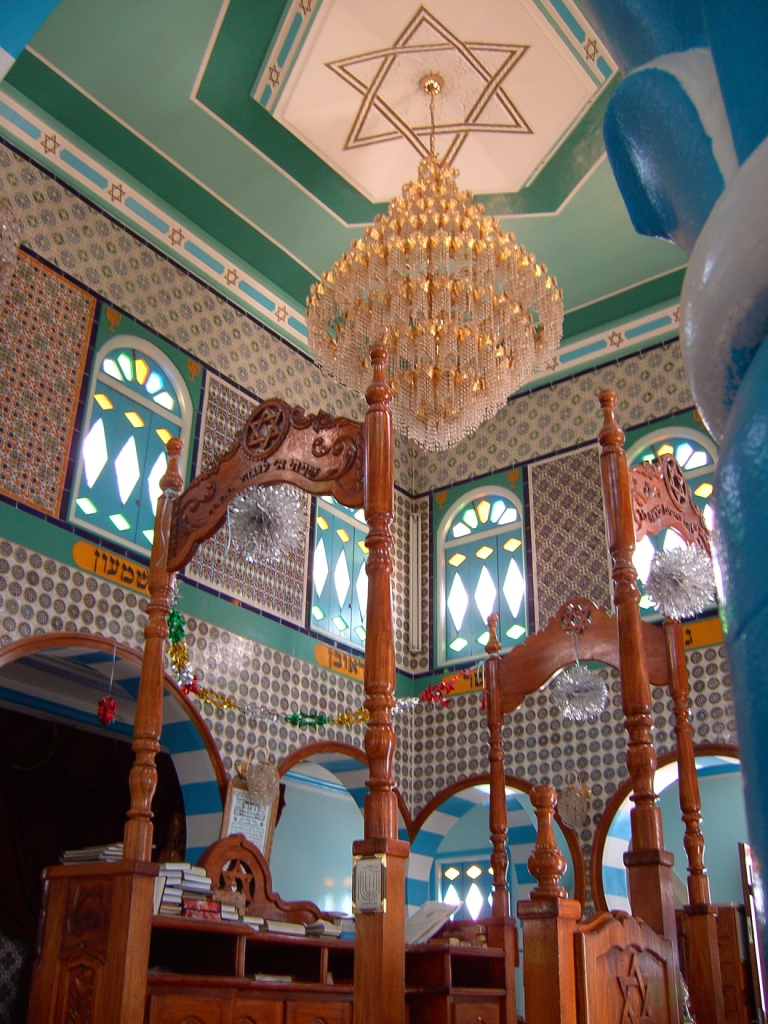
The Zarzis Synagogue, Tunisia

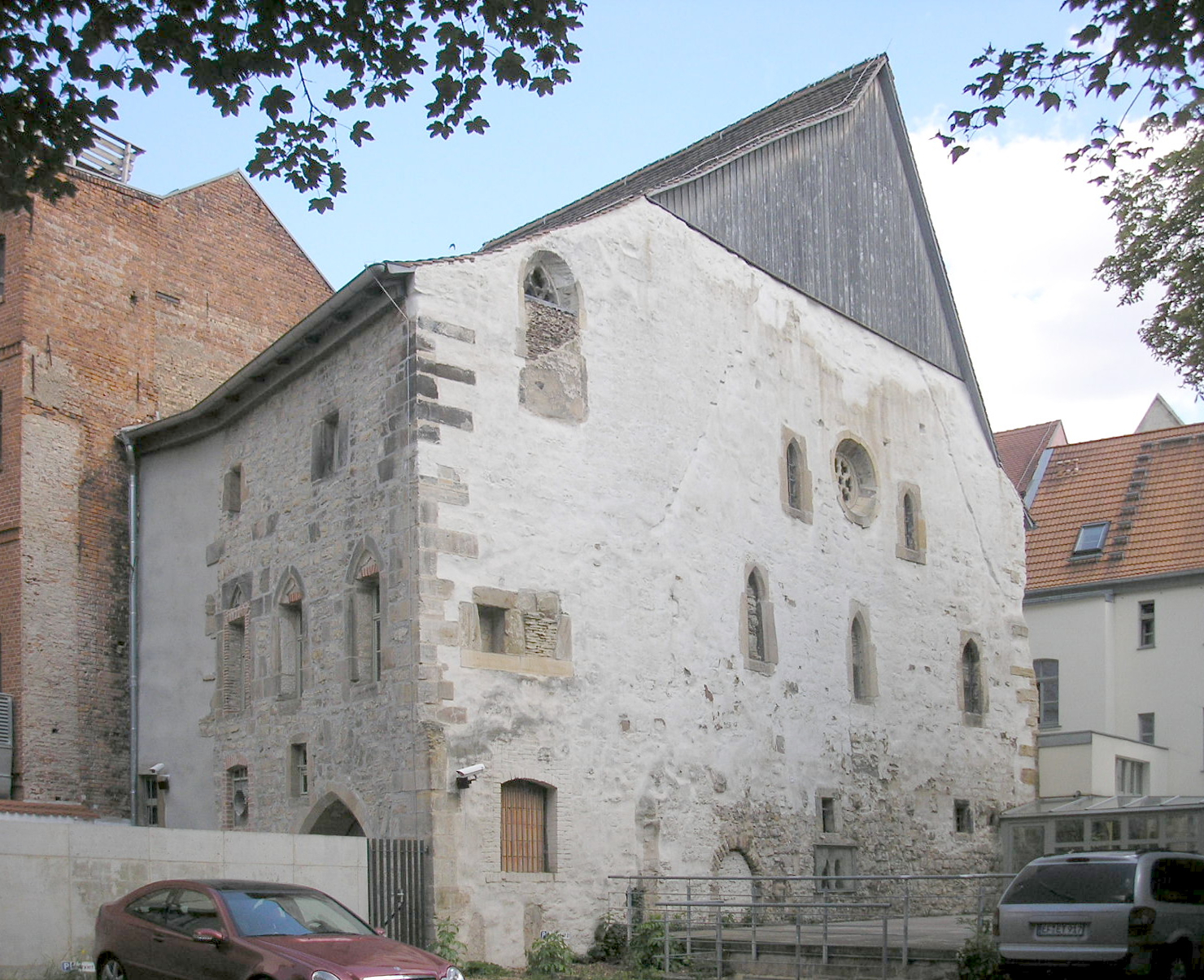
The Old Synagogue (Erfurt) is the oldest intact synagogue building in Europe.

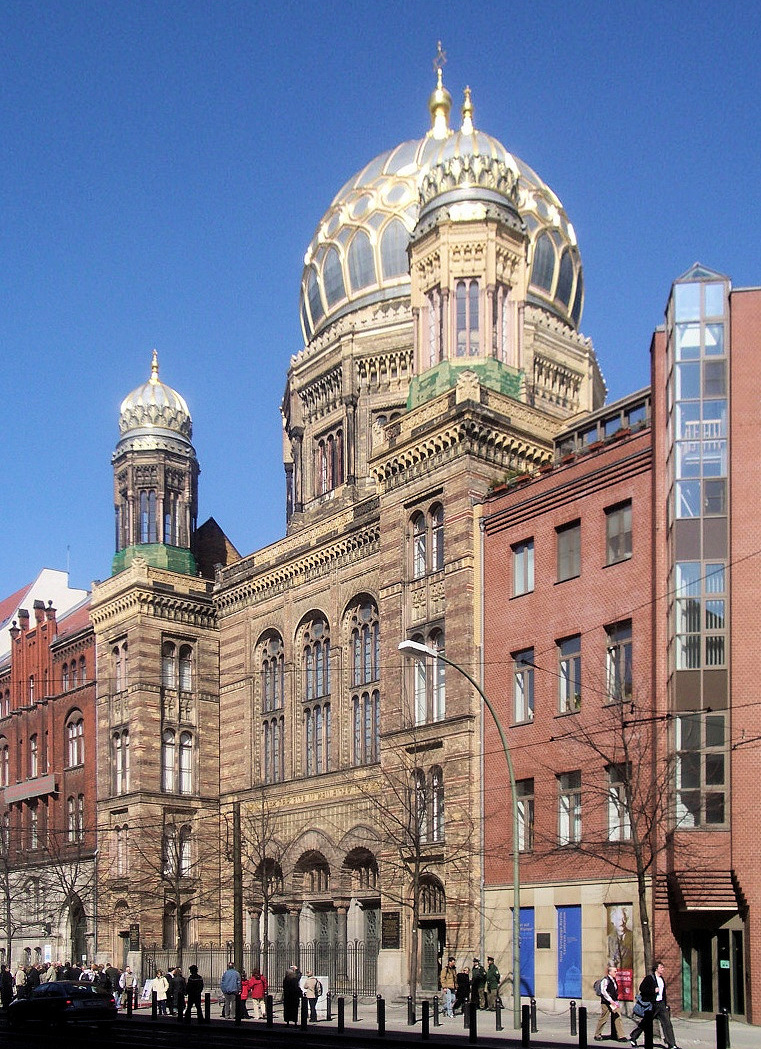
The New Synagogue in Berlin, Germany

The main synagogue of the city of Frankfurt am Main (Germany) before the Kristallnacht

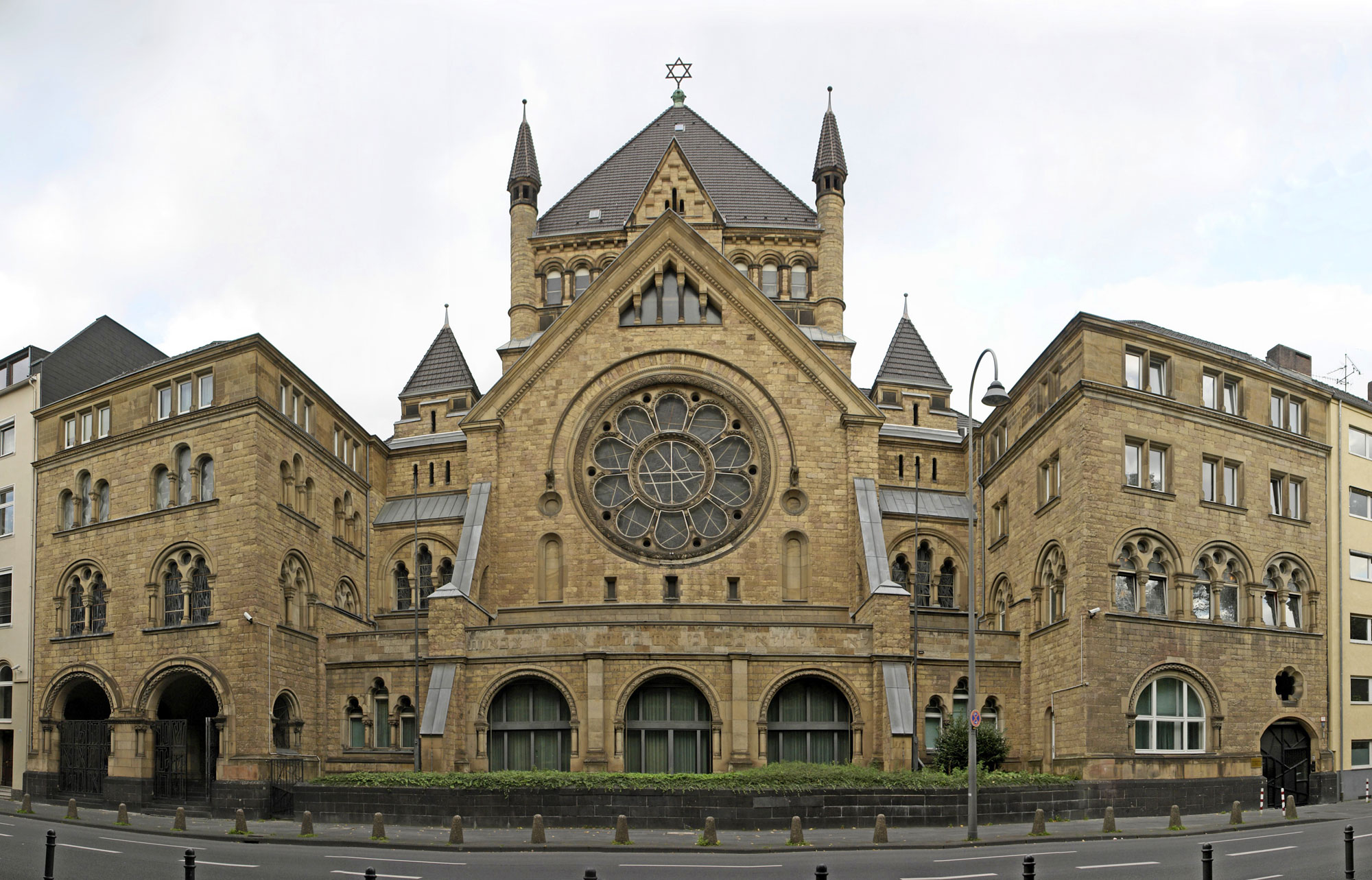
The Roonstrasse Synagogue in Cologne, Germany

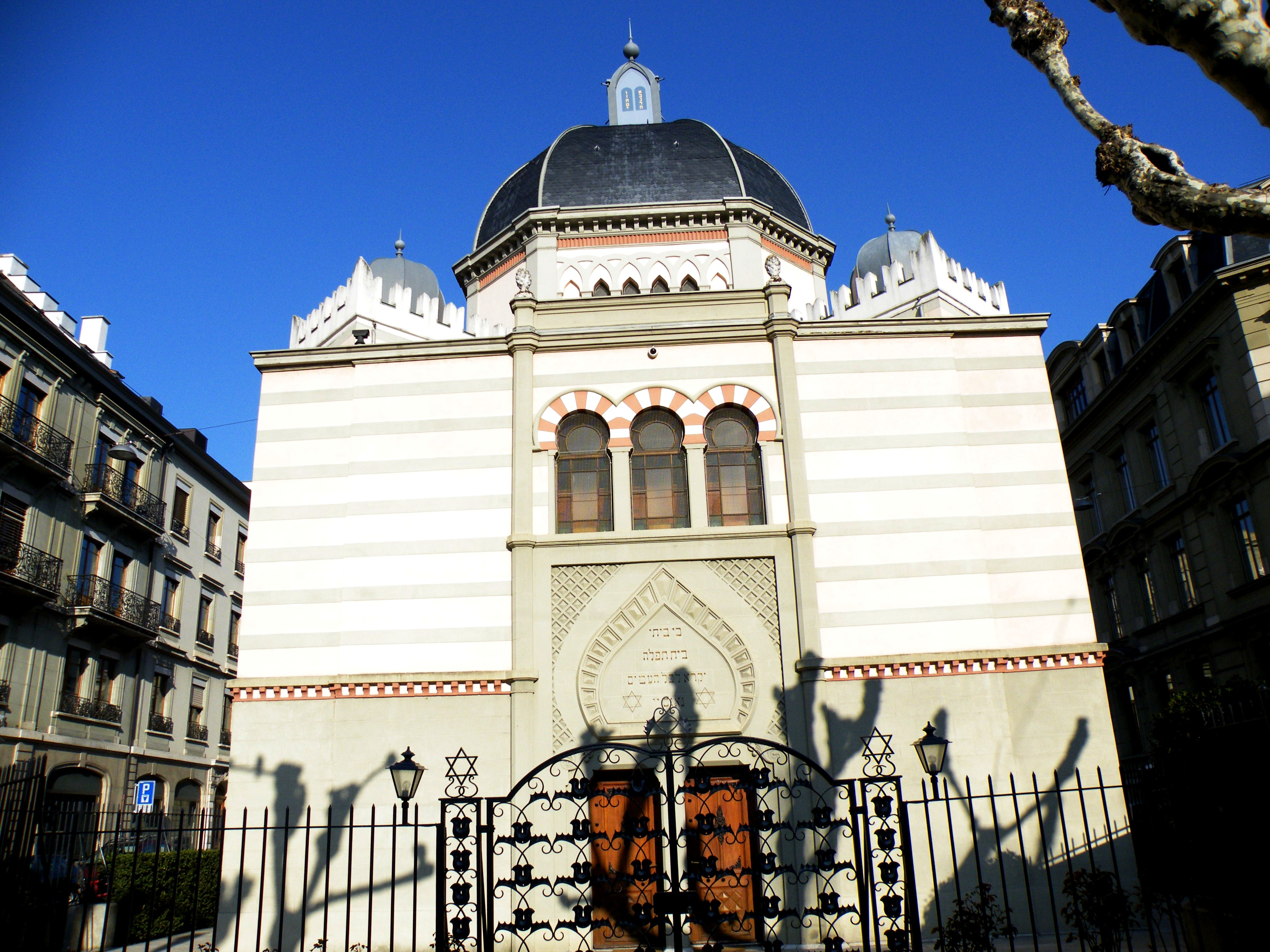
Beth Yaakov Synagogue, Switzerland

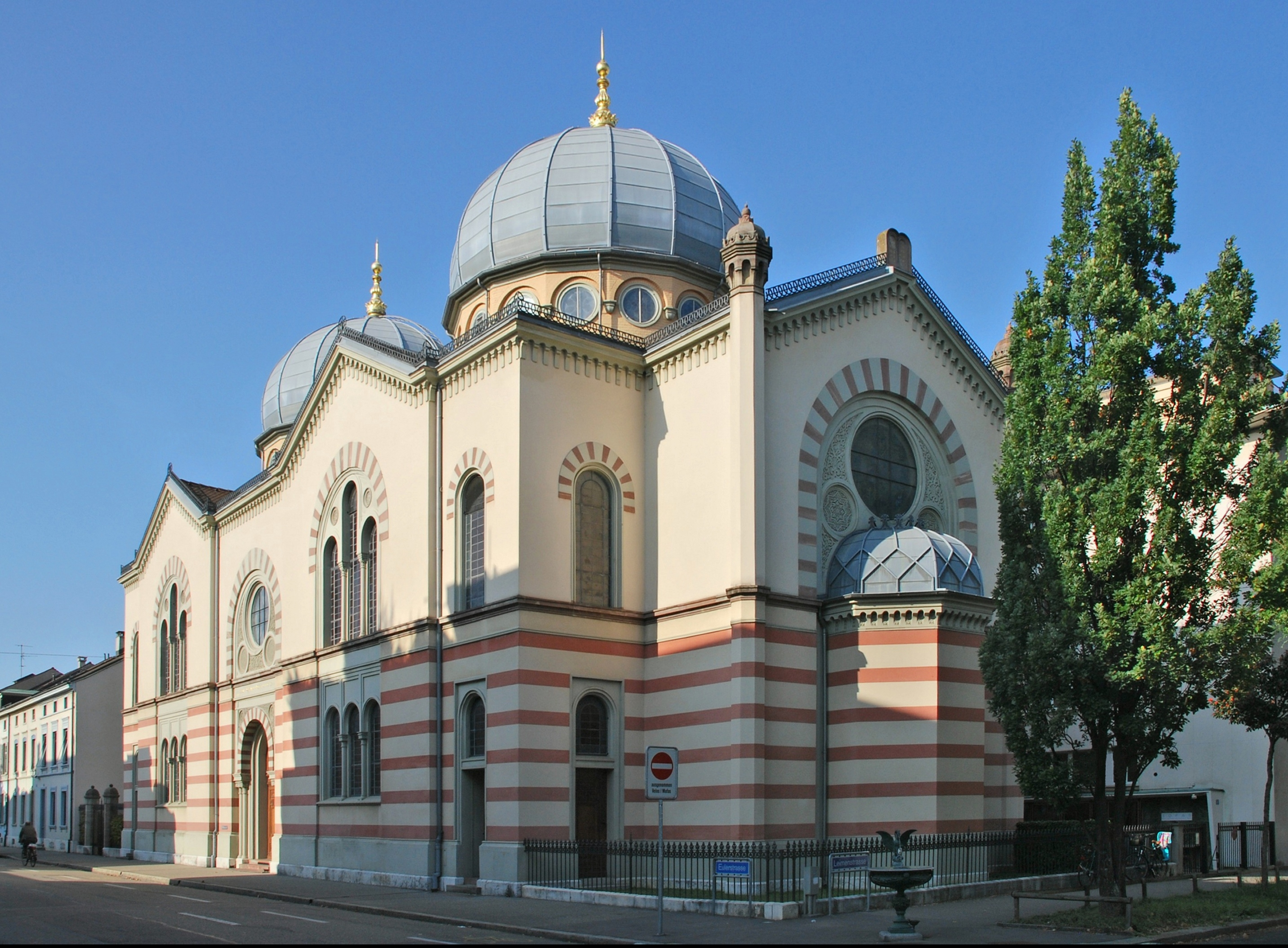
The Great Synagogue of Basel in Basel, Switzerland

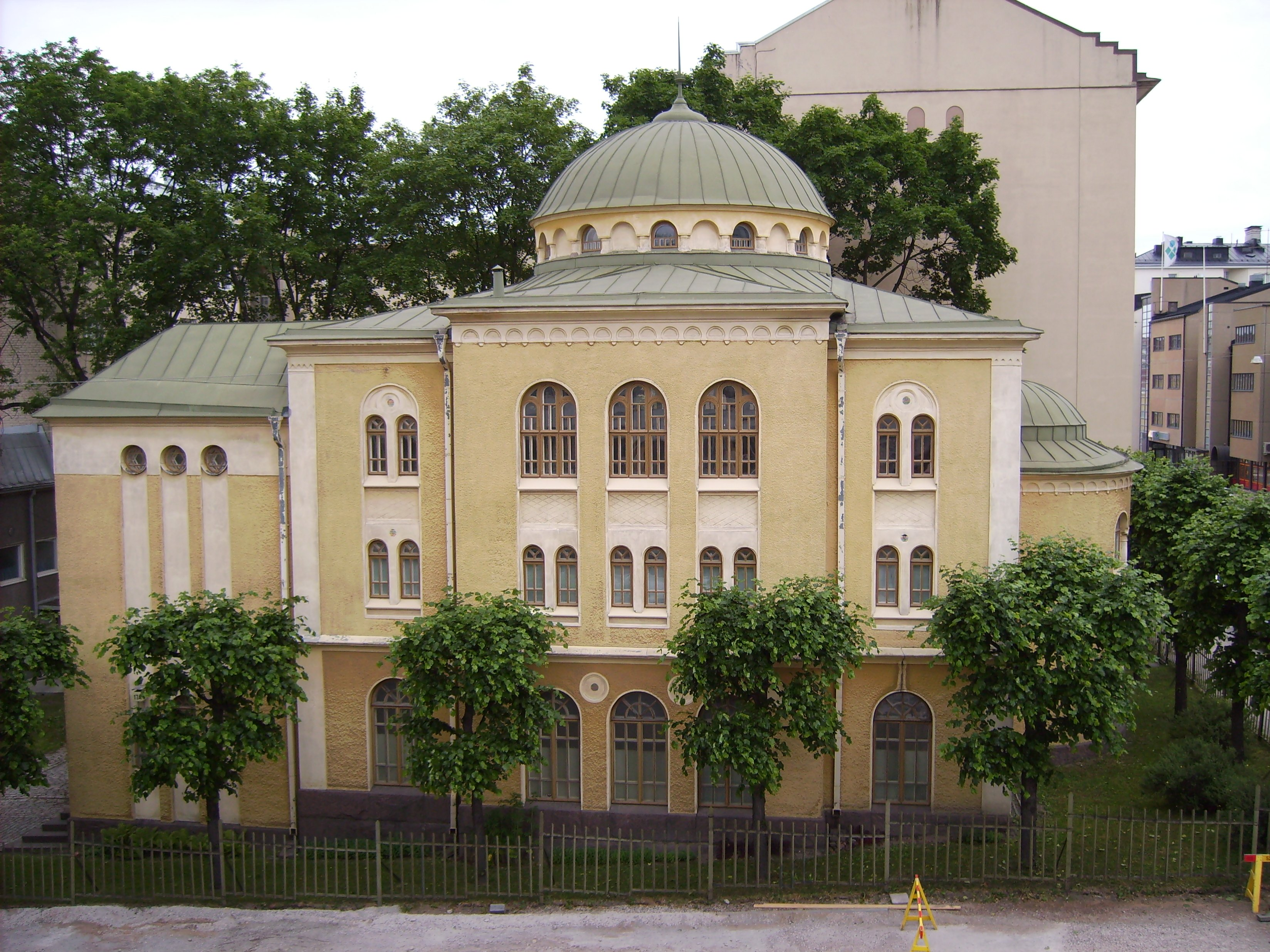
The Turku Synagogue in Turku, Finland

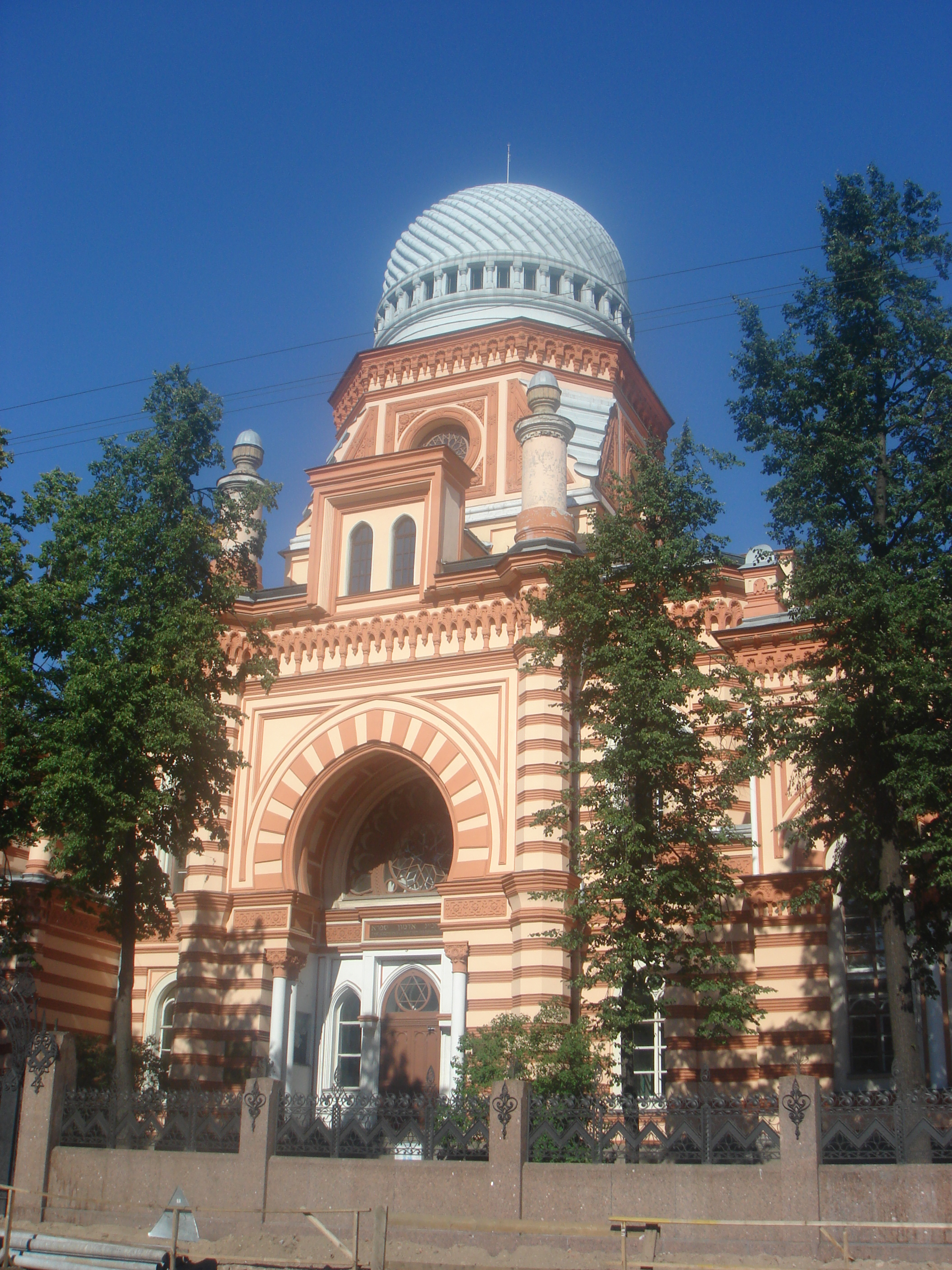
The Grand Choral Synagogue of Saint Petersburg, Russia

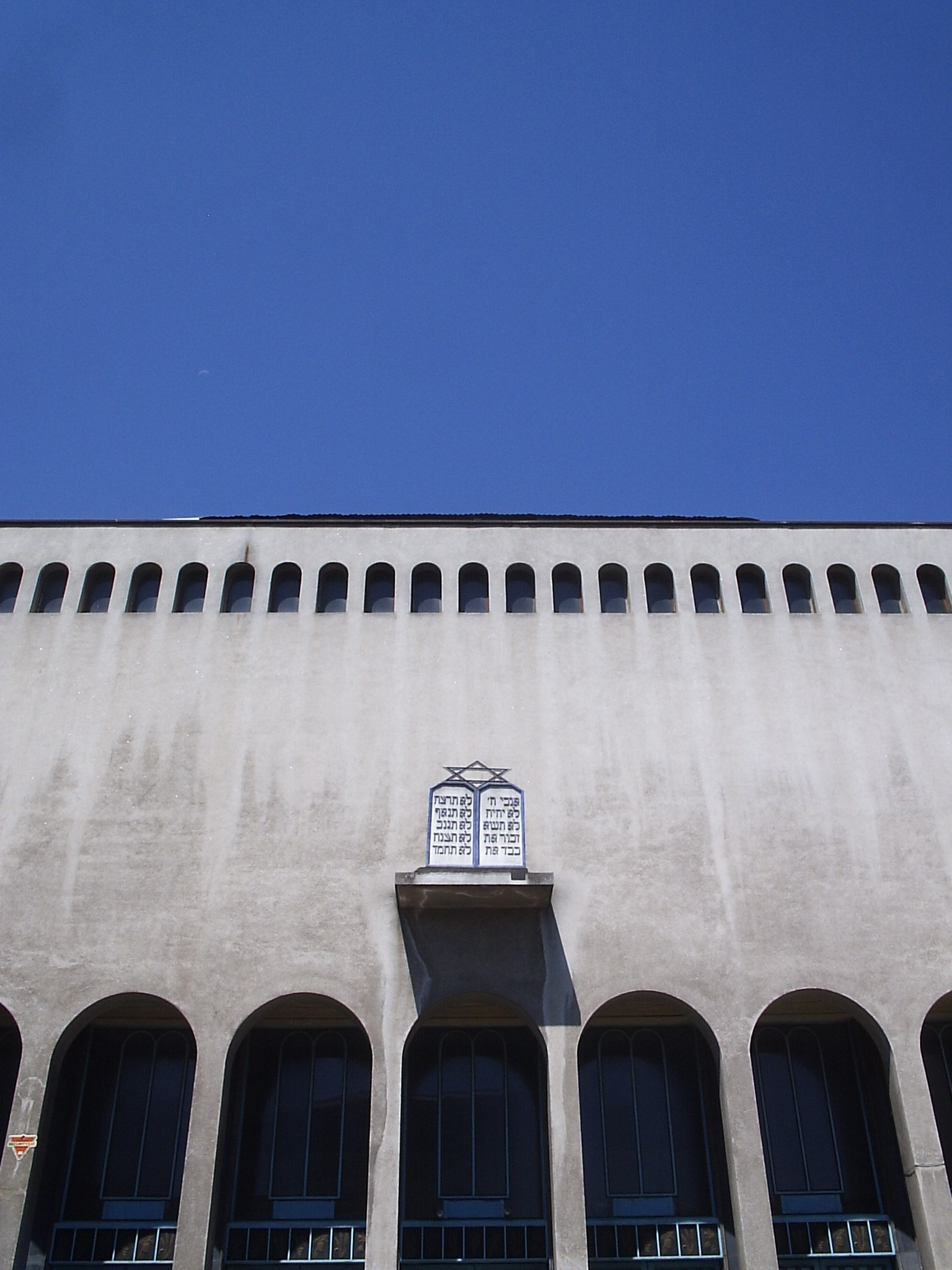
The Great Synagogue of Santiago, Chile

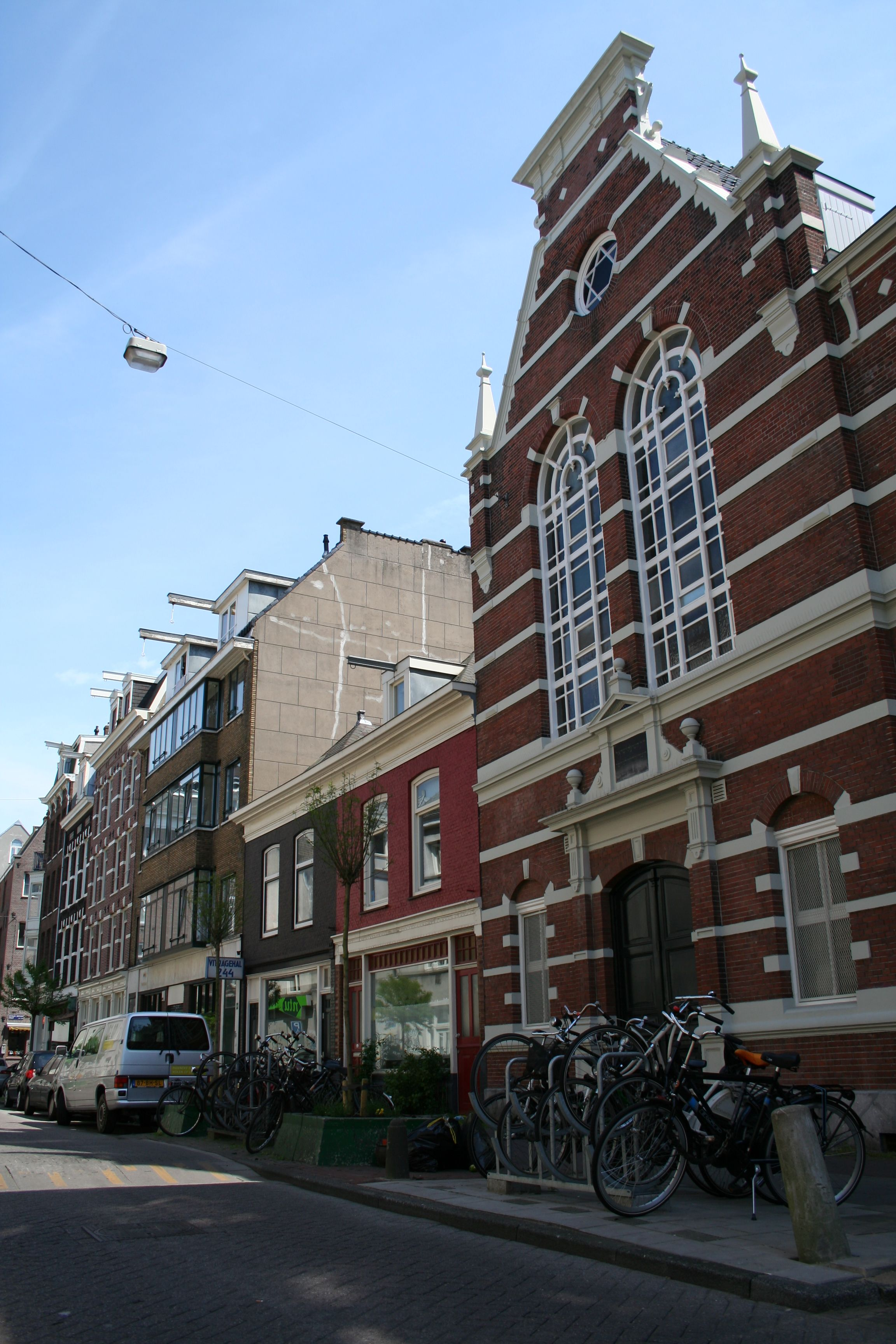
The Synagogue in the Gerard Doustraat in Amsterdam, Netherlands

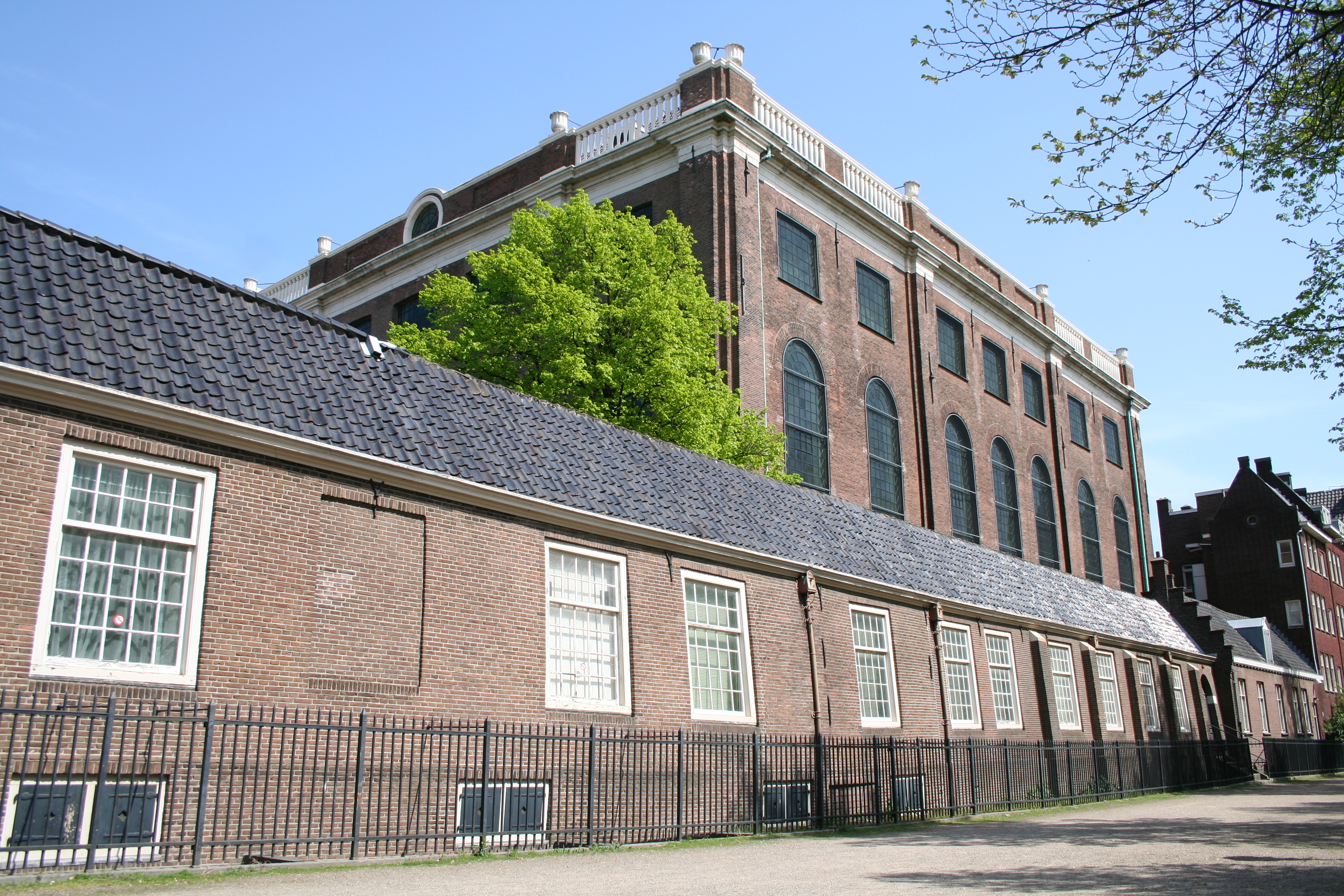
The Portuguese Synagogue in Amsterdam, Netherlands

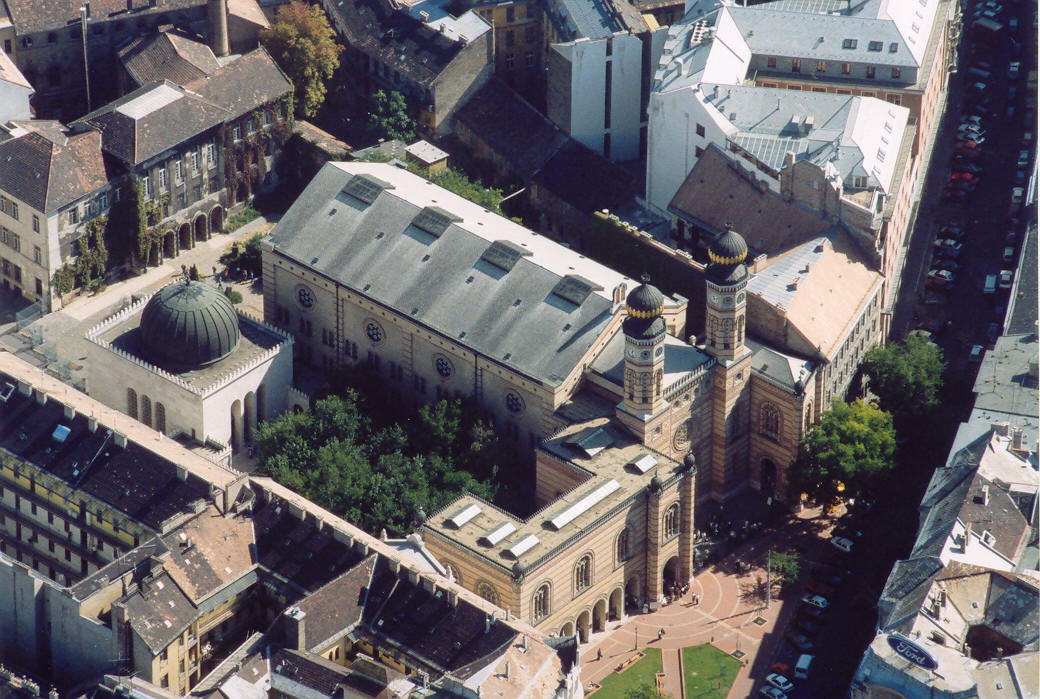
The Dohány Street Synagogue in Budapest, Hungary

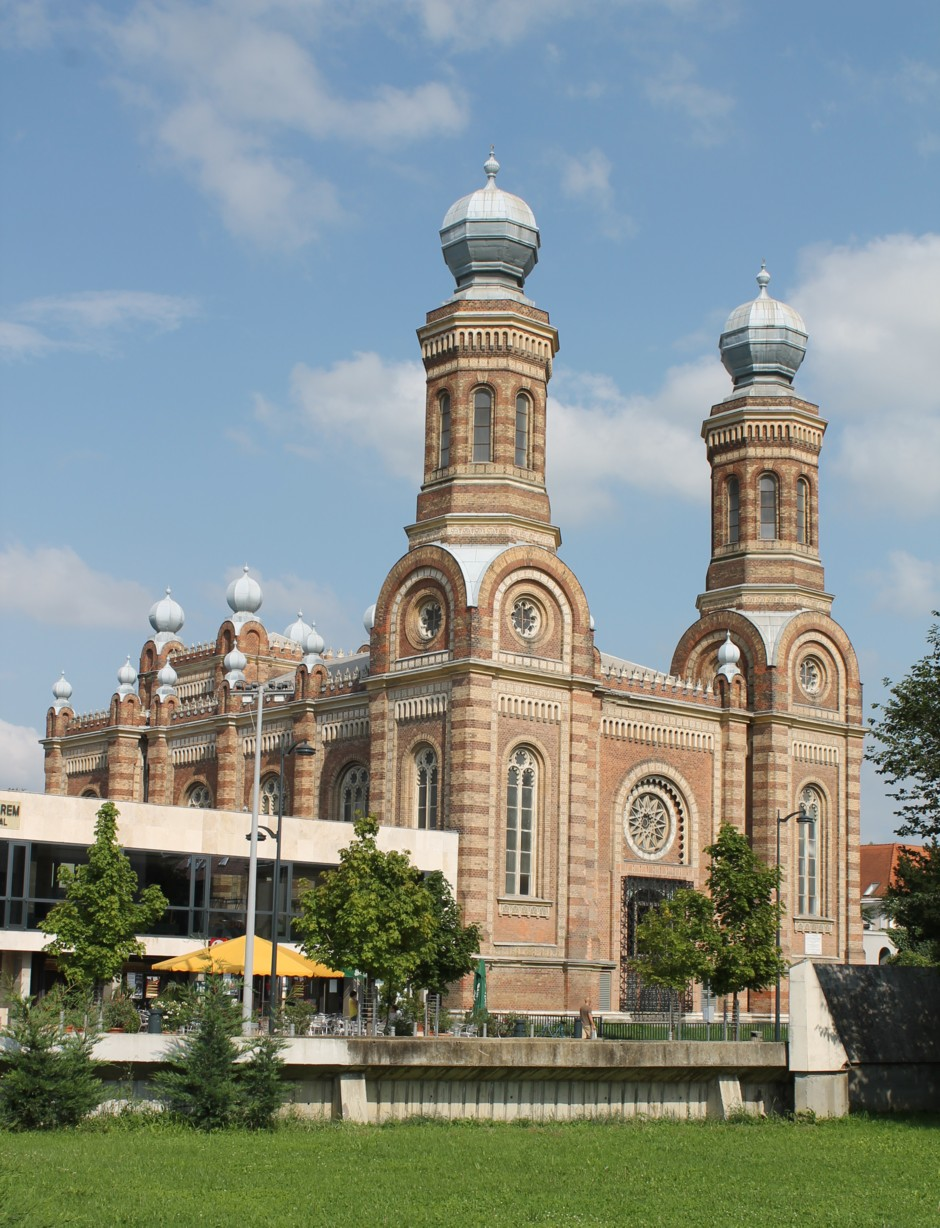
Synagogue, Szombathely, Hungary

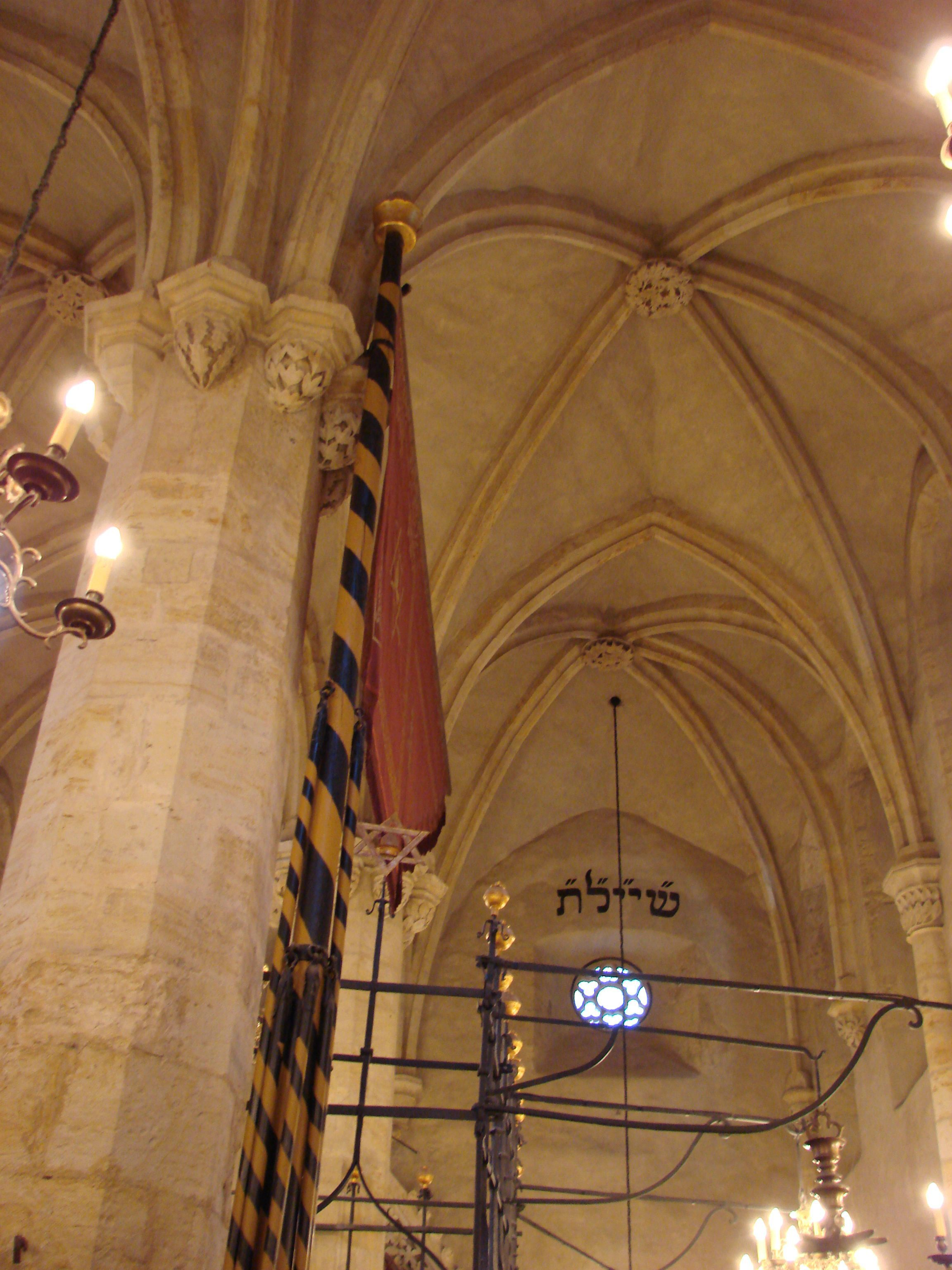
Gothic interior of the 13th-century Old New Synagogue of Prague, Czech Republic

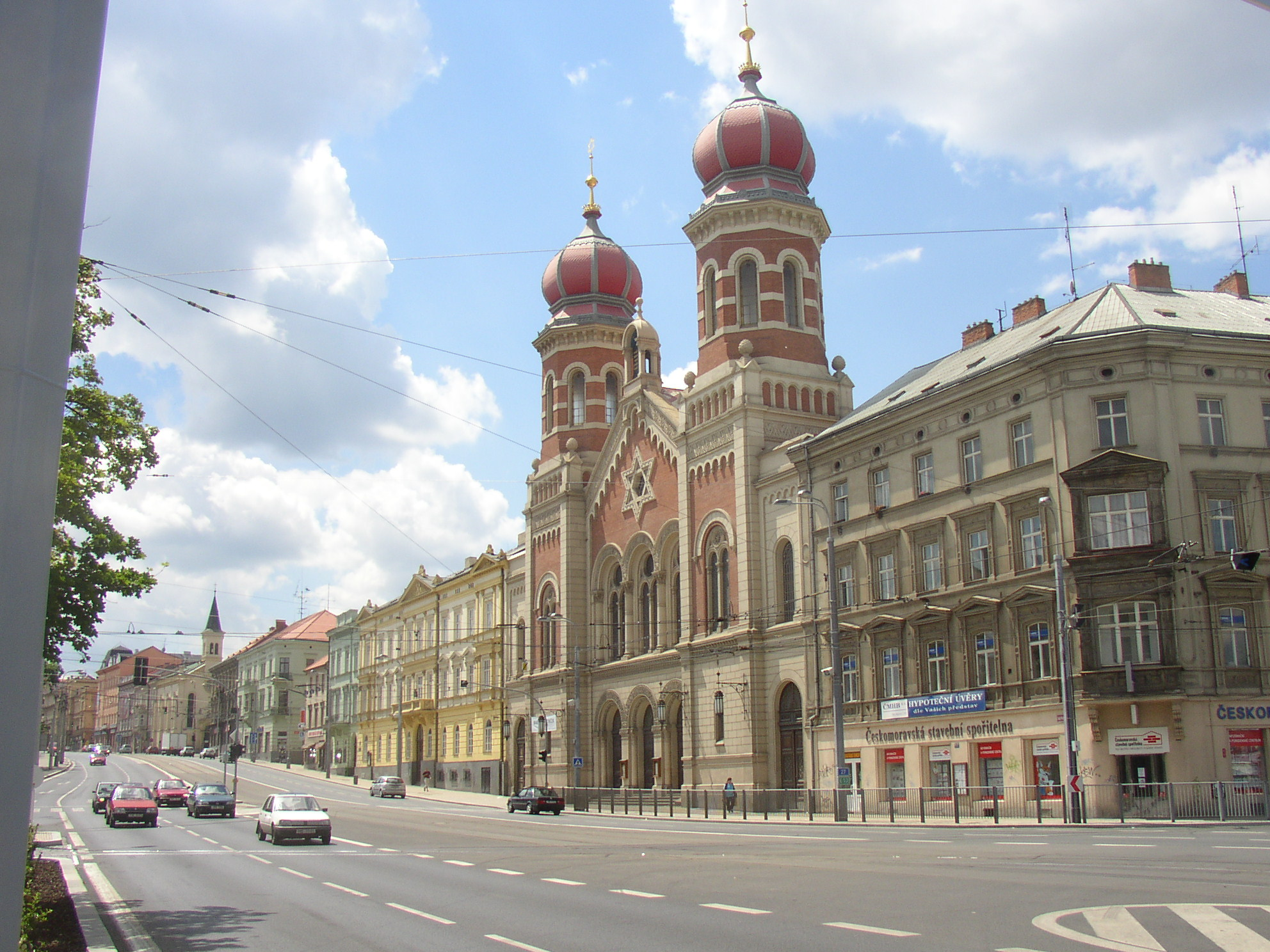
The Great Synagogue in Plzeň, Czech Republic

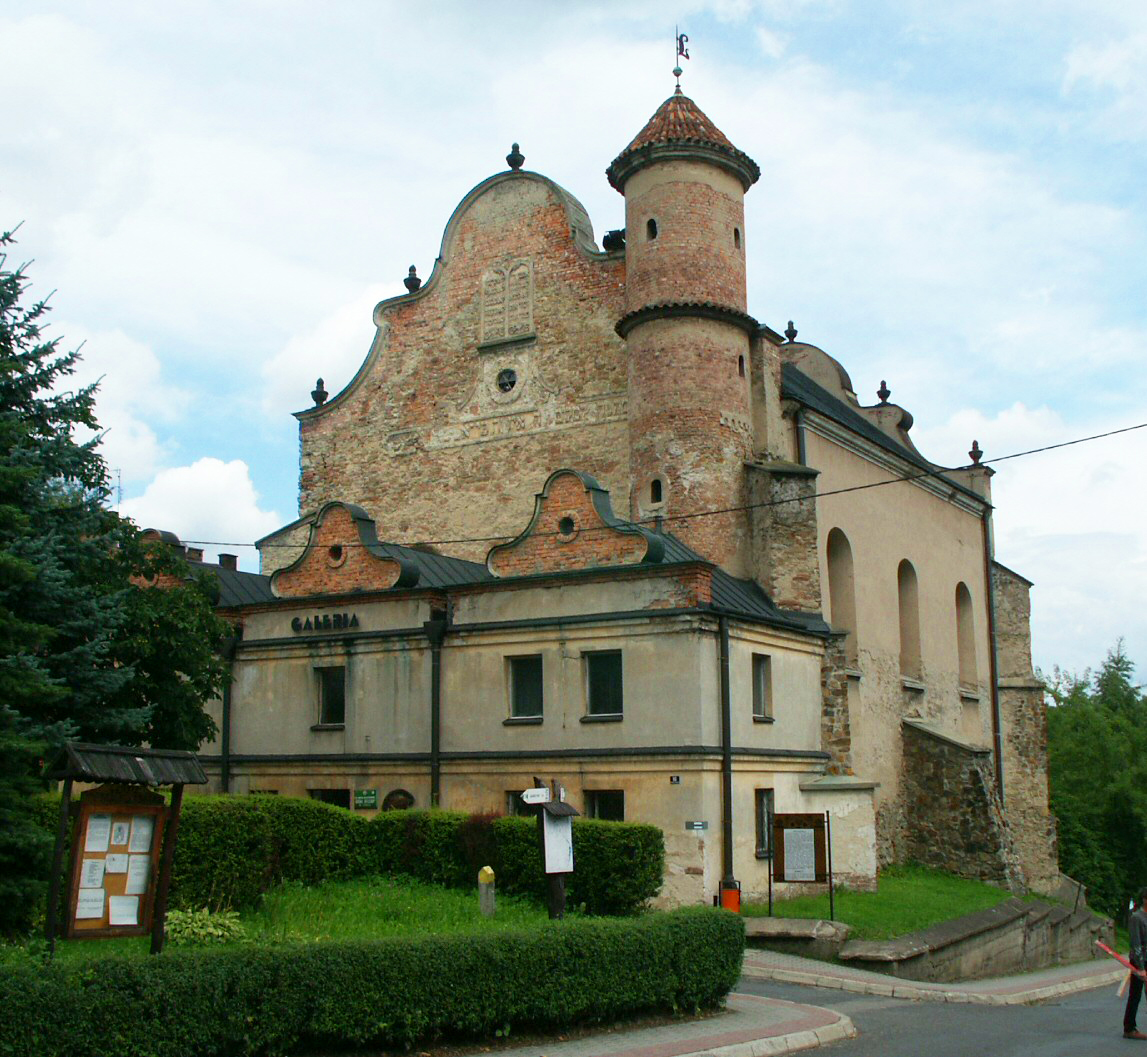
The Lesko Synagogue in Lesko, Poland

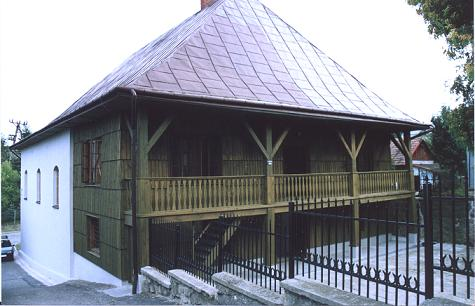
The Bobowa Synagogue in Bobowa, Poland

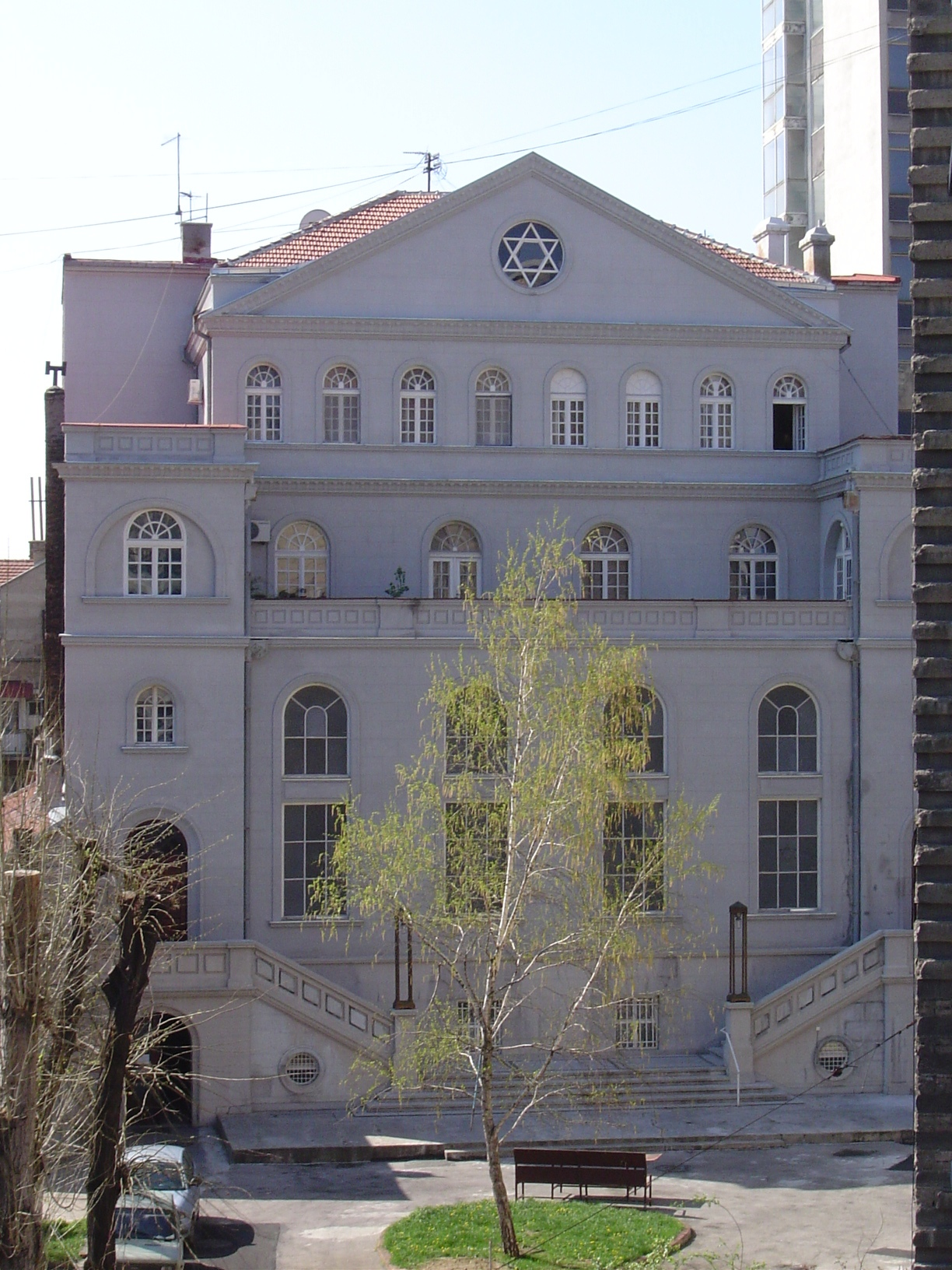
Sukkat Shalom Synagogue in Belgrade, Serbia

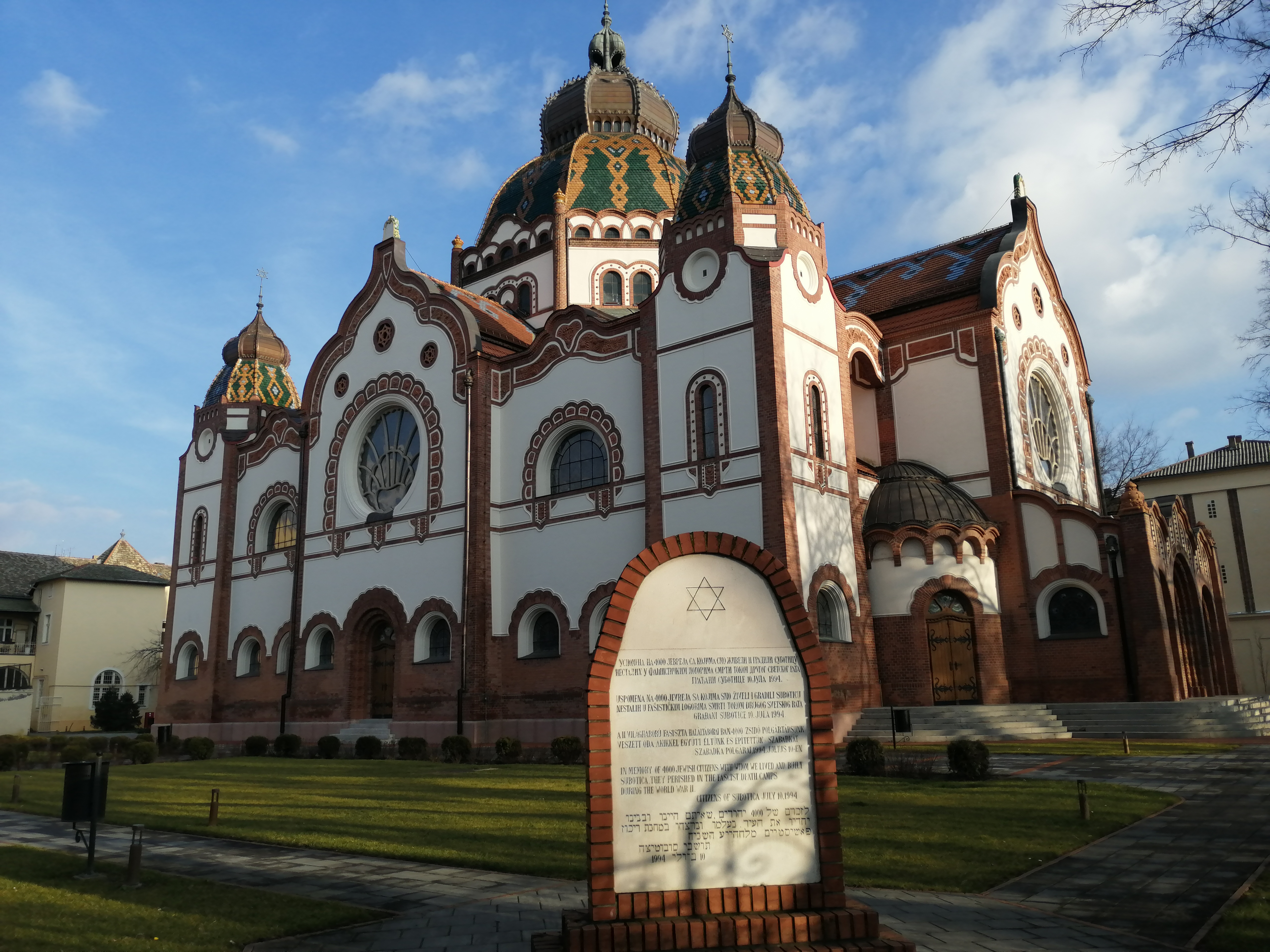
Jakab and Komor Square Synagogue in Subotica, Serbia

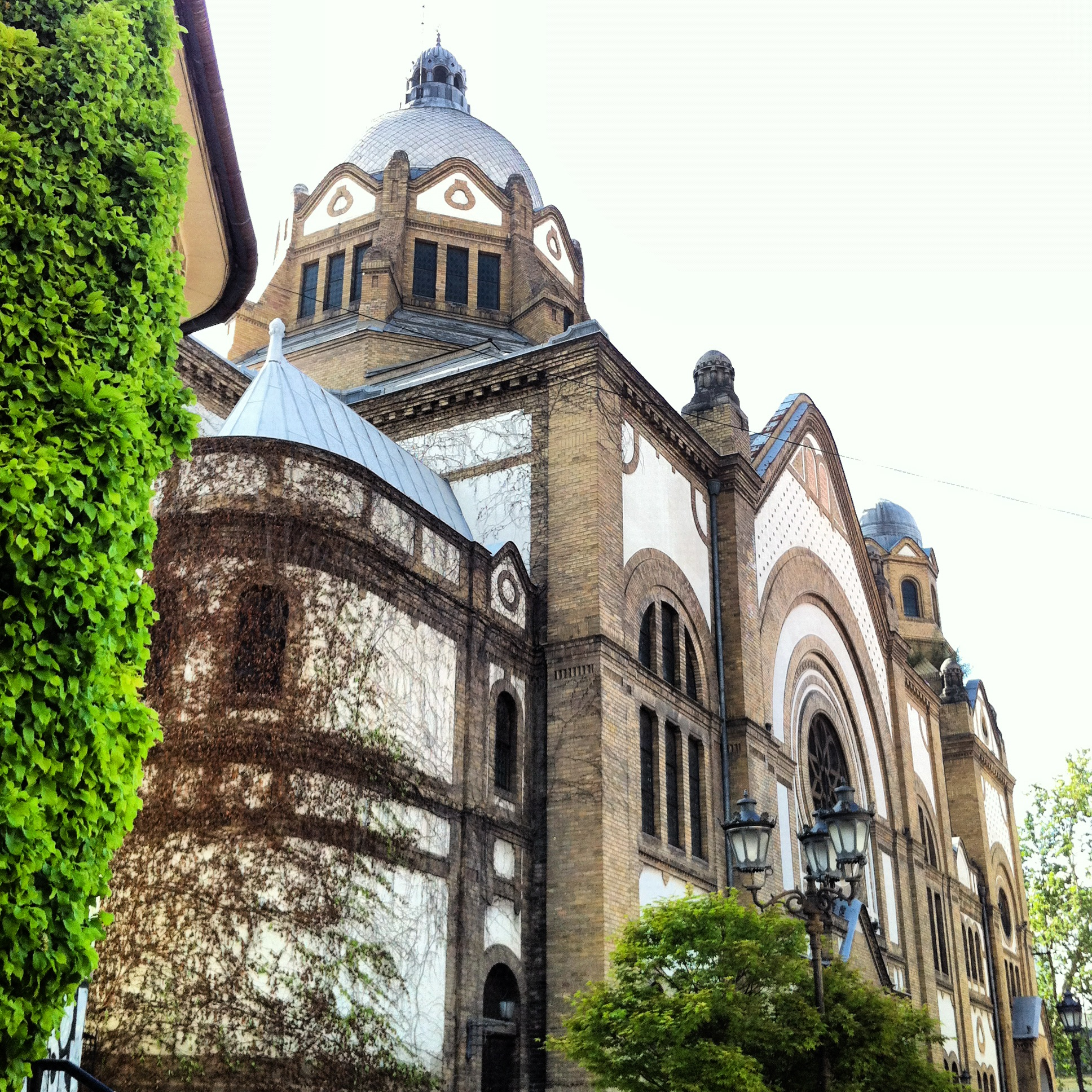
The Jewish Street Synagogue in Novi Sad, Serbia

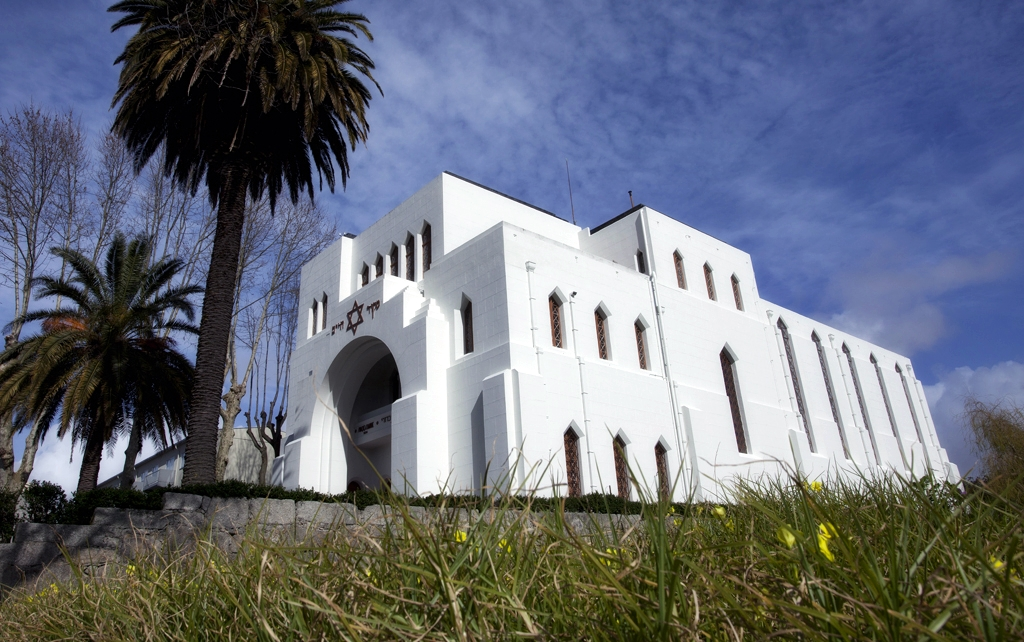
Kadoorie Synagogue in Porto, Portugal, the largest synagogue in the Iberian Peninsula

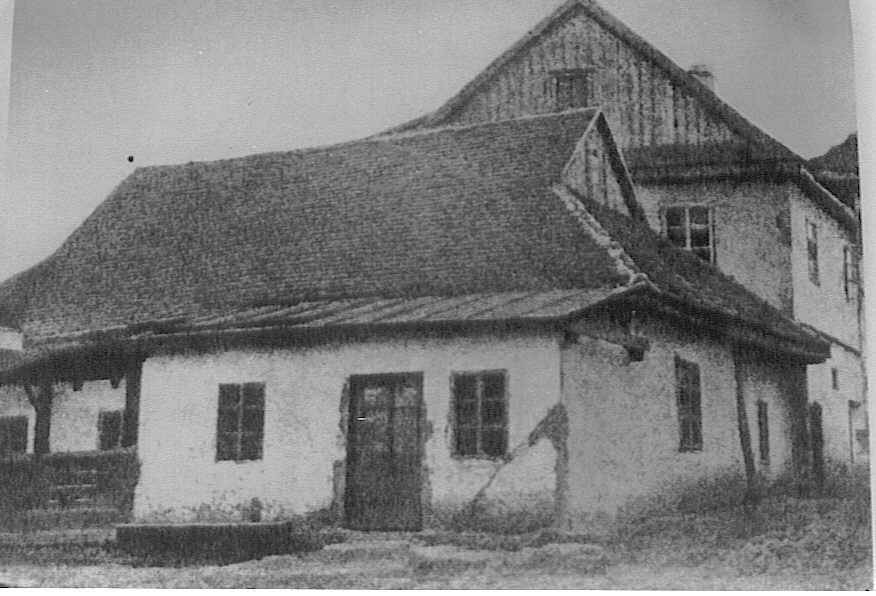
The Baal Shem Tov's shul in Medzhybizh, Ukraine (c. 1915), destroyed and recently rebuilt

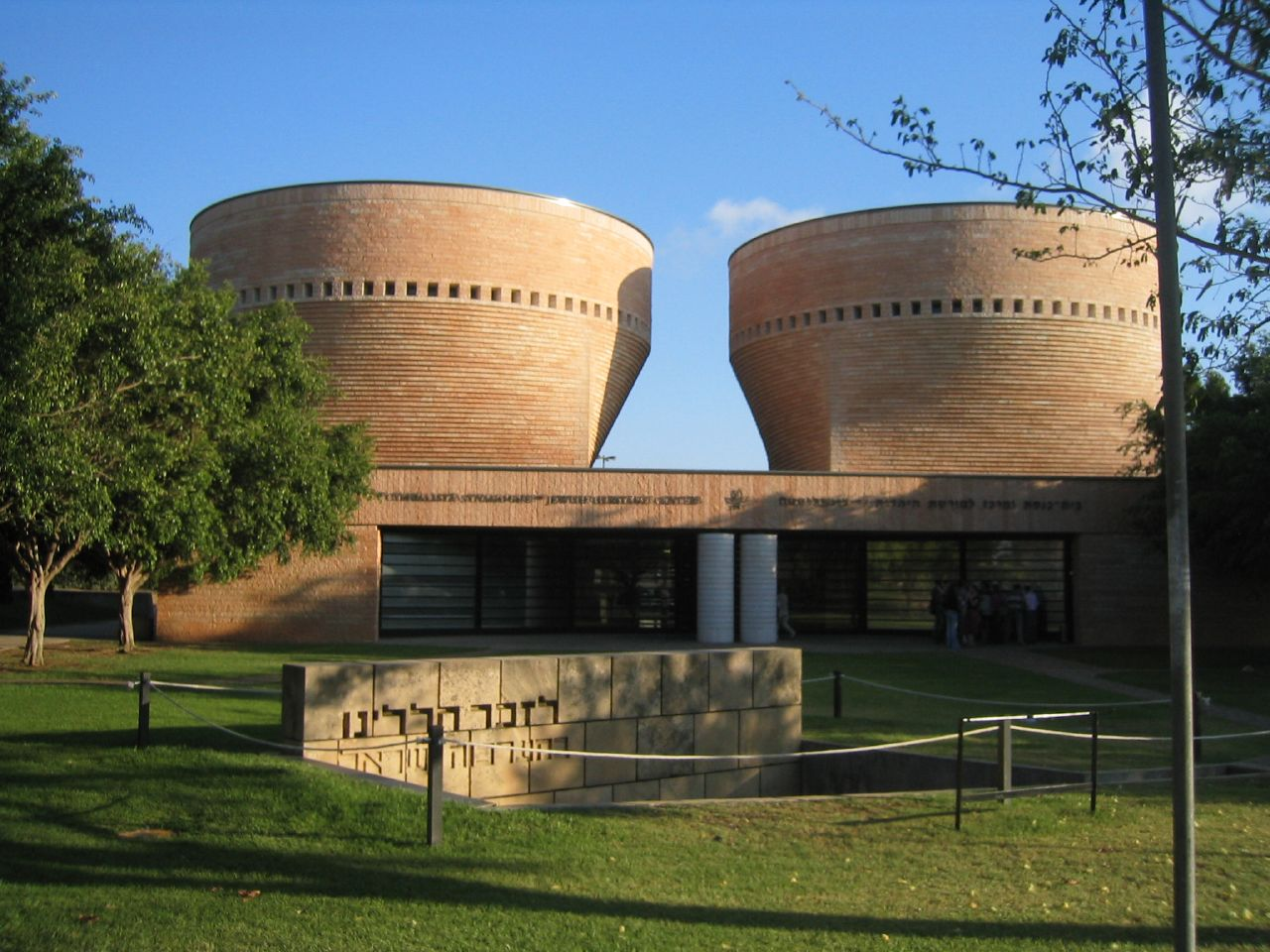
The Cymbalista Synagogue and Jewish Heritage Center at Tel Aviv University

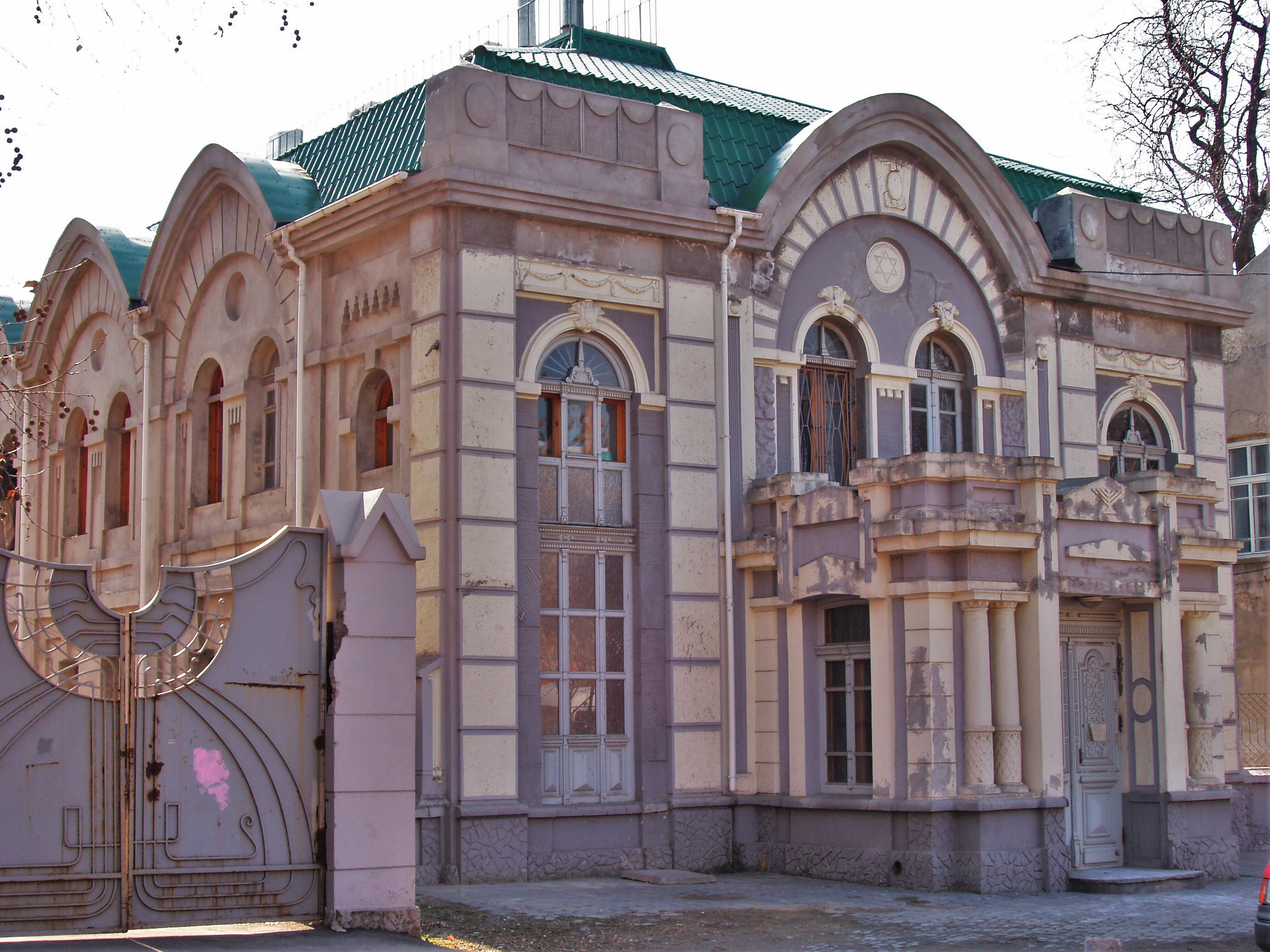
The synagogue of Kherson, Ukraine

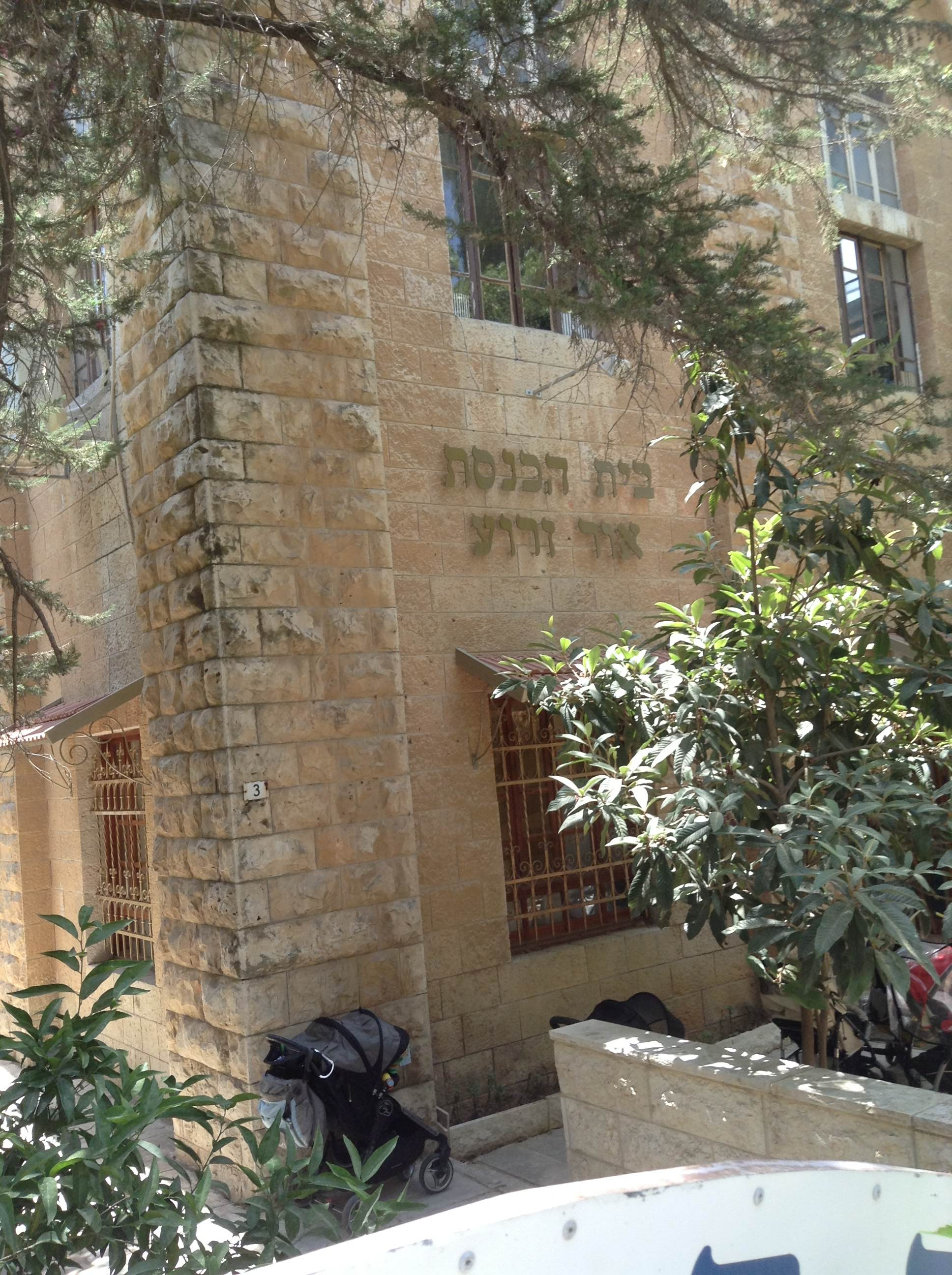
Or Zaruaa Synagogue, Jerusalem, Israel, founded in 1926.

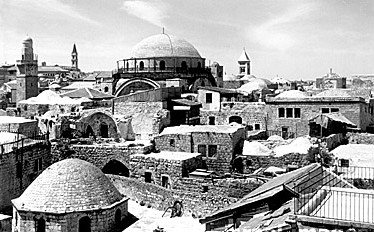
The Hurva Synagogue towered over the Jewish Quarter of Jerusalem from 1864 until 1948, when it was destroyed in war.

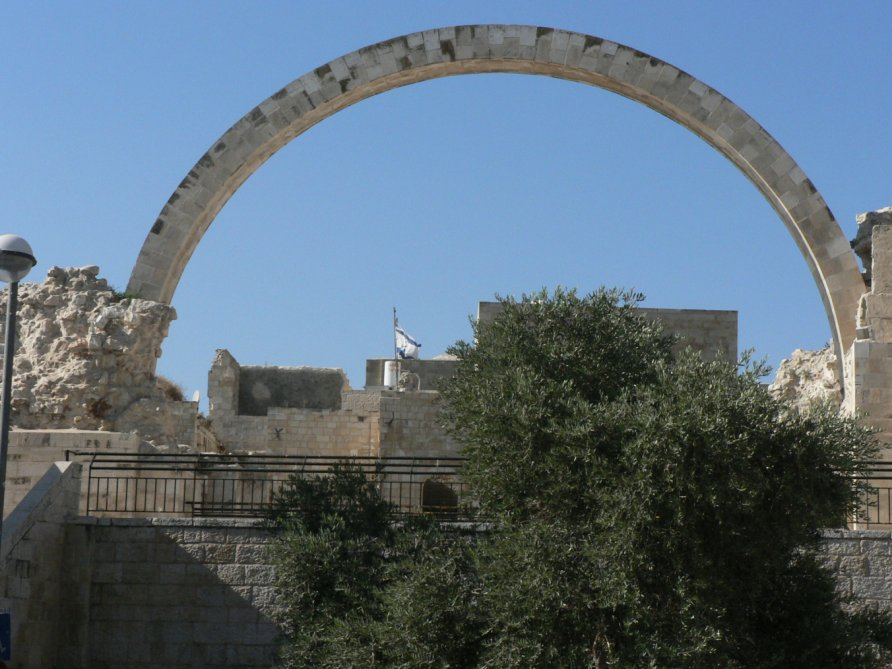
The remains of the Hurva Synagogue as they appeared from 1977 to 2003. The synagogue has been rebuilt in 2010.

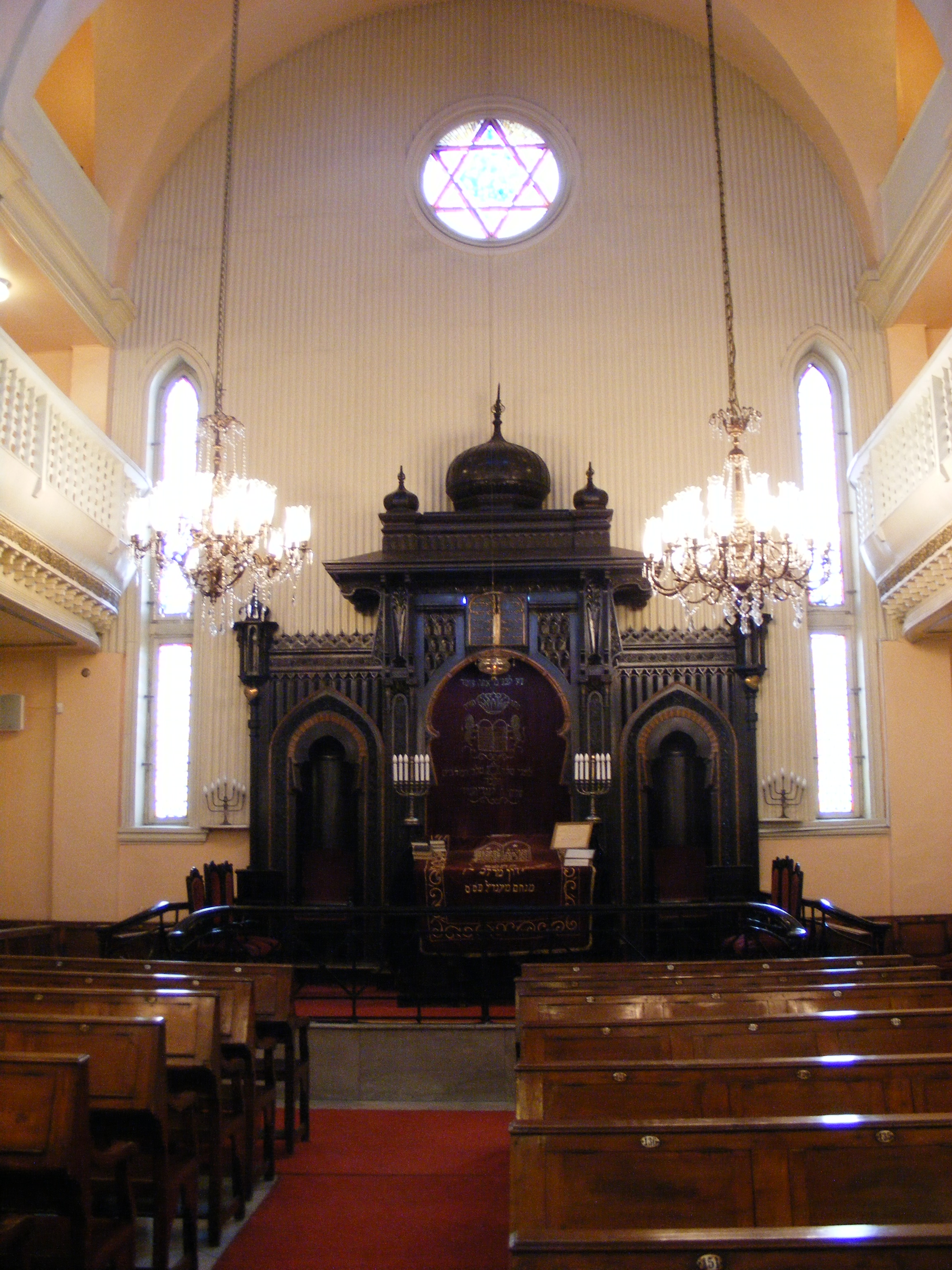
The Ashkenazi Synagogue of Istanbul, Turkey

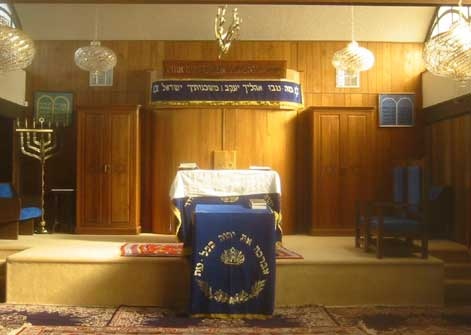
The interior of a Karaite synagogue

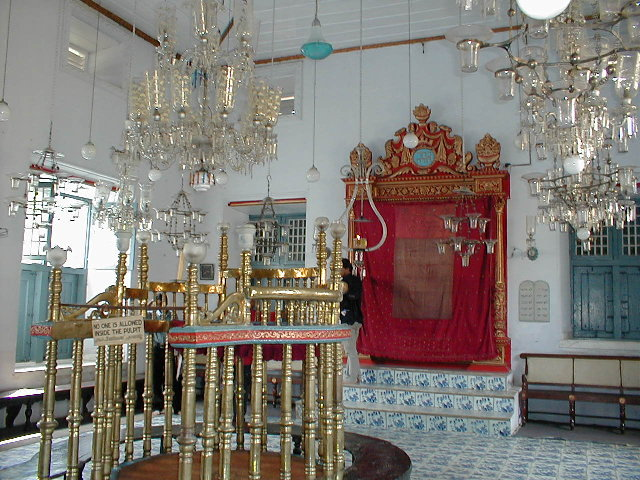
The Paradesi Synagogue in Kochi, India

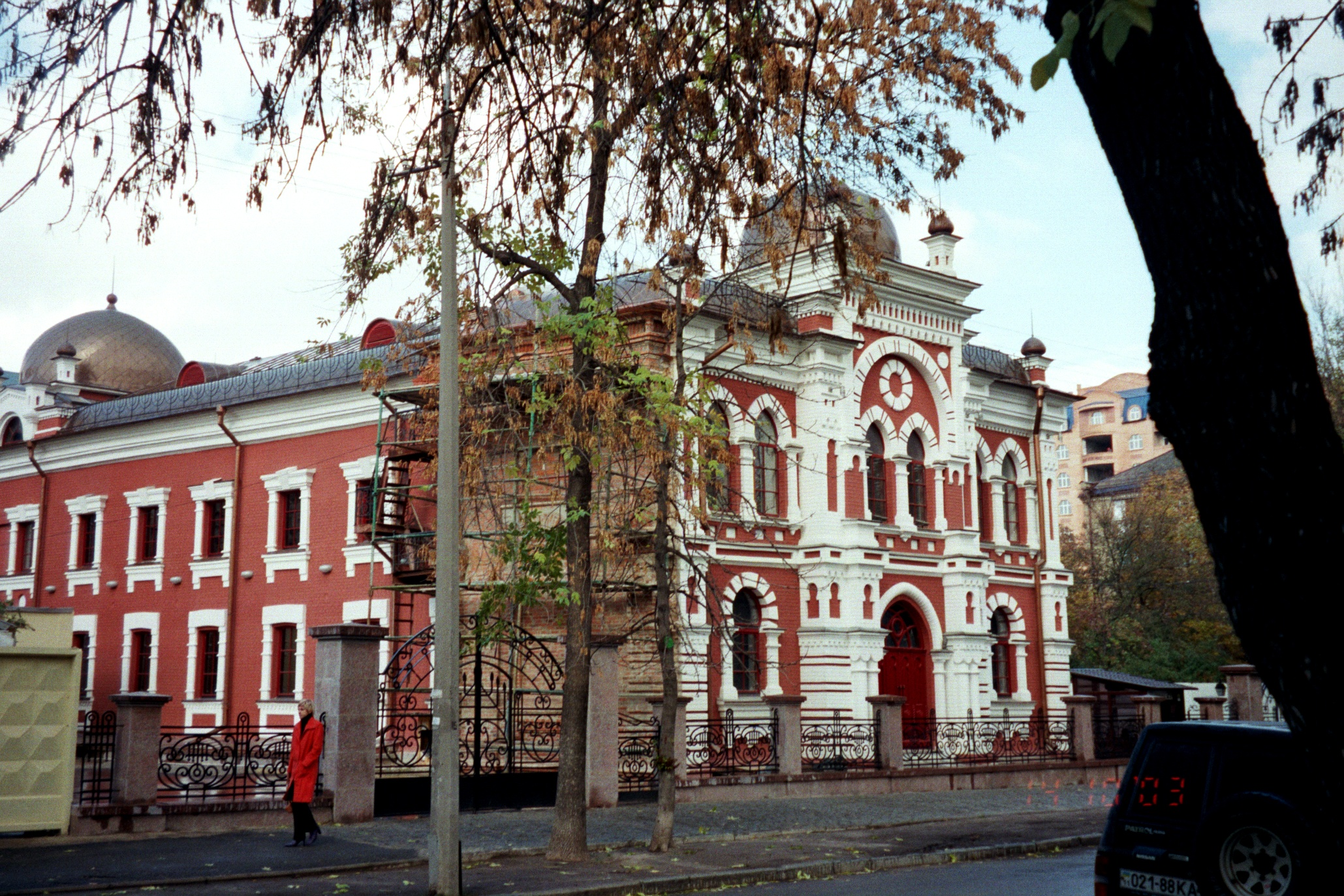
The Great Choral Synagogue in Kyiv, Ukraine

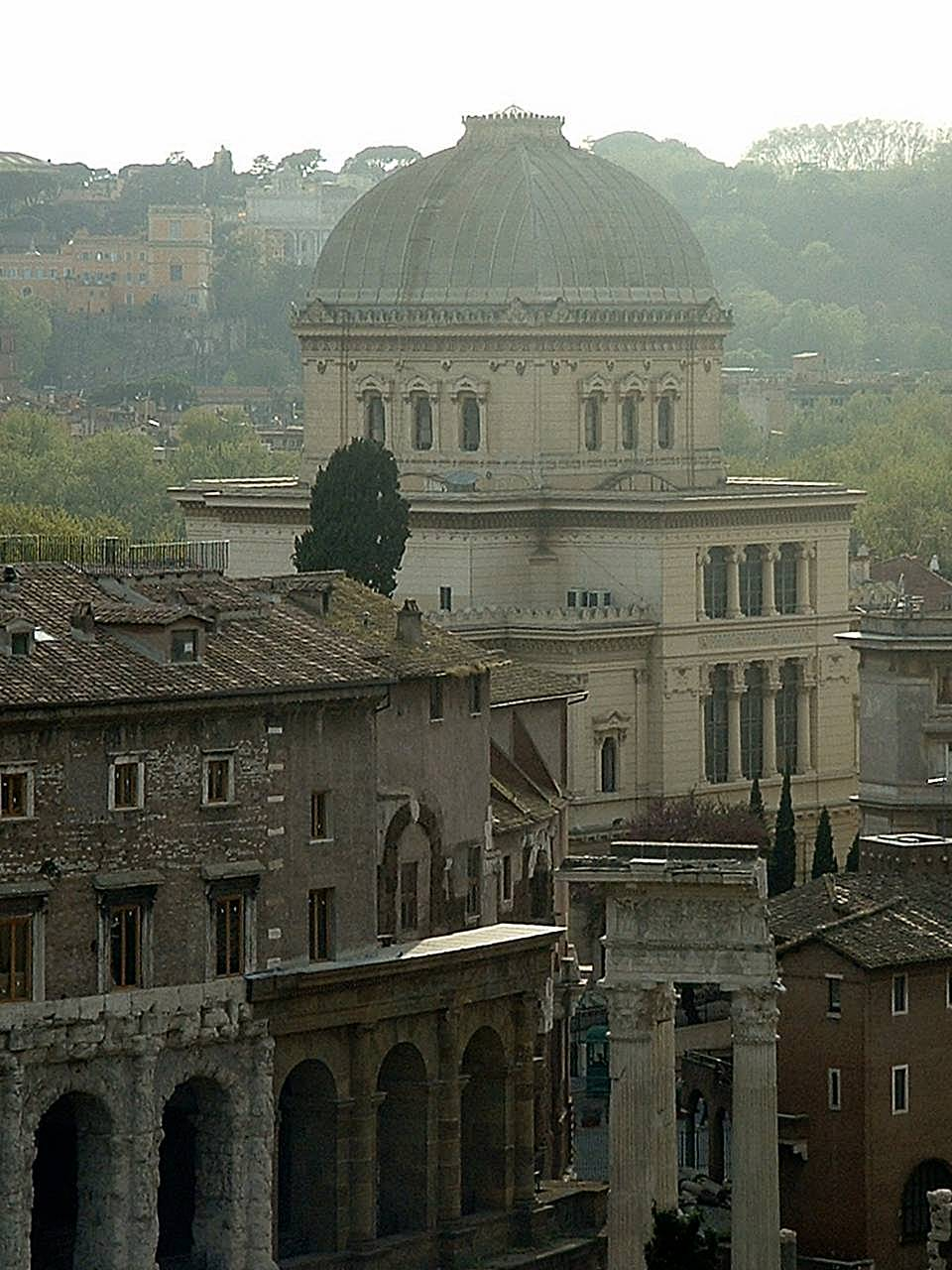
Great Synagogue of Rome, Italy

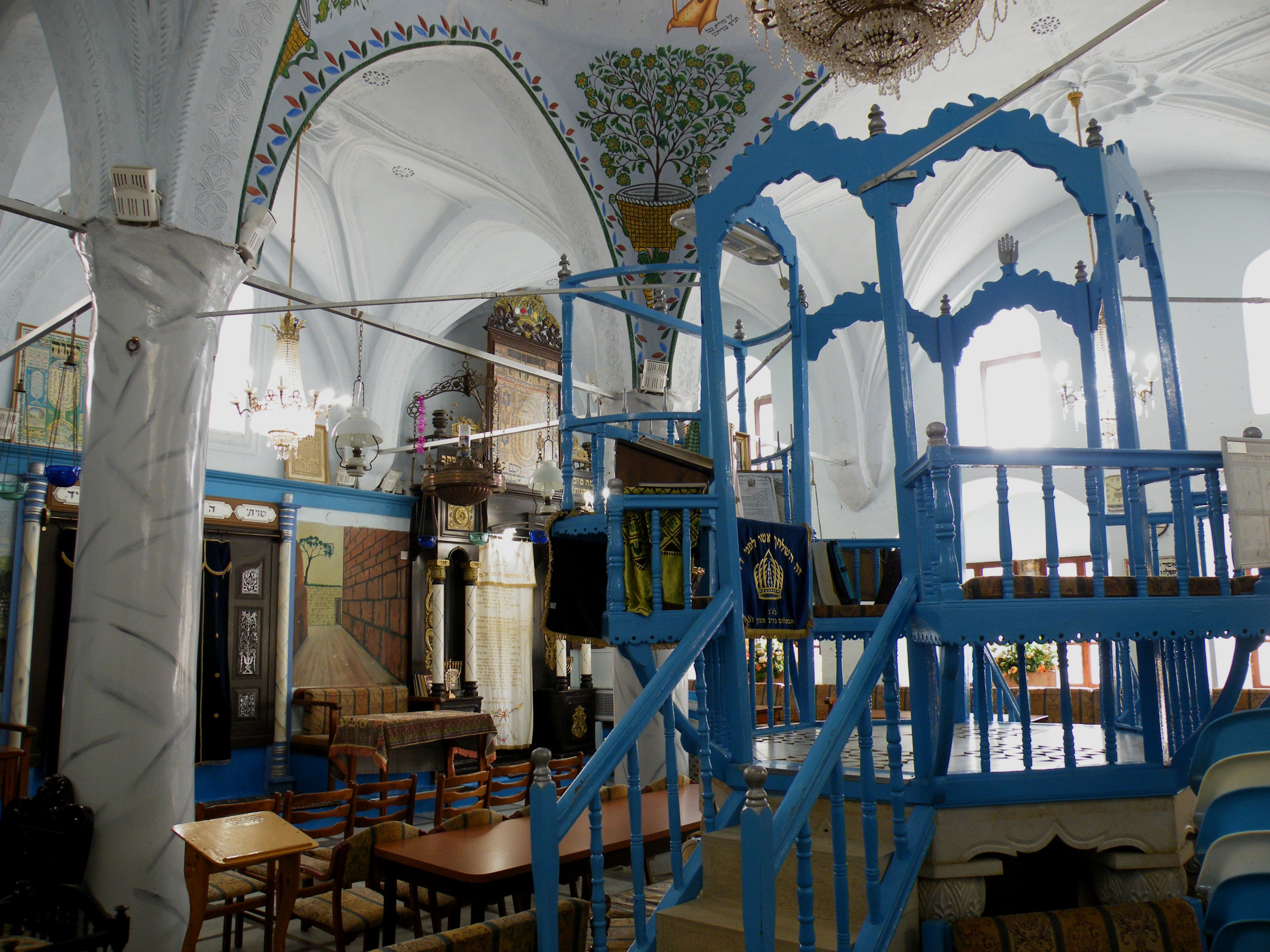
Abuhav synagogue, Israel

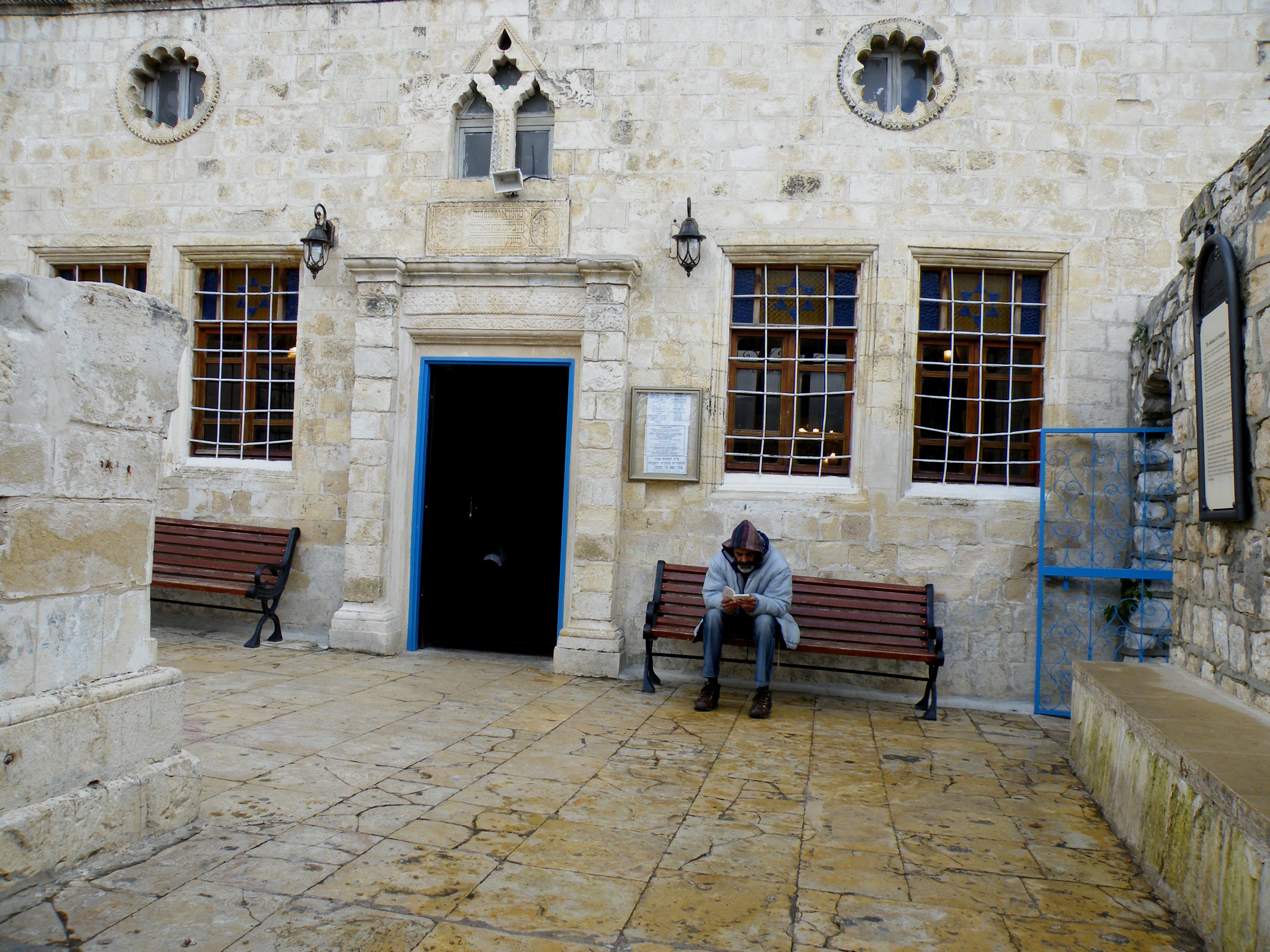
Ari Ashkenazi Synagogue, Israel

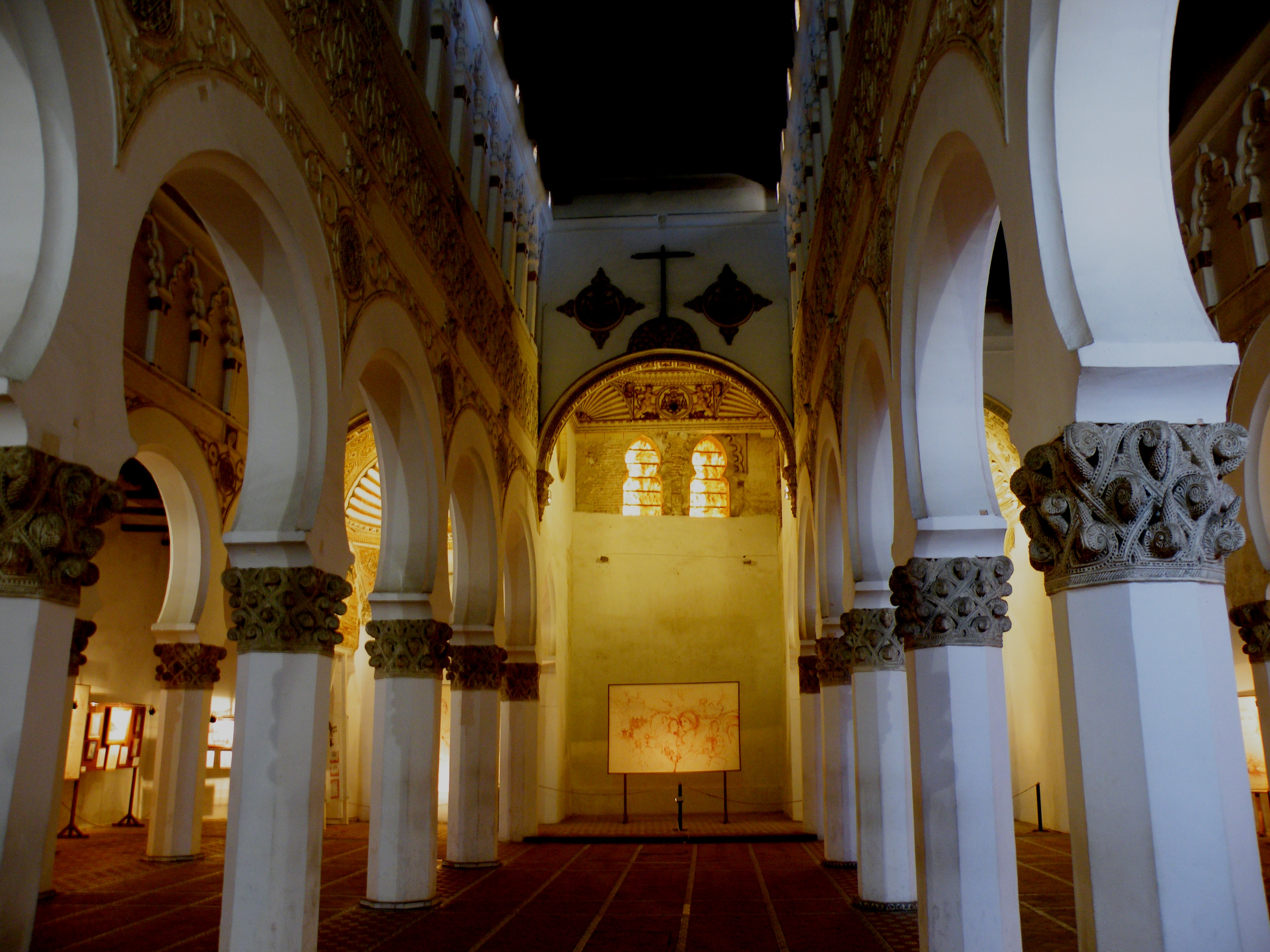
Santa María la Blanca, Spain

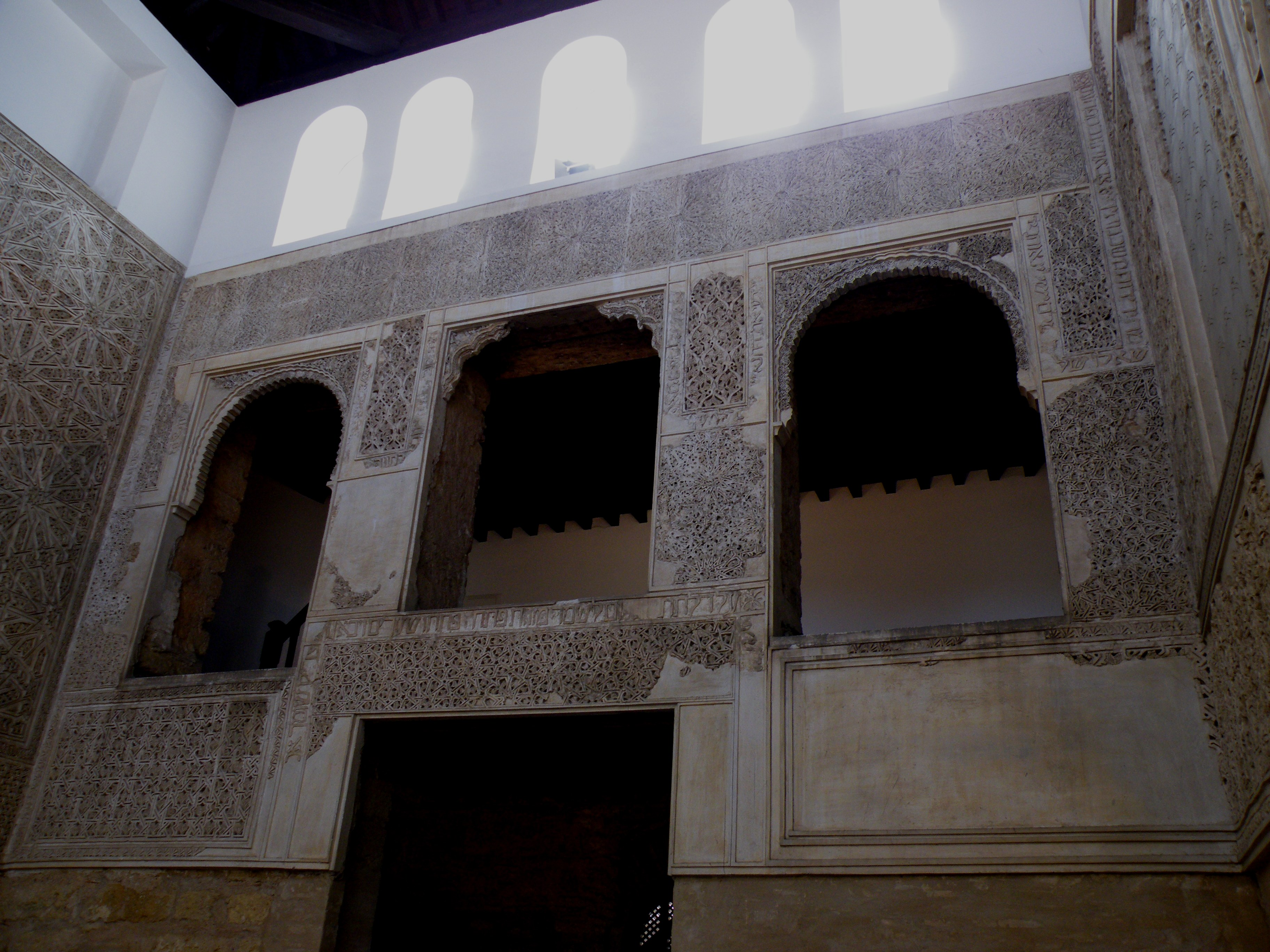
Córdoba Synagogue, Spain

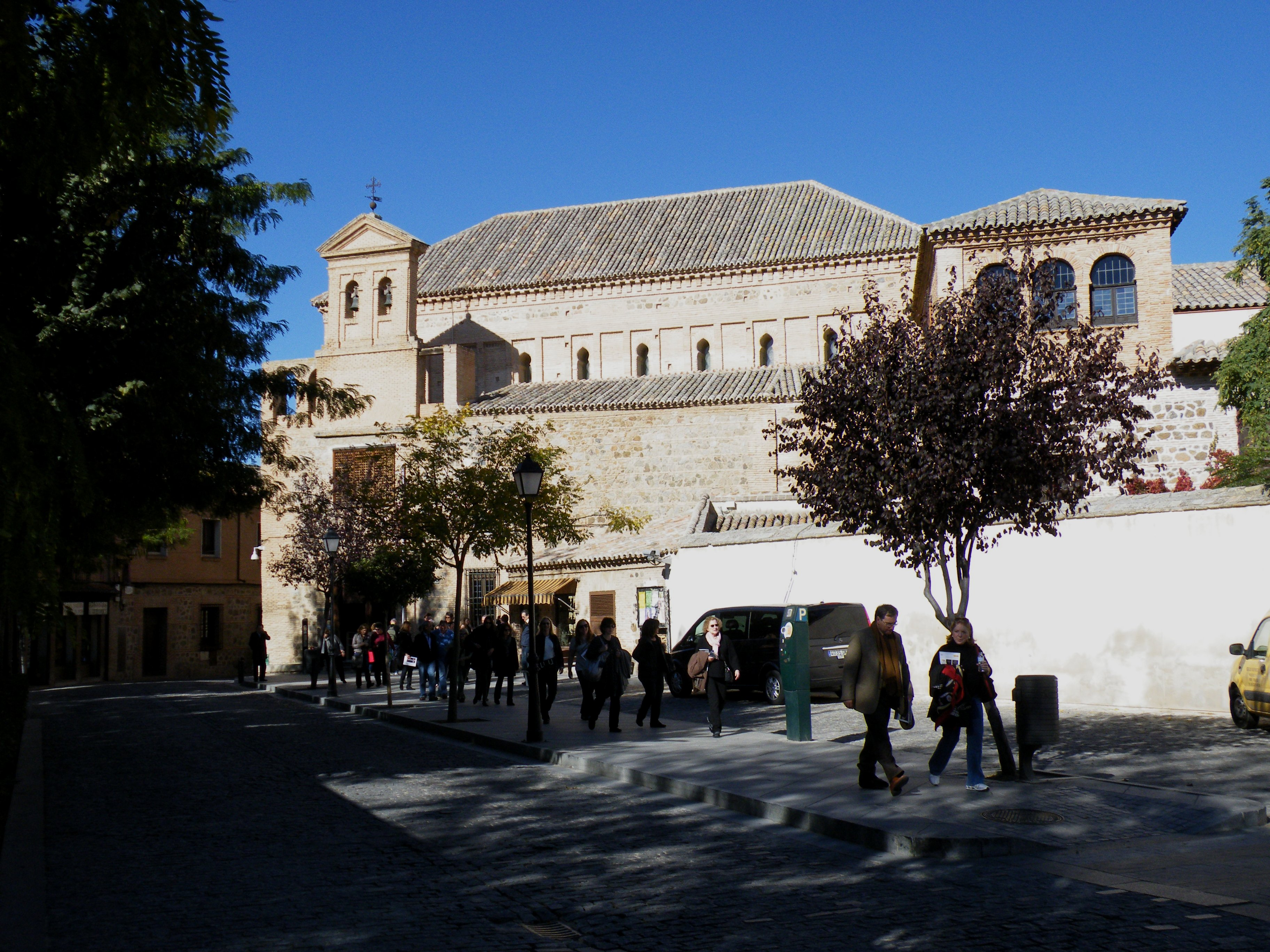
El Transito Synagogue, Spain

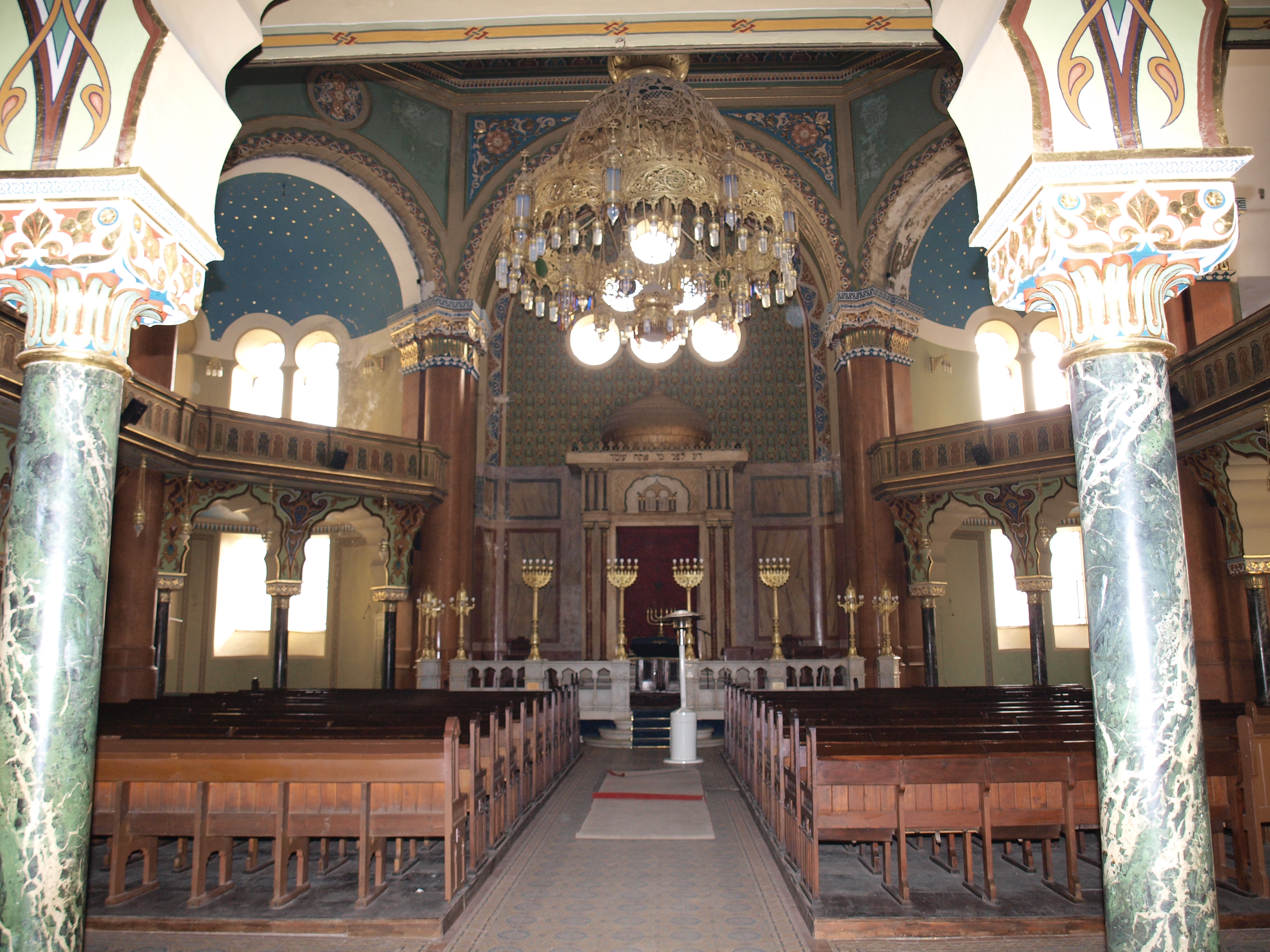
Sofia Synagogue, Bulgaria

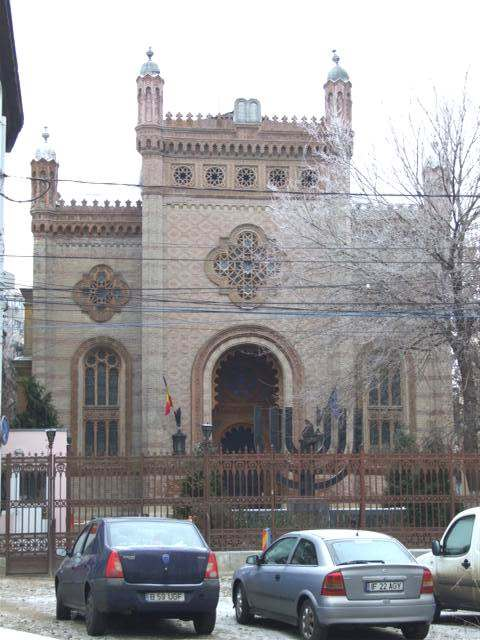
The Choral Temple, Bucharest, Romania

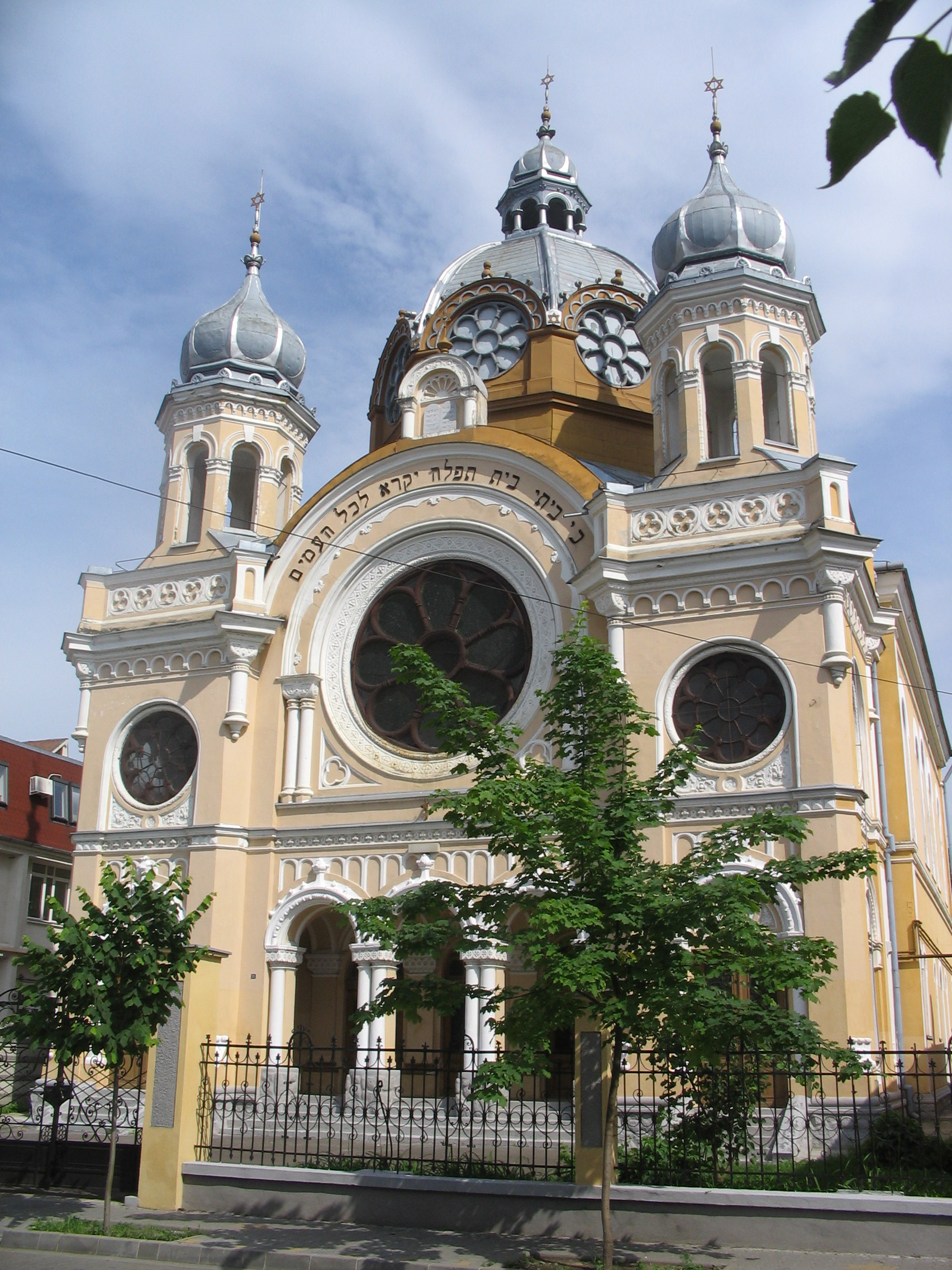
Synagogue of Târgu Mureș, Romania

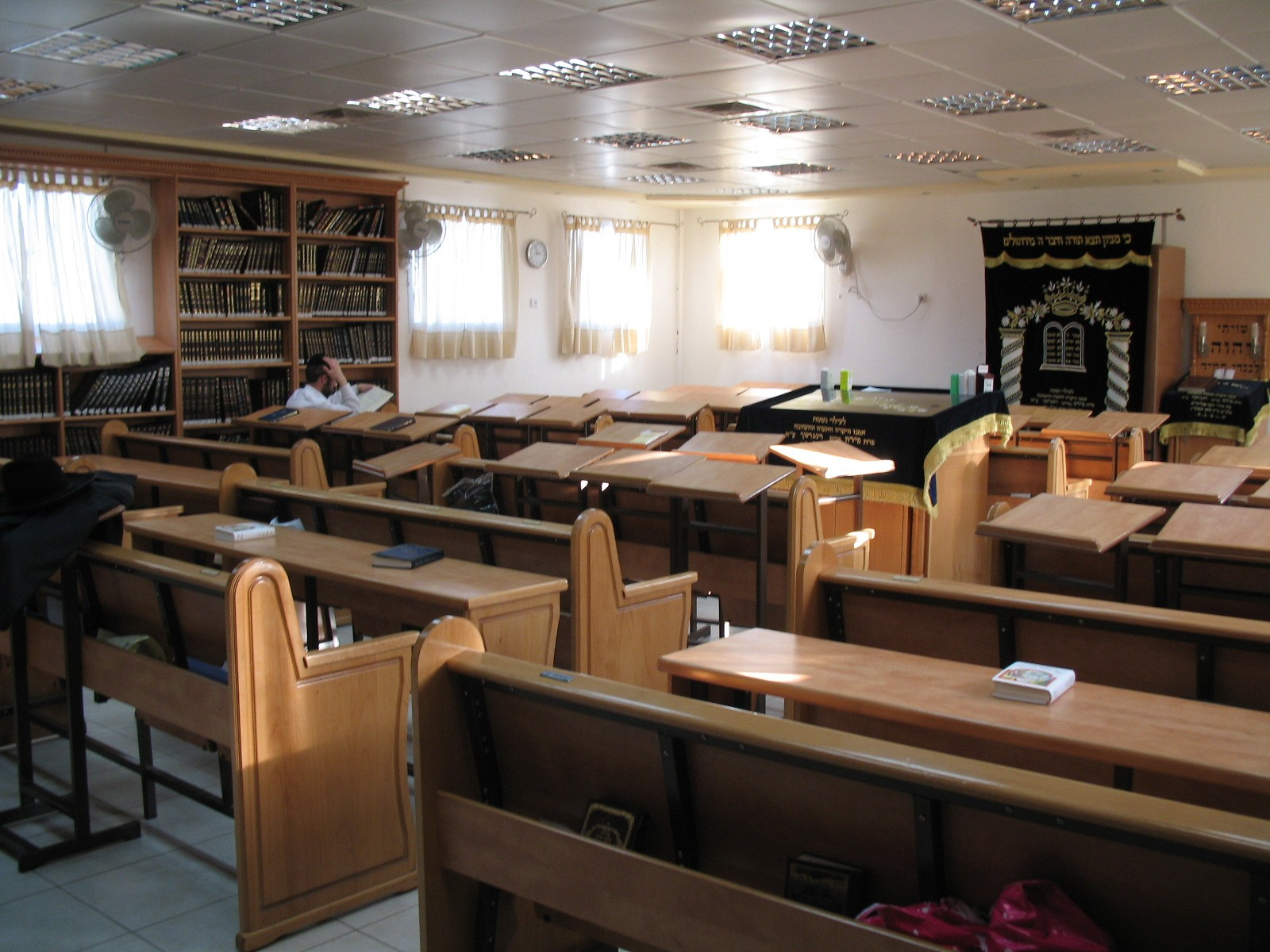
Interior of a "caravan shul" (synagogue housed in a trailer-type facility), Neve Yaakov, Jerusalem

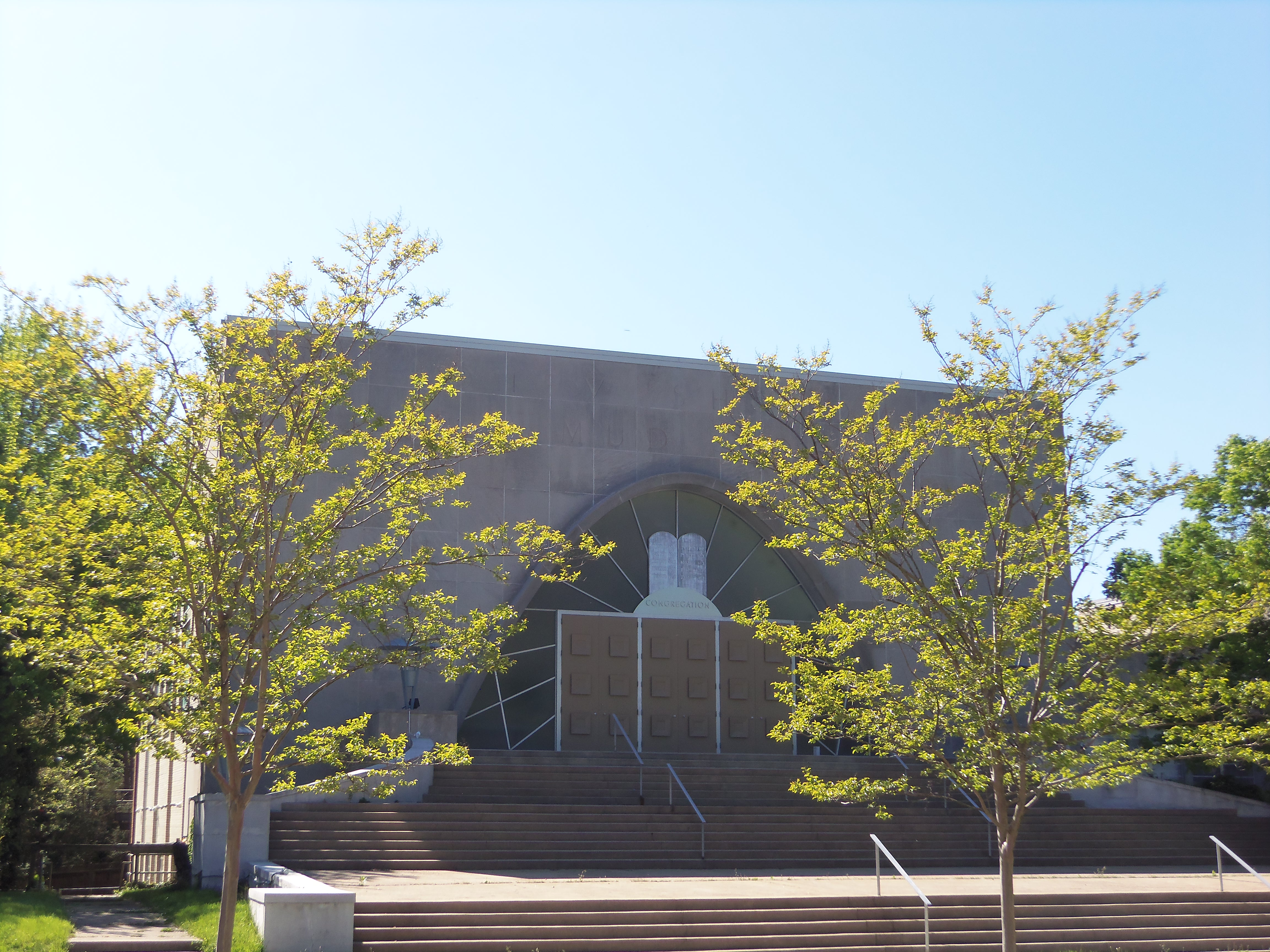
Ohev Sholom – The National Synagogue in Washington, D.C.

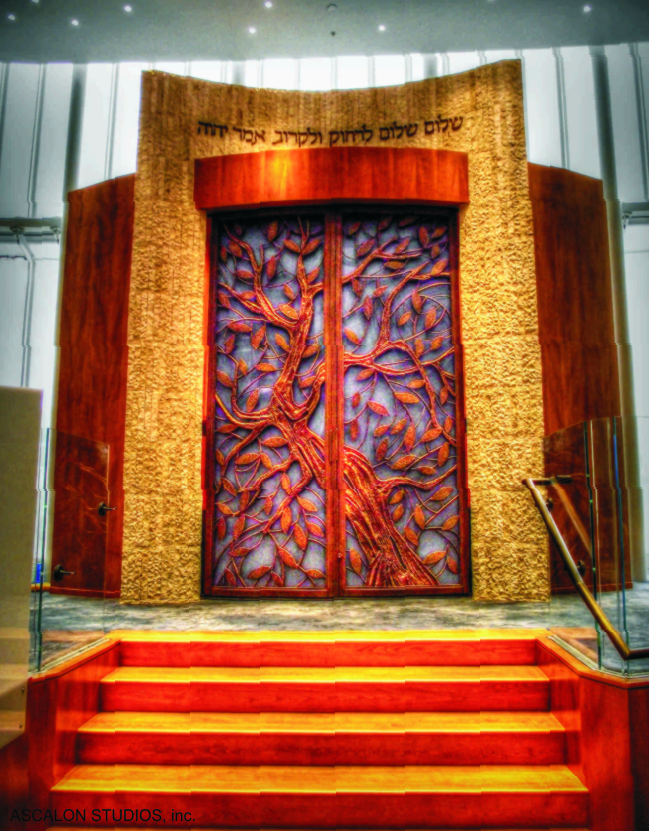
Sanctuary ark, Lincoln Square Synagogue, New York City (2013), created by David Ascalon

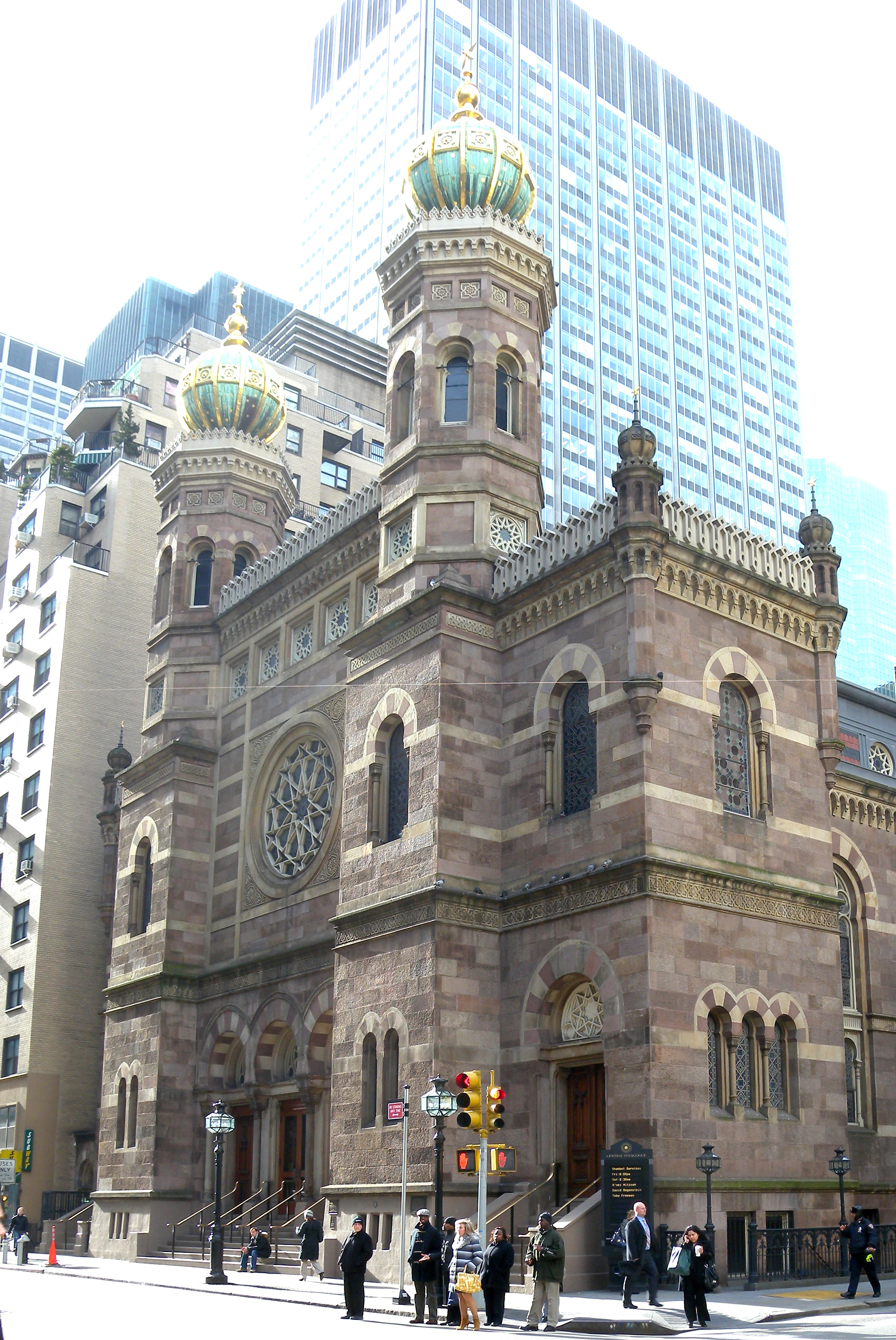
The Central Synagogue in Manhattan, New York City

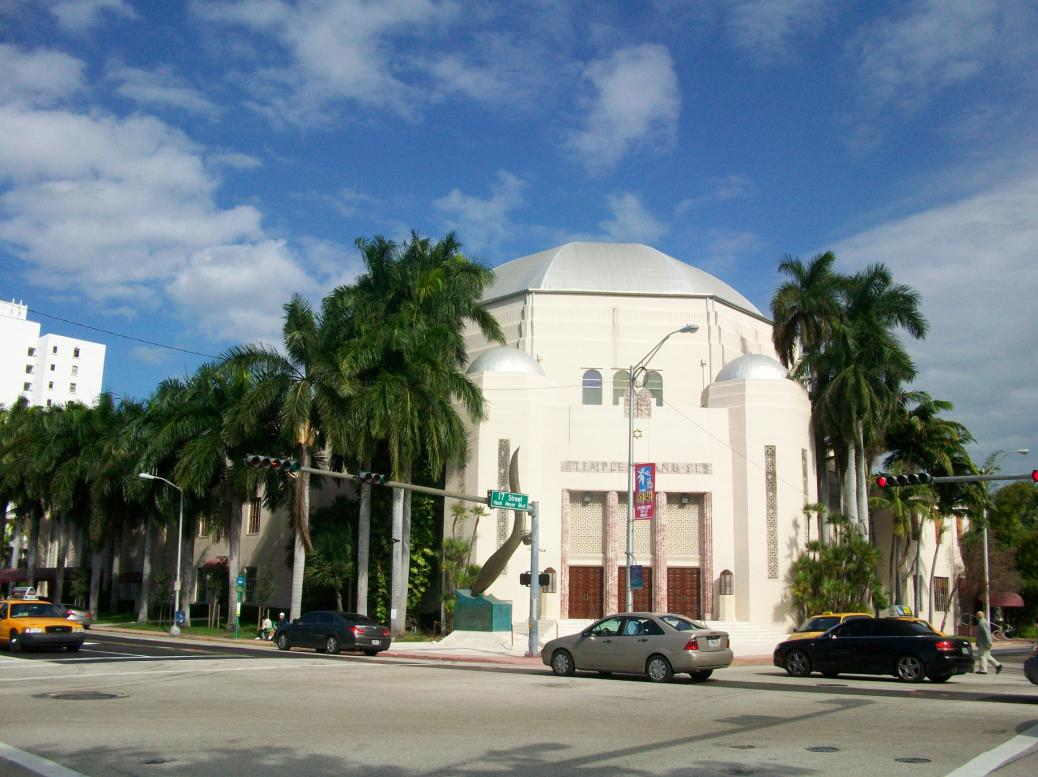
Temple Emanu-El, Neo-Byzantine style synagogue in Miami Beach, Florida

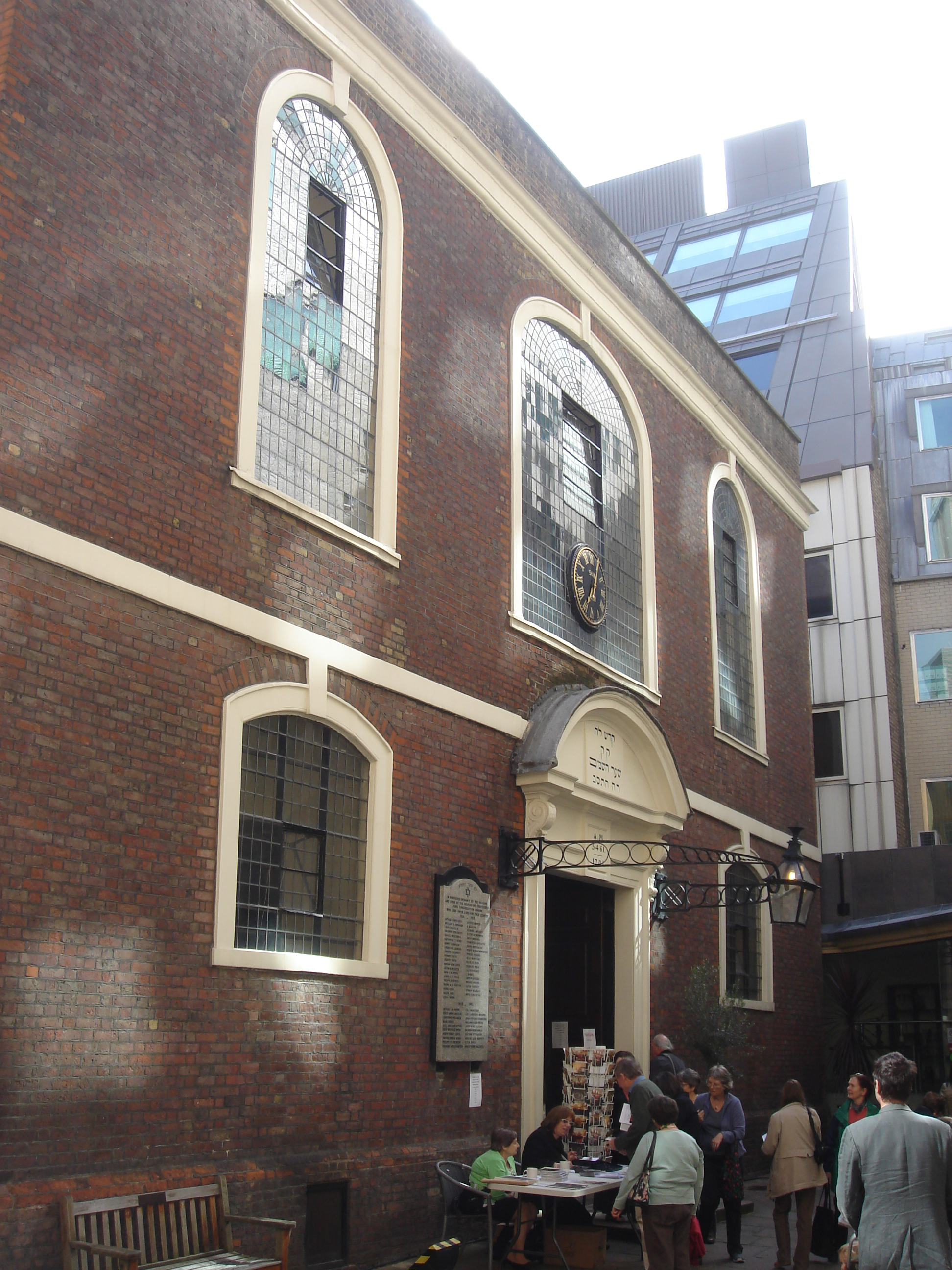
Bevis Marks Synagogue, City of London, the oldest synagogue in the United Kingdom

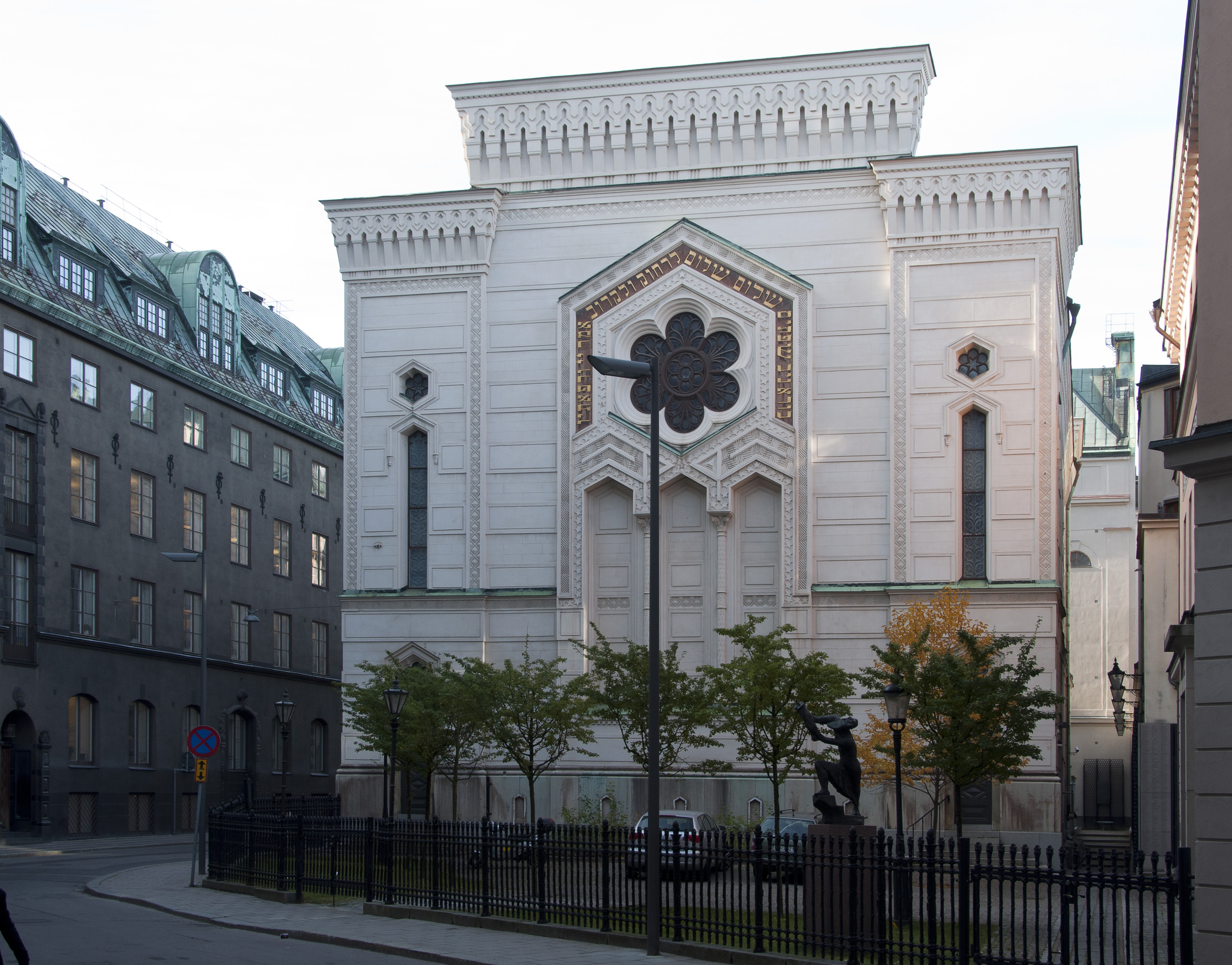
Stockholm Synagogue, Sweden

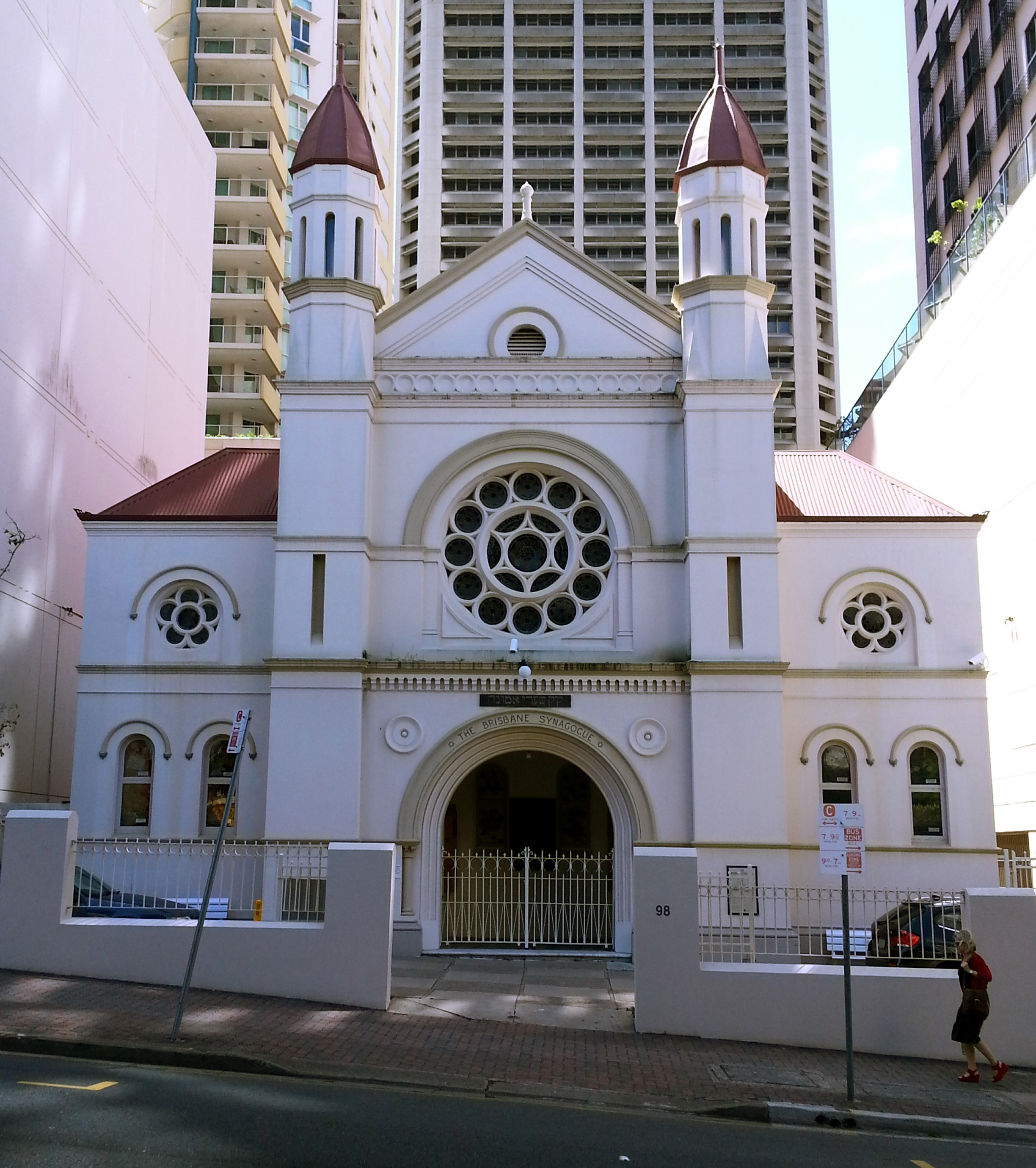
Brisbane Synagogue, Australia

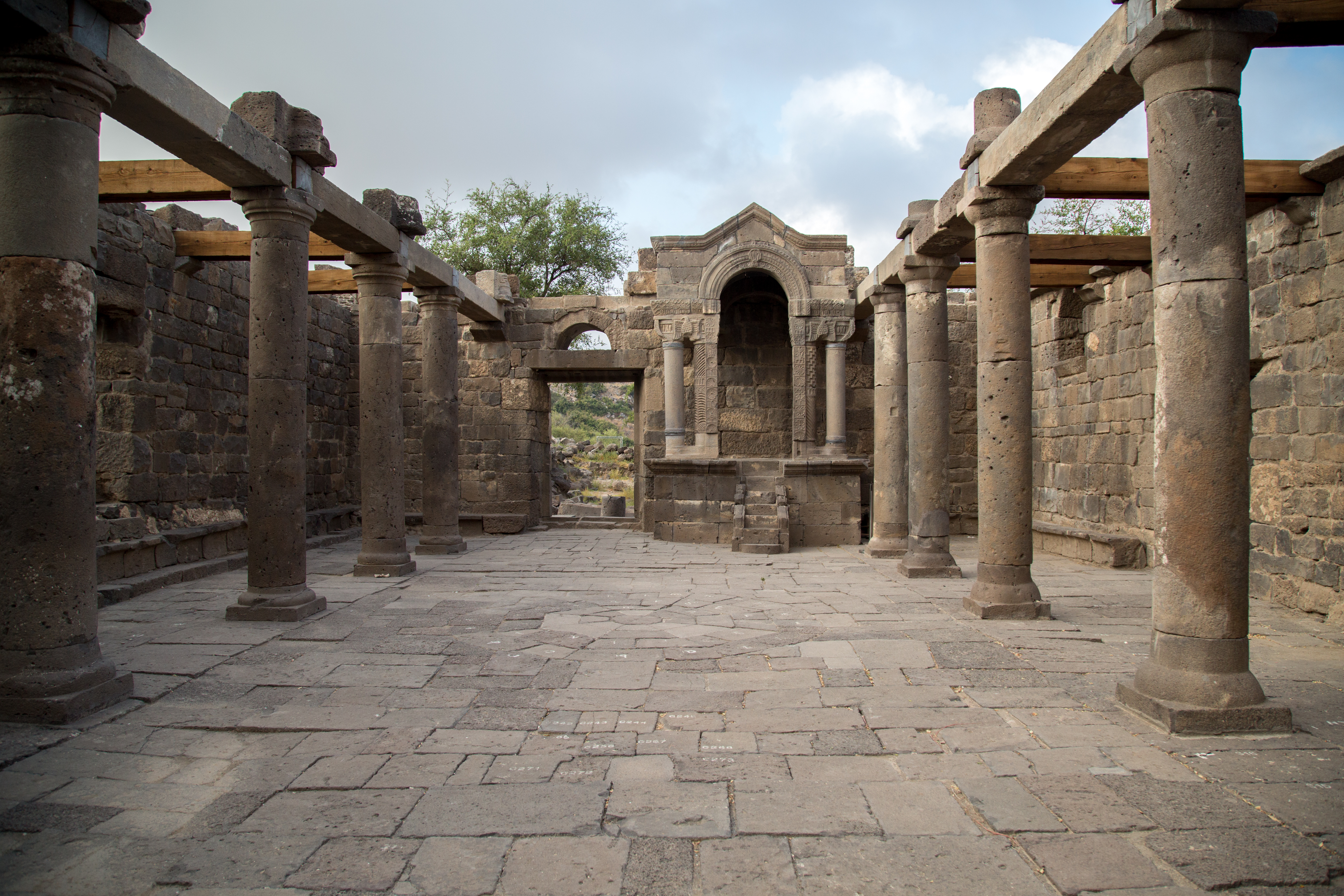
Ein Keshatot synagogue (active 5th–8th centuries), Israel

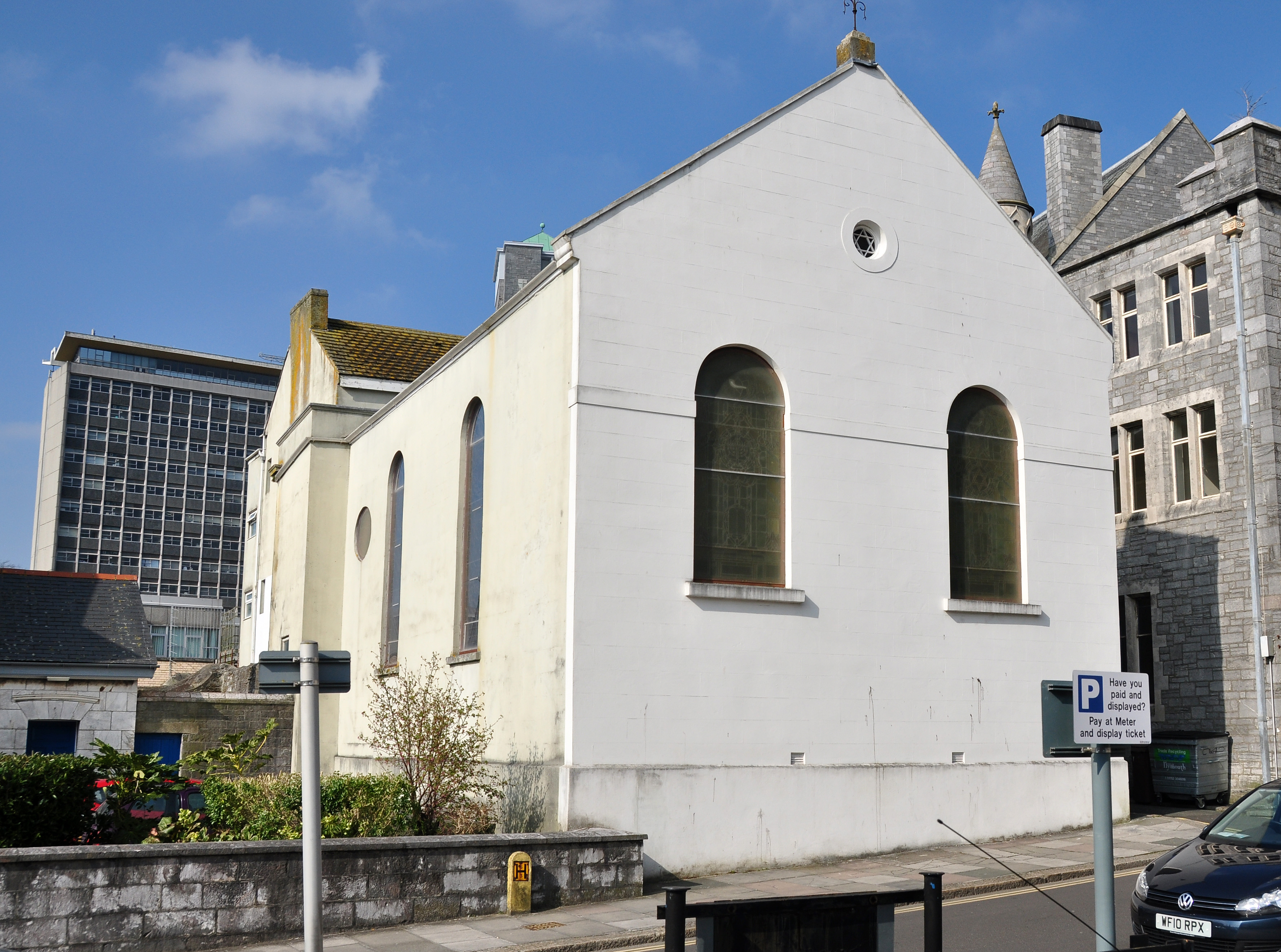
Plymouth Synagogue, England, the oldest synagogue built by Ashkenazi Jews in the English speaking world

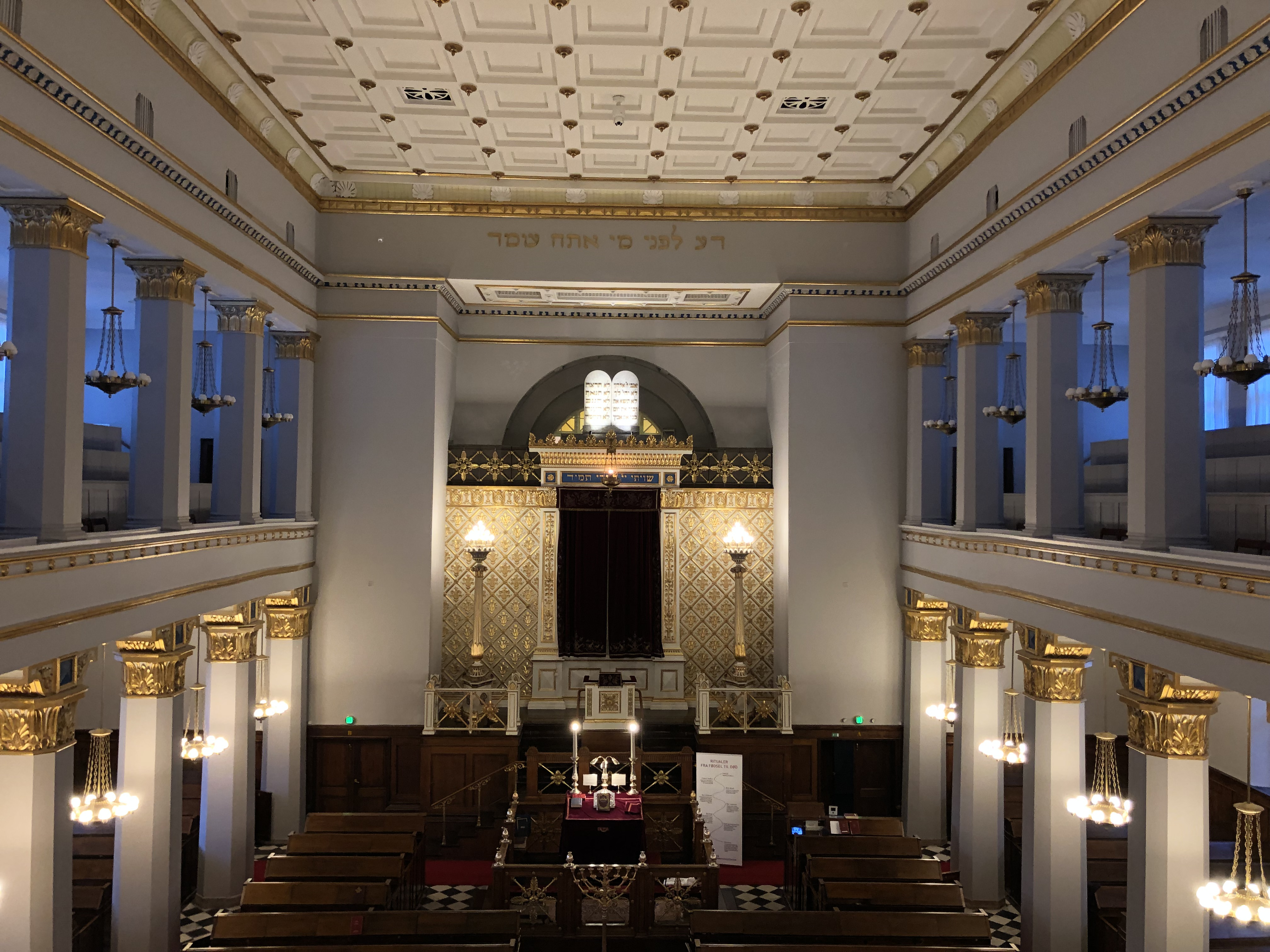
Interior of Great Synagogue (Copenhagen), Denmark

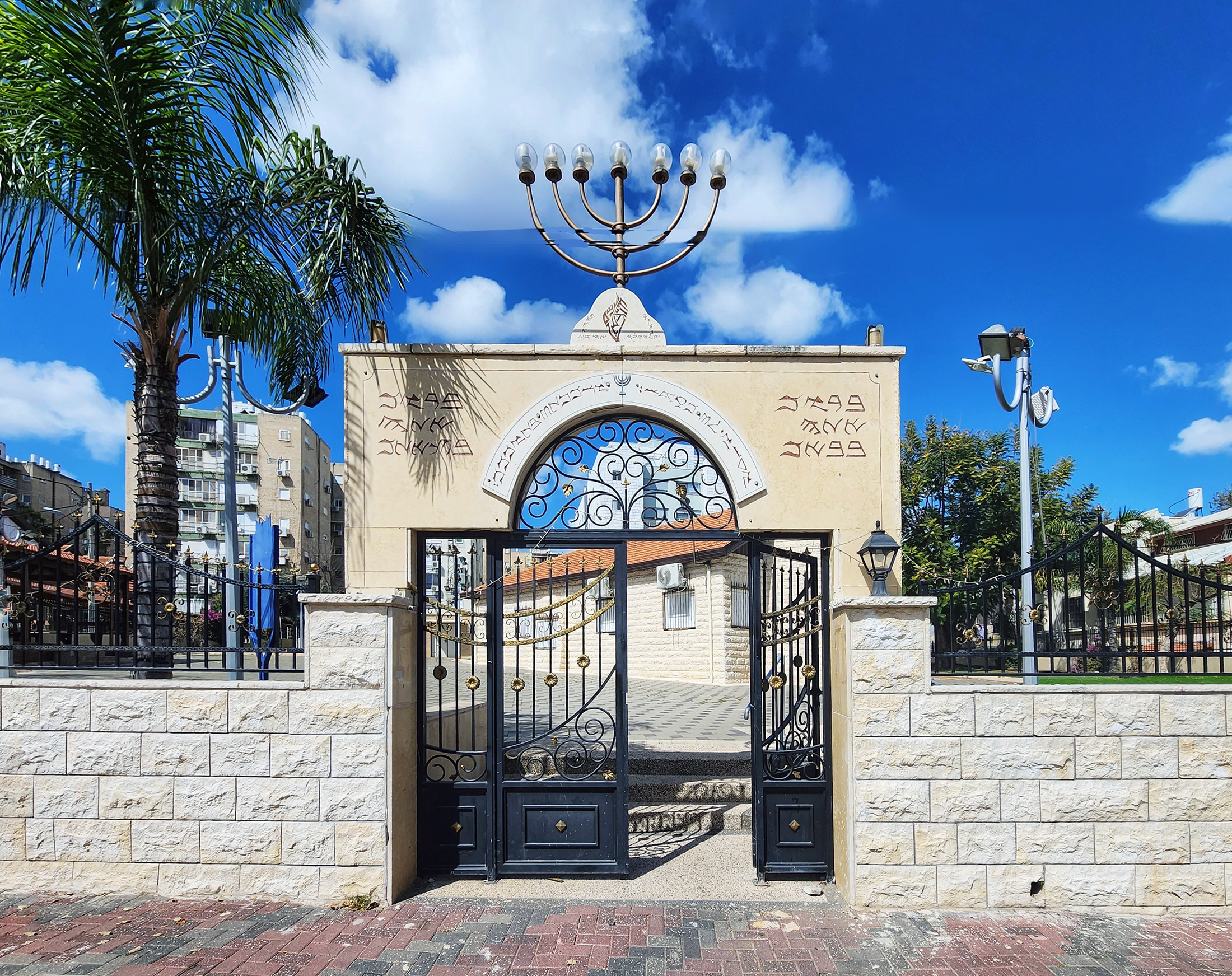
Samaritan synagogue in Neve Pinchas, Holon, Israel

== See also ==
- House of Yahweh (biblical term)
- Tabernacle
- Temple in Jerusalem
