= Magdala =

Ancient Hebrew city

- מגדלא (Jewish Palestinian Aramaic)
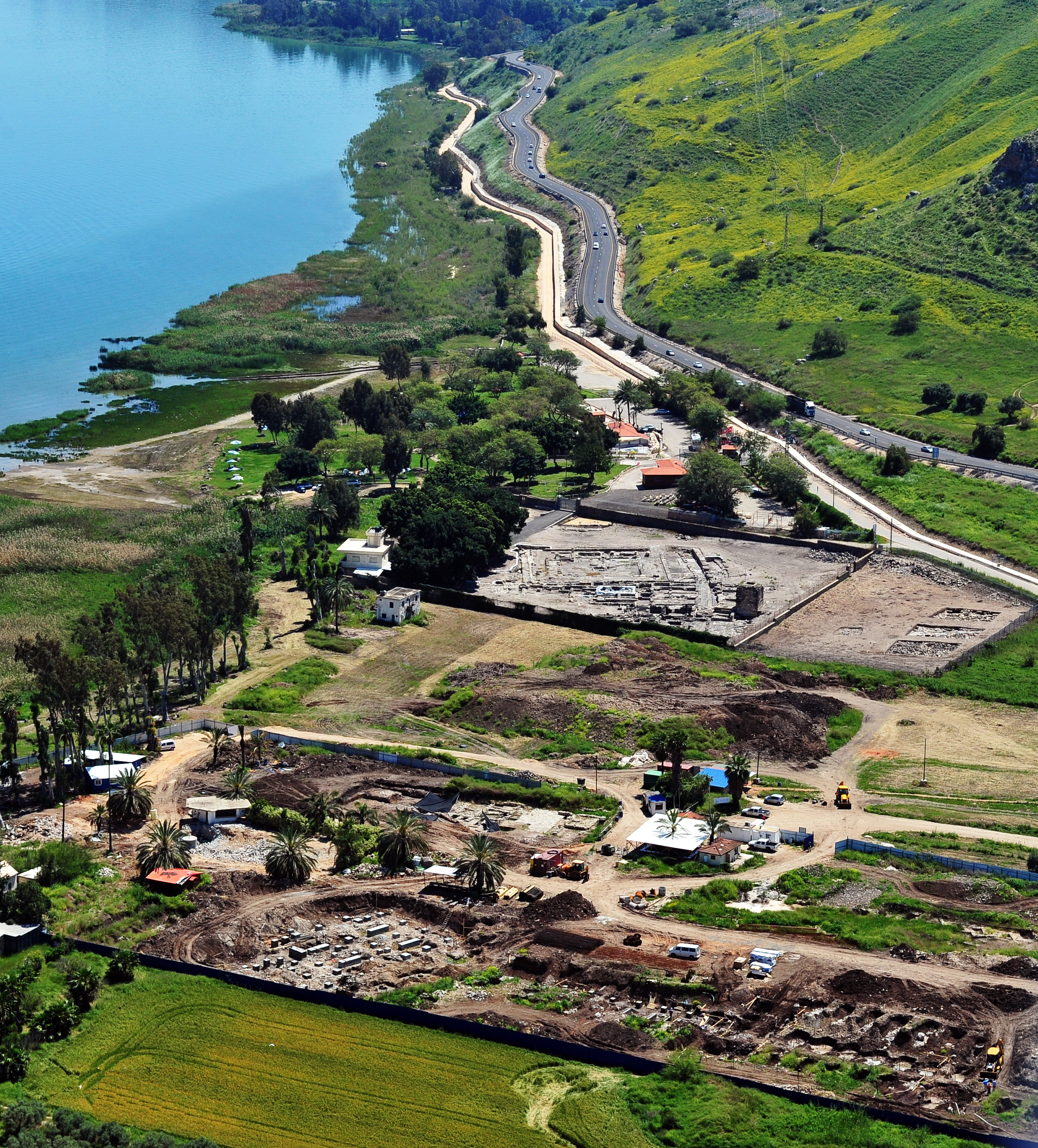
- Aerial view of the modern site of Magdala, looking south

- Location in Israel
- 32°49′30″N 35°30′56″E
- Location: Galilee, Israel
- Region: Levant

Magdala (Aramaic: מגדלא, romanized: Magdalā, lit. 'Tower'; Hebrew: מִגְדָּל, romanized: Migdál; Ancient Greek: Μαγδαλά, romanized: Magdalá) was an ancient Jewish city on the shore of the Sea of Galilee, 5 km (3 miles) north of Tiberias. In the Babylonian Talmud it is known as Magdala Nunayya (Aramaic: מגדלא נוניה, lit. 'Tower of the Fishes'), and which some historical geographers think may refer to Tarichaea (lit. 'the place of processing fish'). It is believed to be the birthplace of Mary Magdalene. Until the 1948 Arab–Israeli War, the Palestinian village of al-Majdal (Arabic: المجدل) stood at the site of ancient Magdala. The Israeli municipality of Migdal now extends into the area.

== History ==
=== Roman period ===
Archaeological excavations on behalf of the Israel Antiquities Authority (IAA) conducted in 2006 found that the settlement began during the Hellenistic period (between the second and first centuries BCE) and ended during the late Roman period (third century CE). Later excavations in 2009–2013 brought perhaps the most important discovery in the site: an ancient synagogue, called the "Migdal Synagogue", dating from the Second Temple period. It is the oldest synagogue found in the Galilee, and one of the few synagogues from that period found in the entire country, as of the time of the excavation. They also found the Magdala stone, which has a seven-branched menorah symbol carved on it. It is the earliest menorah of that period to be discovered outside Jerusalem.

Archaeologists discovered an entire first century Jewish town lying just below the surface. The excavation revealed multiple structures and four mikvaot (plural of mikvah or mikveh). In 2021, another synagogue from the same period was discovered at Magdala.

At Magdala, two texts from the first century were discovered. The initial finding is a Greek mosaic inscription embedded in tessera, displaying the word ΚΑΙΣΥ, translated as "(Welcome) also to you!". The second finding is a lead weight with Greek inscriptions from the 23rd year of Agrippa II, referencing two agoranomoi, enabling its dating to either 71/2 or 82/3 CE.

A collapse layer from the Second Temple period supports Josephus's narrative of the Roman destruction of Magdala during the First Jewish–Roman War. Excavations show that after the destruction, during the Byzantine and Early Islamic periods, the city moved slightly to the north.

"...it [Magdala] was the most important city on the western bank of the lake, contributing a wagon-load of taxes [...] until Herod Antipas raised up a rival on the lake by building Tiberias." --Gustaf Dalman

Magdala has been described as the "capital of a toparchy" and compared to Sepphoris and Tiberias in that it had "administrative apparatus and personnel" though not to the same extent.

==== Synagogues ====
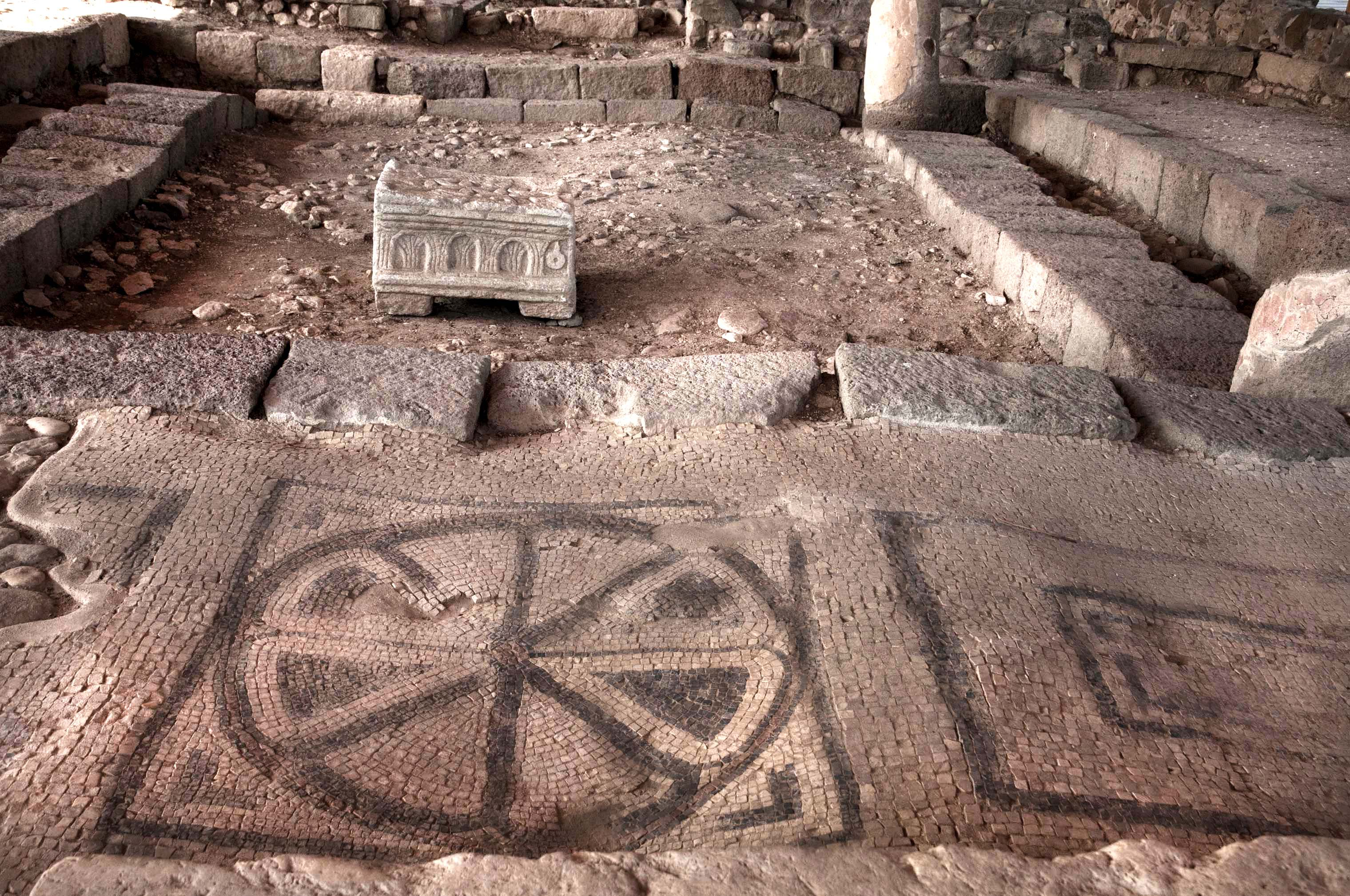
Inside the excavated synagogue

The remains of a Roman-period synagogue dated to 50 BCE- 100 CE were discovered in 2009. The walls of the 120-square-metre (1,300 sq ft) main hall were decorated with brightly colored frescoes and inside was a stone block carved with a seven-branched menorah.

The synagogue complex included separate spaces for public Torah reading, private study and scroll storage, as well as an exterior basin interpreted as serving ritual handwashing.

In December 2021, a second synagogue dating to the Second Temple period was unearthed at Magdala. It is the first time two synagogues from this period have been found in a single site. The second synagogue found was not as ornate as the first, and probably served the city's industrial zone.

The city was destroyed by the Romans during the First Jewish-Roman War.

=== Byzantine, Early Muslim, and Crusader periods ===
All four gospels refer to a follower of Jesus called Mary Magdalene, which is usually assumed to mean "Mary from Magdala", although there is no biblical information to indicate whether it was her birthplace or her home. Most Christian scholars assume that she was from Magdala Nunayy. (Note: Magdala Nunayy is possibly where Jesus landed on the occasion recorded in Matthew 15:39.) Recognition of Magdala as the birthplace of Mary Magdalene appears in texts dating back to the 6th century CE. In the 8th and 10th centuries CE, Christian sources write of a church in the village that was Mary Magdalene's house, where Jesus is said to have exorcised her of demons. The anonymously penned Life of Constantine attributes the building of the church to Empress Helena in the 4th century CE, at the location where she found Mary Magdalene's house. Christian pilgrims to Palestine in the 12th century mention the location of Magdala, but fail to mention the presence of any church at that time.

=== Mamluk period ===
Under the rule of the Mamluks in the 13th century, sources indicate that the church was used as a stable. In 1283, Burchard of Mount Sion records having entered the house of Mary Magdalene in the village, and about ten years later, Ricoldus of Montecroce noted his joy at having found the church and house still standing.

al-Majdal المجدل Majdal, Magdala
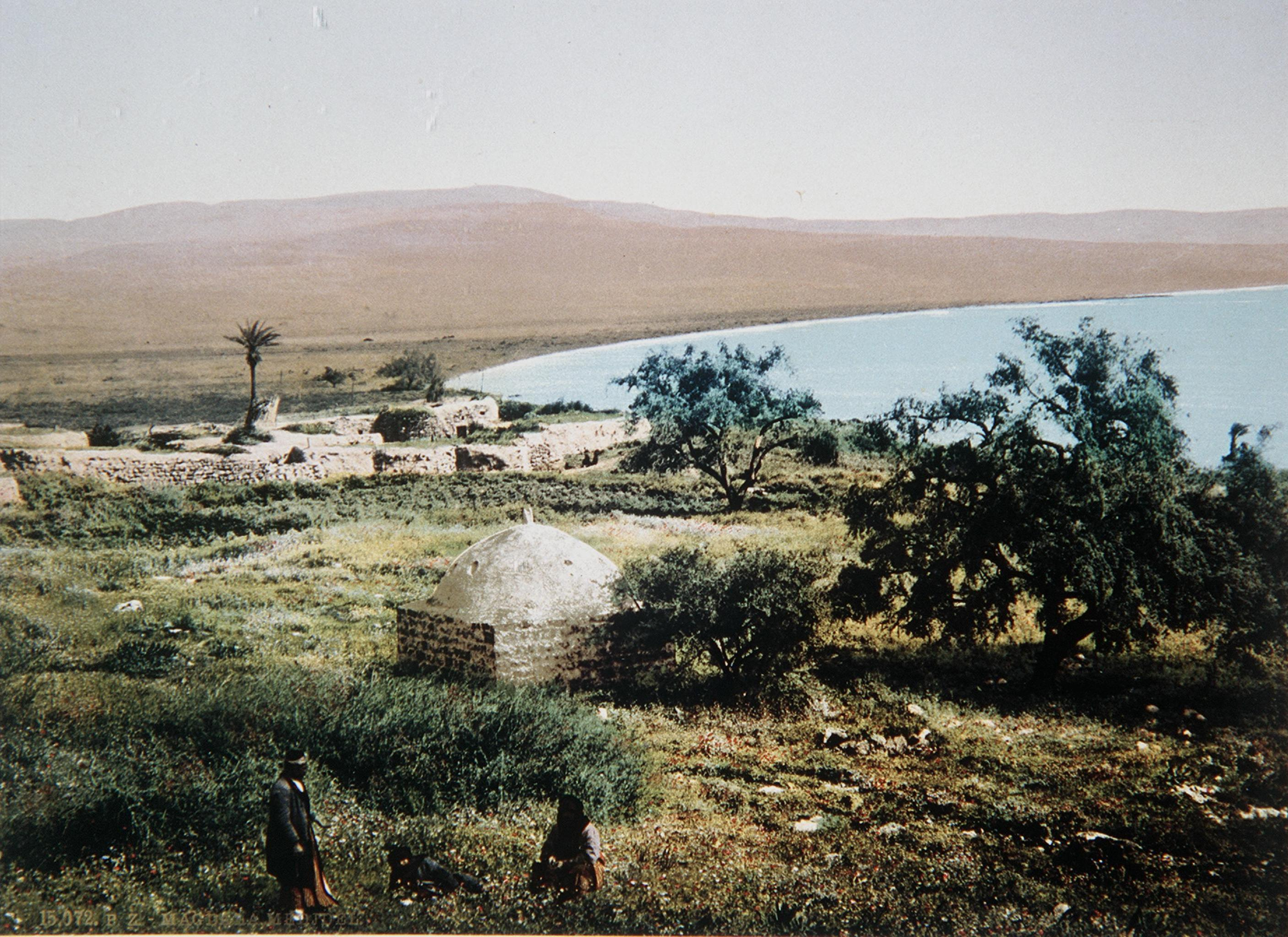
- al-Majdal, sea of Galilee by Bonfils. Shrine of Muhammad al-'Ajami in the foreground.

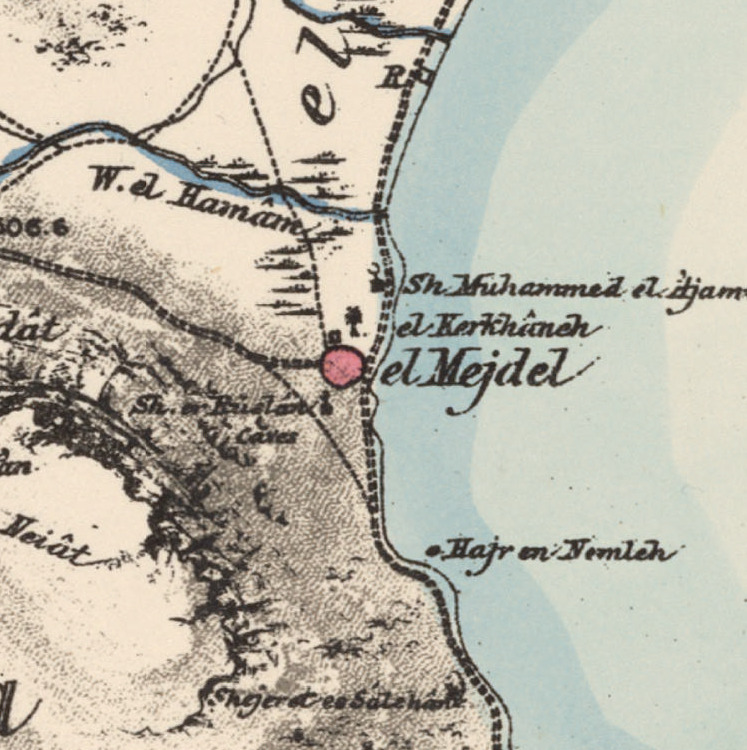
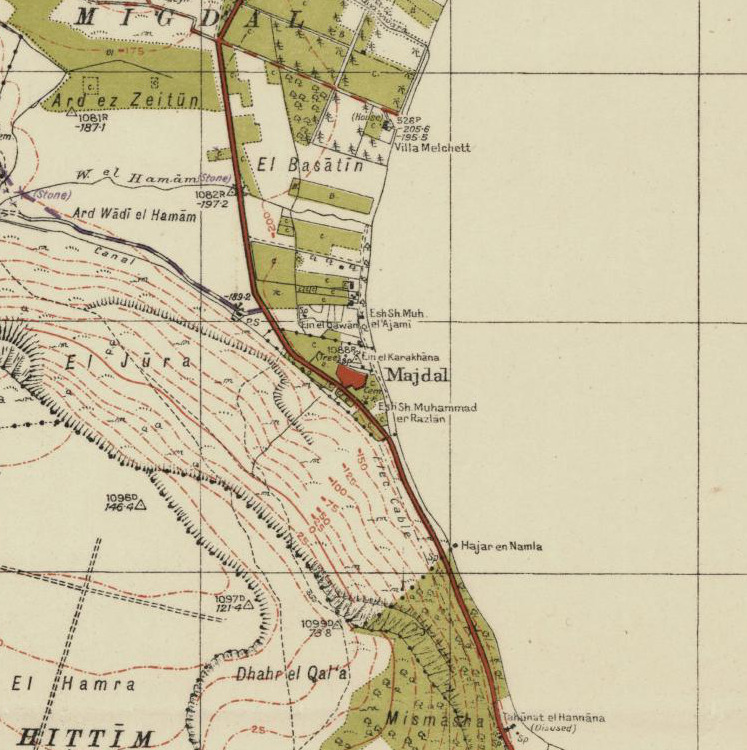
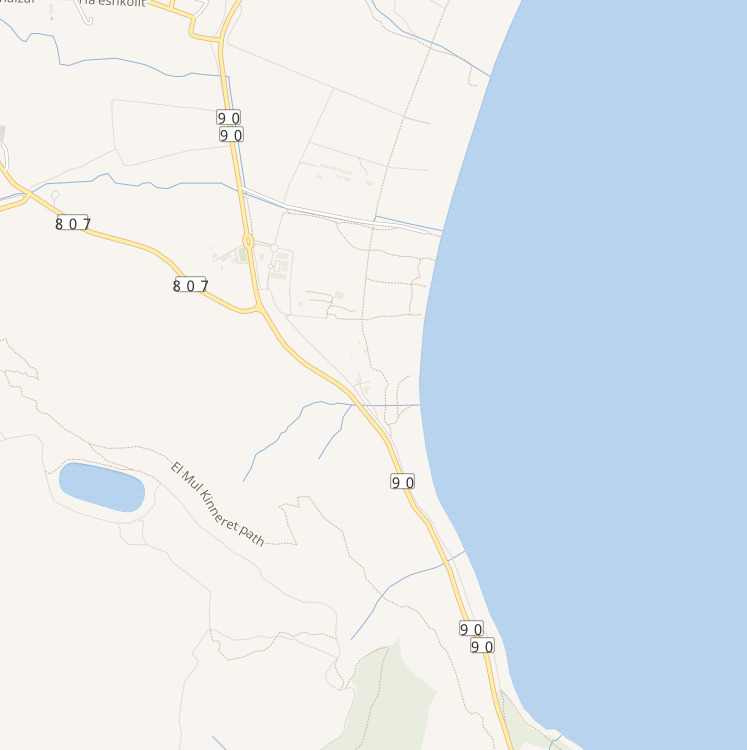
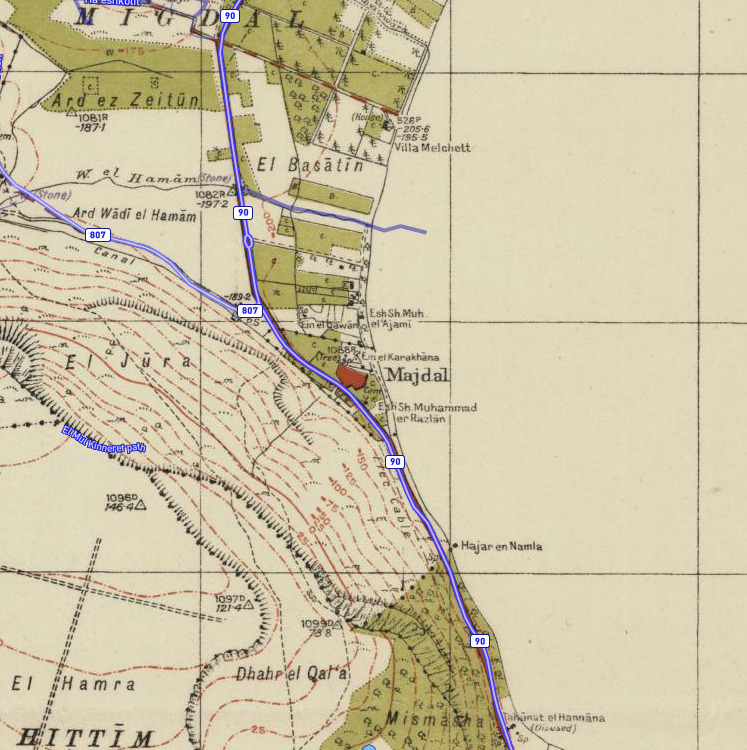
- 1870s map 1940s map modern map 1940s with modern overlay map A series of historical maps of the area around Al-Majdal, Tiberias (click the buttons)

- Location within Mandatory Palestine
- Palestine grid: 198/247
- Geopolitical entity: Mandatory Palestine
- Subdistrict: Tiberias
- Date of depopulation: 22 April 1948

Area
  - Total: 103 dunams (10.3 ha; 25 acres)

Population (1945)
  - Total: 360
- Cause(s) of depopulation: Military assault by Yishuv forces
- Secondary cause: Influence of nearby town's fall
- Current Localities: Migdal, Israel

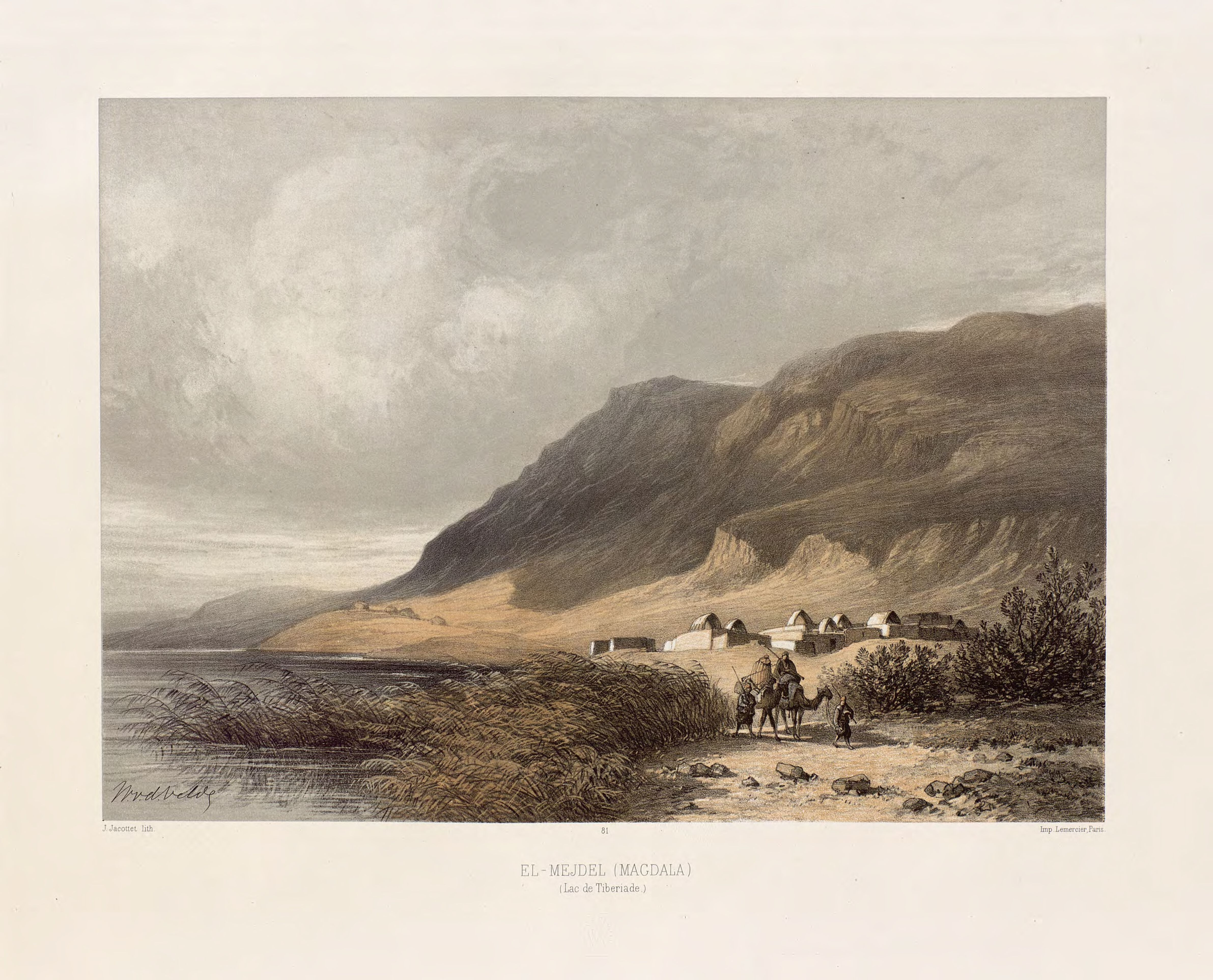
Al-Majdal, ca 1851, by van de Velde

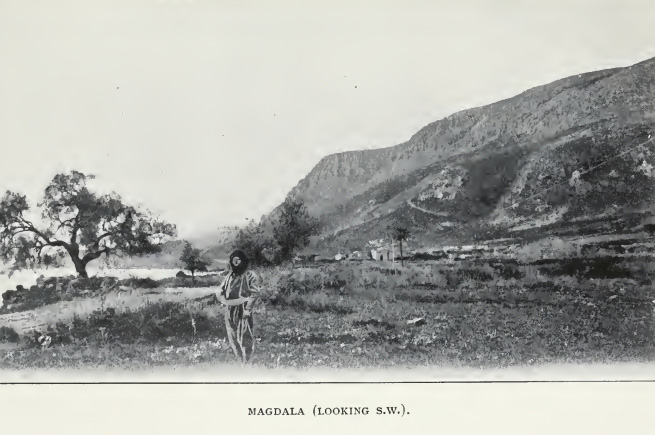
A view of Al-Majdal in 1903 when looking toward the southwest

Al-Majdal (Arabic: المجدل, "tower", also transliterated Majdal, Majdil and Mejdel) was a Palestinian Arab village, located on the western shore of the Sea of Galilee (200 meters or 660 feet below sea level; 32°49′28″N 35°31′00″E), 5 km (3 miles) north of Tiberias and south of Khan Minyeh.

Christian pilgrims wrote of visiting the house and church of Mary Magdalene from the 6th century onward, but little is known about the village in the Mamluk and early Ottoman period, indicating it was likely small or uninhabited. In the 19th century, Western travellers generally describing it as a very small and poor Muslim village.

=== Ottoman era ===
Francesco Quaresmi writes of al-Majdal in 1626 that "certain people have claimed that her house is to be seen there", but that the site was in ruins.

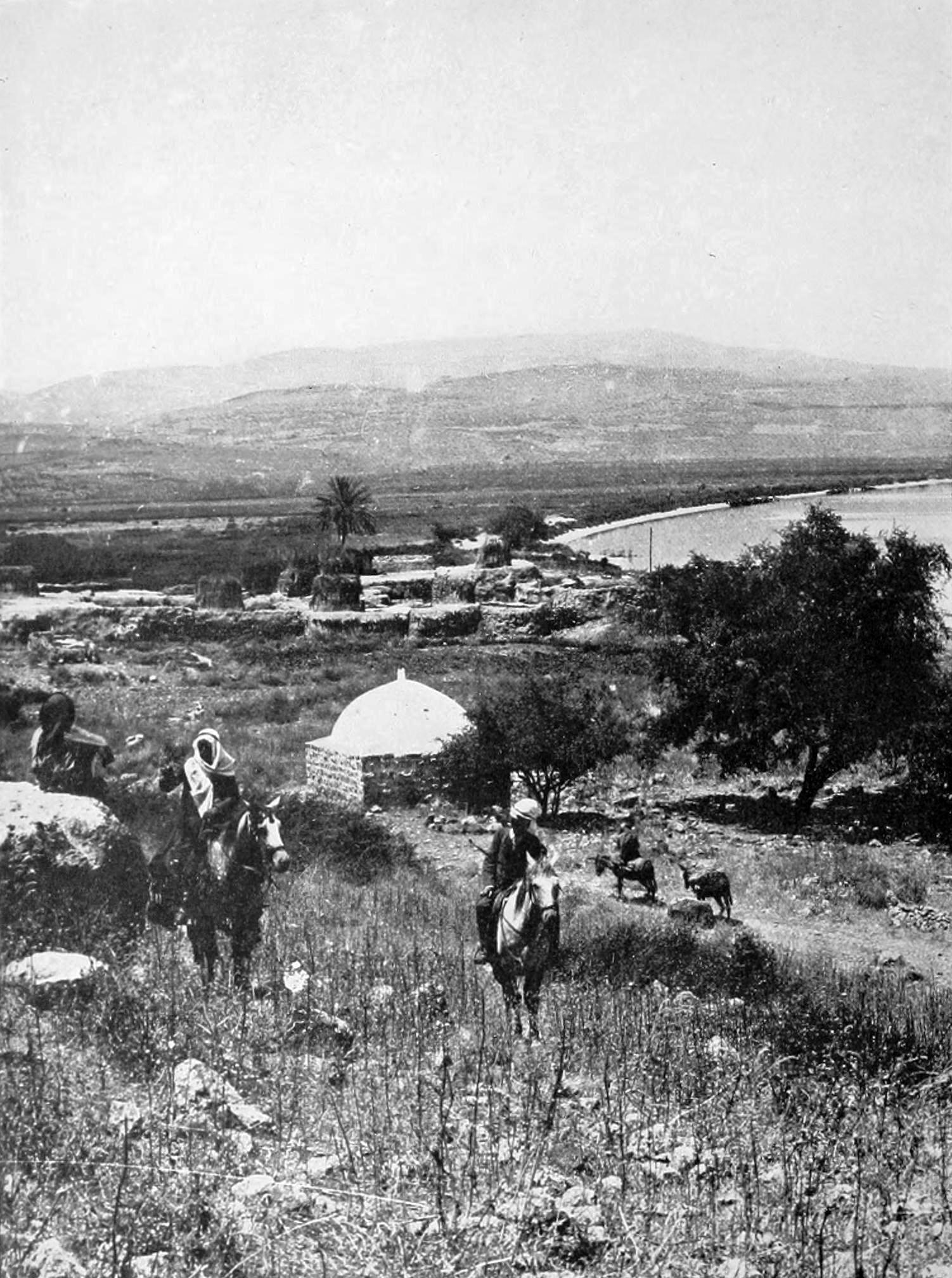
Al-Majdal in 1909

The small Muslim Arab village of Al-Majdal was located to the south of the land acquired by the Franciscans. Little is known about the village in the medieval or early Ottoman period, presumably because it was either small or uninhabited. Richard Pococke visited "Magdol" around 1740, where he noted "the considerable remains of an indifferent castle", which in his opinion was not the biblical Magdala. The village appeared as El Megdel on the 1799 map of Pierre Jacotin. In the early 19th century, foreign travellers interested in the Christian traditions associated with the site visited the village. In 1807 U. Seetzen stayed overnight in "the little Mahommedan village of Majdil, situated on the bank of the lake." The English traveler James Silk Buckingham observed in 1816 that a few Muslim families resided there, and in 1821, the Swiss traveler Johann Ludwig Burckhardt noted that the village was in a rather poor condition.

During his travels through Syria and Palestine in 1838, Edward Robinson described el-Mejdel, as he called it, "a miserable little Muslim village, looking much like a ruin, though exhibiting no marks of antiquity." He wrote: "The name Mejdel is obviously the same with the Hebrew Migdal and Greek Magdala; there is little reason to doubt that this place is the Magdala of the New Testament, chiefly known as the native town of Mary Magdalene. The ancient notices respecting its position are exceedingly indefinite; yet it seems to follow from the New Testament itself, that it lay on the west side of the lake. After the miraculous feeding of four thousand, which appears to have taken place in the country east of the lake, Jesus 'took ship and came into the coast of Magdala;' for which Mark the Evangelist writes Dalmanutha. Here, the Pharisees began to question him, but he 'left them, and entering into the ship again, departed to the other side [...] This view is further confirmed by the testimony of the Rabbins in the Jerusalem Talmud, compiled at Tiberias; who several times speak of Magdala as adjacent to Tiberias and Hammath or the hot springs. The Migdal-el of the Old Testament in the tribe of Naphtali was probably the same place."

In his account of an expedition to the Jordan River and the Dead Sea in 1849, William Francis Lynch reports that it was "a poor village of about 40 families, all fellahin," living in houses of stone with mud roofs, similar to those in Tur'an. Arriving by boat a few years later, Bayard Taylor describes the view from path winding up from shoreline, "[...] through oleanders, nebbuks, patches of hollyhock, anise-seed, fennel, and other spicy plants, while on the west, great fields of barley stand ripe for the cutting. In some places, the Fellahs, men and women, were at work, reaping and binding the sheaves."

In 1857, Solomon Caesar Malan wrote: "Each house, whether separate or attached to another, consisted of one room only. The walls built of mud and of stones, were about ten or twelve feet high; and perhaps as many or more feet square. The roof which was flat, consisted of trunks of trees placed across from one wall to another, and then covered with small branches, grass and rushes; over which a thick coating of mud and gravel was laid. ... A flight of rude steps against the wall outside leads up to the roof; and thus enables those who will to reach it without entering the house."

There were two shrines in Al-Majdal: the maqam of Sheikh Muhammad al-'Ajami to the north of the village and the maqam of Sheikh Muhammad ar-Raslan (or ar-Ruslan) south of the village, as shown on PEF maps and British maps of the 1940s. The first shrine is mentioned by Victor Guérin in 1863. He writes that he arrived in the village from the north: "At seven twenty minutes I crossed the fifth important stream, called Wadi al-Hammam. Behind him is a wely dedicated to the saint Sidi al-Adjemy. At seven o'clock twenty-five minutes I reach Mejdel, a village which I pass without stopping, having already visited it enough".

Isabel Burton also mentions the shrine for Muhammad al-'Ajami in her private journals published in 1875: "First we came to Magdala (Mejdel) ... There is a tomb here of a Shaykh (El Ajami), the name implies a Persian Santon; there is a tomb seen on a mountain, said to be that of Dinah, Jacob's daughter. Small boys were running in Nature's garb on the beach, which is white, sandy, pebbly, and full of small shells."

In 1881 the PEF's Survey of Western Palestine described al-Majdal as a stone-built village, situated on a partially arable plain, with an estimated population of about 80. Fellahin from Egypt are said to have settled in the village some time in the 19th century.

A population list from about 1887 showed el Mejdel to have about 170 inhabitants; all Muslims.

The Jewish agricultural settlement of Migdal was established in 1910–1911 on land purchased by Russian Zionists Jews, 1.5 kilometers (0.93 mi) northwest of the village of Al-Majdal.

=== British Mandate era ===
Bellarmino Bagatti and another Franciscan friar who visited the village in 1935 were hosted by the Mukhtar Mutlaq, whose nine wives and descendants are said to have made up almost the whole of the population of the village at the time. Part of the site was acquired by the Franciscan Custody of the Holy Land sometime after 1935. During this period, Al-Majdal had a rectangular layout, with most of the houses crowded together, though a few to the north along the lakeshore were spaced further apart. Built of stone, cement, and mud, some had roofs of wood and cane covered with a layer of mud. It was the smallest village in the district of Tiberias in terms of land area. The Muslim inhabitants maintained a shrine for one Mohammad al-Ajami on the northern outskirts of the village. To the west of the village on the summit of the mountains, lay the remains of the Crusader fortress of Magdala (later known as Qal'at Na'la ("the fortress of Na'la"). On the lakeshore about 1 kilometer (0.62 mi) south of the village, was a perforated black stone mentioned by Arab travellers in the late 17th and early 18th centuries. Local belief held that the holes were caused by ants having eaten through it, and for this reason it was called hajar al-namla, "the ant´s stone."

At the time of the 1922 census of Palestine, Majdal had a population of 210 Muslims, increasing to 284 Muslims living in 62 houses by the 1931 census. The village economy was based on agriculture, vegetables and grain.

In the 1945 statistics Al-Majdal had a population of 360 Muslims with a total land area of 103 dunams. Of this, 24 dunams were used for growing citrus and bananas, and 41 dunums devoted to cereals. Another 17 dunams were irrigated or used for orchards, while 6 dunams were classified as built-up (urban) area.

=== 1948 War ===
During the 1947–1948 civil war in Mandatory Palestine, after the Arab quarter of Tiberias was taken by Jewish forces and its inhabitants were evacuated, the Arab villages surrounding it were also depopulated, including Al-Majdal. Benny Morris writes that the inhabitants were persuaded by the headmen of [neighbouring Jewish] Migdal and Kibbutz Ginosar to evacuate their homes; the villagers were paid P£200 for eight rifles, ammunition and a bus they handed over. They were then transported to the Jordanian border by bus. Al-Majdal was subsequently bulldozed by the Israelis in 1948.

=== Migdal ===
In 1910–1911, the Jewish village of Migdal was established adjacent to Al-Majdal. After 1948, Migdal expanded to include some of the village land of Al-Majdal.

=== State of Israel ===
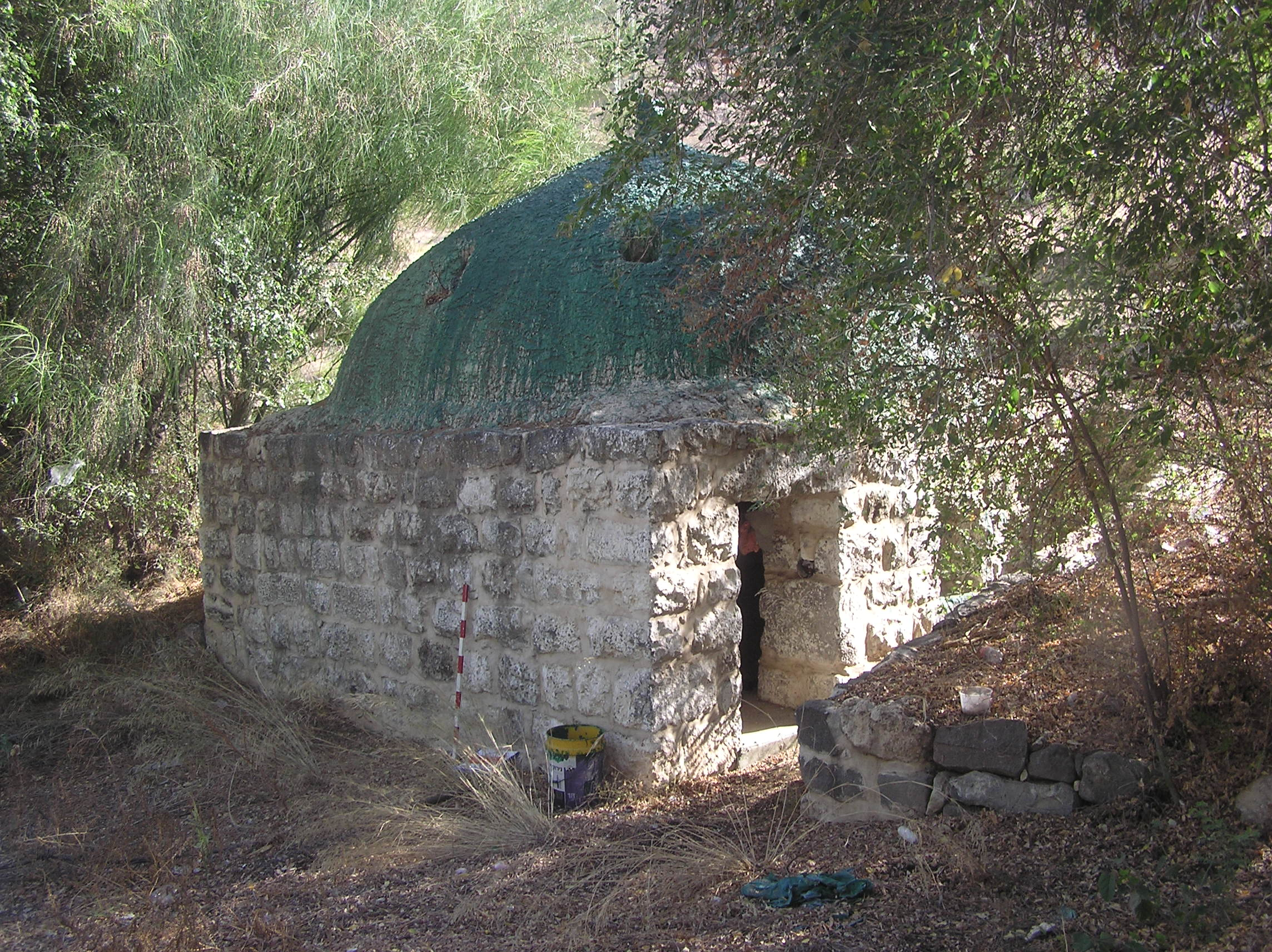
Maqam of Muhammad al-'Ajami, 2015

Walid Khalidi describes the village remains in 1992: "The site is dotted with rubble, Christ's-thorn, and a few palm and olive trees. The only remaining village landmark is the neglected shrine of Muhammad al-'Ajami, a low, square, stone structure topped by a formerly whitewashed dome. The land in the vicinity is cultivated by Israelis." In 1991, Petersen visited the maqam of Muhammad al-Ajami, describing it as a small square building with a shallow dome supported by squinches. The entrance was on the north side, where there also was a small window. The shrine appeared to contain two tombs, one about 1 meter (3.3 ft) high, while the other marked only by a low kerb of stones. The larger tomb was covered with purple and green cloth.

Visiting in the 1980s and 1990s, Jane Schaberg reports that the site was marked by a sign that says: "This was the birthplace of Mary Magdelene, a city that flourished toward the end of the Second Temple period and one of the cities fortified by Joseph ben Matityahu (Josephus) during the great revolt of the Jews against the Romans." The site contained an Islamic domed structure and an old stone house surrounded by a stone wall topped with barbed wire. Weeds had grown over the site where excavations were carried out in the 1970s but had been suspended due to water seepage from underground springs. An Arab family living in a nearby shack served as caretakers for the portion of the site owned by the Franciscans. Another small plot of land was owned by the Greek Orthodox Church, while the Jewish National Fund (JNF) owned the remainder.

== Etymology ==
The Arabic name Majdal means "tower" and preserves the ancient place name Magdala. Magdala was also known in ancient times as Migdal (Hebrew, also meaning tower), and the Aramaic names ascribed to it are either Magdala Nunaya (also, Migdal Nunnaya or Nunayah; "Tower of Fish") or Magdala Tza'baya (also Migdal Seb'iya; "Magdala of the Dyers" or "Tower of Dyers"), although some think these to be the same identification. Whether they are one and the same place has yet to be determined, as both Aramaic names appear in the Babylonian Talmud (Pesahim 46a) and Jerusalem Talmud (Ta'anit 4:8) respectively. Others ascribe the name of the site to the Greek Magdala Taricheae ("Magdala of the Fish Salters"), likely due to the town's famed fish-curing industry. The identification of Magdala with Taricheae, however, remains inconclusive. Archaeologist, Mordechai Aviam, who (like W.F. Albright) held that Tarichaea was to be recognised in the name Migdal (Magdala), admits that during the large archaeological excavations conducted at the site, no remains of fortifications or a destruction layer were found.

Mary Magdalene's surname as transcribed in the gospels is said to be derived from Magdala as her home and place of birth. Alfred Edersheim cites the Talmud as evidence for this naming practice, which describes several Rabbis as 'Magdalene' or residents of Magdala.

Majdal and Majdalani ("of Majdal") are common place names and family names in the Syria-Palestine region. Examples of such place names include Al-Majdal, Askalan, Majdal Yaba, and Al-Mujaydil (depopulated Palestinian villages located in modern-day Israel), Majdal Shams (a Syrian-Druze village in the Golan Heights), Majdal Bani Fadil (in the West Bank) and Majdal Anjar (in modern-day Lebanon).

== Identification ==
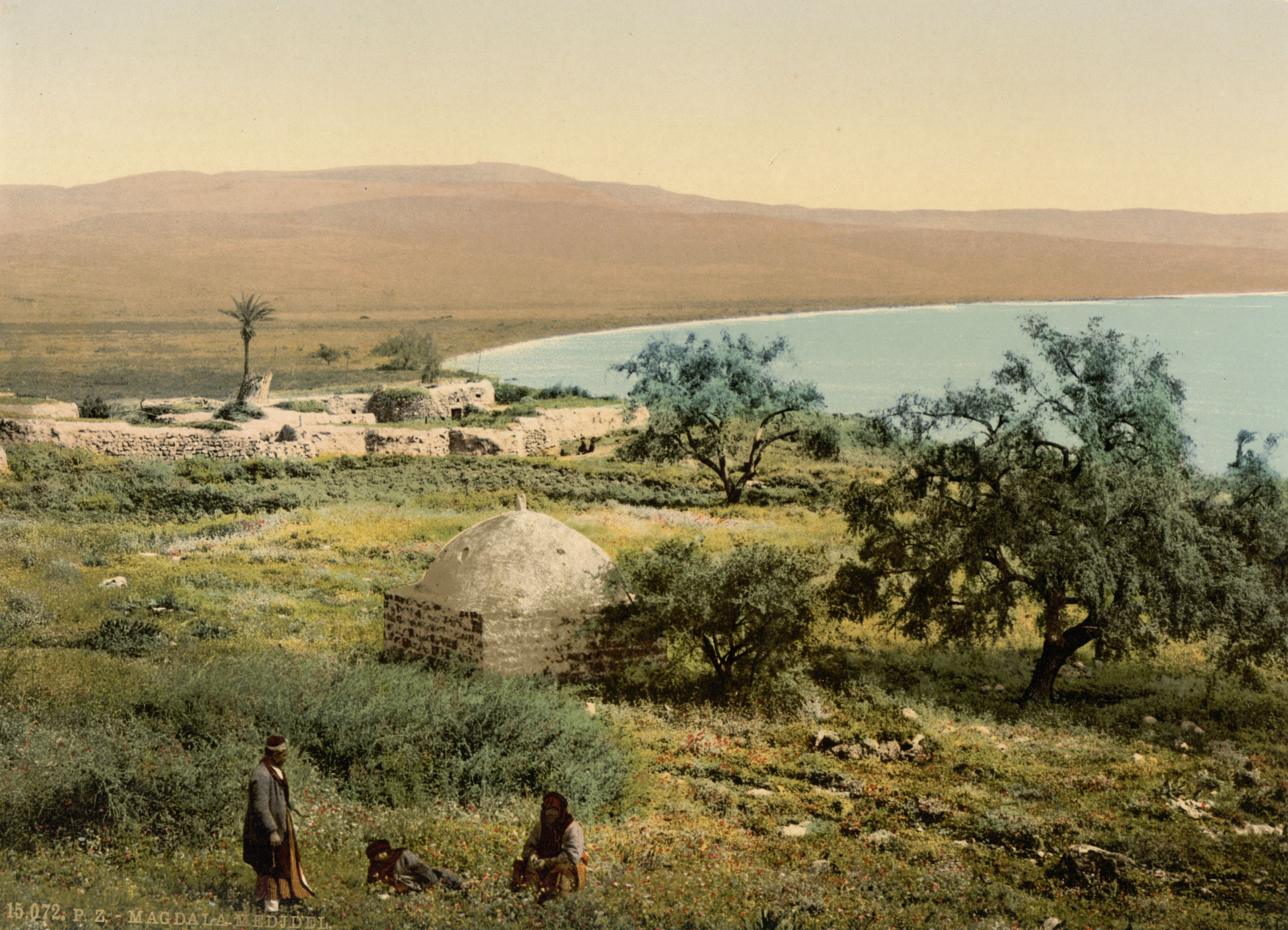
Photograph taken c. 1900, showing the shrine of Muhammad al-'Ajami, belonging to the Arab Palestinian village of Al-Majdal, and ruins of Magdala.

Magdala's reference in Matthew 15: 39 is, in some editions, given as "Magadan"; and in Mark 8:10 it is "Dalmanutha".

In 2014, Joan Taylor argued against the identification of al-Majdal with either Magdala or Tarichaea, and questioned the association with Mary Magdelene. Taylor and Schrader assert the name Magdalene means "Tower" and could have been a nicknmae given to her by Jesus.

=== Matthew's "Magdala" or "Magadan" ===
The New Testament makes one disputable mention of a place called Magdala. Matthew 15:39 of the King James Version reads, "And he sent away the multitude, and took ship, and came into the coasts of Magdala". However, some Greek manuscripts give the name of the place as "Magadan", and more recent translations (such as the Revised Version) follow this (Matthew 15:39). Although some commentators state confidently that the two refer to the same place, others dismiss the substitution of Magdala for Magadan as simply "to substitute a known for an unknown place".

=== Mark's "Dalmanutha" ===
The parallel passage in Mark's gospel (Mark 8:10) gives (in the majority of manuscripts) a quite different place name, Dalmanutha, although a handful of manuscripts give either Magdala or Magadan, presumably by assimilation to the Matthean text—believed in ancient times to be older than that of Mark, though this opinion has now been reversed.

=== The Talmud's two Magdalas ===
The Jewish Talmud distinguishes between two Magdalas:

- Magdala Gadar—One Magdala was in the east, on the River Yarmouk near Gadara (in the Middle Ages "Jadar", now Umm Qais), thus acquiring the name Magdala Gadar.
- Magdala Nunayya—There was another, better-known Magdala near Tiberias, Magdala Nunayya ("Magdala of the fishes"), which would locate it on the shore of the Sea of Galilee. Al-Majdal, a Palestinian Arab village depopulated in the lead up to the 1948 Arab-Israeli war, was identified as the site of this Magdala. The modern Israeli municipality of Migdal, founded in 1910 and about 6 km (3.7 miles) north-northwest of Tiberias, has expanded into the area of the former village.

=== Josephus's "Tarichaea" ===
Some researchers think that Josephus refers to Magdala Nunayya by the Greek name Tarichaea (Ant. 14.20; 20. 159; J.W. 1. 180; 2. 252), derived from the Greek Τάριχος or tarichos, meaning 'fish preserved by salting or drying', although the matter remains disputed.

Josephus is the primary source for Taricheae H.H. Kitchener of the Palestine Exploration Fund suggested that Taricheae was to be identified with the nearby ruin, Khurbet Kuneitriah, between Tiberias and Migdal. Others identify Taricheae with Kerek. The Magadan mentioned in Matthew 15:39 and the Dalmanutha of Mark 8:10 are likely corrupt forms of Magdal (Magdala) and Magdal Nuna (Magdala Nunaya).

== Excavations ==
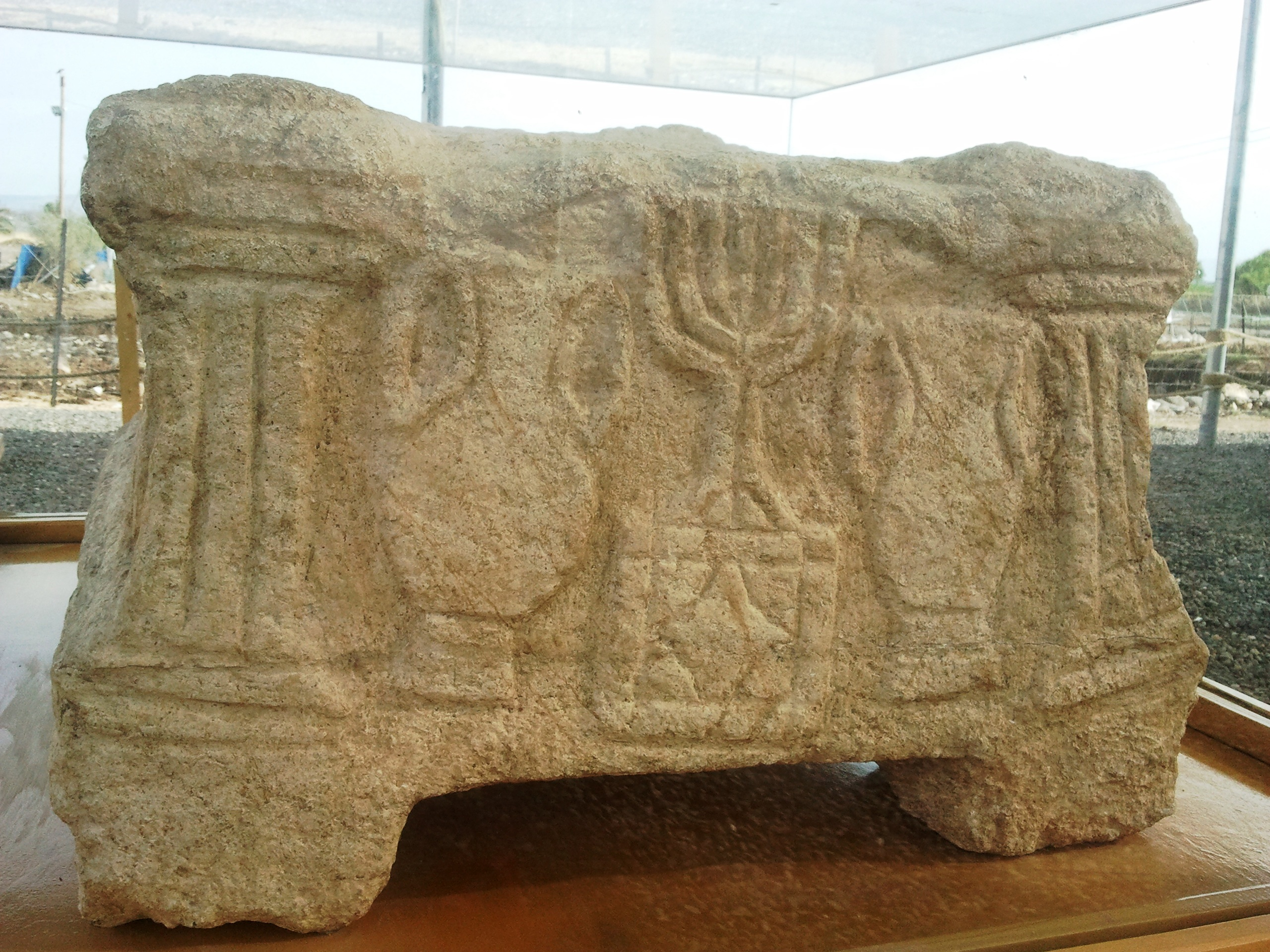
Stone with Menorah that was found in the Archaeological site inside the Synagogue area

At the beginning of the 20th century, R. Lendle, a German architect purchased some land from the Arab villagers to carry out excavations, but no reports were made of the findings. The remains of a church with an apse and a stone inscribed with a cross and the date 1389 were found near Birqat Sitti Miriam (Arabic: "The Pool of Our Lady Mary") on the Franciscan-owned grounds.

Between 1971 and 1977 Magdala was partially excavated by Virgilio Canio Corbo and Stanislao Loffreda of the Studium Biblicum Franciscanum in Jerusalem. However, their reports are in Italian and attracted little notice. Between 1971 and 1976, excavations also discovered the remains of what is thought to have been a Byzantine era monastery near the sea. The excavations were hindered by the water from underground springs, as well as the destruction wrought by the bulldozing of the Arab village which pushed many ancient artifacts towards the sea. The mosaic of the Byzantine monastery was badly damaged, though part of the geometric and cross design of red, white, blue and ash-coloured stones could still be seen. A Roman era paved road dating to the 1st century CE was also uncovered and identified. To the east of it, a building encompassing 60 meters (200 ft) of closed space was revealed that is thought to be either a 1st-century CE mini-synagogue or nymphaeum. Other findings include a tower, aqueduct, and large paved court enclosed by colonnades to the south, and to the north, a large urban villa. The villa was in use between the 1st century CE and the Byzantine era; a Greek inscription at the doorstep reading kai su ("and you" or "you too") is the only one of its kind to be found in Israel, though similar inscriptions have been found in private homes excavated in Antioch.

Other artifacts discovered in the excavations of the 1970s include a needle and lead weights for repairing and holding down fishing nets, and numerous coins. Many of the coins dated to the time of the first Jewish revolt against Rome (66 - 70 CE), four to the 3rd century CE, and in the top layer, one dated to the time of Constantine. Another cache of coins found there contained 74 from Tyre, 15 from Ptolemais, 17 from Gadara, 14 from Scythopolis, 10 from Tiberias, 9 from Hippos, 8 from Sepphoris and 2 from Gaba.

In 1991, during a period of severe drought, the waters of the Sea of Galilee receded and the remains of a tower with a base made of basalt pillars was revealed about 150 feet (46 m) from the shoreline. Archaeologists believe it served as a lighthouse for fishermen. It has since been submerged by the waters once again.

Excavations begun at Magdala during 2007-8 were called The Magdala Project. Salvage excavations at Magdala are being conducted under the auspices of The Zinman Institute of Archaeology at the University of Haifa. As of 2021, the dig is contracted to Y.G. Contractual Archeology Ltd.

== Bibliography ==
- Bauckham, Richard (2018). Magdala of Galilee: A Jewish City in the Hellenistic and Roman Period. Baylor University Press. ISBN 978-1-4813-0293-7.
- Barron, J.B., ed. (1923). Palestine: Report and General Abstracts of the Census of 1922. Government of Palestine.
- Buckingham, J.S. (1821). Travels in Palestine through the countries of Bashan and Gilead, east of the River Jordan, including a visit to the cities of Geraza and Gamala in the Decapolis. London: Longman, Hurst, Rees, Orme and Brown.
- Burckhardt, J.L. (1822). Travels in Syria and the Holy Land. J. Murray.
- Burton, I. (1875). The inner life of Syria, Palestine, and the Holy Land: from my private journal. Vol. 2. C. Kegan Paul.
- Conder, C.R.; Kitchener, H.H. (1881). The Survey of Western Palestine: Memoirs of the Topography, Orography, Hydrography, and Archaeology. Vol. 1. London: Committee of the Palestine Exploration Fund.
- Department of Statistics (1945). Village Statistics, April, 1945. Government of Palestine.
- Green, J.B.; McKnight, S.; Marshall, I.H. (1992). Dictionary of Jesus and the Gospels. InterVarsity Press. ISBN 978-0-8308-1777-1.
- Guérin, V. (1880). Description Géographique Historique et Archéologique de la Palestine (in French). Vol. 3: Galilee, pt. 1. Paris: L'Imprimerie Nationale.
- Hadawi, S. (1970). Village Statistics of 1945: A Classification of Land and Area ownership in Palestine. Palestine Liberation Organization Research Center. Archived from the original on 8 December 2018.
- Hastings, James (2004). A Dictionary of Christ and the Gospels: Volume II (Part One -- Labour - Profession). The Minerva Group, Inc. ISBN 978-1-4102-1787-5.
- Herzl Press (1971). Encyclopedia of Zionism and Israel. Vol. II. New York: McGraw-Hill.
- Israel. Agaf ha-ʻatiḳot ṿeha-muzeʼonim, Ḥevrah la-ḥaḳirat Erets-Yiśraʾel ṿe-ʻatiḳoteha, Universiṭah ha-ʻIvrit bi-Yerushalayim. Makhon le-arkheʾologyah (1979). Israel exploration journal. Israel Exploration Society.
- Karmon, Y. (1960). "An Analysis of Jacotin's Map of Palestine" (PDF). Israel Exploration Journal. 10 (3, 4): 155–173, 244–253. Archived from the original (PDF) on 22 December 2019.
- Khalidi, W. (1992). All That Remains: The Palestinian Villages Occupied and Depopulated by Israel in 1948. Washington D.C.: Institute for Palestine Studies. ISBN 0-88728-224-5.
- Kregel Carta (1999). The River Jordan: An Illustrated Guide from Bible Days to the Present (Illustrated ed.). Kregel Publications. ISBN 978-0-8254-2376-5.
- Lynch, W.F. (1849). Narrative of the United States' Expedition to the River Jordan and the Dead Sea. London: Richard Bentley.
- MacAdam, Henry Innes (1986). Studies in the history of the Roman province of Arabia: the northern sector. Vol. 295–296 (Illustrated ed.). Biblical Archaeology Review.
- Malan, S.C. (1857). Magdala: A Day by the Sea of Galilee. London: J. Masters.
- Mills, E., ed. (1932). Census of Palestine 1931. Population of Villages, Towns and Administrative Areas. Jerusalem: Government of Palestine.
- Morris, B. (2004). The Birth of the Palestinian Refugee Problem Revisited. Cambridge University Press. ISBN 978-0-521-00967-6.
- Murphy-O'Connor, J. (2008). The Holy Land: an Oxford archaeological guide from earliest times to 1700 (5th, illustrated ed.). Oxford University Press US. ISBN 978-0-19-923666-4.
- Palmer, E.H. (1881). The Survey of Western Palestine: Arabic and English Name Lists Collected During the Survey by Lieutenants Conder and Kitchener, R. E. Transliterated and Explained by E.H. Palmer. Committee of the Palestine Exploration Fund.
- Petersen, Andrew (2001). A Gazetteer of Buildings in Muslim Palestine (British Academy Monographs in Archaeology). Vol. 1. Oxford University Press. ISBN 978-0-19-727011-0.
- Pococke, R. (1745). A description of the East, and some other countries. Vol. 2. London: Printed for the author, by W. Bowyer.
- Porter, J. (2005). Through Samaria to Galilee and the Jordan: Scenes of the Early Life and Labors of Our Lord. Kessinger Publishing. ISBN 978-1-4179-7535-8.
- Pringle, D. (1998). The Churches of the Crusader Kingdom of Jerusalem: L-Z (excluding Tyre). Vol. II. Cambridge University Press. ISBN 0-521-39037-0.
- Robinson, E.; Smith, E. (1841). Biblical Researches in Palestine, Mount Sinai and Arabia Petraea: A Journal of Travels in the year 1838. Vol. 3. Boston: Crocker & Brewster.
- Savage-Smith, E.; van Gelder, G. J. H. (2005). A descriptive catalogue of Oriental manuscripts at St John's College, Oxford (Illustrated ed.). Oxford University Press. ISBN 978-0-19-920195-2.
- Schaberg, J. (2002). The resurrection of Mary Magdalene: legends, apocrypha and the Christian testament. Continuum International Publishing Group. ISBN 978-0-8264-1645-2.
- Schumacher, G. (1888). "Population list of the Liwa of Akka". Quarterly Statement - Palestine Exploration Fund. 20: 169–191.
- Seetzen, U.J. (1810). A Brief Account of the Countries Adjoining the Lake of Tiberias, the Jordan, and the Dead Sea. London: Palestine Association of London.
- Taylor, B. (1855). The Lands of the Saracen. New York: G.P. Putnam & co.
- Taylor, J.E. (2014). "Missing Magdala and the Name of Mary 'Magdalene'". Palestine Exploration Quarterly. 146 (3): 205–223. doi:10.1179/0031032814z.000000000110. S2CID 162227246.
- Wilson, C.W., ed. (c. 1881). Picturesque Palestine, Sinai and Egypt. Vol. 2. New York: D. Appleton. ( p.70 )
