= Raphael Greenberg =

Israeli archaeologist

Raphael Greenberg (Hebrew: רפאל גרינברג) is a senior lecturer in archaeology at Tel Aviv University.

Greenberg is the leading critic of the archaeological digs now underway at the Ophel, in Jerusalem.

Greenberg founded an organization called An Alternative Archaeological Tour of Ancient Jerusalem, to present his views of the ancient finds in the area of the Ophel. He explained to a reporter that "Archeology is all about interpretation. The findings don't speak for themselves, archeologists speak for them," arguing that there is insufficient evidence for Eilat Mazar's claim to have found King David's palace at the City of David archaeological site. "There is a large distance between 'could' and 'is.'"

In February 2025, Greenberg wrote an open letter criticising a planned conference on archaeology in the West Bank, saying that archaeology had been "weaponised" and used "as a lever to dispossess Palestinians and enlarge the settler footprint". Subsequently, Amichai Eliyahu, Israel's Heritage Minister, instructed the Israel Antiquities Authority (IAA) to cancel Greenberg's participation in the annual conference of the Israel Exploration Society. The conference was due to take place at the headquarters of the IAA. As a result the conference was postponed.

== Education ==
He received his B.A. from Hebrew University in 1981. He received his M.A. from Hebrew University in 1987. He received his Ph.D. from Hebrew University in 1997.

== Current projects ==
- Tel Bet Yerah Research and Excavation Project (TBYREP)
- Rogem Ganim Project in Community Archaeology

== Published works ==
=== Books ===
- A. Biran, D. Ilan and R. Greenberg. Dan I. Jerusalem: Hebrew Union College, 1996. 329 pp.; Part II: A. Gopher and R. Greenberg. The Pottery Neolithic Levels (pp. 65–81); Part III: R. Greenberg. The Early Bronze Age Levels (pp. 83–160).
- E. Eisenberg, A. Gopher, and R. Greenberg. Tel Te'o - A Neolithic, Chalcolithic, and Early Bronze Age Site in The Hula Valley. Israel Antiquities Authority Reports 13. Jerusalem: Israel Antiquities Authority, 2001. 227 pp.
- R. Greenberg. Early Urbanizations in the Levant: A Regional Narrative. New Approaches to Anthropological Archaeology. London: Leicester University Press, 2002. xii + 141 pp.
- R. Greenberg, E. Eisenberg, S. Paz and Y. Paz. Bet Yerah - The Early Bronze Age Mound: Vol. I - Excavation Reports 1933-1986. Israel Antiquities Authority Reports 30. Jerusalem: Israel Antiquities Authority, 2006.

=== Selected articles ===
- Stamped and Incised Jar Handles from Rogem Ganim, and Their Implications for the Political Economy of Jerusalem, Late 8th-Early 4th Centuries BCE. Tel Aviv. (with G. Cinamon).
- What's Cooking in EB II? In P. de Miroschedji and A. Maeir eds. I Will Speak the Riddles of Ancient Times: Archaeological and Historical Studies in Honor of Amihai Mazar on the Occasion of His Sixtieth Birthday. Winona Lake, 2006.
- Of Pots and Paradigms: Interpreting the Intermediate Bronze Age of Israel/Palestine. In S. Gitin et al. eds. W.G. Dever Festschrift. (with S. Bunimovitz).
- Notes on the Early Bronze Age Pottery: The 1998-2000 Seasons. In I. Finkelstein, D. Ussishkin and B. Halpern eds. Megiddo IV. Tel Aviv, 2006. pp. 151–167.
- The Early Bronze Age Fortifications of Tel Bet Yerah. Levant 37 (2005): 81-103 (with Y. Paz).
- An EB IA-EB III Stratigraphic Sequence from the 1946 Excavations at Tel Bet Yerah. Israel Exploration Journal 54 (2004): 1-23 (with S. Paz).
- Revealed in Their Cups: Syrian Drinking Practices in Intermediate Bronze Age Canaan. Bulletin of the American Schools of Oriental Research 334 (2004): 19-32 (with S. Bunimovitz).
- Early Bronze Age Megiddo and Bet Shean: Discontinuous Settlement in Socio-Political Context. Journal of Mediterranean Archaeology 16 (2003): 17-32.
- Discontinuities in Rural Settlement, Early Bronze Age to Middle Bronze Age I. In A. Maeir, S. Dar and Z. Safrai eds. The Rural Landscape of Ancient Israel. Oxford: British Archaeological Reports, 2003. pp. 27–42.
- Egypt, Bet Yerah, and Early Canaanite Urbanization. In E.C.M. van den Brink and T.E. Levy eds. Egyptian-Canaanite Interaction: From the 4th through Early 3rd Millennium B.C.E. (New Approaches to Anthropological Archaeology). London: Leicester University Press, 2002. pp. 213–222 (with E. Eisenberg).
- Archaeological Public Policy in Israel. In D. Korn ed. Public Policy in Israel: Perspectives and Practices. Rowman and Littlefield, 2002. pp. 191–203 (with A. Gopher and Z. Herzog).
