= Dalmanutha =

Unknown destination of Jesus on the shores of the Sea of Gallilee

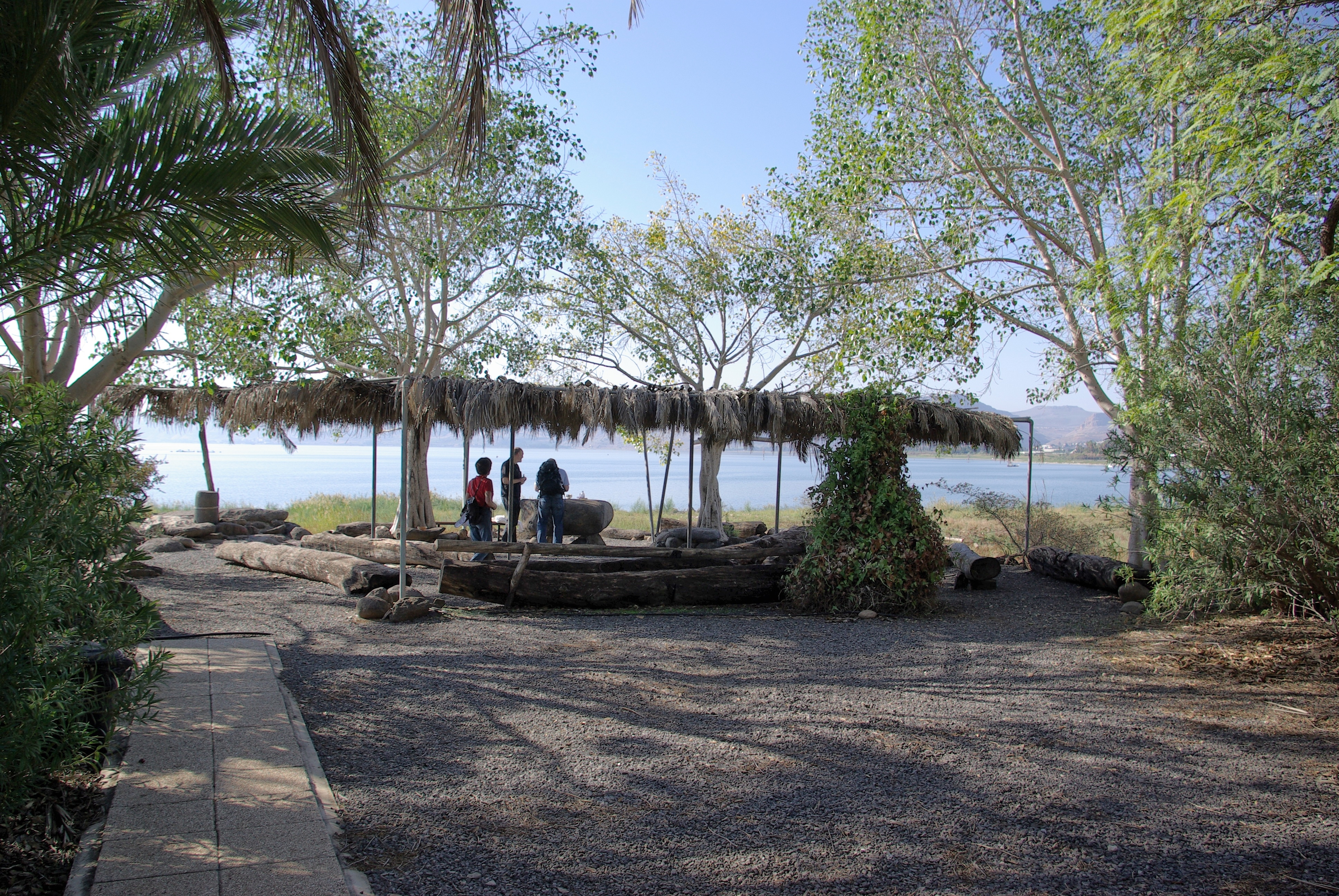
Place of worship close to Church of the Multiplication

Dalmanutha or Dalmanoutha (Greek: Δαλμανουθά) is the unknown destination of Jesus on the shores of the Sea of Gallilee after he fed the four thousand, as recorded in Mark's gospel (Mark 8:10). It is sometimes believed to be in the vicinity of Magdala, the alleged hometown of Mary Magdalene, since the parallel passage in Matthew's gospel, Matthew 15:39, refers instead to "Magadan", which has been taken to be a variant form of "Magdala".

In 2013, Ken Dark reported finding a possible location of Dalmanutha in the Ginosar Plain, placing the finding place of the famous 2000-years-old fishing boat right on the stretch of lakeshore belonging to this now ruined ancient town.

That there was ever a town called Dalmanutha is disputed by "public theologian" Joel L. Watts. He maintains that "Dalmanutha" is a cue to Mark's readers regarding the battle around Magdala during the Jewish Revolt.

== See also ==
- Magdala, related historical location
- Tarichaea, related historical location
