= Tarichaea =

Roman-era ruin along the shore of the Sea of Galilee

Tarichaea (Greek: Ταριχαία, Tarichaia) is the Greek place name for a historic site of disputed location. It was situated along the shore of the Sea of Galilee, and mentioned in the writings of Josephus (Ant. 14.120; 20.159; The Jewish War 1.180; 2.252; Vita 32, et al.). Tarichaea was one of the first villages in Galilee to have sustained an attack by Rome, during the First Jewish-Roman War. The village (κώμη) attracted to it the seditious from the outlying regions east of Galilee, who mixed with the local townsfolk and who relied upon some 230 boats on the Sea of Galilee for protection in the event of an assault upon the village. When the village was eventually overrun by the Roman army, the population surrendered.

== Etymology ==
In the first few centuries of the Common era, many places along the Egyptian coast had borne this name, Greek: Ταριχέαι, Tarichéai, this being a Greek loan-word derived from the people's employment in the preservation of fish, or what some called in Greek: ταρίχη, meaning, "pickled fish". The name was applied to a site along the coast of the Sea of Galilee, where the townsmen are thought to have occupied themselves in the same trade. Albright thought the name to mean "Fish-curing plants", or in modern parlance, "Fish canneries." Suetonius (Til. 4.3) mentions Tarichaea and Gamala as being "potent Judean cities" (Latin: urbes Iudaeae validissimae).

== History ==
=== Roman invasion (52 BCE) to 54 CE ===
In ca. 52 BCE, Judea was invaded by the Roman governor of Syria, Gaius Cassius Longinus, who fell upon the town of Tarichæa and carried away thirty thousand Jews into slavery.

Roughly one-hundred years later, in the first year of Emperor Nero's reign (54 CE), a stupendous gift was added to Agrippa II's realm, when Nero entrusted him with the government of a certain part of Galilee, Tiberias and Tarichæa.

=== First Jewish-Roman War (66–73 CE) ===
In the 12th-year of Nero's reign (66 CE), when war broke out between Rome and the Jews of Judea, Josephus was appointed governor of the Galilee by the Jewish leadership in Jerusalem, and took care to build the wall of Tarichæa, as well as the defensive walls of other towns in Galilee, in anticipation of a Roman assault against these cities.

At that time, Josephus chose Tarichæa for his place of residence. When certain young men of the village Dabarittha had robbed the king's steward of six-hundred pieces of gold, no small number of silver vessels and of many costly garments, at a time when he passed through their region of the country, Josephus retrieved the money and items when they came to him at Tarichæa, secretly hoping to return such items to the king, and withal blamed them for the violence they had offered the king. However, thinking that Josephus was not of like mind with them and that he secretly entertained notions of betraying them to the king who was allied with the Romans, they raised a commotion in all the neighboring cities, saying that Josephus had designs of betraying the people to the Romans. At this accusation, some one-hundred thousand armed men came to him at Tarichæa, which multitude was crowded together in the town's hippodrome (a place that should rather be considered as a race course devoid of monumental construction), and they raised a clamor against Josephus. Josephus' repartee and skill at oration was able to save himself from imminent danger, by suggesting that he had retrieved the money, not to return to the king, but to finish building the wall of Tarichæa. The indigenous people of Tarichæa, numbering then forty thousand, rose up to his defense and prevented his bloodshed. When the people of Tiberias eventually revolted against Josephus, Josephus devised methods to detain many of the city's governors and principal persons (among whom was Justus of Tiberias), having them transported by boats to Tarichæa where they were incarcerated.

With the exception of Jesus ben Shafat and his party who escaped from Tiberias and joined the seditious in Tarichæa, the people of Tiberias received the Roman army into their city and made peace with the Romans.

==== Outcome of war ====
Josephus, in his extensive accounts of the military history of Tarichaea, relates that Vespasian, the acting Roman general in ca. 64 CE, and his son, Titus, having received intelligence that "Tiberias was fond of innovations, and that Taricheae had revolted", were resolved to punish them. From Josephus' account, it follows that the Roman army moved from Scythopolis in the south to Tiberias in a northerly direction. Vespasian and his son, Titus, encamped with three legions at a place called Sennabris (Σενναβρís), south of Tiberias and "easily seen by the innovators," in preparation for the war with the insurgents. Sennabris was situated some 30 stadia (ca. 5.5 kilometres (3.4 mi)) from Tiberias. Vespasian's army first subdued Tiberias, before engaging the rebel forces in Tarichaea.

After entering Tiberias, Vespasian sent against Tarichaea four-hundred horsemen and two thousand archers, under Antonius and Silo, to repel those that were upon the wall. Josephus informs his readers that "after the battle, Vespasian held a court-martial in Tarichaea. Making a distinction between the residents and the newcomers whom he considered responsible for the war, he put the question to his staff whether these too should be spared. The verdict was that it would be against the public interest to set them free." By way of a contrivance, Vespasian permitted the residents to take leave only by the road that led to Tiberias, and when they had gone a certain distance, without suspecting anything, the Roman soldiers conducted them into the Stadium that was built in Tiberias. Of these, the aged and useless, numbering some 1,200, were slain by the soldiers at Vespasian's orders. Of the young men, he picked out 6,000 of the strongest and sent them to Nero at the Isthmus, to help in digging the Corinth Canal. The rest of the people, to the number of 30,400, he sold at auction, excepting only those whom he presented to Agrippa and who had come from his own kingdom.

Before the fall of the city, Josephus escaped and continued the prosecution of the war in Jotapata (Hebrew: יודפת), until he was captured there.

== Geographical location ==
The location of Tarichæa has been the subject of intensive debate; scholars not readily agreeing with each other on the site's location.

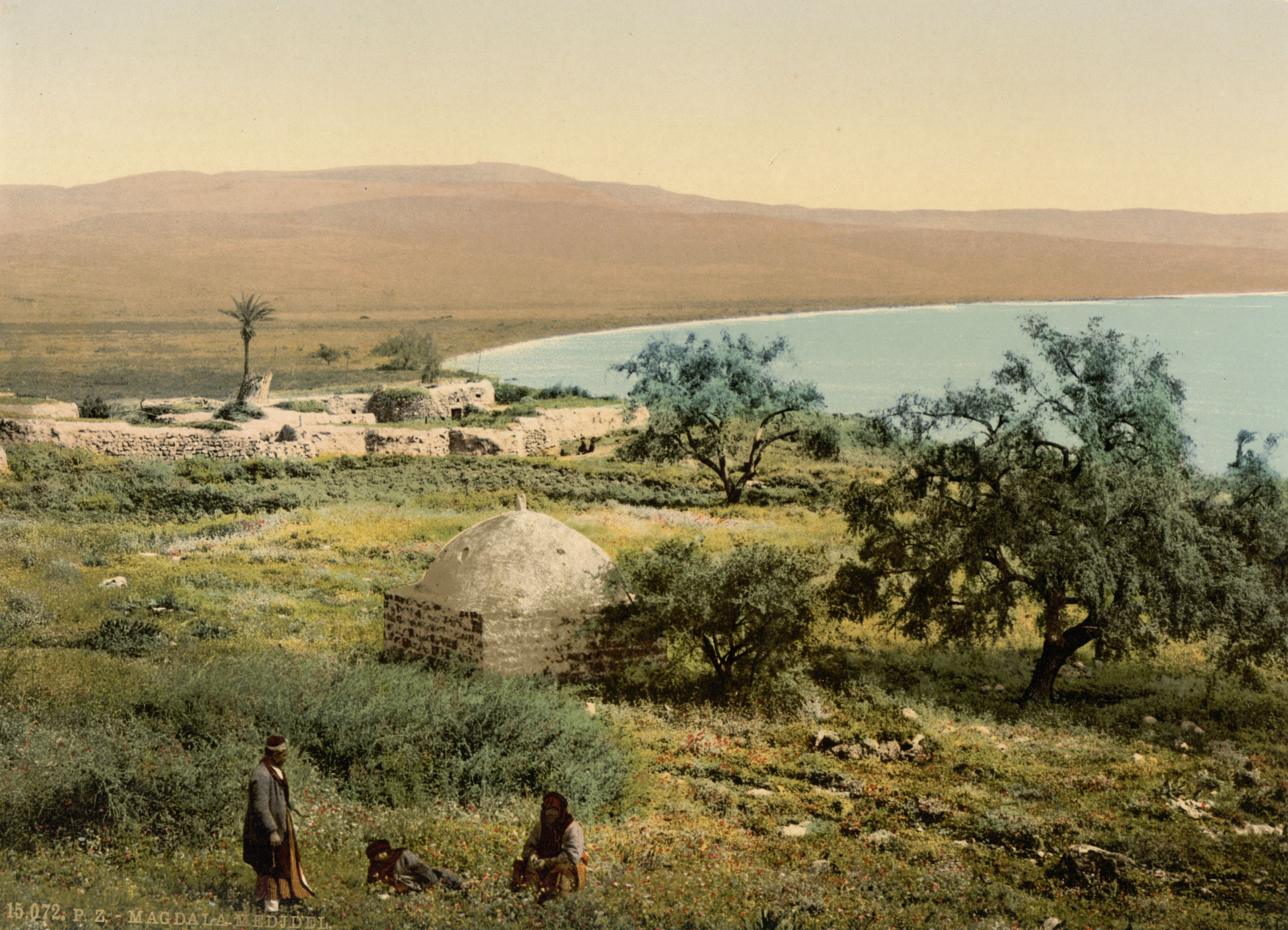
Tarichaea (Magdala) based on Albright's proposition

Tarichaea (based on Albright)
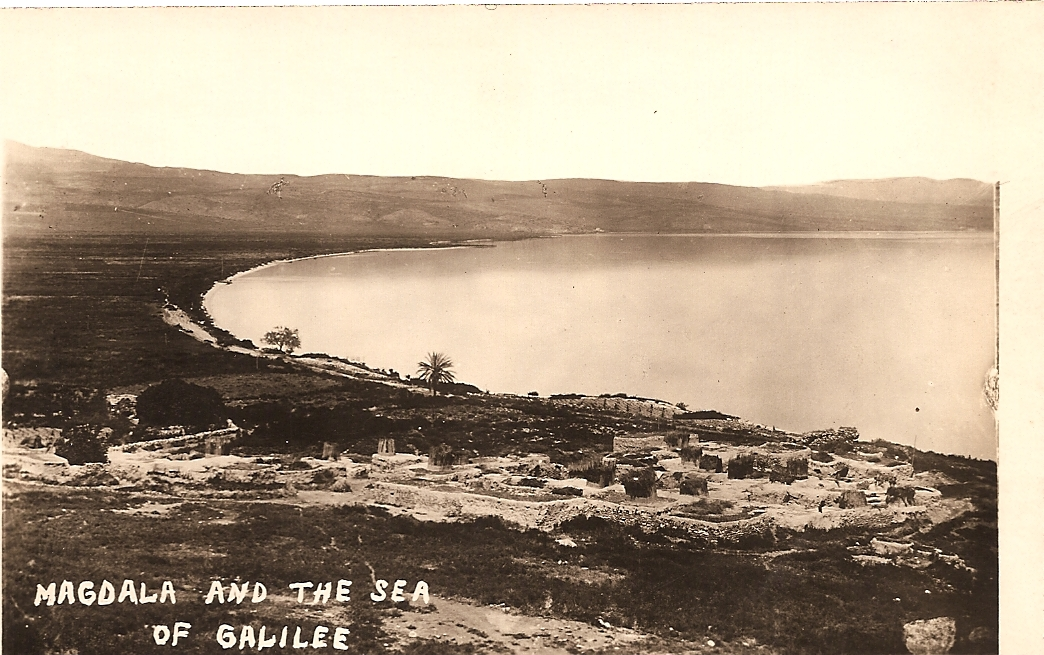

- Map of Israel
- 32°49′30″N 35°30′56″E
- Location: (Israel)
- Region: Lower Galilee

=== Josephus' description ===
Josephus frequently refers to a wealthy Galilean town, destroyed by the Romans in the Jewish War (66-73 CE) that has the Greek name Tarichaia from its prosperous fisheries. Josephus does not give a Hebrew name.

Josephus places Tarichæa along the shores of Lake of Gennesaret, 30 stadia from Tiberias, and places Gamala "over against Tarichæa, but on the other side of the lake." Josephus adds that while Gamala belonged to the Lower Gaulonitis, Tarichæa belonged to Lower Galilee. Another geographical feature of Tarichæa, according to Josephus, was that it was situated at the bottom of a mountain, and where there was also a plain before the city.

When Vespasian "was informed that Tiberias was fond of innovations, and that Taricheae had revolted," he and his son, Titus, came from Scythopolis and encamped with three legions at Sennabris (Σενναβρís - סנבראי), south of Tiberias, at a place "easily seen by the innovators."

=== Magdala ===
W.F. Albright proposed that the Arab village of Al-Majdal (the ancient Magdala) was to be identified with Tarichæa. This opinion is maintained by many scholars today, who, in this way, identify Tarichaea with Magdala. Thus, Migdal Nunayya ("the Tower of the Fish") would be the Hebrew name of Tarichaea ("the industry of salting fish"). It was also known in biblical times for flax weaving and dyeing. Although Josephus does not say if Tarichaea was north or south of Tiberias, he places the city some thirty stadia (furlongs) from Tiberias, or what are a little more than 5.5 kilometres (3.4 mi), which is approximately the distance from Tiberias to Magdala. Indeed, his description of the war against Tiberias and Tarichaea (cf. The Jewish War, book iii, chapter ix, § 7), putting Vespasian's camp at Sennabris, taking first Tiberias and then attacking Tarichaea, makes very plausible this position. Josephus, however, points out that Vespasian had left the bulk of his army at the station Sennabris when he sent a small contingent of 50 horsemen to make trial of the situation at Tiberias, further north, hoping to bring them under submission before it came to a fight. When the people of Tiberias welcomed the Roman army, and offered them their hands in peace, the army was then free to engage the rebels at Tarichaea. Given these difficulties, Albright himself recognised that "it may safely be said that the question of the exact site of Taricheae is the most complicated topographical problem in Palestine."

In 1878, H.H. Kitchener of the Palestine Exploration Fund suggested that the citadel of Tarichæa was to be identified with the ruin Khurbet Kuneitrîah, between Tiberias and Al-Majdal, 2.5 kilometres (1.6 mi) northwest of Tiberias. He retained that the "town itself was probably on the plain to the north, along the seashore, where there are traces of ruins and springs of water".

The main problem for this identification is that Magdala is in the west of the lake of Gennesareth, north of Tiberias, while Pliny the Elder places Tarichaea in the south of lake: The lake "is skirted by the pleasant towns of Julias and Hippo on the east, of Tarichea on the south (a name which is by many persons given to the lake itself), and of Tiberias on the west, the hot springs of which are so conducive to the restoration of health" (Naturalis Historia V:27).

Another difficulty has been pointed out by archaeologist Mordechai Aviam, who admits that during the archaeological excavations conducted at the site "no remains of fortifications or a destructionlayer were found", against what Josephus says of Tarichaea. Nevertheless, the same Aviam maintains that could be due to the fact that the walls "had been built with no deep foundations and in a very simple way" and therefore they "were taken apart either at the commandof the Romans or when the towns and cities grew many years after the war", and therefore he maintains the identification of Magdala and Tarichaea.

=== Sennabris (Khirbet Kerak - Malahha - Moshavat Kinneret) ===
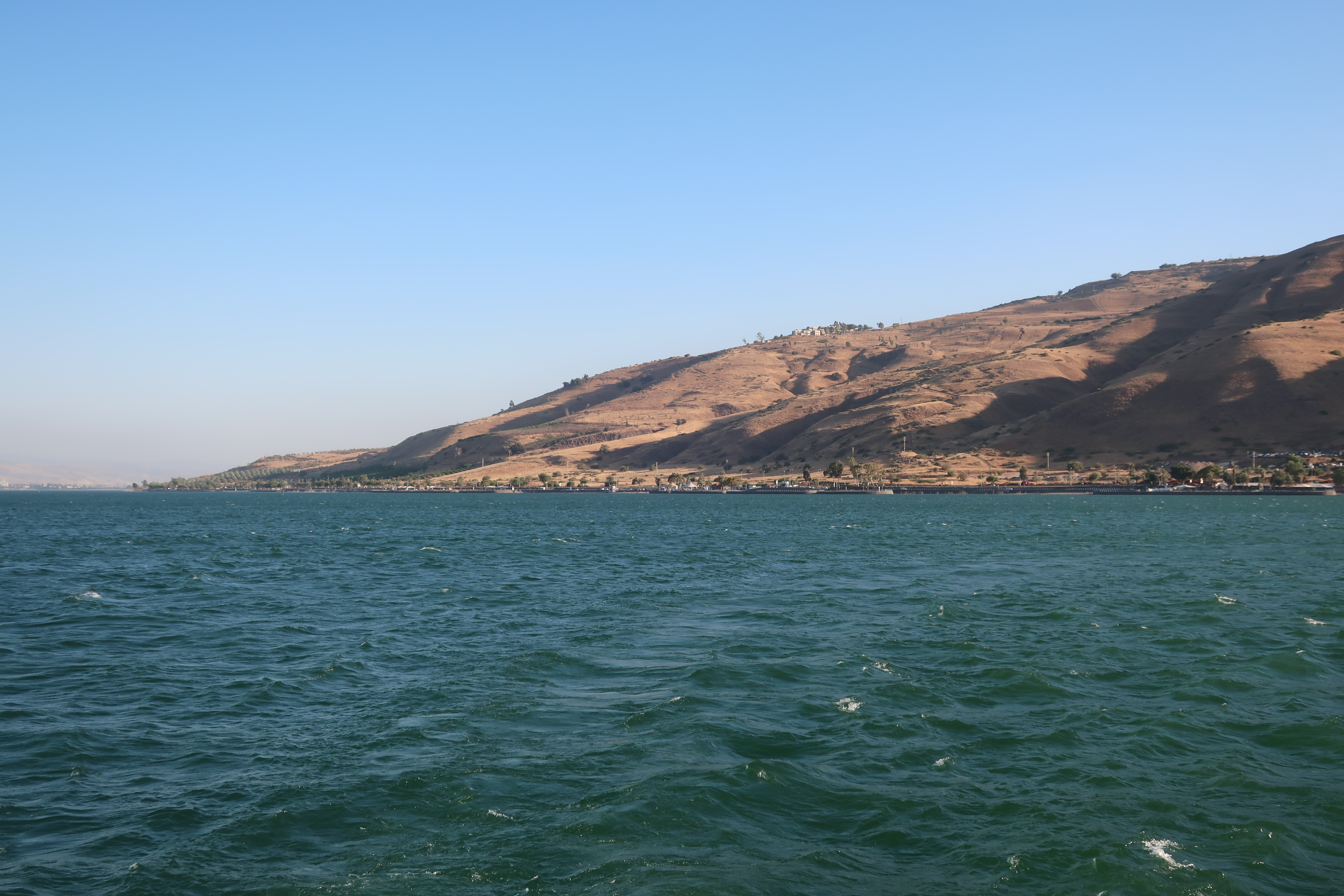
The south-west extremity of the Sea of Galilee as seen on the water

Tarichaea (based on Pliny)
- Taricheæ, Tarichaeae
- Map of Israel
- 32.717958°N 35.571864°E
- Location: (Israel)
- Region: Lower Galilee

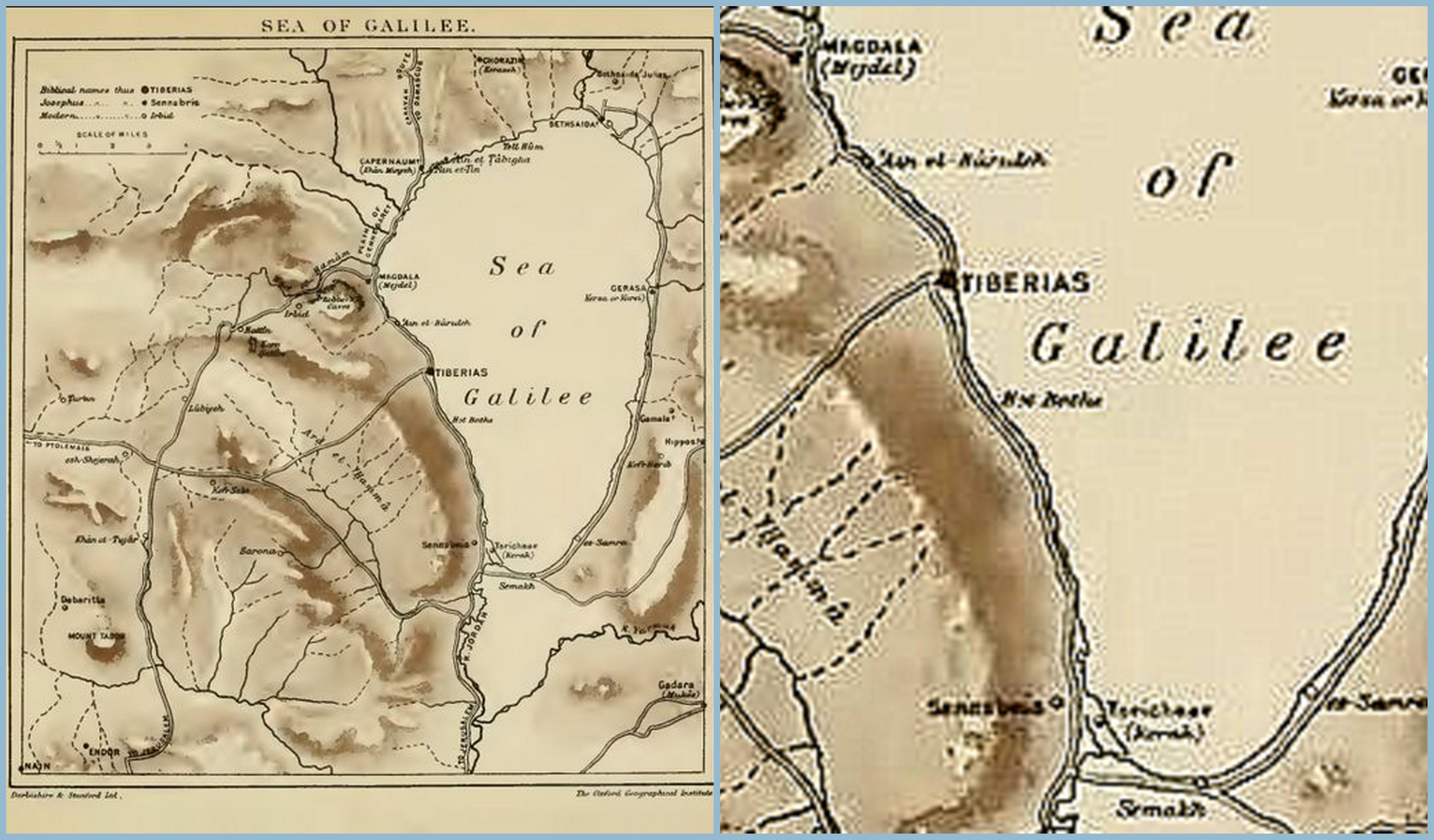
Location of Sennabris and Khirbet Kerak on 1903 map

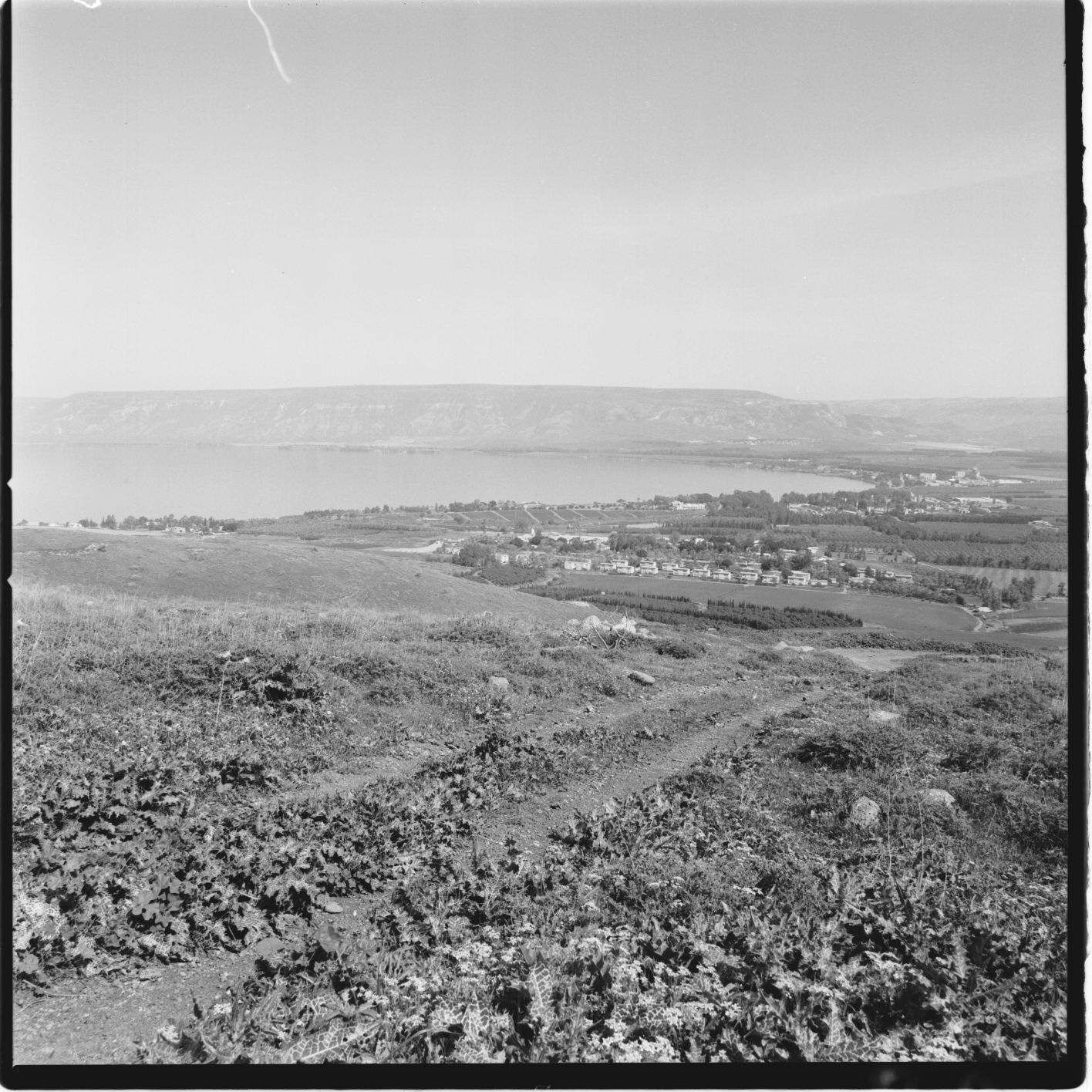
Moshavat Kinneret during the British Mandate, overlooking Kh. Kerak

Pliny the Elder, in his Natural History, placed Tarichæa to the south of the Sea of Galilee, while Tiberias is to the west of the lake.

Accordingly, the German traveller, Ulrich Jasper Seetzen, described Tarichaea in 1806 as being on the banks of the Sea of Galilee at its "southward extremity," near the town of Sennabris, saying that some ruins and some walls were still visible, and that the place still bore the name of el-Malahha, or Ard-el-Malahha, which is equivalent with the Greek name of Tarichæa, a name derived from the Greek word tarichos (salted fish). Seetzen surmised that the inhabitants of Tarichæa made use of ground salt that was plentiful in their town to cure the quantities of fish produced by the lake. Seetzen described the plain which he saw, directly upon leaving the vicinity of el-Malahha towards its south, southwest: "Here begins the beautiful plain of el-Ghôr, which greatly resembles the plain of el-B'kaa, between Anti-Libanus and Libanus, only that the two chains of mountains that surround it are not so striking as those of el-B'kaa." This plain would be the one described by Josephus as stretching in front of Tarichaea. The Arabic place-name can be spelled el-Malaḥa, Mallâha.

Still in the 19th century, Robinson suggested that Tarichaea was Khirbet Kerak, a place situated to the south of Tiberias. This opinion was followed by almost all 19th-century authors, Conder, C.R., W.M. Thomson, D.F. Buhl, E. Schürer and Ernest W.G. Masterman, among others. Victor Guérin thought that Tarichaea was to be placed either at Kh. el-Mallaḥa or Kh. Kerak, both south of Tiberias.

In 2010, archaeologist and historian Nikos Kokkinos proposed that Tarichaea was to be sought somewhere between the two Kinneret settlements, Moshava and Kvutza, or what is 1 to 1.5 km north and north-west of Tel Bet Yerach/Khirbet Kerak.

One of the arguments advanced by Kokkinos for locating Tarichaea south of Tiberias is that the Roman army was encamped at the station called Sennabris, a place "well within view (Greek: εὐσύνοπτος) of the rebels" (The Jewish War iii.443). Had Tarichaea been situated at Magdala or at Khurbet Kuneitrîah to the north of Tiberias, as opined by W.F. Albright and by H.H. Kitchener, respectively, the rebels could not have seen the Roman army encampment at Sennabris, 7.5 kilometres (4.7 mi) to the south, since this place is completely obstructed by the intervening hills.

The difficulty with these identifications is that some historical geographers have reasoned that the movement of the Roman army would have proceeded from a southern to northerly direction, without breaking off the movement. According to Josephus, Vespasian arrived from the south (Scythopolis) with his troops, and pitched his camp at Sennabris (a place near Khirbet Kerak). If Tarichaea indeed lay to the south of Tiberias, it seemed inconceivable that it would be bypassed by the Romans, without being dealt with first, while en route to Tiberias.

However, according to Kokkinos, this view would not take into account military stratagems, if they indeed existed, such as reconnoitering the Roman army to a place further north (Tiberias) where insurgents were also known to be, and to prevent their sallying-out to their brothers' defence in the south, and only afterwards to engage the enemy in the south (Tarichaea). Kokkinos, citing The Jewish War 3.462 and 4.11, suggests that, after the Roman army had subdued and secured Tiberias, Vespasian moved the remainder of his troops to Ammathus, one biblical mile south of Tiberias, where there are hot springs and where he could refresh his troops. Securing this site was deemed a strategic necessity, as it prevented those insurgents who fled from seeking refuge in Tarichaea. Had Tarichaea been situated to the north of Tiberias, moving the Roman army to Ammathus would not have prevented insurgents from escaping to the rebel stronghold. When Tarichaea was eventually subdued, it was from Ammathus also that the Roman army launched its attack against Gamala, opposite the lake.

== See also ==
- Dalmanutha, related biblical location
- Magdala, related historical location

== Bibliography ==
- Achtermeier, P.J., ed. (1996), The Harper Collins Bible Dictionary, San Francisco: Harper Collins
- Albright, W.F. (1921–1922), "Contribution to the Historical Geography of Palestine", Annual of the American Schools of Oriental Research in Jerusalem, vol. 2, pp. 1–46
- Albright, W.F. (1923a), "Contribution to the Historical Geography of Palestine", Annual of the American Schools of Oriental Research, vol. 2–3, New Haven: Yale University Press, pp. 29–46
- Albright, W.F. (1923b). "Some Archaeological and Topographical Results of a Trip through Palestine". Bulletin of the American Schools of Oriental Research. 11 (11): 3–14. doi:10.2307/1354763. JSTOR 1354763. S2CID 163409706.
- Aviam, Mordechai (2008). "The Fortified Settlements of Josephus Flavius and Their Significance against the Background of the Excavations of Yodefat and Gamla". In Guri-Rimon, Ofra (ed.). The great revolt in the Galilee. Hecht Museum, University of Haifa. ISBN 978-965-7034-18-7.
- Avi-Yonah, M. (1940). Map of Roman Palestine (2 ed.). London.
- Bauckham, R. (2018). Magdala of Galilee: A Jewish City in the Hellenistic and Roman Period. Baylor University Press. ISBN 9781481302937.
- Buhl, D. Frants [in German] (1896). Geographie des alten Palästina (Geography of ancient Palestine) (in German). Leipzig: J.C.B. Mohr (Paul Siebeck).
- Conder, C.R. (1877). "Tent Work in Palestine". Palestine Exploration Fund Quarterly Statement.
- Conder, C.R. (1879). Tent Work in Palestine - A Record of Discovery and Adventure. Vol. 2. London: Richard Bentley & Son.
- Conder, C.R.; Kitchener, H.H. (1881). The Survey of Western Palestine: Memoirs of the Topography, Orography, Hydrography, and Archaeology (Galilee). Vol. 1. London: Committee of the Palestine Exploration Fund.
- Flavius, Josephus (1989). The Jewish War. Translated by H. StJ. Thackeray (Loeb Classical Library ed.). Cambridge Massachusetts: Harvard University Press. ISBN 0-674-99223-7.
- Gardner, L. (2005). The Magdalene legacy. London: Element (Harper Collins). ISBN 0-00-720186-9.
- Guérin, V. (1880). Description Géographique Historique et Archéologique de la Palestine (in French). Vol. 1: Galilée, pt. 1. Paris: L'Imprimerie Nationale.
- Josephus (1980) [First published 1959]. The Jewish War. Penguin Classics. Translated by Williamson, G.A. (Revised ed.). Penguin Books.
- Josephus (1981). Josephus Complete Works. Translated by William Whiston. Grand Rapids, Michigan: Kregel Publications. ISBN 0-8254-2951-X.
- Kitchener, H.H. (1878). "Survey of Galilee" (PDF). Palestine Exploration Fund Quarterly Statement.
- Kokkinos, Nikos (2010). "The Location of Tarichaea: North or South of Tiberias?". Palestine Exploration Quarterly. 142 (1): 7–23. doi:10.1179/003103209X12483454548167. S2CID 161794831. (Abstract) (see Nikos Kokkinos - A Biographical Sketch)
- Mason, S. (2003). Life of Josephus. Translated by Steve Mason. Leiden: Brill. ISBN 978-0-391-04205-6.
- Masterman, Ernest William Gurney (1909). Studies in Galilee. Chicago: The University of Chicago press. OCLC 250486251.
- Pliny the Elder (1947). H. Rackham (ed.). Natural History. Vol. 2. Cambridge: Harvard University Press. p. 275 (book v, chapter xv, section 71).
- Robinson, E.; Smith, E. (1841). Biblical Researches in Palestine, Mount Sinai and Arabia Petraea: A Journal of Travels in the year 1838. Vol. 3. Boston: Crocker & Brewster.
- Robinson, E.; Smith, E. (1856). Biblical Researches in Palestine, and in the Adjacent Regions (Journal of Travels in the Year 1838). Vol. 2. Boston: Crocker & Brewster.
- Schürer, E. (1891). Geschichte des jüdischen Volkes im Zeitalter Jesu Christi [A History of the Jewish People in the Time of Jesus Christ]. Vol. 1. Translated by Miss Taylor. New York: Charles Scribner's Sons.
- Seetzen, U.J. (1810). Brief Account of the Countries adjoining the Lake of Tiberias. London: Palestine Association of London.
- Thomson, W.M. (1859). The Land and the Book: Or, Biblical Illustrations Drawn from the Manners and Customs, the Scenes and Scenery, of the Holy Land. Vol. 2 (1 ed.). New York: Harper & brothers.
- Vilnay, Z. (1954). "Identification of Talmudic Place Names". The Jewish Quarterly Review. 45 (2): 130–140. doi:10.2307/1452901. JSTOR 1452901.
