= Migdal, Israel =

Migdal: מִגְדָּל; مغدال
- Local council (from 1949)

Hebrew transcription(s)
  - ISO 259: Migdal
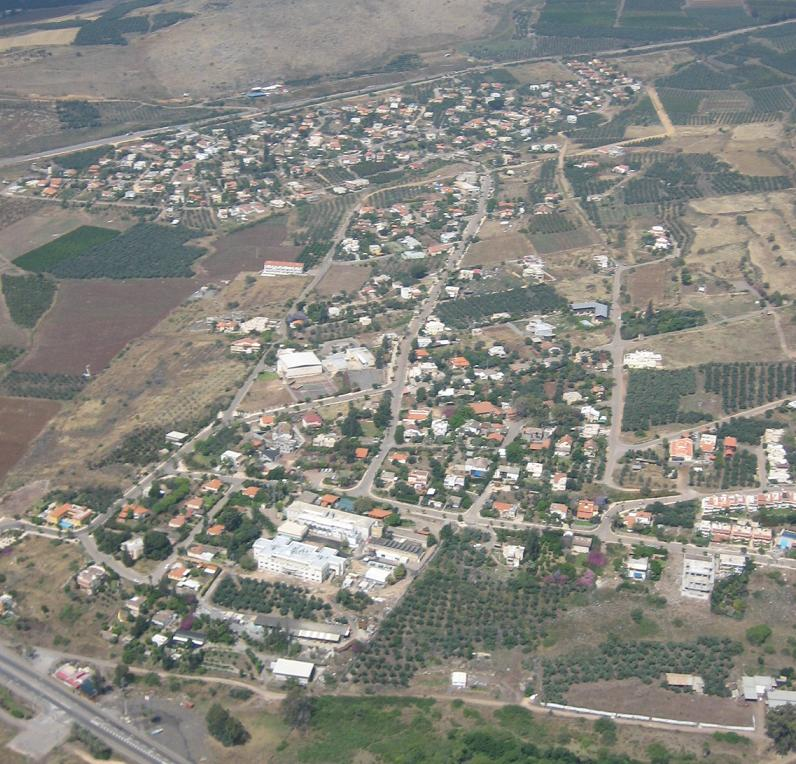
- Migdal from above

- Location within Northeast Israel Location within Israel
- Coordinates: 32°50′20.68″N 35°29′57.46″E
- Country: Israel
- District: Northern
- Subdistrict: Kinneret
- Natural Region: Kinerot
- Founded: 1910

Government
  - Head of Municipality: Israel Sason Amrosi

Area
  - Total: 11,395 dunams (11.395 km^{2}; 4.400 sq mi)

Population (2024)
  - Total: 2,162
  - Density: 189.7/km^{2} (491.4/sq mi)
- Name meaning: Tower

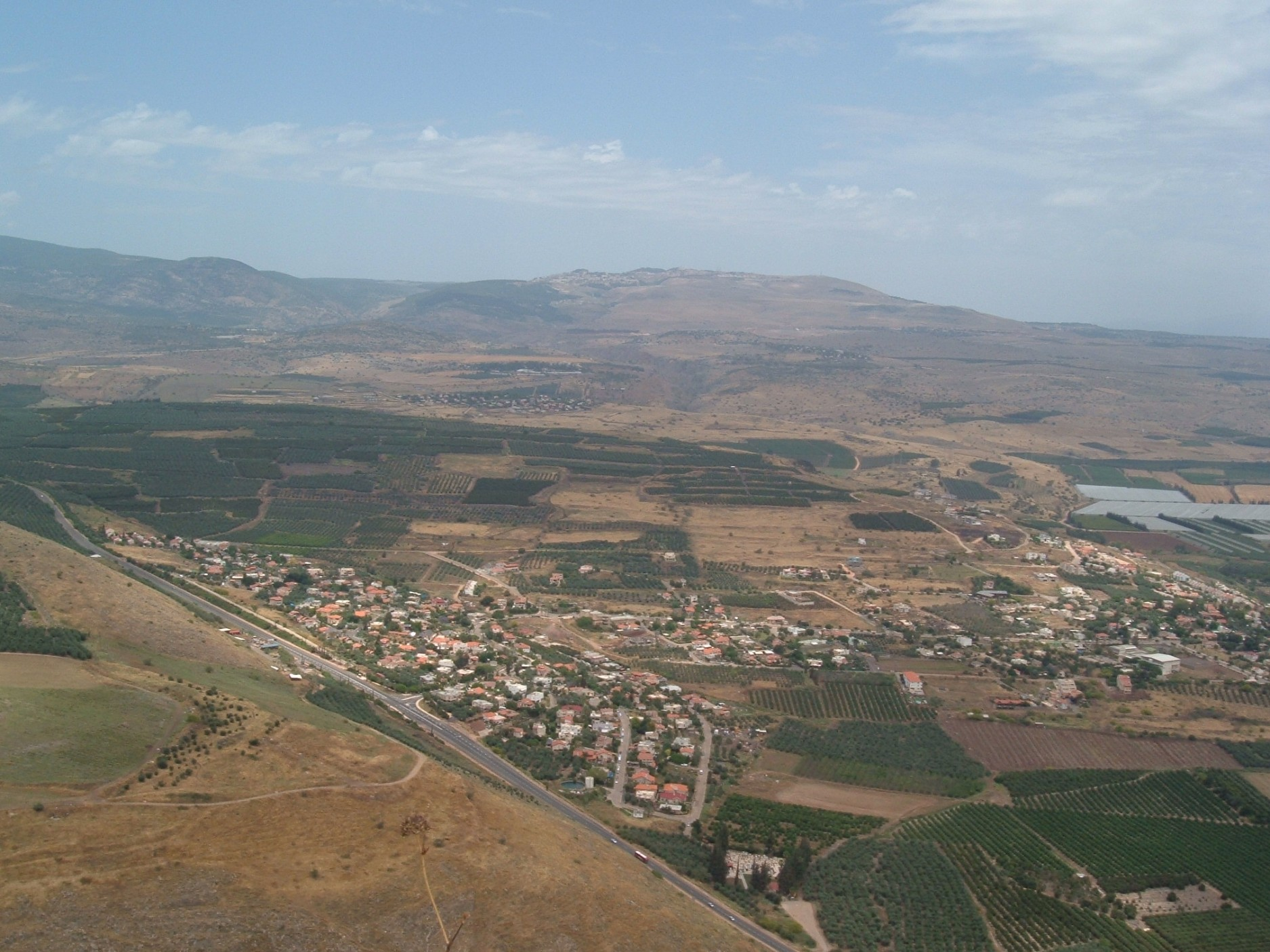
Aerial view of Migdal

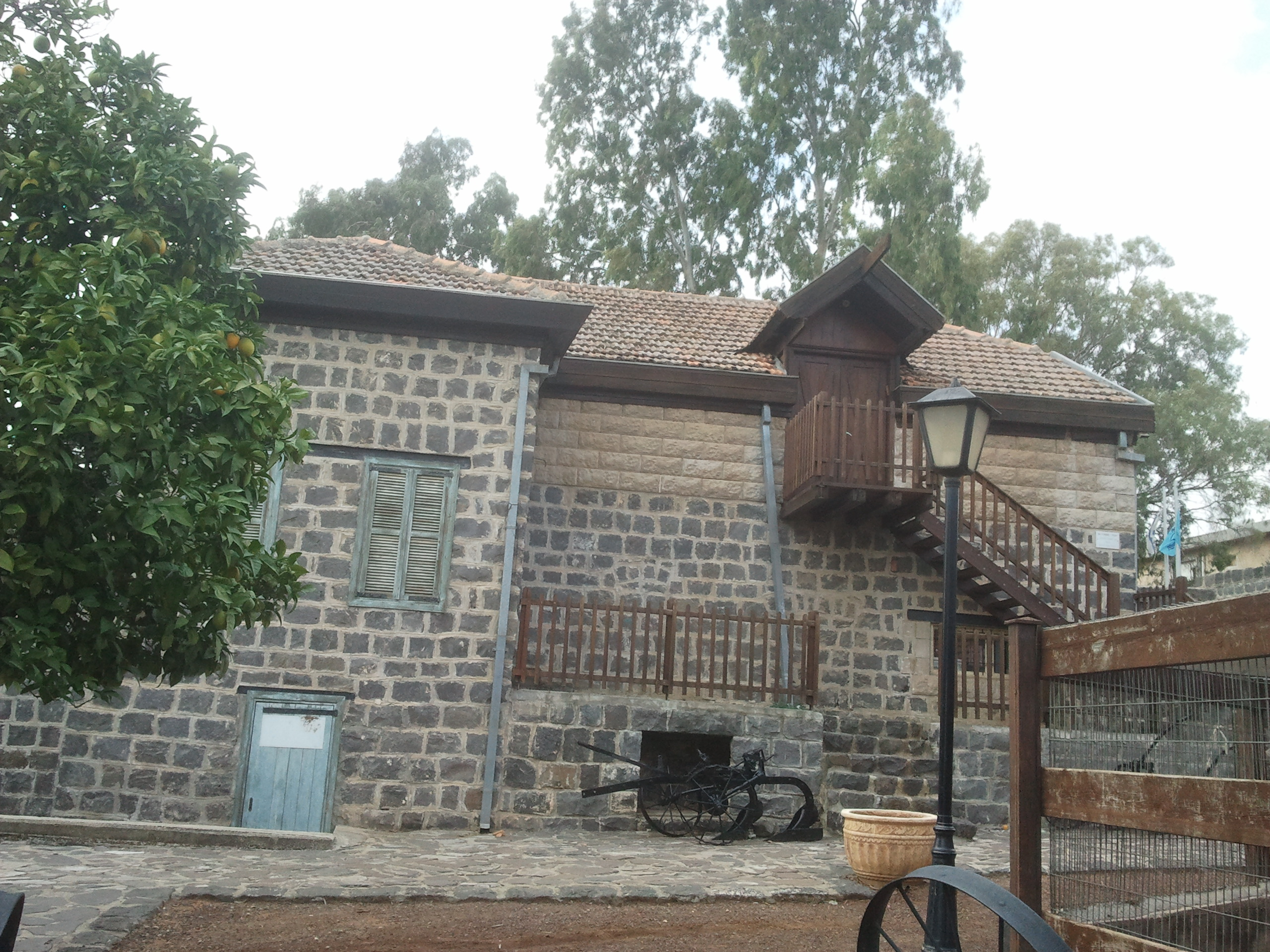
Migdal historical museum

Migdal (Hebrew: מִגְדָּל, lit. 'Tower') is a town in the Northern District of Israel. It was founded in 1910, and granted local council status in 1949. In 2024 it had a population of 2,162. Migdal is located near Ginosar, and about 8 km north of Tiberias. It has a shoreline on the Sea of Galilee, including the Tamar, Ilanot and Arbel beaches.

== History ==
Migdal is named after a city from the Second Temple period called "Magdala". The ancient city is believed to have been located on the site of the depopulated village of al-Majdal, which preserved the name.

In 1908, a small group of German Catholics who identified the site as the birthplace of Mary Magdalene settled there. They left after a year and the land was bought by Russian Zionists who founded a training farm, Ahuzat Moskva (Moscow Estate) in 1910. This settlement was adjacent to the Arab village al-Majdal. The pioneers were members of the Hovevei Zion (“Lovers of Zion”) movement, under the leadership of Moshe Glikin. They included several who became key figures in the history of Jewish settlement, among them Joseph Trumpeldor and J.H. Brenner.

A few years later, the land was sold to private investors. An encampment of Gdud HaAvoda workers who built the Tiberias-Rosh Pinna road was established there in 1921.

According to a census conducted in 1922 by the British Mandate authorities, Migdal had a population of 51 inhabitants, consisting of 42 Jews and 9 Muslims.

== Demographics ==
In 2022, 96.9% of the population was Jewish and 3.1% was counted as other.

== Landmarks ==
In 1998, a local history museum was founded in one of the farm’s first buildings.

== Notable residents ==
- Maxim Vengerov (born 1974), Russian-born Israeli violinist, violist, and conductor
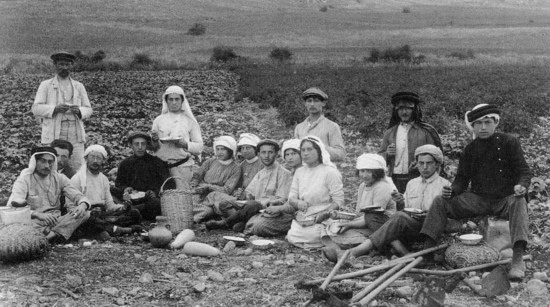
Bilu pioneers in Migdal, 1912

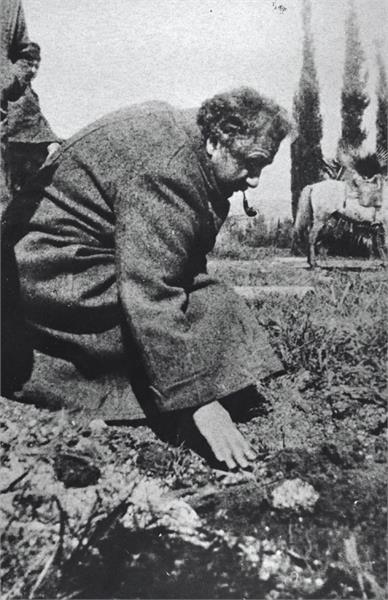
Migdal 1923: Albert Einstein planting tree

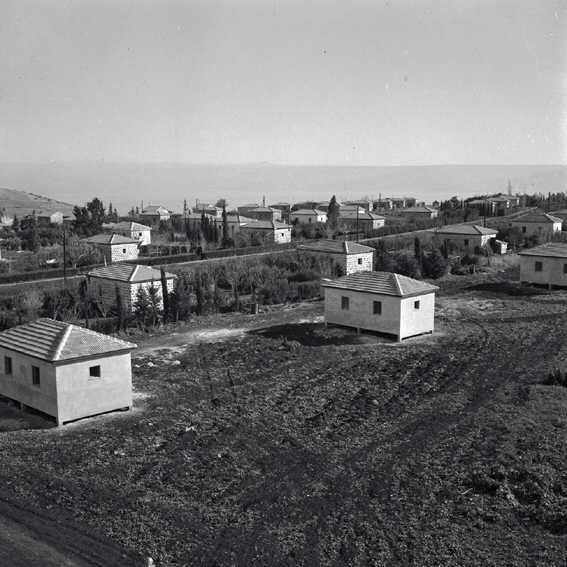
Migdal 1945
