= Khirbet Kerak =

Archaeological site in Israel

Tell Beth Yerah
- Khirbet al-Karak
- Beth Yerah, Tell Beth Yerah, Tel Bet Yerah
- Location within Israel
- 32.717958°N 35.571864°E
- Periods: Bronze Age - Crusader period
- Location: (Israel)

Site notes
- Area: c.250 Dunams
- Archaeologists: Na'im Makhouly, Benjamin Mazar, Michael Avi-Yonah, Moshe Sheteklis, Emanuel Dunayevsky, Pesach Bar-Adon, P.L.O. Guy, Ruth Amiran, Rafi Greenberg, Pinhas Delougaz, Richard C. Haines
- Website: Tel Bet Yerah Research and Excavation Project

Khirbet Kerak or Khirbat al-Karak (Arabic: خربة الكرك Khirbet al-Karak, "the ruin of the fortress") or Beth Yerah (Hebrew: בית ירח, "House of the Moon (god)") is a tell (archaeological mound) located on the southern shore of the Sea of Galilee in modern-day Israel. The tell spans an area of over 50 acres—one of the largest in the Levant—and contains remains dating from the Early Bronze Age (c. 3000 BCE - 2000 BCE) and from the Persian period (c. 450 BCE) through to the Early Islamic period (c. 1000 CE).

Khirbet Kerak ware is a type of Early Bronze Age Syro-Palestinian pottery first discovered at this site. It is also found in other parts of the Levant, including Jericho, Beth Shan, Tell Judeideh, and Ugarit. Khirbet Kerak culture appears to have been a Levantine version of the Early Transcaucasian culture, also known as the Kura-Araxes or Kur-Araz culture.

== Location ==
The tell of Khirbet Kerak lies where the Sea of Galilee empties into the Jordan River and the terrain rises by c. 15 meters above the level of the lake. It is triangular in shape and approximately 1.2 km by 380 m (at its widest point), covering 60-75 acres. The Jordan river runs to the south, although it previously (until at least the medieval period) ran north and west of it.

== History ==
The tell of Khirbet Kerak was at certain times the site of twin towns, Bet Yerah and Sinnabris.

Beth Yerah means "House of the Moon (god)". Though it is not mentioned in the Hebrew Bible or other Bronze or Iron Age sources, the name may preserve, at least in part, the Canaanite toponym of Ablm-bt-Yrh, "the city/fort (qrt) of his-majesty Yarih". As Ablm (Heb. Abel), this location is mentioned in the 14th century BCE Epic of Aqhat, and is thought to be a reference to the Early Bronze Age structure extant at Khirbet Kerak.

The name Bet Yerah has generally been accepted and applied to the site of Khirbet Kerak, though the evidence for its being located there is circumstantial.

=== Early Bronze Age (3300/3500-2200 BCE) ===
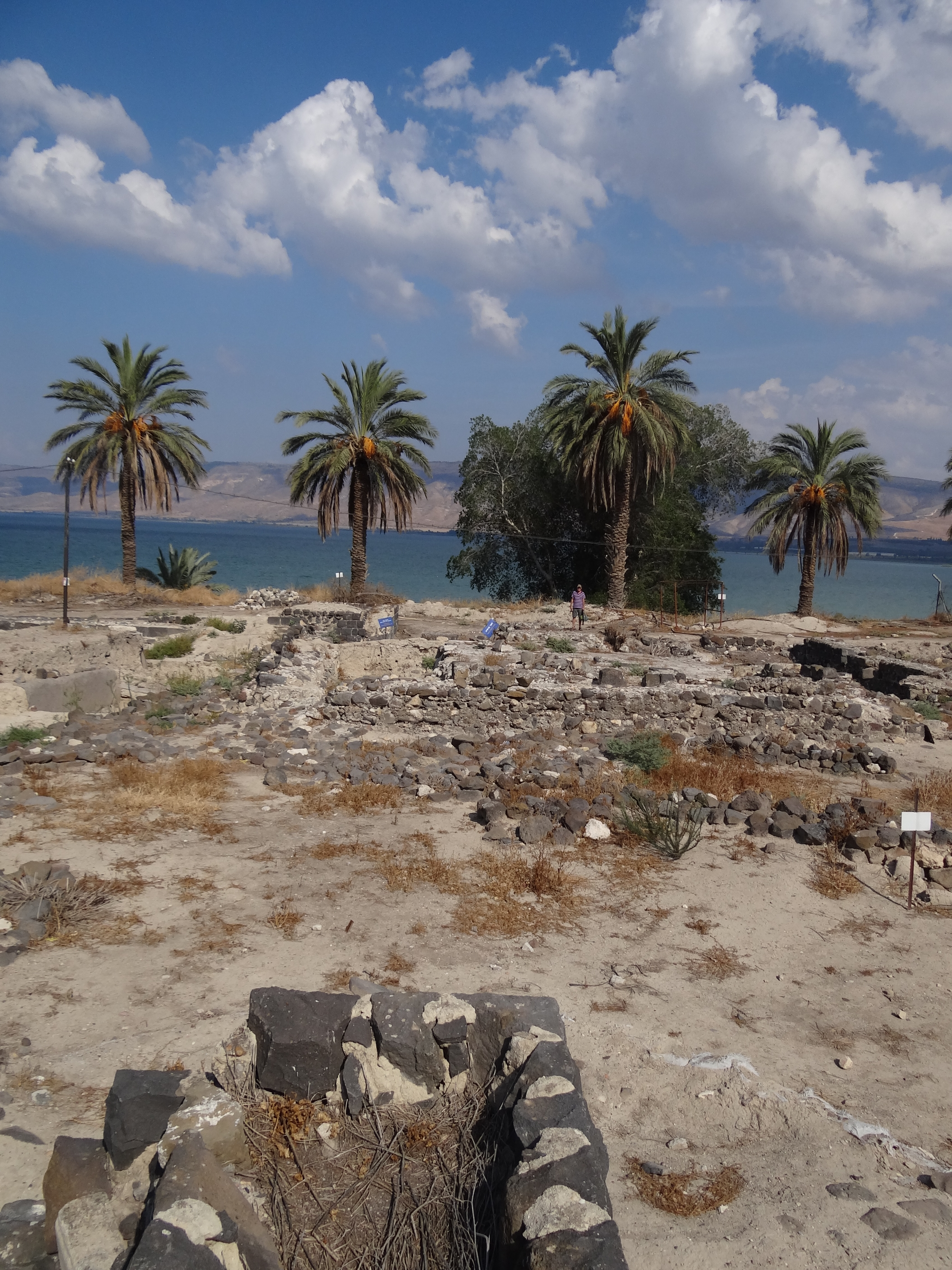
Tel Beth Yerah

Excavators have identified four levels of occupation from the Early Bronze Age (EB). Architectural development shows the procession from (sometimes oval) pit dwellings (I) to mud-brick (II), to basalt foundations with mud-brick (III), and then on to basalt structures (IV), over approximately 1000 years. At its peak the site reached a size of 20 hectares with an 8-meter thick fortification wall. It was abandoned at the end of the Early Bronze III period.

The 2009 discovery at the tell of a stone palette with Egyptian motifs, including an ankh, points to trade/political relations with the First dynasty of Egypt, at approximately 3000 BCE.

==== Khirbet Kerak pottery ====
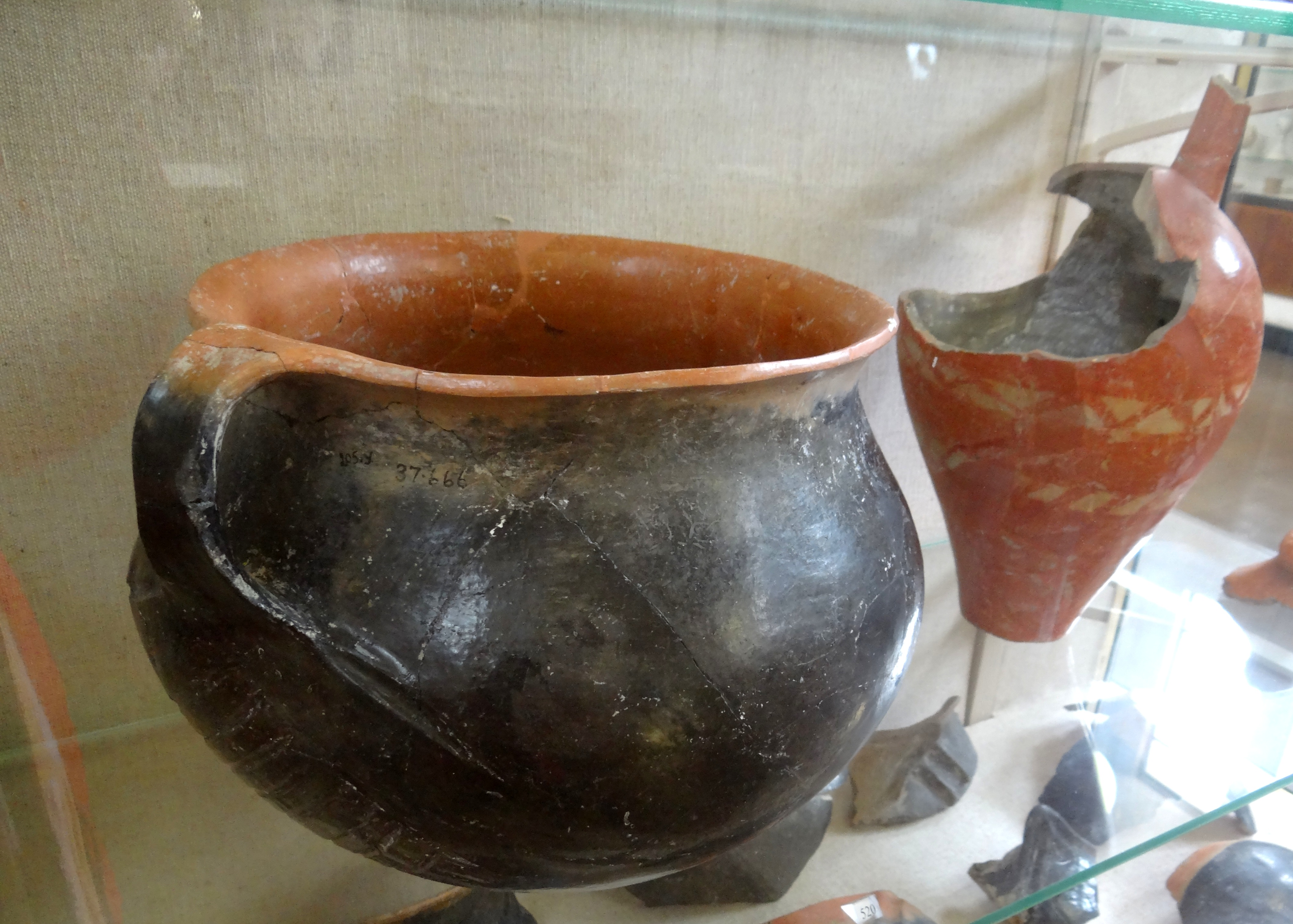
Beth Yerah Pottery

The basalt houses belong to the same phase as the Khirbet al-Kerak pottery, dated to the Early Bronze Age III. From the earliest phases, the settlement was protected from the south and west by a city wall (the north and east facing the Sea of Galilee). The wall consisted of three connecting parallel walls, forming a massive wall, 25 feet (7.6 m) thick, built of mud-bricks. The gate was on the south and was built of basalt. Evidence of an urban, orthogonal layout was found, dating to the EB II, supporting the claim that the city was one of the regional urban centers of the period.

A large (90×120 feet) building ("the circles building") was built, though not completed in the EBII, at the northern part of the tell. Of this building only the basalt foundations of the walls remain, in the form of a pavement 30 feet (9.1 m) wide. In this pavement, seven sunken large circles were found. Each circle is intersected by two partition walls forming four compartments. In the courtyard were ovens in which Khirbet al-Kerak pottery was found. The building is generally identified as a public granary. At full capacity, the granary could hold an estimated 1700 tons of grain. Below this building, remains dated to both EB I(b) and EB II were found. At the beginning of EBIII, when signs of upheaval appear elsewhere at the site, the area was repurposed as a residential area. This change was marked by the appearance of Khirbet Kerak Ware marking the arrival of migrants to the site.

New excavation at Tel Bet Yerah of layers associated with Khirbet Kerak Ware have been conducted in 2014 by R. Greenberg et al. In these contexts, significant discontinuity from the local tradition was found. This is showing influence from the world of Eastern Anatolia and the Upper Euphrates region. As a result, the introduction of Khirbet Kerak Ware in the Levant ca 2800 BCE is probable. It is further suggested that this provides evidence of kin-based group migration.

=== Middle Bronze Age (2200–1550 BCE) ===
Around 2000 BCE, the city was destroyed or abandoned. From the Middle Bronze Age I, a paved street, a potters workshop and other remains were excavated. Middle Bronze Age II is represented by a tomb. Parts of the city walls are also dated to the MB.

=== Iron Age ===
There are no signs of habitation from 1200 to 450 BCE until the site's reuse during the Persian period.

=== Hellenistic period: Bet Yerah/Philoteria and Sennabris ===
A city established at Bet Yerah during Ptolemaic rule (3rd century BCE), as indicated by archaeological remains, did not endure after the end of the Early Hellenistic period (i.e. the time before the Maccabean Revolt of 167-160 BCE). Chancey (2001) cautiously identifies it with Philoteria, a city about which little is known from ancient sources. The Greek name was chosen by Ptolemy II Philadelphus, who named it for his sister. Hellenistic remains identified as those of ancient Philoteria by Amihai Mazar consist of "a considerable number of spacious town-houses built on an orthogonal plan within the confines of the Early Bronze Age fortifications. The total extent of the settlement was about 700 meters from north to south, and 200 meters from east to west. Ceramic and other finds of the 3rd-2nd centuries BCE were abundant in this settlement, and some houses had remains of decorated wall plaster." Four villas in Philoteria/Bet Yerah dating to the late Hellenistic period are the oldest known examples of the big mansion (domus), a type of domestic architecture seen in Roman-Byzantine period Palestine. One of them measures 22 x 12 metres and consists of 11 rooms decorated with marble, stucco, and mosaics that were accessed by way of an entrance to a colonnaded courtyard.

The twin city of Bet Yerah/Philoteria was known in the Hellenistic times by the Greek name Sennabris.

=== Roman period: Bet Yerah/Kerakh and Sinnabri ===
In the Roman period, two settlements shared the site of the old tell: Bet Yerah or Kerakh, and Sinnabri. The Jerusalem Talmud mentions Bet Yerah as sitting alongside Sinnabri (later named al-Sinnabra by Arabs), describing both as walled cities, but also uses the name Kerakh to refer to Bet Yerah.

During the Roman period, a fortress was built there and the place became known and named for this feature. Kerakh, meaning "fortress", was the Aramaic name for the site in the Roman period, and it is from this name that the Arabic Khirbet al-Kerak ("ruins of the castle") is derived.

=== Byzantine and Early Islamic periods ===
In the Byzantine period, a church was constructed there and it shows signs of having been reused as a dar, or manor house, during the Early Islamic period.

Hellenistic Sinnabris became known as al-Sinnabra or Sinn en-Nabra in Arabic.

An Arab Islamic palatial complex or qasr in al-Sinnabra, known by the same name, served as a winter resort to Mu'awiya, Marwan I, and other caliphs in Umayyad-era Palestine (c. 650-704 CE). For decades, part of this complex was misidentified as a Byzantine-era (c. 330-620 CE) synagogue; excavations carried out in 2010 confirmed an architectural analysis made by Donald Whitcomb in 2002 suggesting the building to be the qasr of al-Sinnabra. Constructed in the 7th century by Mu'awiya and Abdel Malik, another Umayyad caliph who also commissioned the building of the Dome of the Rock in Jerusalem, it likely represents the earliest Umayyad complex of this type yet to be discovered.

=== Crusader period ===
During the Crusades, it was the site of the 1113 Battle of Al-Sannabra, and in the lead up to the Battle of Hittin in 1187, Saladin and his forces passed through al-Sinnabra before moving on to command the roads around Kafr Sabt.

== Archaeological work ==
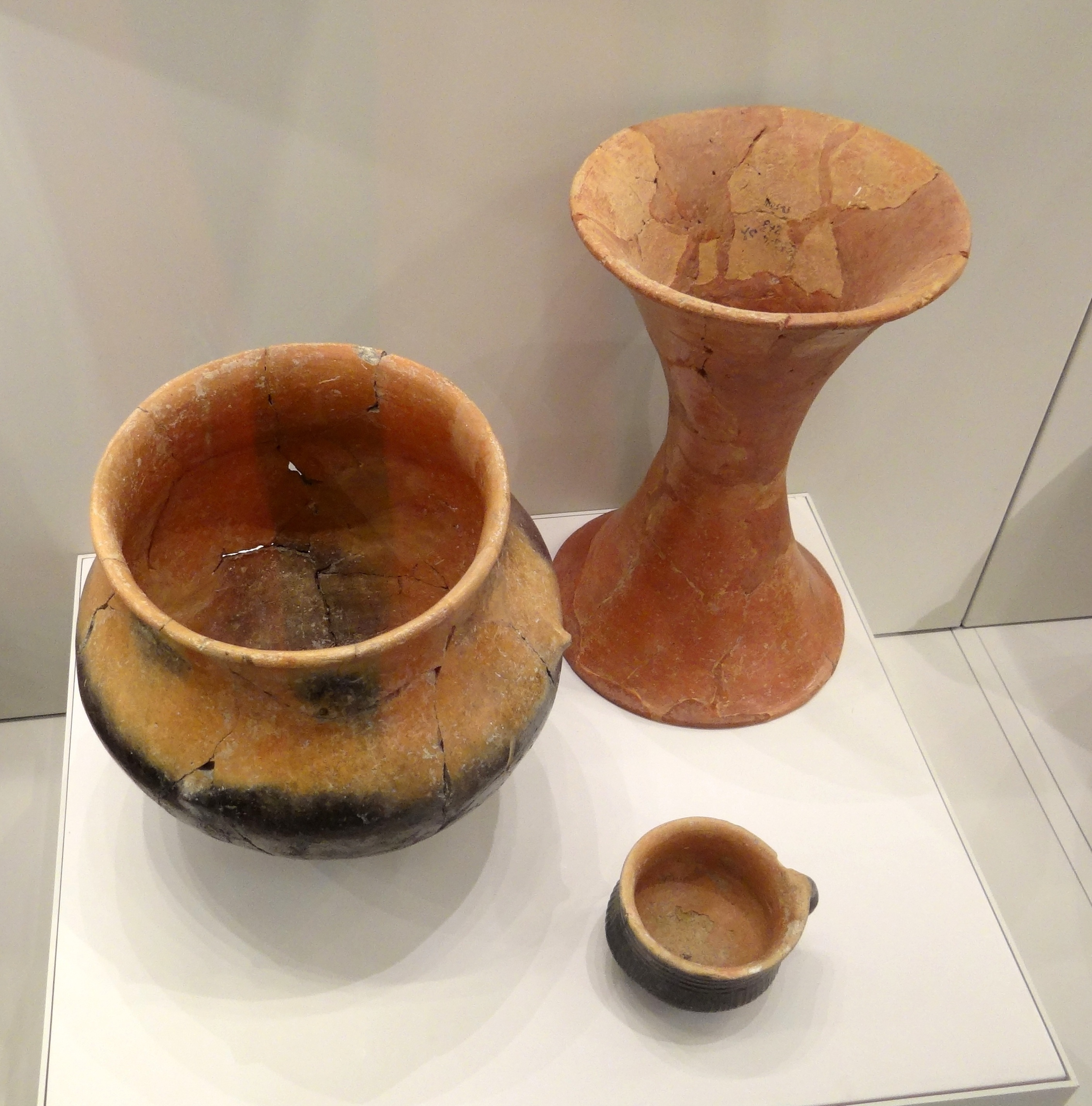
Khirbet Kerak (or Beth Yerah) pottery from Early Bronze Age

The tell was first surveyed in the 1920s first by Eleazar Sukenik and then later by William Foxwell Albright. In 1933, Na'im Makhouly, a Christian Palestinian from Nazareth, who was an inspector for the Mandate Department of Antiquities at the time of the construction of the Samak-Tiberias highway that cut across the tell, conducted a salvage excavation.

During the 1940s, parts of the tell were excavated by Benjamin Mazar, Michael Avi-Yonah, Moshe Sheteklis, and Emanuel Dunayevsky. In 1946, in the northern quadrant of the tell, a fortified compound consisting of a series of large structures, including a bathhouse adjoined to large apsidal hall that is decorated with colorful mosaics, was discovered just above the granary (AKA the Circles Building), an Early Bronze Age structure uncovered in previous excavations.

Between 1950 and 1953, P.L.O. Guy and Pesach Bar-Adon, two Israeli archaeologists excavated the compound, falsely identifying a building there as a 5th-6th century synagogue, because of the presence of a column base engraved with a seven-branched candelabrum.

Excavations by the Oriental Institute of the University of Chicago led by Pinhas Delougaz and Richard C. Haines in 1952-1953 uncovered a Byzantine church to the north of the fortified compound. The Oriental Institute team returned to excavate at the site in 1963 and 1964.

In 1976, Ruth Amiran conducted a salvage excavation on the tell. More salvage excavations were carried out by Nimrod Getzov in 1994 and 1995.

In the summer of 2003, excavations were renewed in the northern part of the site with a pilot excavation in the granary. Excavations undertaken by Israeli archaeologists headed by Raphael Greenberg from Tel Aviv University's Institute of Archaeology in 2010 confirmed that the fortified compound was in fact the Arab Islamic palatial complex of al-Sinnabra.

== See also ==
- Cities of the ancient Near East
- Khirbet Kerak ware
- Tarichaea
- Tel Yarmuth
