= Guy Baruch =

Jewellery designer

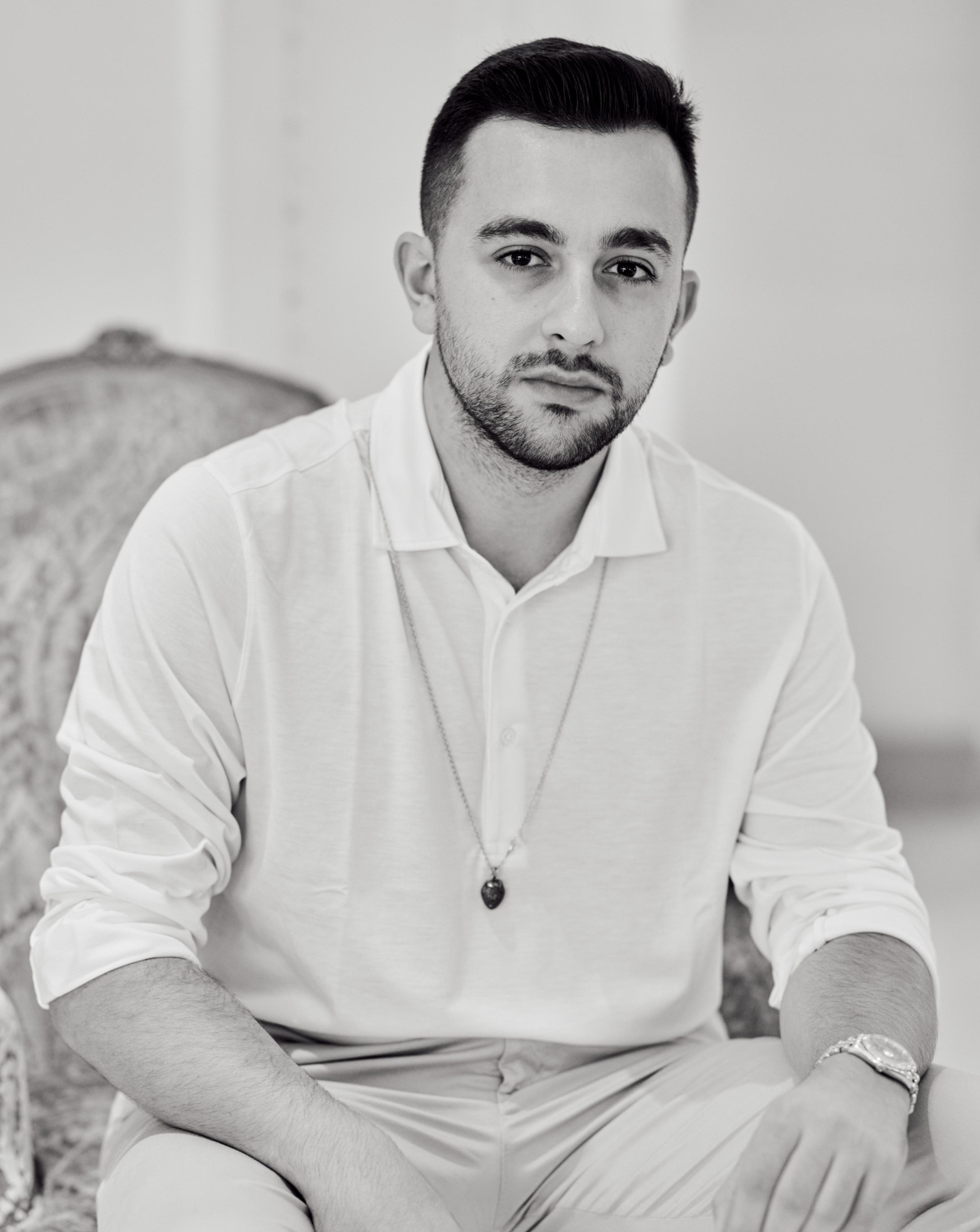
- Born: Israel
- Education: Haute École de Joaillerie (Paris)
- Occupation: Jewellery designer

Guy Baruch is an Israeli-born high jewelry designer based in Paris, France. Known for producing a limited number of bespoke creations each year, he works primarily with rare gemstones and precious metals for a clientele that includes private collectors, public figures, and members of royal families. His work is associated with both Paris and Monaco, where he regularly presents new designs.

== Biography ==
=== Early life and education ===
Baruch was born in Israel and developed an interest in jewelry design during his teenage years. At age 17, he moved to Paris to study at the Haute École de Joaillerie, a specialist institution for jewelry arts.

=== Career ===
Following his graduation, Baruch began working at Cartier as a high jewelry designer. After approximately one year, he left the company to establish his own independent practice.

Baruch's design studio operates without a public boutique, and he meets clients privately. He produces no more than thirty pieces annually, each made to order. His creations are entirely handcrafted and often incorporate exceptionally rare stones.

In Paris, Baruch's workshop is located near Place Vendôme, historically associated with high jewelry houses. He also maintains professional ties to Monaco, where he organizes private showings at venues such as the Hôtel Hermitage or the Yacht Club de Monaco. Elements of Monegasque culture and architecture, such as the Grimaldi coat of arms and Port Hercules, are occasionally reflected in his designs. Baruch has also contributed pieces to charity events and cultural initiatives in the Principality.

== Style and notable works ==
Baruch's designs are known for intricate craftsmanship, limited production, and the use of high-quality gemstones. One of his recurring motifs is the Fleur-de-lis, reinterpreted in various combinations of diamonds, colored gemstones, and platinum. Each interpretation centers around a principal stone, such as a Colombian emerald or a Paraíba tourmaline.

== Reception ==
French and international media have compared Baruch's work to that of Joel Arthur Rosenthal. Forbes France and other lifestyle outlets have profiled his career, noting his emphasis on discretion and craftsmanship. In 2024, he was appointed a Knight of the Order of Saints Maurice and Lazarus in Italy. In 2025, Forbes Israel named him to its 30 Under 30 list, recognizing entrepreneurs under the age of 30 who have distinguished themselves in their fields.
