= Menorah: Worship, History, Legend =

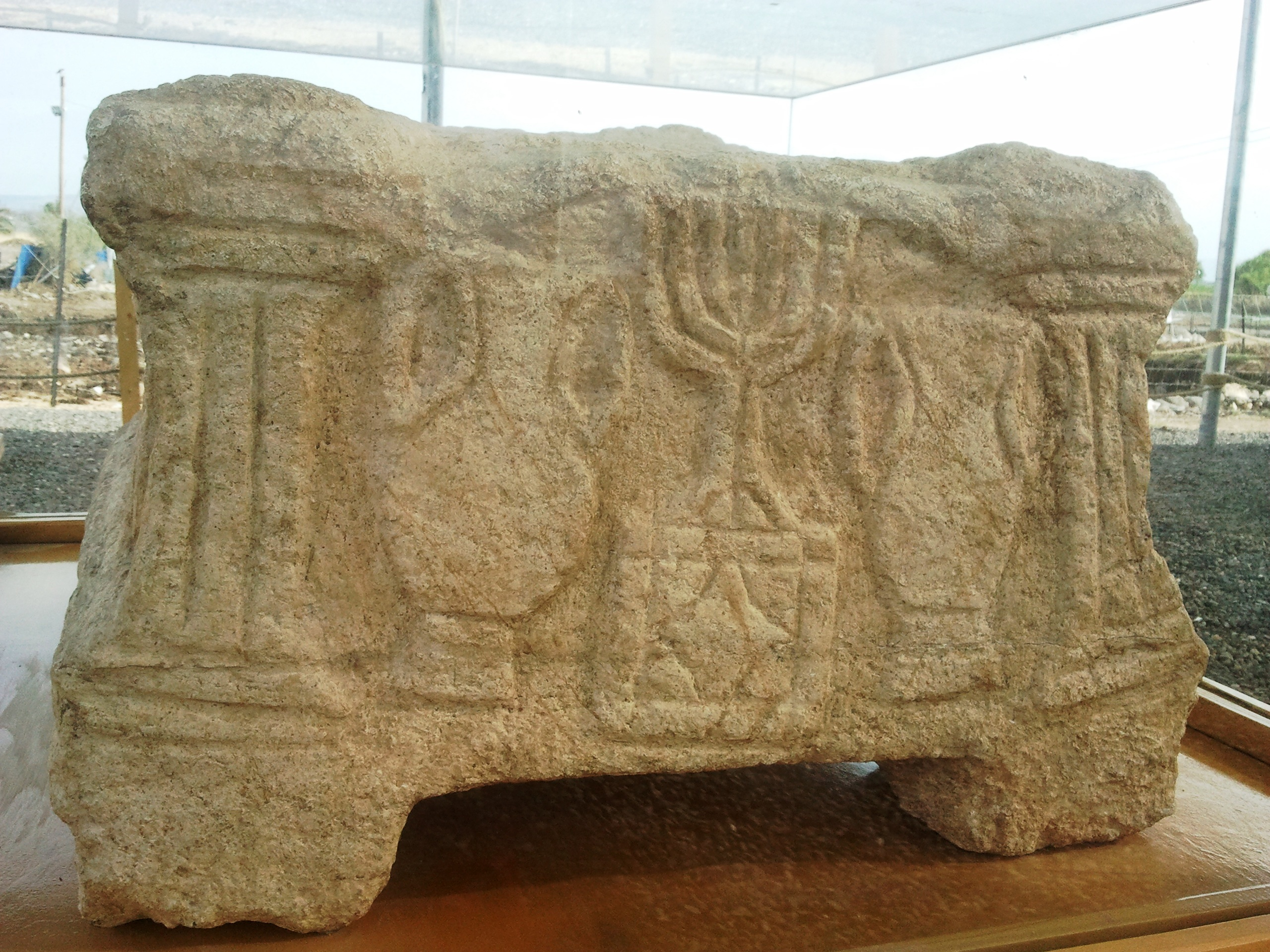
Magdala stone

"Menorah: Worship, History, Legend" is a 2017 museum exhibition sponsored jointly by the Vatican Museums and the Jewish Museum of Rome.

== Context ==
Menorah refers both to the Menorah with eight candleholders and a ninth to hold the "servant" candle used on the Jewish holiday of Chanukah, and to the large, 7-branched solid gold Menorah used in the ancient Jewish Temple in Jerusalem. The original gold menorah from the Jewish Temple in Jerusalem is not on display.

== Exhibition ==
The exhibition features 130 objects, including menorahs and images of menorahs, loaned by 20 museums, including the Louvre and the National Gallery in London. It ran from 15 May through 23 July 2017.

=== Major artifacts in exhibition ===
- Magdala stone. The exhibition marks the first time that the Magdala Stone, discovered during a 2009 archaeological dig, has left Israel.
- Menorah designed by Joel Arthur Rosenthal. The sole work commissioned for this exhibition, it is the only piece of Jewish ceremonial art that Rosenthal has ever produced.
