= Migdal Synagogue =

Ancient former synagogue of Magdala, Galilee, Israel

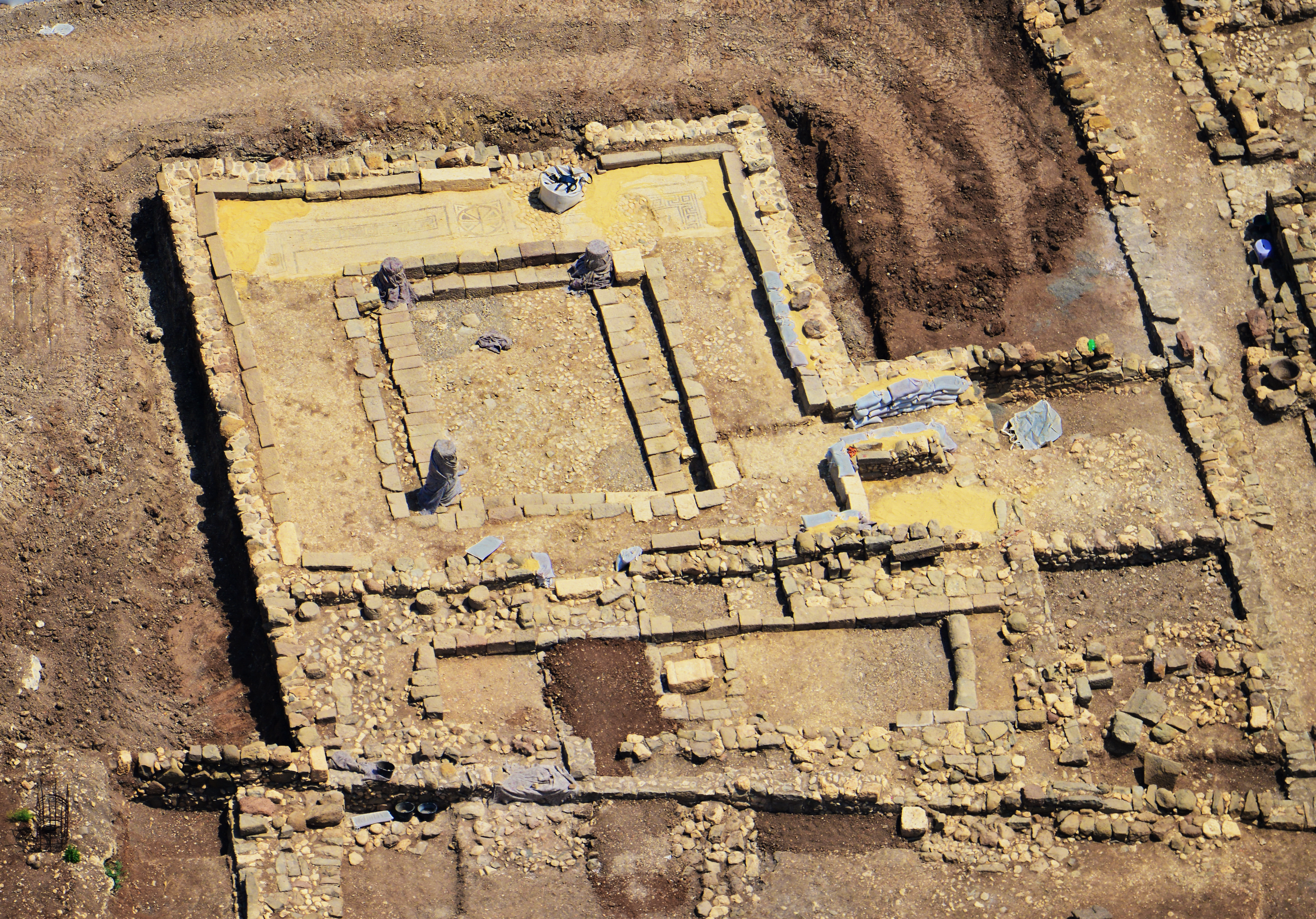
- Ruins of the ancient former synagogue in 2013

- Location of the former ancient synagogue in northeastern Israel

Religion
- Affiliation: Judaism (former)
- Ecclesiastical or organizational status: Synagogue; Archeological site
- Status: Abandoned
- Public access: Yes

Location
- Location: Magdala, Galilee, Northern Israel
- Country: Israel
- Interactive map of Migdal Synagogue
- Coordinates: 32°49′30″N 35°30′56″E

Specifications
- Site area: 120 m^{2} (1,300 sq ft)
- Materials: Stone

The Migdal Synagogue or Magdala Synagogue is an ancient former Jewish synagogue, discovered at the ancient city of Magdala, close to the shore of the Sea of Galilee, in northeastern Israel. It is one of few ancient former synagogues that were in use in the Second Temple period, which places them among the oldest synagogues found in Israel.

Inside the synagogue first discovered at Migdal, the Magdala stone was found representing the Menorah, the seven-branched candelabrum that was located in the Second Temple. It's the oldest such representation in a Jewish context and one that appears to have been made by an individual who had seen the Menorah in the Temple.

== Background: Magdala ==
Magdala was a fishing town that was mentioned in Jewish documents of the period as a major site during the First Jewish–Roman War (66–73 CE) at the time of the destruction of the Second Temple in 70 CE and is also mentioned in early Christian texts as the home community of Mary Magdalene. In addition, the location is prominently featured in the Jewish-Roman historian Josephus’ writings.

== 2009 synagogue discovery ==
The first synagogue was discovered in 2009 during a salvage dig conducted by Dr. Dina Avshalom-Gorni of the Israel Antiquities Authority at the location of a new hotel at Migdal Beach, the site of ancient Magdala.

The synagogue covers approximately 120 square metres (1,300 sq ft). As in other ancient synagogues, it has stone benches built against the walls. The walls were decorated with elaborately designed and colored frescos and the floor is partially made of mosaics. The Migdal site is just one of seven synagogues known to date back to the Second Temple period, with the relative scarcity of such houses of worship explained by the prevailing religious practice of making pilgrimages to the Temple in Jerusalem for the Three Pilgrimage Festivals of Passover, Shavuot and Sukkot as the primary form of worship at the time.

A representative of the company developing the hotel expressed the firm's delight at the find, which it hopes to integrate into a visitor center that would attract tourists of all faiths from Israel and from around the world. The architect of the project redesigned the complex to accommodate the antiquities and the synagogue to integrate it into an archaeological park open to the public.

=== Menorah image ===
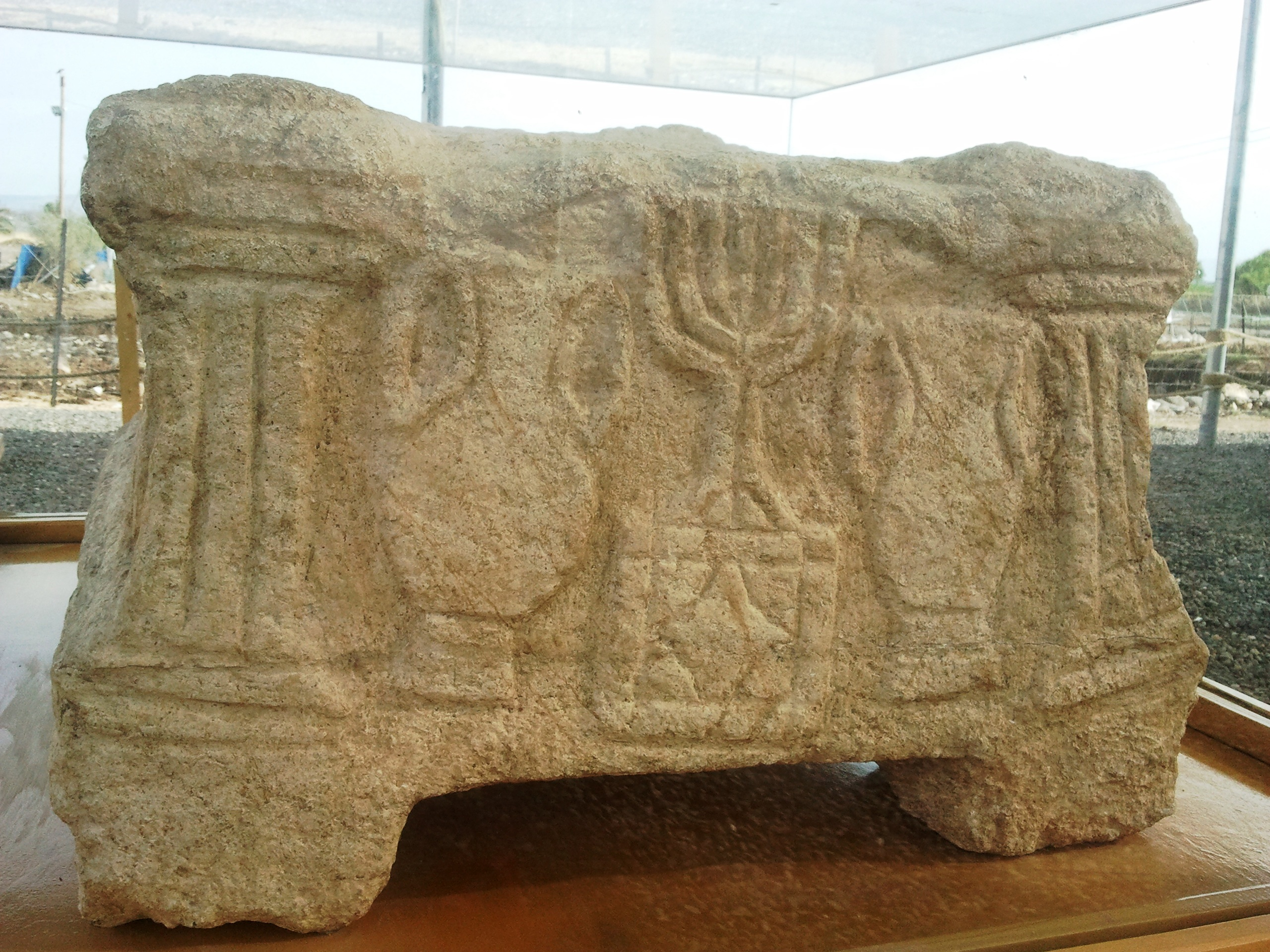
Magdala stone

The Magdala stone is a carved stone with a relief showing on one side a seven-branched menorah flanked by a pair of two-handled jugs and a pair of columns. Dr. Avshalom-Gorni called the discovery "an exciting and unique find. This is the first time that a menorah decoration has been discovered from the days when the Second Temple was still standing. This is the first menorah to be discovered in a Jewish context and that dates to the Second Temple period/beginning of the Early Roman period. We can assume that the engraving [sic, see note] that appears on the stone, which the Israel Antiquities Authority uncovered, was done by an artist who saw the seven-branched menorah with his own eyes in the Temple in Jerusalem".

== 2021 synagogue discovery ==
In December 2021, another synagogue dating from the same period was discovered in a salvage excavation at Magdala. It was shaped as a square and built in basalt and limestone. It featured a main hall and two other rooms. One of the smaller rooms featured a stone shelf, which experts suggest may have been used for storing Torah scrolls. This synagogue stood close to a residential street, while the one found in 2009 was surrounded by an ancient industrial zone.

== See also ==
- Ancient synagogues in Palestine, the region including the entire Palestine region
- Ancient synagogues in Israel, synagogues in what is now Israel
