= Magdala stone =

Carved block from archaeology site in Israel

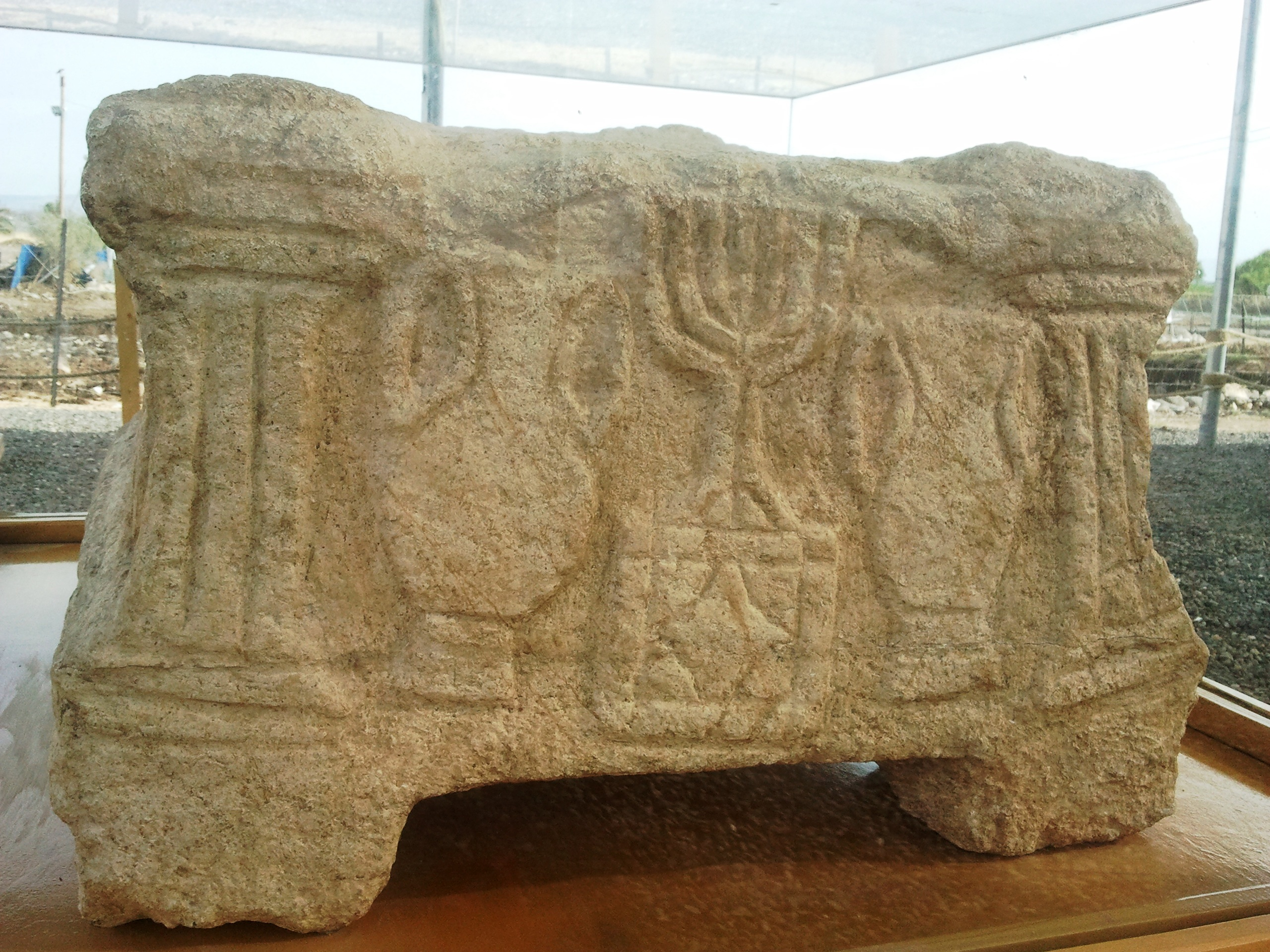
Magdala stone

The Magdala stone is a carved stone block unearthed by archaeologists in the Migdal Synagogue in Israel, dating to before the destruction of the Second Temple in Jerusalem in the year 70.

It is notable for detailed carvings depicting the Second Temple, carvings made while that Temple still stood and therefore assumed to have been made by an artist who had seen the Temple before it was destroyed by the Roman military. Some archaeologists describe the carvings as enabling a new, scholarly understanding of the synagogue conceptualized as a sacred space even during the period while the Temple was still standing. This new understanding would overturn a long-held scholarly consensus that during the period when the Temple still stood, synagogues were merely assembly and study halls, places where the Torah and other sacred books were read aloud and studied, but not sacred spaces in their own right.

The stone is also notable for having the earliest known images of the Temple Menorah to be found in a synagogue.

== History ==
The stone was uncovered during the 2009 excavation of the Migdal Synagogue. Scholars believe that the stone was carved before the Romans destroyed the Second Temple in 70 CE.

In 2017, the stone was displayed in Rome in Menorah: Worship, History, Legend, an exhibition jointly sponsored by the Vatican and the Jewish Museum of Rome.

== Carvings ==
The stone is approximately 0.6 m. (24 in.) long, circa 0.5 m. (20 in.) wide and stands 0.4 m. (18 in.) high.

The facade of the stone, on the side that faces Jerusalem, features an arch supported by a pair of pillars. Within the arch a seven-branched menorah sits atop what appears to be a pedestal, flanked by a pair of two-handled jugs which may be sitting on some sort of stands. Dr. Avshalom-Gorni called the discovery "an exciting and unique find." This may be the oldest depiction of a menorah decoration and is the first menorah to be discovered in a Jewish context that dates to the Second Temple period and the beginning of the Early Roman era, the period when the Temple was still standing. "We can assume that the engraving that appears on the stone, which the Israel Antiquities Authority uncovered, was done by an artist who saw the seven-branched menorah with his own eyes in the Temple in Jerusalem".

However, Mordechai Aviam interprets the object beneath the menorah as an image of the Gold Altar (Inner Altar) that stood in front of the Menorah inside the ancient Temple.

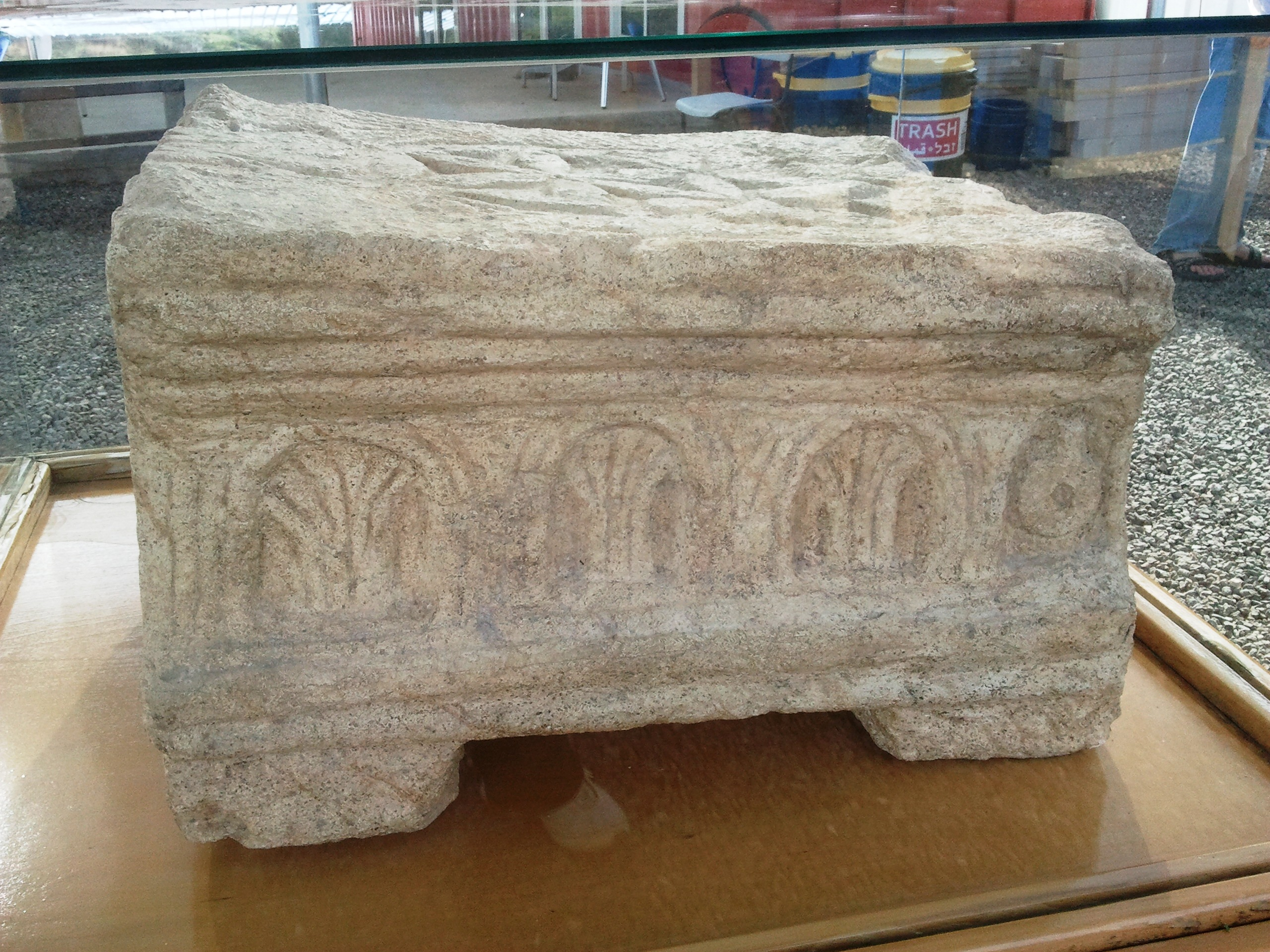
Side panel of Magdala stone

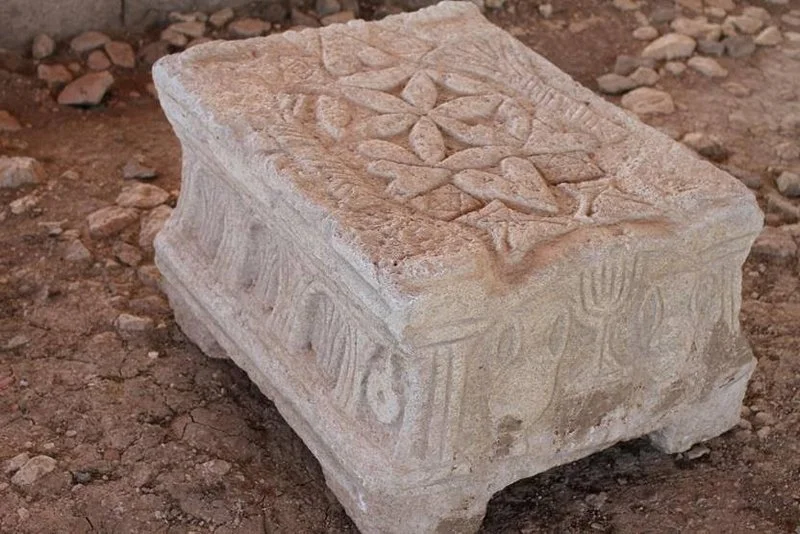
Top view of the Magdala stone

The stone's side panels are identical; each shows an arcade of four arches. Interpretations of the carvings vary. While some have interpreted the sides as showing three arches filled with sheaves of grain (probably wheat), and a fourth with a hanging object thought to be an oil lamp, others, including Rina Talgam and Mordechai Aviam see it as an architectural image. According to Aviam it shows an arcade through which is seen a second arcade of arches which the viewer is meant to understand as the entrance arches of the Holy of Holies.

== Placement in the synagogue at Migdal ==
The stone stood in the center of the Migdal Synagogue, and is tall enough to have been used as a reading desk or podium by someone in a seated position.

Adi Erlich suggested that "the local Jews saw Jerusalem as their religious center, and their local activities took place under this centrality". Rina Talgam, a professor specializing in the art of the ancient Near East at the Hebrew University of Jerusalem and the leading scholar of this stone, understands the Magdala Stone as a depiction of the Temple and the implements used in worship, including a depiction of the Holy of Holies by an artist who had actually seen the Temple and was familiar with the Holy of Holies. She understands the stone as intended to lend to this synagogue a sacred aura, making it, "like a lesser Temple", for use in the Galilee, which was a long journey from Jerusalem under the conditions of that pedestrian era, when most people traveled by foot.

Other scholars of the period, including Elchanan Reiner, professor of Jewish history at Tel Aviv University, share her view.

=== The "Horvat Kur stone" ===
A similar size stone was found in a Byzantine-period synagogue in a dig at nearby Horvat Kur; it is also carved with images of the Temple. The "Horvat Kur stone", also discovered by Kinneret Regional Project archaeologists, was found in secondary use in the synagogue floor. It is a rectangular table with four short legs, carved out of a block of basalt and weighing about 350 kilograms (770 lb), decorated with Jewish symbols like vessels, a ladle, and two candelabra. As of 2021, nine years after its discovery, its initial provenance and exact purpose and significance could not yet be determined.

== Site ==
The original stone has been removed for safekeeping; a replica is displayed in the ancient synagogue at Magdala, an archaeological site open to the public.
