= Temple menorah =

Ancient Hebrew ritual candelabrum and Jewish symbol

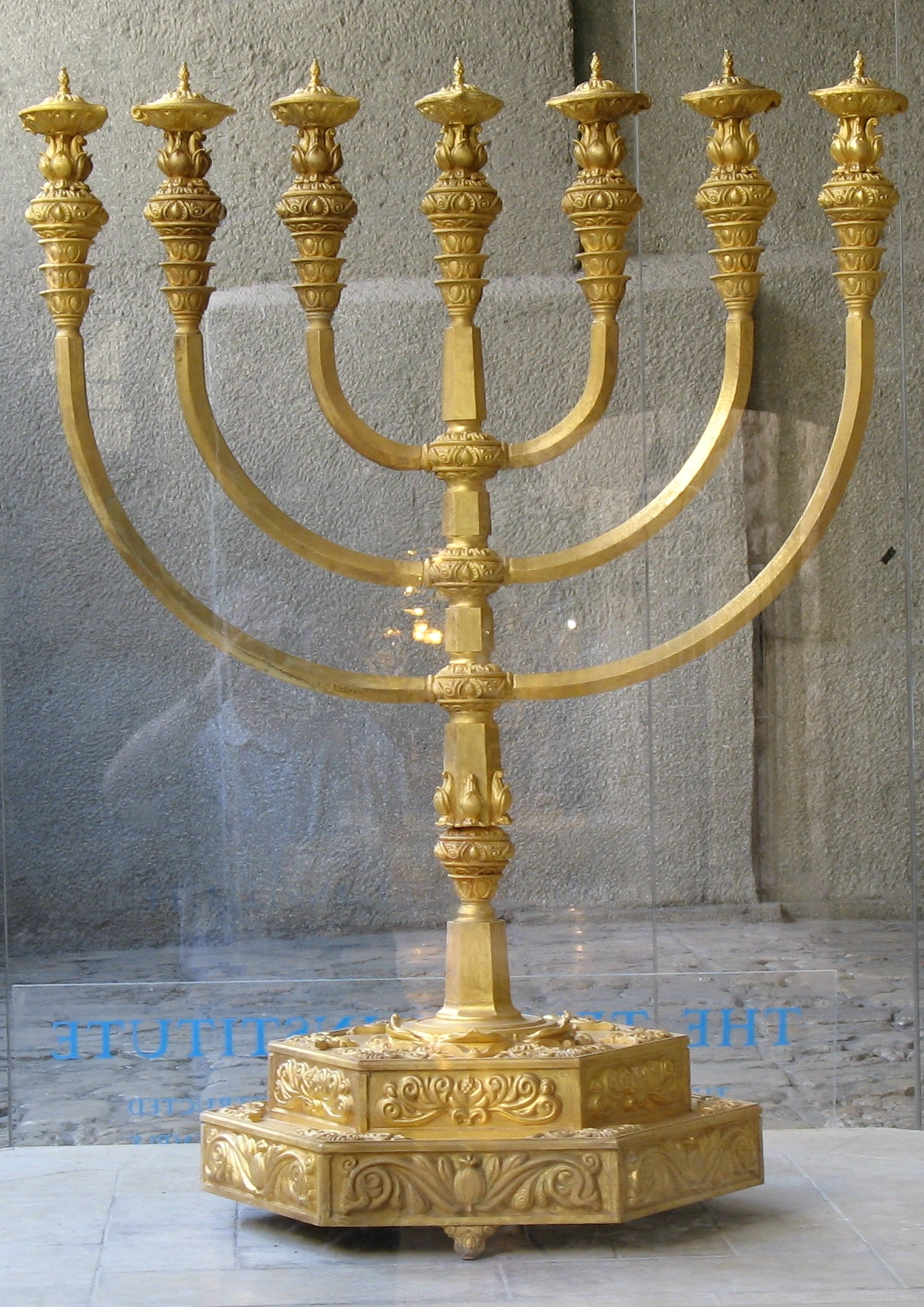
A reconstruction of the menorah of the Temple in Jerusalem, manufactured by the Temple Institute.

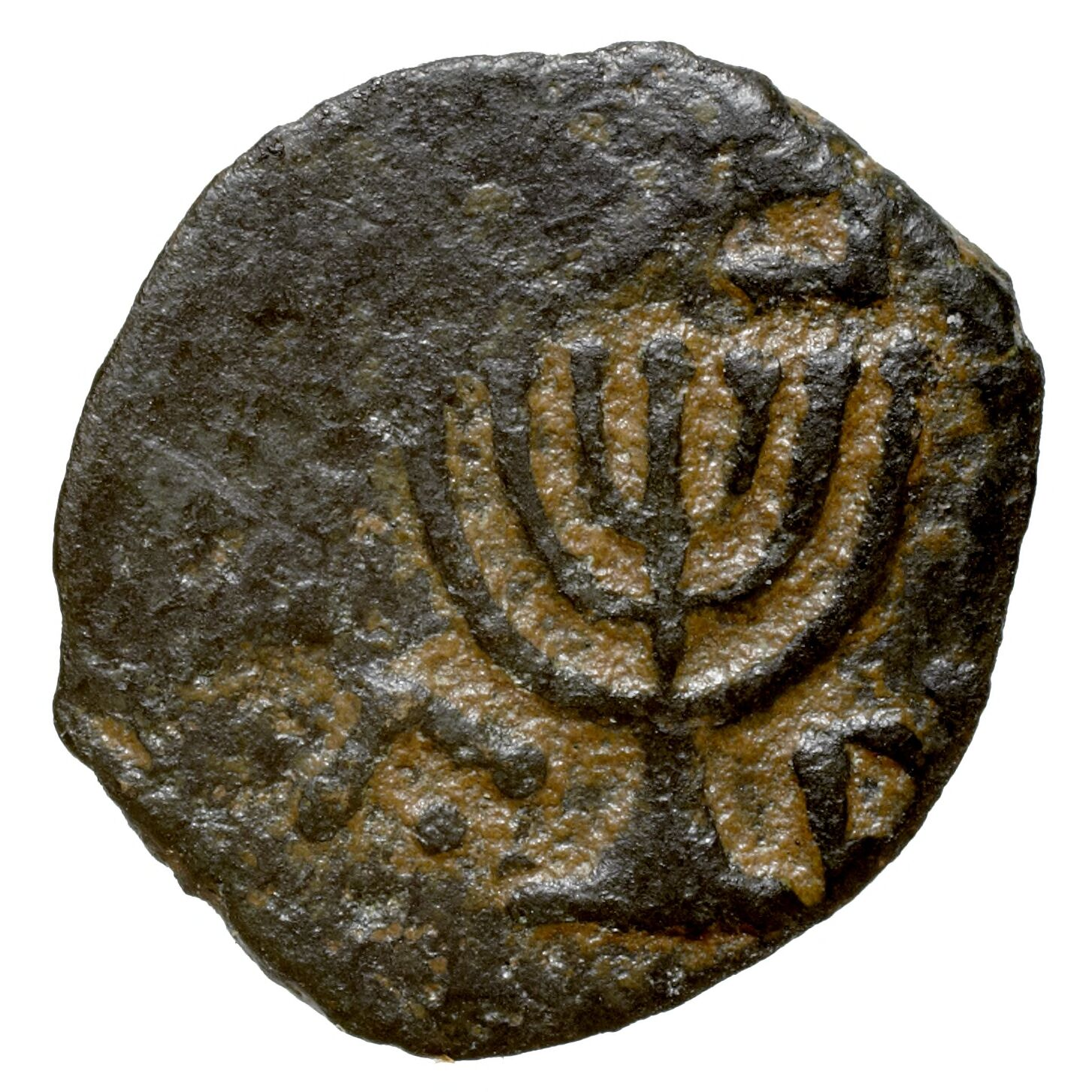
Early representation of the menorah, on a coin coined by Antigonus II Mattathias, the last Hasmonean king of Judea (r. 40–37 BCE)

The Temple menorah (/məˈnɔːrə/; Biblical Hebrew: מְנוֹרָה, romanized: mənorā, Tiberian Hebrew: [/ˌmənoːˈʀɔː/]) is a seven-branched candelabrum that is described in the Hebrew Bible and later ancient sources as having been used in the Tabernacle and the Temple in Jerusalem.

Since ancient times, it has served as a symbol representing the Jews and Judaism in both the Land of Israel and the Jewish diaspora. It became the State of Israel's official emblem when it was founded in 1948.

According to the Hebrew Bible, the menorah was made out of pure gold, and the only source of fuel that was allowed to be used to light the lamps was fresh olive oil. The menorah was placed in the Tabernacle. Biblical tradition holds that Solomon's Temple was home to ten menorahs, which were later plundered by the Babylonians; the Second Temple is also said to have been home to a menorah. Following the Roman destruction of Jerusalem and the Temple in 70 CE, the menorah was taken to Rome; the Arch of Titus, which still stands, depicts the menorah being carried away by the triumphant Romans along with other spoils of the destroyed temple. The menorah was reportedly taken to Carthage by the Vandals after the sacking of Rome in 455. Byzantine historian Procopius reported that the Byzantine army recovered it in 533 and brought it to Constantinople, then later returned it to Jerusalem. Many other theories have been advanced for its eventual fate, and no clear evidence of its location has been recorded since late antiquity.

The menorah is frequently used as a symbol in Jewish art. There are no representations of the menorah from the First Temple period, but some examples dating from the Second Temple period have been recorded. Menorah images that were discovered include the coins of Antigonus II Mattathias, the last Hasmonean king of Judea, as well as on the walls of an Upper City mansion and Jason's Tomb in Jerusalem, and objects such as the Magdala stone. Following the destruction of the Second Temple, the menorah came to be recognized as a distinctively Jewish symbol and was depicted on tomb walls, synagogue floors, sculptures and reliefs, as well as glass and metal objects. The menorah has been also used since then to distinguish synagogues and Jewish cemeteries from the places of worship and cemeteries of Christians and pagans. The symbol has also been found in several archaeological artifacts from ancient Samaritan, Christian and Islamic communities. The Hanukkah menorah, a nine-branched variant of the menorah, is closely associated with the Jewish festival of Hanukkah.

== Construction and appearance ==
=== Hebrew Bible ===
The Book of Exodus of the Hebrew Bible states that God revealed the design for the menorah to Moses and describes the construction of the menorah as follows:

^{31}Make a lampstand of pure gold. Hammer out its base and shaft, and make its flowerlike cups, buds and blossoms of one piece with them. ^{32}Six branches are to extend from the sides of the lampstand—three on one side and three on the other. ^{33}Three cups shaped like almond flowers with buds and blossoms are to be on one branch, three on the next branch, and the same for all six branches extending from the lampstand. ^{34}And on the lampstand are to be four cups shaped like almond flowers with buds and blossoms. ^{35}One bud shall be under the first pair of branches extending from the lampstand, a second bud under the second pair, and a third bud under the third pair—six branches in all. ^{36}The buds and branches shall be all of one piece with the lampstand, hammered out of pure gold.

^{37}Then make its seven lamps and set them up on it so that they light the space in front of it. ^{38}Its wick trimmers and trays are to be of pure gold. ^{39}A talent of pure gold is to be used for the lampstand and all these accessories. ^{40}See that you make them according to the pattern shown you on the mountain.

The Book of Numbers (Chapter 8) adds that the seven lamps are to give light in front of the lampstand and reiterates that the lampstand was made in accordance with the pattern shown to Moses on the mountain.

=== In other sources ===
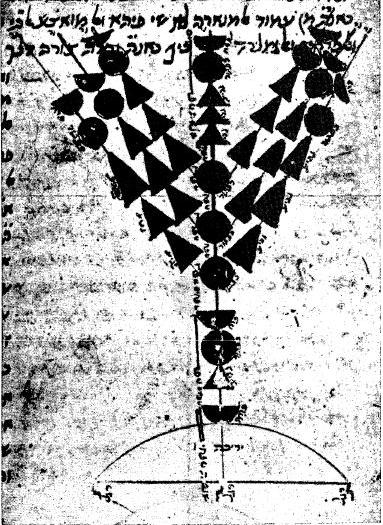
Maimonides' drawing of the menorah

Rabbinic sources teach that the menorah stood 18 handbreadths/palms (three common cubits) high, or approximately 1.62 metres (5.3 ft). Although the menorah was placed in the antechamber of the Temple sanctuary, over against its southernmost wall, the Talmud (Menahot 98b) brings down a dispute between two scholars on whether or not the menorah was situated north to south, or east to west. The branches are often artistically depicted as semicircular, but Rashi, (according to some contemporary readings) and Maimonides (in a sketch commented on by his son Avraham), held that they were straight; all other Jewish authorities, both classical (e.g. Philo and Josephus) and medieval (e.g. Ibn Ezra), who express an opinion on the subject state that the arms were round.

The Roman-Jewish historian Josephus, who witnessed the Temple's destruction, says that the menorah was actually situated obliquely, to the east and south.

Chabad Lubavitch Rabbi Menachem Mendel Schneerson viewed the drawing by Maimonides as definitive and, accordingly, Chabad synagogues use menorahs with straight branches in its synagogues around the world and, as well as in large Chanukah menorahs it erects in outdoor public displays. However, critics argue that Maimonides' design was meant to be schematic rather than pictorial and that other ancient sources depict menorahs with rounded arms.

==== Arch of Titus ====
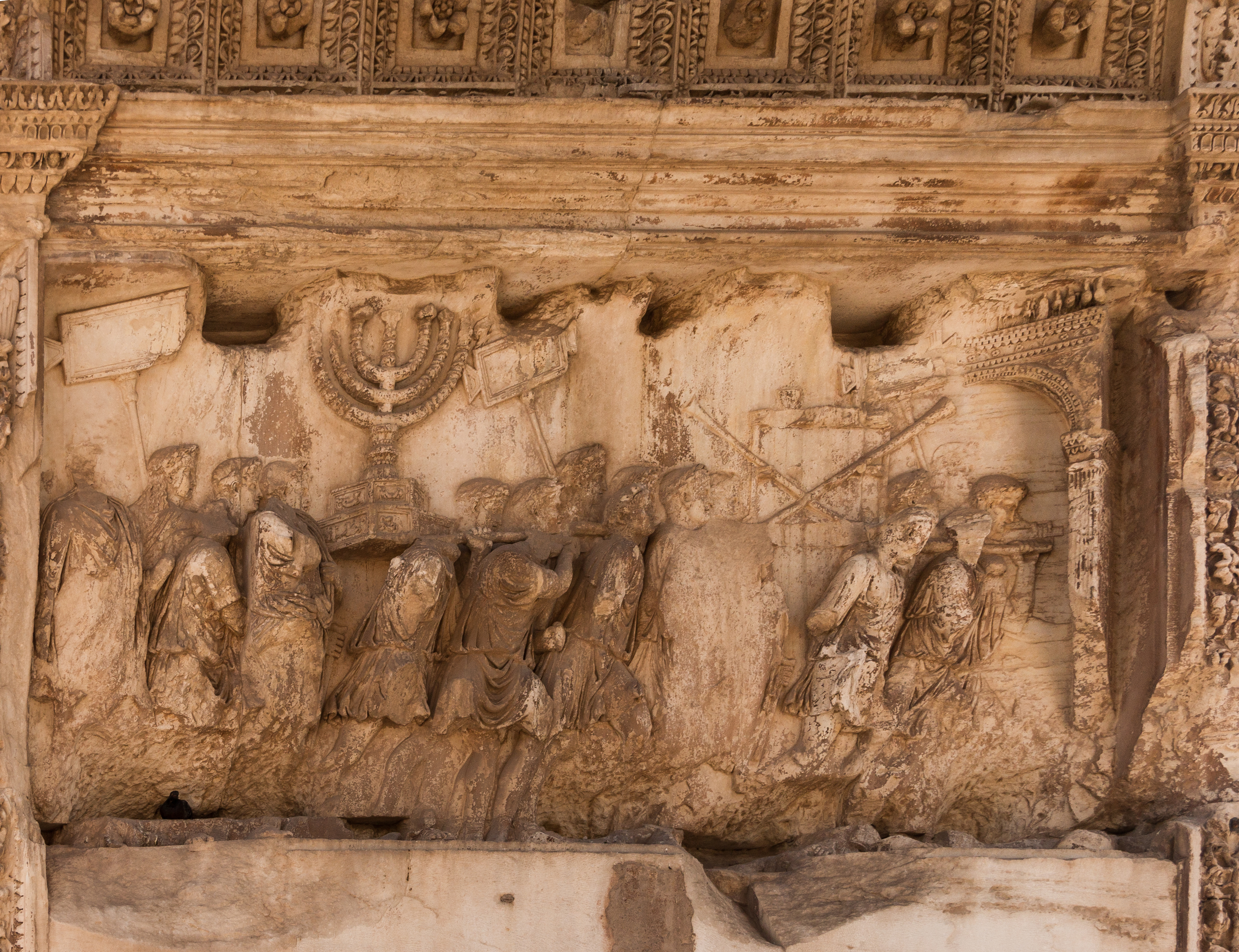
Depiction of the menorah on the Arch of Titus in Rome

The most famous preserved representation of the menorah of the Second Temple was depicted in a frieze on the Arch of Titus, commemorating his triumphal parade in Rome following the destruction of Jerusalem in the year 70 CE. In that frieze, the menorah is shown resting upon a hexagonal base, which in turn rests upon a slightly larger but concentric and identically shaped base; a stepwise appearance on all sides is thus produced. Each facet of the hexagonal base was made with two vertical stiles and two horizontal rails, a top rail and a bottom rail, resembling a protruding frame set against a sunken panel. These panels have some relief design set or sculpted within them.

==== Magdala Stone ====
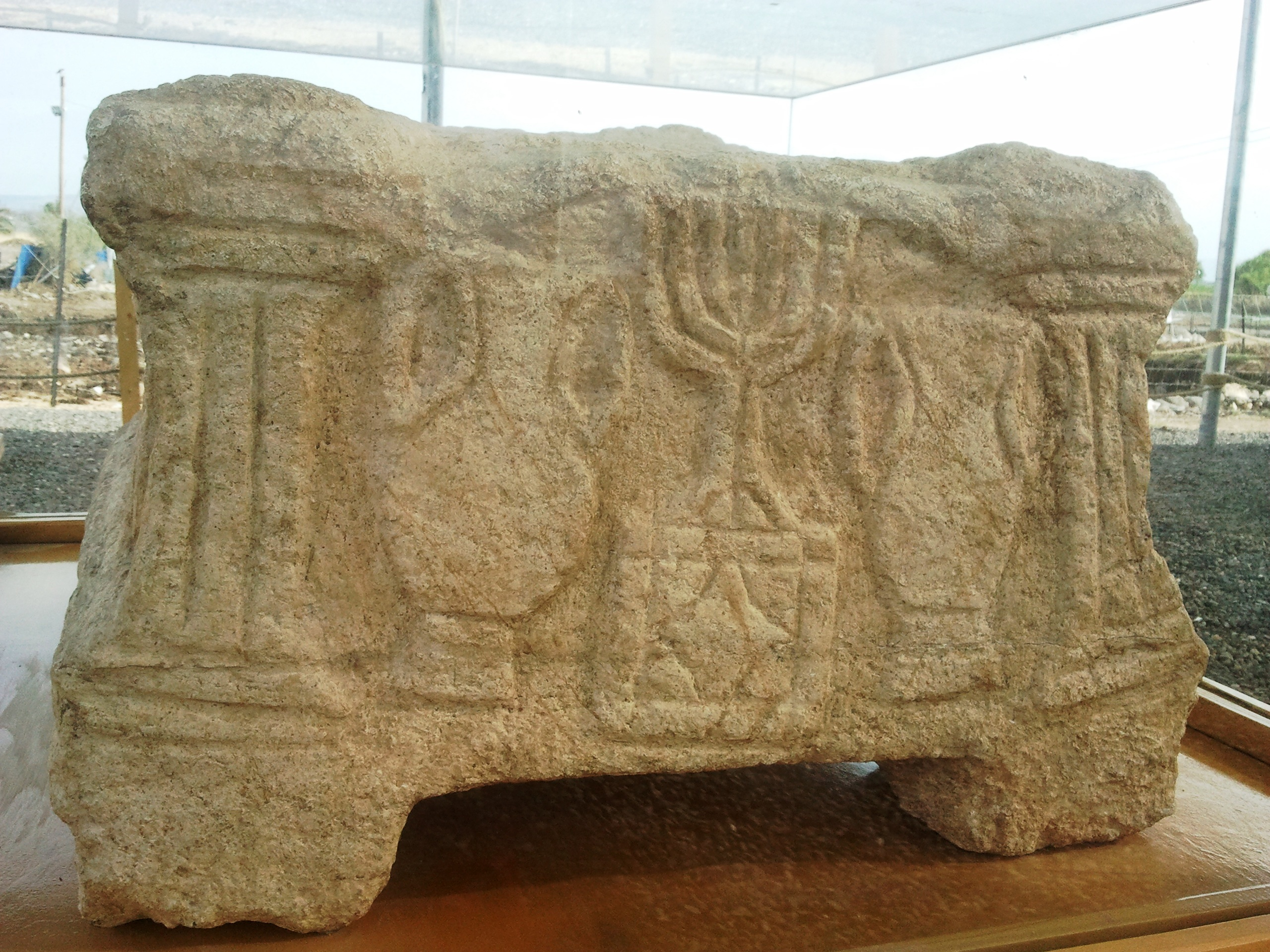
Stone with menorah that was found in the archaeological site Magdala

In 2009, the ruins of a synagogue in Magdala with pottery dating from before the destruction of the Second Temple were discovered under land owned by the Legionaries of Christ, who had intended to construct a center for women's studies. Inside that synagogue's ruins, a carved stone block was discovered, which had on its surface, among other ornate carvings, a depiction of the seven-lamp menorah differing markedly from the depiction on the Arch of Titus, which could possibly have been carved by an eyewitness to the actual menorah present at the time in the Temple at Jerusalem. This menorah has arms which are polygonal, not rounded, and the base is not graduated but triangular. It is notable, however, that this artifact was found a significant distance from Jerusalem and the Arch of Titus has often been interpreted as an eyewitness account of the original menorah being looted from the temple in Jerusalem.

== Usage ==
According to the Book of Exodus, the lamps of the menorah were lit daily from fresh, consecrated olive oil and burned from evening until morning.

Josephus states that three of the seven lamps were allowed to burn during the day also; however, according to one opinion in the Talmud, only the center lamp was left burning all day, into which as much oil was put as into the others. Although all the other lights were extinguished, that light continued burning oil, in spite of the fact that it had been kindled first. This miracle, according to the Talmud, was taken as a sign that the Shechinah rested among Israel. It was called the ner hama'aravi (Western lamp) because of the direction of its wick. This lamp was also referred to as the ner Elohim (lamp of God), mentioned in I Samuel 3:3. According to the Talmud, the miracle of the ner hama'aravi ended after the High Priesthood of Simon the Just in the 3rd or 4th century BC.

Contrary to some modern designs, the ancient menorah burned oil and did not contain anything resembling candles, which were unknown in the Middle East until about 400 CE.

== History ==
=== Tabernacle ===
The original menorah was made for the tabernacle, and the Bible records it as being present until the Israelites crossed the Jordan River. When the tabernacle tent was pitched in Shiloh, it is assumed that the menorah was also present. However, no mention is made of it during the years that the Ark of the Covenant was moved in the times of Samuel and Saul.

Benjamin D. Sommer suggested that while the Holy of Holies in the tabernacle was reserved for God's presence, the main room featured a metal menorah with six branches on each side, potentially echoing the asherah, a sacred tree or pole. However, Rachel Hachili argued that theories positing that the menorah had its roots in some kind of sacred tree or plant have several problems.

=== Solomon's Temple ===
According to 2 Kings and the Books of Chronicles, Solomon created ten lampstands ("menorahs") that were put in the heikhal, Solomon's Temple main chamber. The weight of the lampstands forms part of the detailed instructions given to Solomon by David. According to the Book of Jeremiah, the lampstands were taken away by the Babylonian general Nebuzaradan following the destruction of Jerusalem.

=== Second Temple ===
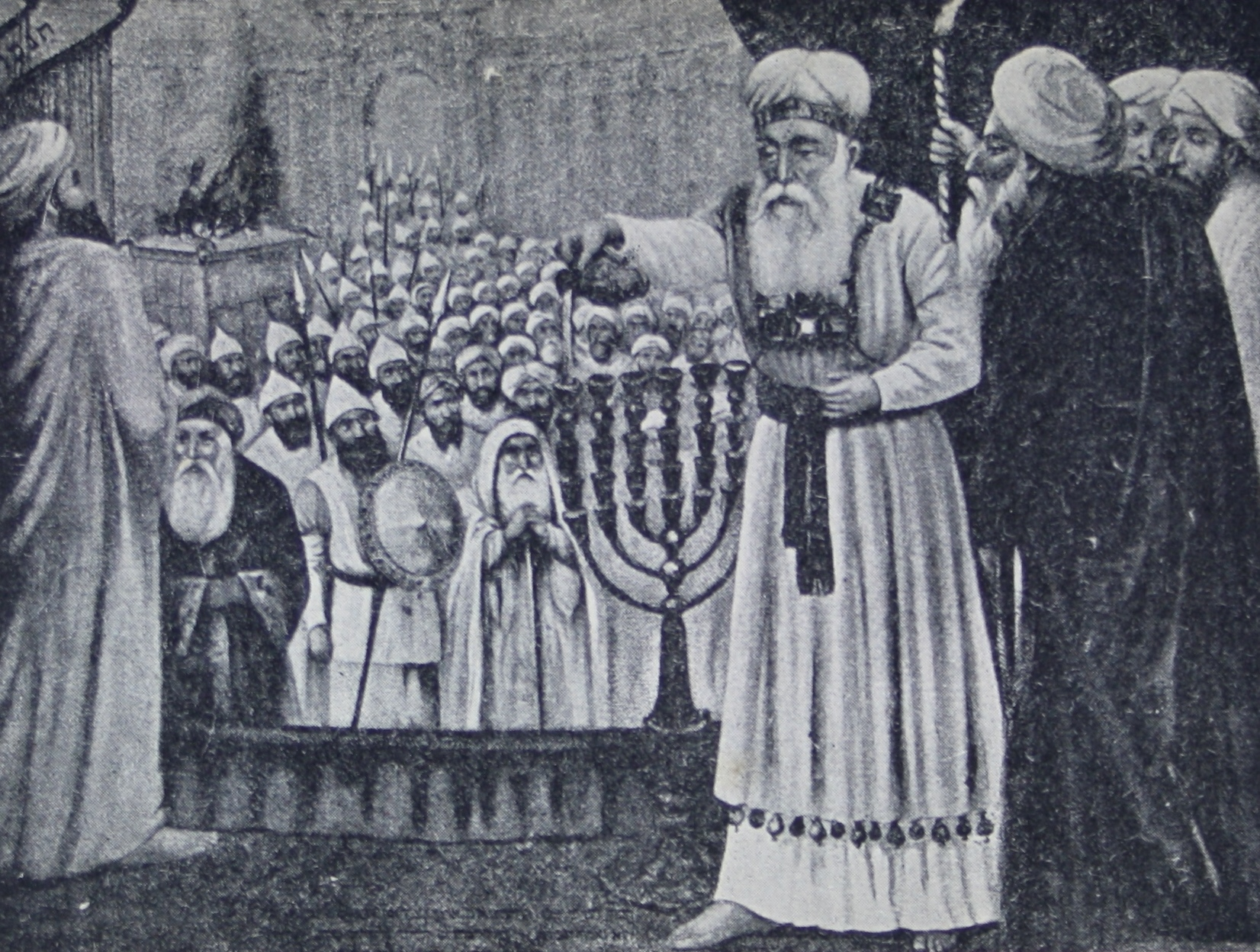
High Priest pouring oil over the menorah, Jewish new year card

During the construction of the Second Temple following the Return to Zion, no mention is made of the return of the menorah but only of "vessels." The book of Maccabees records that Antiochus IV took away the lampstands (plural) when he pillaged the Temple. The later record of the making of "new holy vessels" may refer to the manufacture of new lampstands. According to the Talmud, the returning Hasmoneans were poor and forced to construct the Menorah out of wood. They later upgraded it to silver and ultimately gold.

Yonatan Adler argued in The Origins of Judaism (2022) that no extrabiblical evidence exists for a seven-branch menorah in the Jerusalem temple prior to the late Hasmonean period, in the mid-1st century BCE.

=== Rome ===
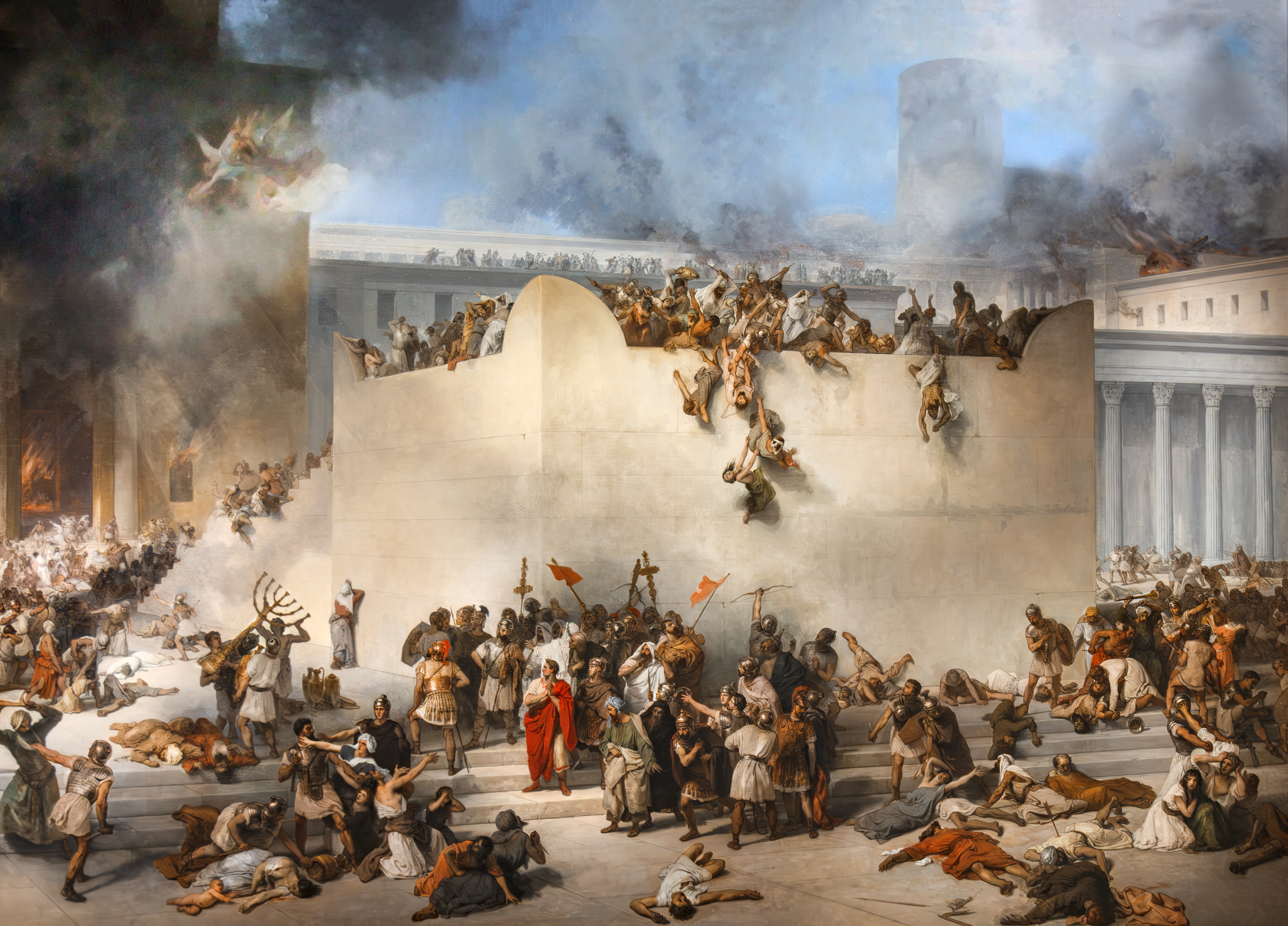
The Destruction of the Temple of Jerusalem by Francesco Hayez. The menorah is carried away by Roman soldiers, on the bottom-left corner. Oil on canvas, 1867.

The menorah from the Second Temple was carried to Rome after the destruction of Jerusalem in 70 CE at the height of the First Jewish–Roman War. Its fate is recorded by Josephus, who states that it was brought to Rome and carried along during the triumph of Vespasian and Titus. The bas relief on the Arch of Titus in Rome depicts a scene of Roman soldiers carrying away the spoils of the Second Temple, including the menorah.

For centuries, the menorah and the other temple treasures were displayed as war trophies either at the Temple of Peace in Rome, or in the Imperial Palace. It was still there when the city was sacked by Vandals in 455 CE.

=== Whereabouts following the Vandal sack of Rome ===
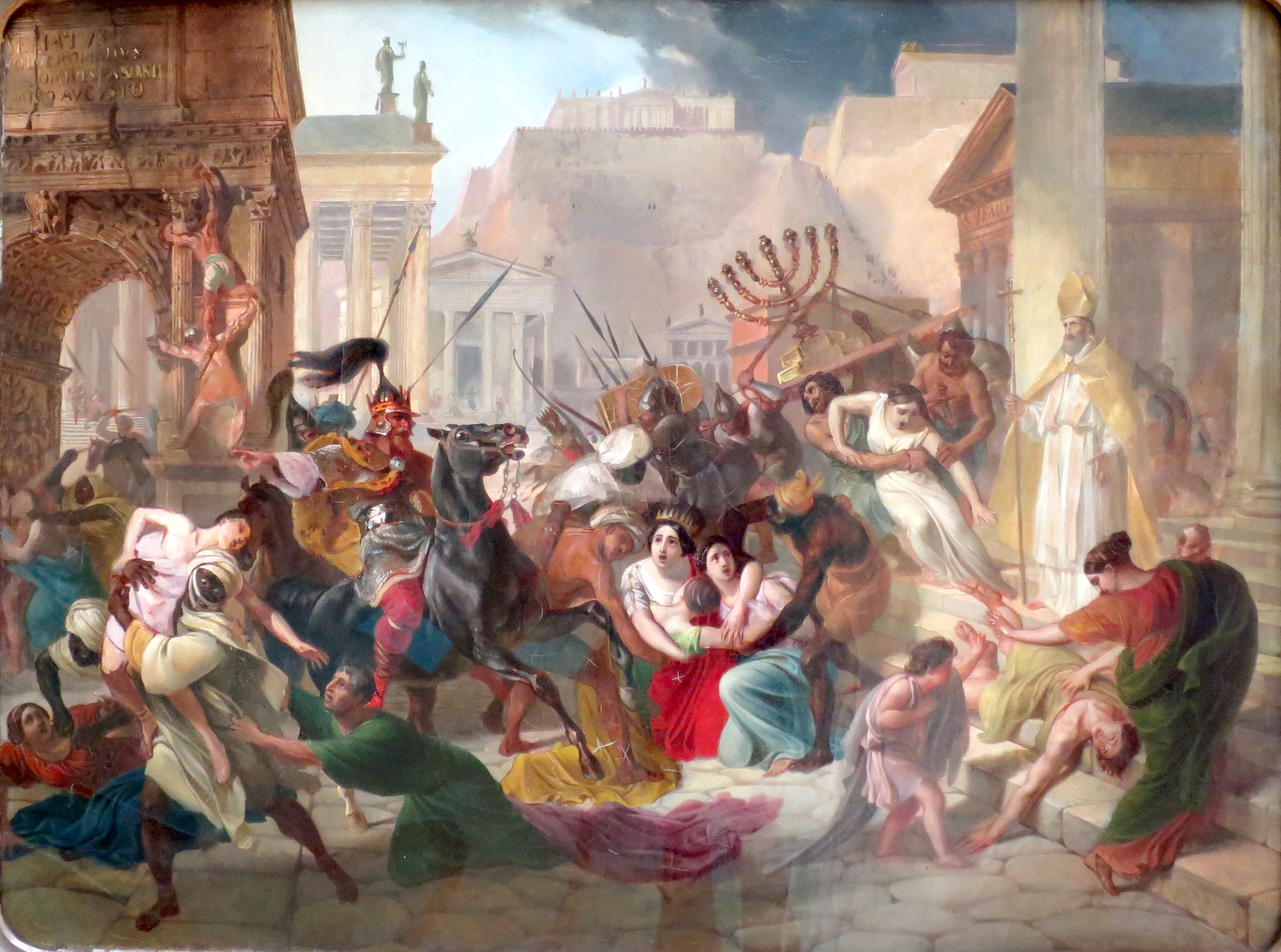
Painting on Genseric sacking Rome by Karl Bryullov (1833–1836), depicting the menorah taken away by the Vandals

The location and state of the Menorah following the Vandal sack of Rome remains a mystery. Many scholars assume that at this point the Menorah left Rome for Carthage and further destinations, but some believe that the Menorah remains in Rome to this day.

1. Many scholars consider as fact that the Menorah was carried off by the Vandals during the Sack of Rome in 455 CE, the Menorah and other assorted treasures of the Temple in Jerusalem were taken to Carthage, the capital of the Vandal Kingdom. They were still there when a Byzantine army under General Belisarius captured the city and defeated the Vandals in 533. Belisarius removed the Menorah and the other treasures and brought them to Constantinople as trophies of war. According to Procopius, the Menorah was carried through the streets of Constantinople during Belisarius' triumphal procession. Procopius adds that Justinian, prompted by superstitious fear that the treasures had been unlucky for Rome and Carthage, sent them back to Jerusalem and the "sanctuaries of the Christians" there. The Menorah was therefore placed in the Nea Church located in the vicinity of what is today the Batei Makhse Square in the Old City. However, no record exists of their arrival there, and there are no indications of pilgrimages to a shrine for the Menorah there. If the Menorah arrived in Jerusalem, it may have been destroyed when Jerusalem was pillaged by the Persians in 614, though legend suggests that it was secreted away by holy men, much as tradition purports the original Menorah was hidden before Nebuchadnezzar's invasion.
2. Legends and theories hypothesize the Menorah may have been melted down or broken into chunks of gold by conquerors, destroyed in a fire, kept at or returned to Constantinople, or lost in a shipwreck.
3. One notable tradition is that the Menorah actually never left Rome with the Vandals. Orthodox Jews often cite as evidence of this the Oral Tradition, where there is a listing of Jewish treasures, which according to Jewish oral tradition are still in Rome, as they have been for centuries. According to a popular interpretation the Vatican has kept the Menorah and the other mentioned Temple treasures hidden for centuries. Some claim that it has been kept in Vatican City, others that it is in the cellars of the Archbasilica of St. John Lateran. The above Oral Tradition is codified in the Avot of Rabbi Natan, one of the minor tractates printed with the Babylonian Talmud.
  The objects that were crafted, and then hidden away are these: the tent of meeting and the vessels contained therein, the ark and the broken tablets, the container of manna, and the flask of anointing oil, the stick of Aaron and its almonds and flowers, the priestly garments, and the garments of the anointed [high] priest.
  But, the spice-grinder of the family of Avtinas [used to make the unique incense in the Temple], the [golden] table [of the showbread], the menorah, the curtain [that partitioned the holy from the holy-of-holies], and the head-plate are still sitting in Rome.
  Filmmaker Rabbi Yoel Gold highlights the theory that the Temple Menorah is hidden within the Vatican and embellishes it with eyewitness accounts in his popular 2025 documentary "Hidden Light".

== Symbolism ==
=== Judaism ===
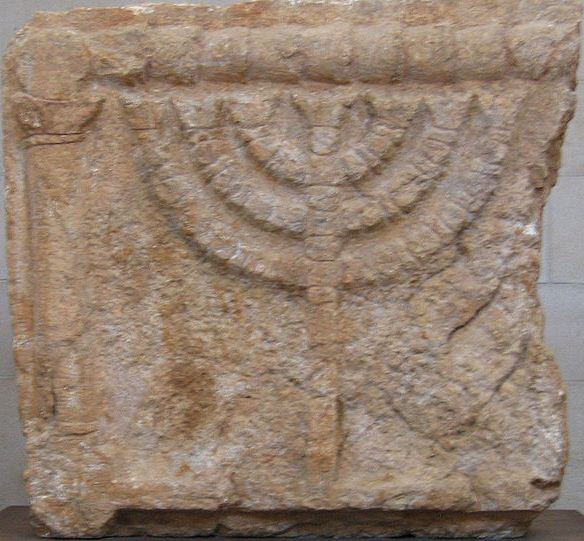
Seven-branched menorah, Eshtemoa synagogue (4th–5th century CE), Rockefeller Museum

The menorah symbolized the ideal of universal enlightenment. The idea that the menorah symbolizes wisdom is noted in the Talmud, for example, in the following: "Rabbi Isaac said: He who desires to become wise should incline to the south [when praying]. The symbol [by which to remember this] is that… the Menorah was on the southern side [of the Temple]."

The seven lamps allude to the branches of human knowledge, represented by the six lamps inclined inwards towards, and symbolically guided by, the light of God represented by the central lamp. The menorah also symbolizes the creation in seven days, with the center light representing the Sabbath.

==== Hannukah menorah ====
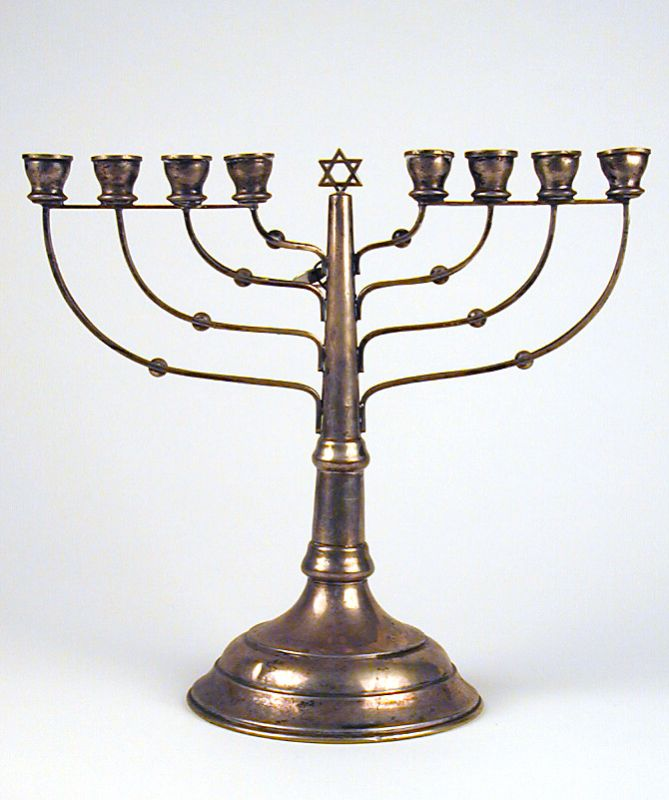
19th century Hanukkah menorah from Austria-Hungary, Musée d'Art et d'Histoire du Judaïsme

A nine-branched menorah is also a symbol closely associated with the Jewish holiday of Hanukkah. According to the Talmud, after the Seleucid desecration of the Jewish Temple in Jerusalem, there was only enough sealed (and therefore not desecrated) consecrated olive oil left to fuel the eternal flame in the Temple for one day. Miraculously, the oil burned for eight days, which was enough time to make new pure oil.

The Talmud states that it is prohibited to use a seven-lamp menorah outside of the Temple. A Hanukkah menorah therefore has eight main branches, plus the raised ninth lamp set apart as the shamash (servant) light which is used to kindle the other lights. The word shamash was not originally a "Hanukkah word" and only became associated with the holiday in the 16th century although it first appeared in the Mishnah (c. 200 C.E.) and Talmud (c. 500 C.E.). This type of menorah is called a hanukkiah in Modern Hebrew.

==== Kabbalah and the symbol of light ====
This is alluded to in the verses: "Though I walk through the valley of the deepest darkness, I will fear no evil, because You are with me" and "because even if I have fallen, I will rise again; even if I feel in the darkness, Hashem is my light. "Let the light of Divinity perceptions descend into the depths of "darkness ", into "the valley of the deepest darkness", to illuminate the lowest, so that even that light and consciousness of Divinity reaches them, so that He can heal and correct them to return them to Him.

In Kabbalah Or Panim ("the light of the Face") is a fundamental conception for the process called Tikkun. All the Kavvanot, the spiritual measures of faith for the realization of the Kingdom of God, focus on the manifestation of the Or Panim; actually darkness is in itself a negative element, that is, it does not give the hope of obtaining complete devotion: "darkness" is like an inaccessible place, darkness conceals the depth of the gaze; in Chassidut an awakening from below is the "service" for God, i.e. the Avodah.

During the victory of the Kedushah in Hanukkah, the Kohen Gadol almost declared that divine light must triumph. When the risk of "fall" can do the loss of faith in the Jewish religion as the abyss of Israel's personal and collective identity, the Kohen Gadol thus insists for the "awakening" of the most distant souls in order to direct them with Kavanah towards the fulfillment of the Mitzvot: ...because the Torah is the light and the Mitzvah is a lamp.

=== Christianity ===
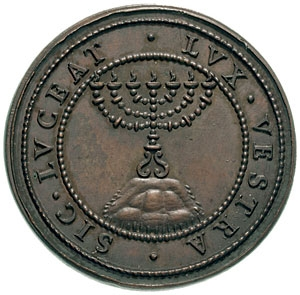
Reverse of 1590 coin in honor of Urban VII with menorah and the legend SIC·LUCEAT·LUX·VESTRA (Let your light so shine – Matt. 5:16)

The New Testament Book of Revelation refers to a mystery of seven golden lampstands representing seven churches. The messages to the seven churches from Jesus Christ found have at least four applications: (1) a local application to the specific cities and believers in the church; (2) to all the churches of all generations; (3) a prophetic application unveiling seven distinct phases of church history from the days of the apostle John until today; (4) a personal application to individual believers who have ears to hear what the Spirit is saying.

According to Clement of Alexandria and Philo Judaeus, the seven lamps of the golden menorah represented the seven classical planets in this order: the Moon, Mercury, Venus, the Sun, Mars, Jupiter, and Saturn.

It is also said to symbolize the burning bush as seen by Moses on Mount Horeb.

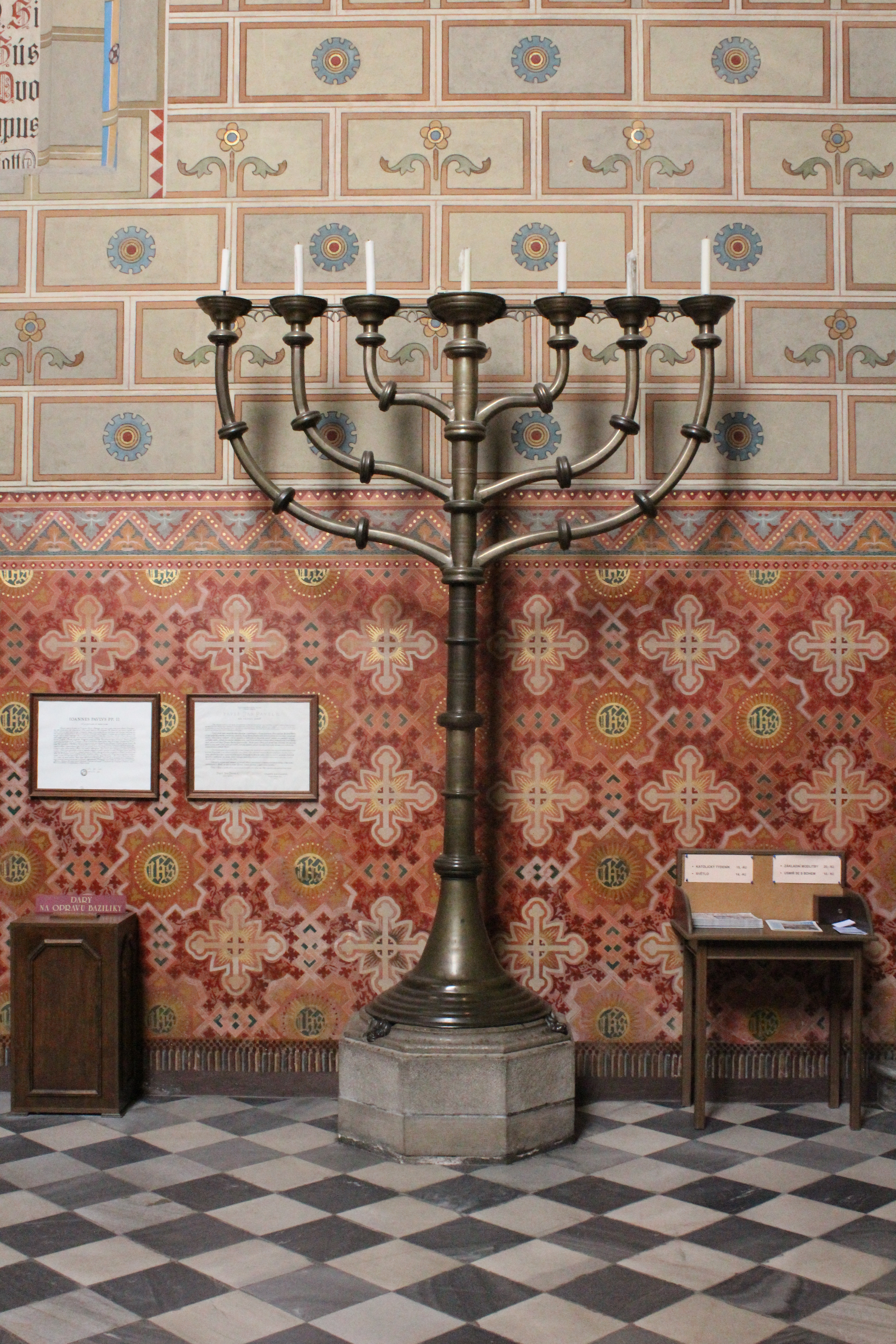
The giant menorah from the 14th century in the Basilica of the Assumption of Our Lady, Brno

Kevin Conner has noted of the original menorah, described in Exodus 25, that each of the six tributary branches coming out of the main shaft was decorated with three sets of "cups... shaped like almond blossoms... a bulb and a flower..." (Exodus 25:33, NASB). This would create three sets of three units on each branch, a total of nine units per branch. The main shaft, however, had four sets of blossoms, bulbs and flowers, making a total of twelve units on the shaft (Exodus 25:34). This would create a total of 66 units, which Conner claims is a picture of the Protestant canon of scripture (containing 66 books). Moreover, Conner notes that the total decorative units on the shaft and three branches equate to 39 (the number of Old Testament books within Protestant versions of the Bible); and the units on the remaining three branches come to 27 (the number of New Testament books). Conner connects this to Bible passages that speak of God's word as a light or lamp (e.g. Psalms 119:105; Psalms 119:130; cf. Proverbs 6:23).

In the Byzantine Rite the use of the menorah has been preserved, always standing on or behind the altar in the sanctuary. Though candles may be used, the traditional practice is to use olive oil in the seven-lamp lampstand. There are varying liturgical practices, and usually all seven lamps are lit for the services, though sometimes only the three centermost are lit for the lesser services. If the church does not have a sanctuary lamp the centermost lamp of the seven lamps may remain lit as an eternal flame.

== In art ==
=== Jewish art ===
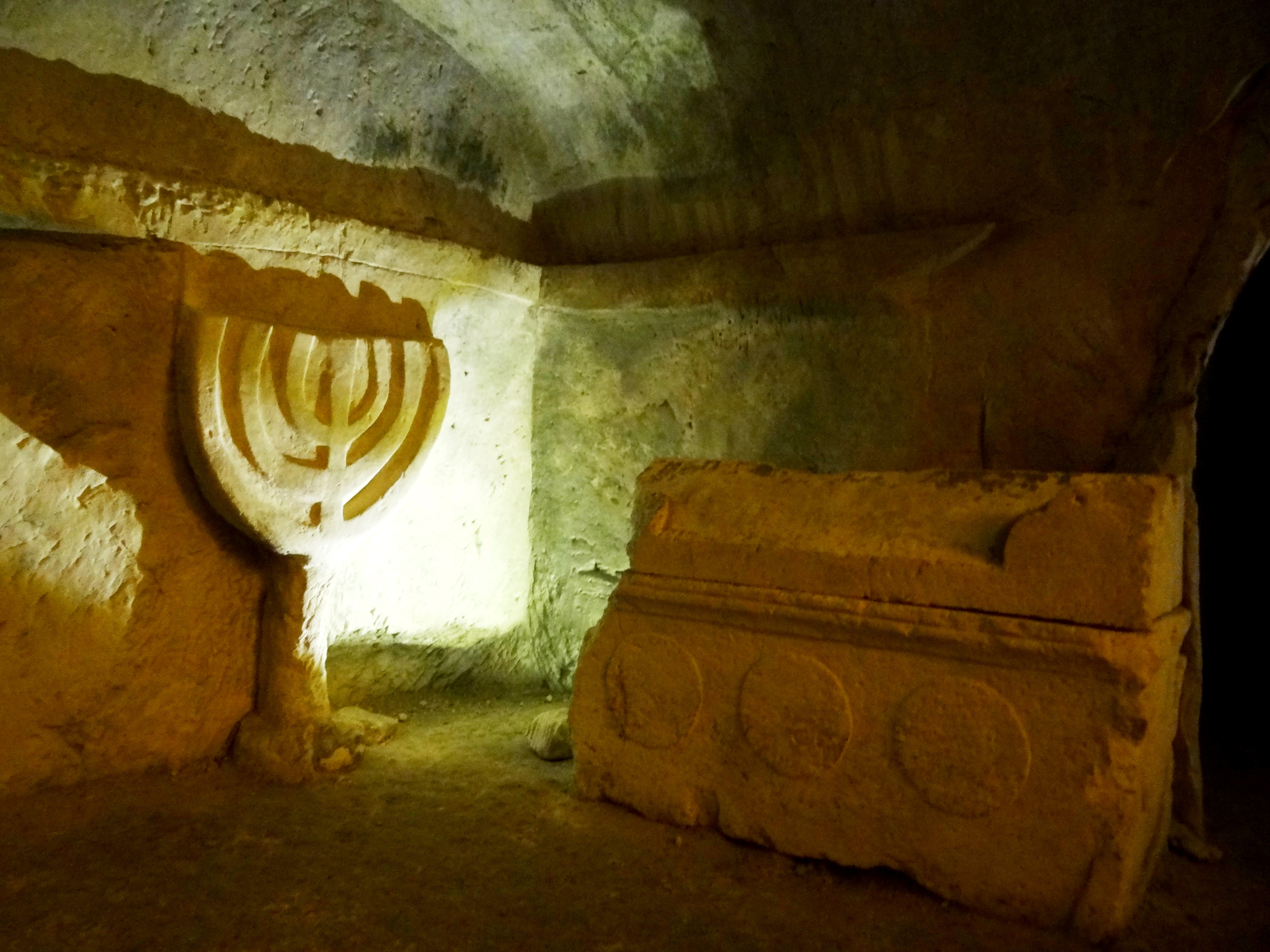
Menorah in the Cave of the Sarcophagi, Beit She'arim necropolis

The use of the temple menorah as an artistic decoration during the Second Temple period and up to the Bar Kokhba revolt is quite rare. Examples were uncovered in burial caves near Mukhmas (ancient Michmas), in the Herodian Quarter in the Old City of Jerusalem, and in Magdala (on the Magdala Stone). The use of menorahs in Jewish art and in particular in Jewish funerary art became much more common in the late Roman and Byzantine periods.

=== Samaritan art ===
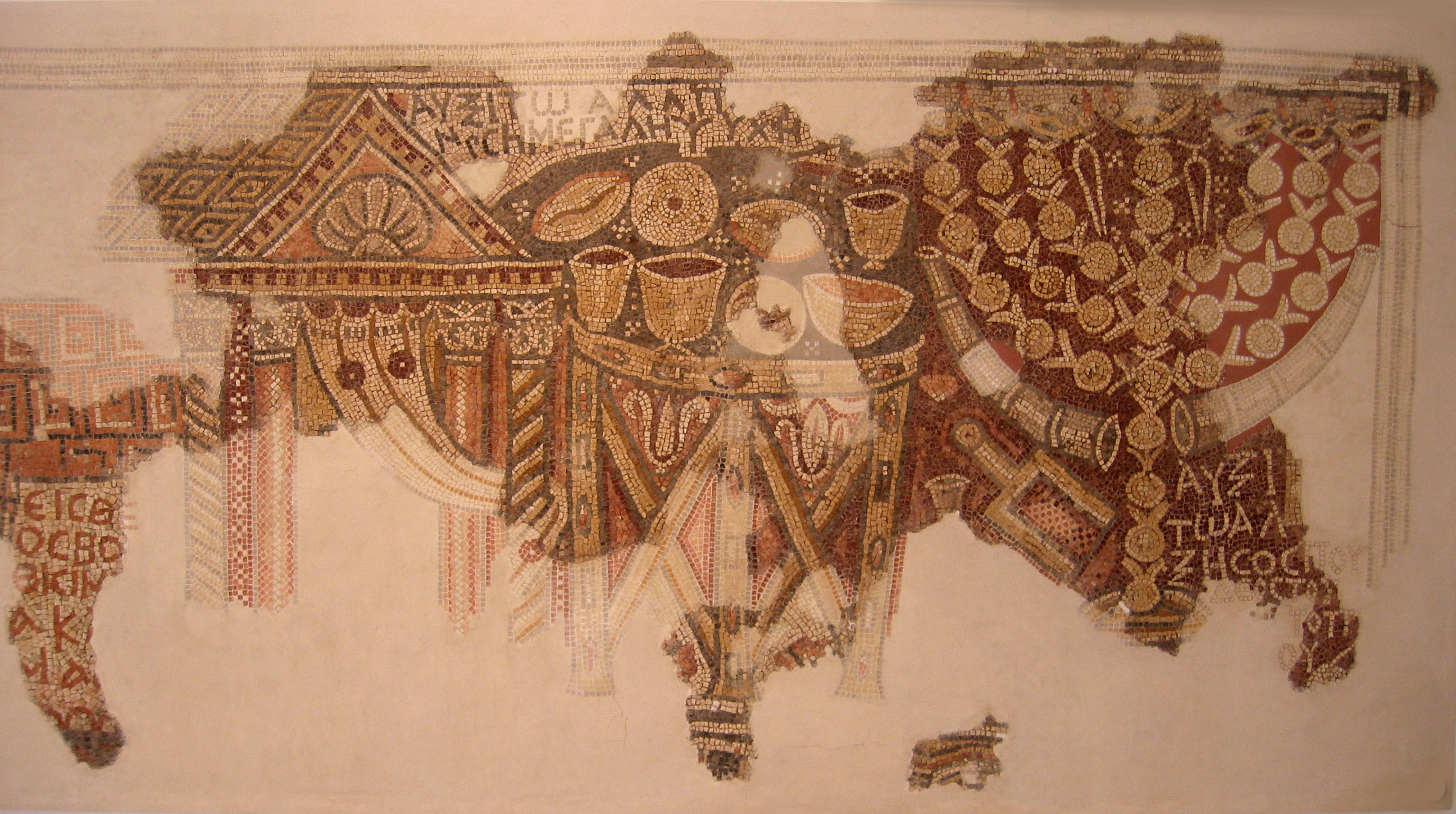
Mosaic with a seven-branched menorah from the Samaritan synagogue at El-Khirbe

The menorah was a distinctive symbol of Samaritan identity during the Byzantine and Islamic periods. Artistic depictions of the menorah have been uncovered at sites of ancient Samaritan synagogues, including El-Khirbe, Tzur Natan, and Sha'alvim. Repurposed stone menorah reliefs, some with accompanying plant decorations, have been found in contemporary structures in several villages of ancient Samaria, including Qariyet Hajjah, Kafr Abbush, Kafr Zibad, Kafr Qaddum and Kafr Jit.

== Modern Jewish use ==
=== In synagogues ===
Synagogues have a continually lit lamp or light in front of the Torah ark, where the Torah scroll is kept, called the ner tamid (eternal light). This lamp represents the continually lit ner Elohim of the menorah used in Temple times. In addition, many synagogues display either a menorah or an artistic representation of a menorah.

=== State of Israel ===
The Emblem of Israel shows a menorah surrounded by an olive branch on each side and the writing "ישראל" (Israel) based on its depiction on the Arch of Titus.

A menorah appears in the Emblem of Israel, based on the depiction of the menorah on the Arch of Titus.

=== Temple Institute reconstruction ===
The Temple Institute has created a life-sized menorah, designed by goldsmith Chaim Odem, intended for use in a future Third Temple. The Jerusalem Post describes the menorah as made "according to excruciatingly exacting Biblical specifications and prepared to be pressed into service immediately should the need arise." The menorah is made of one talent (interpreted as 45 kg) of 24 karat pure gold, hammered out of a single block of solid gold, with decorations based on the depiction of the original in the Arch of Titus and the Temple Institute's interpretation of the relevant religious texts.

=== Other modern Jewish uses ===
A menorah appeared on the cap badge of the First Judeans of the Jewish Legion (1919–1921).

Sometimes when teaching learners of the Hebrew language, a chart shaped like the seven-lamp menorah is used to help students remember the role of the binyanim of the Hebrew verb.

The menorah is the main element in several Holocaust memorials.

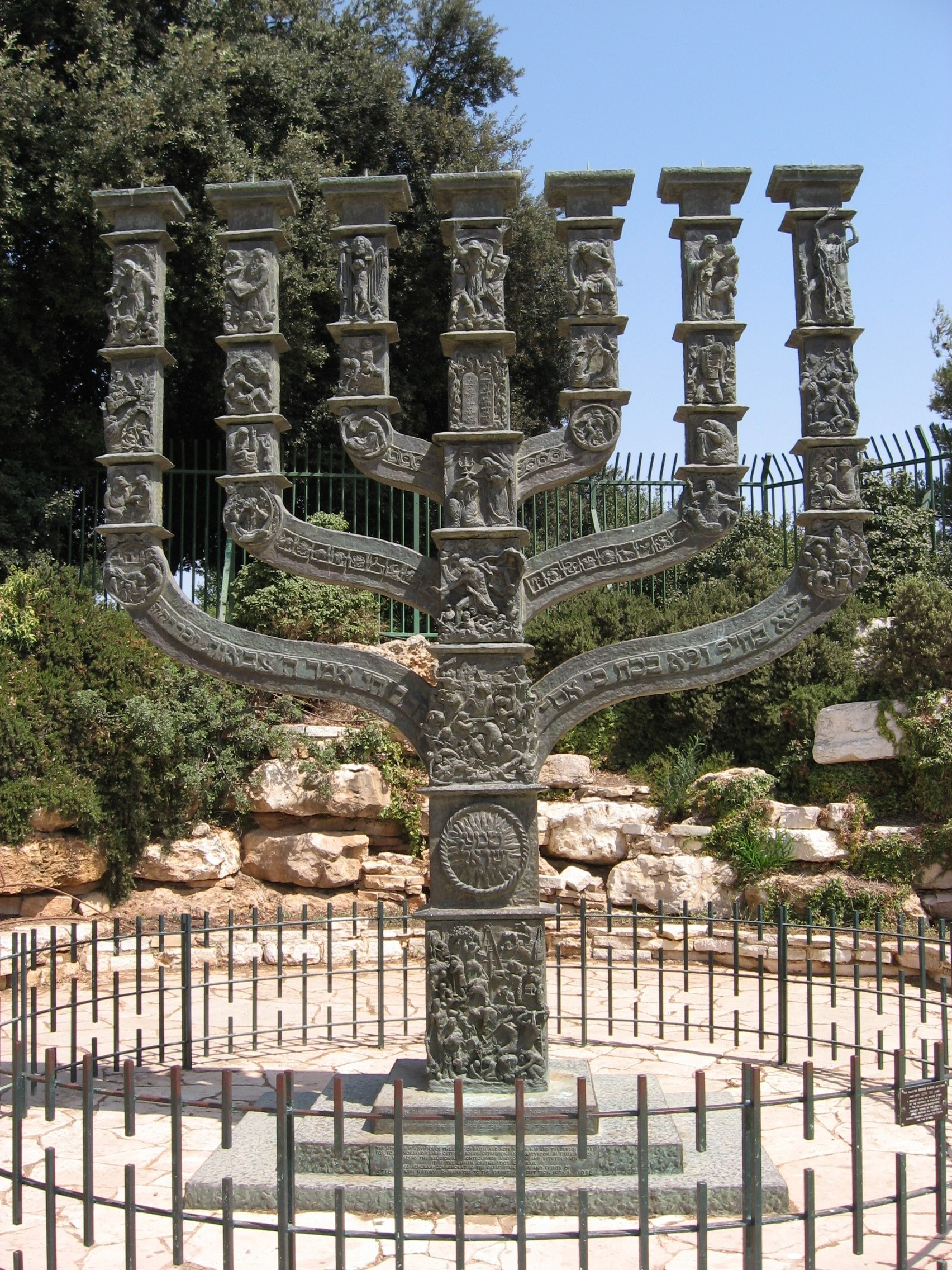
The Knesset Menorah outside the Knesset (Israeli Parliament)

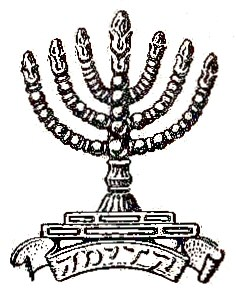
The Jewish Legion cap badge: menorah and word קדימה Kadima (forward)

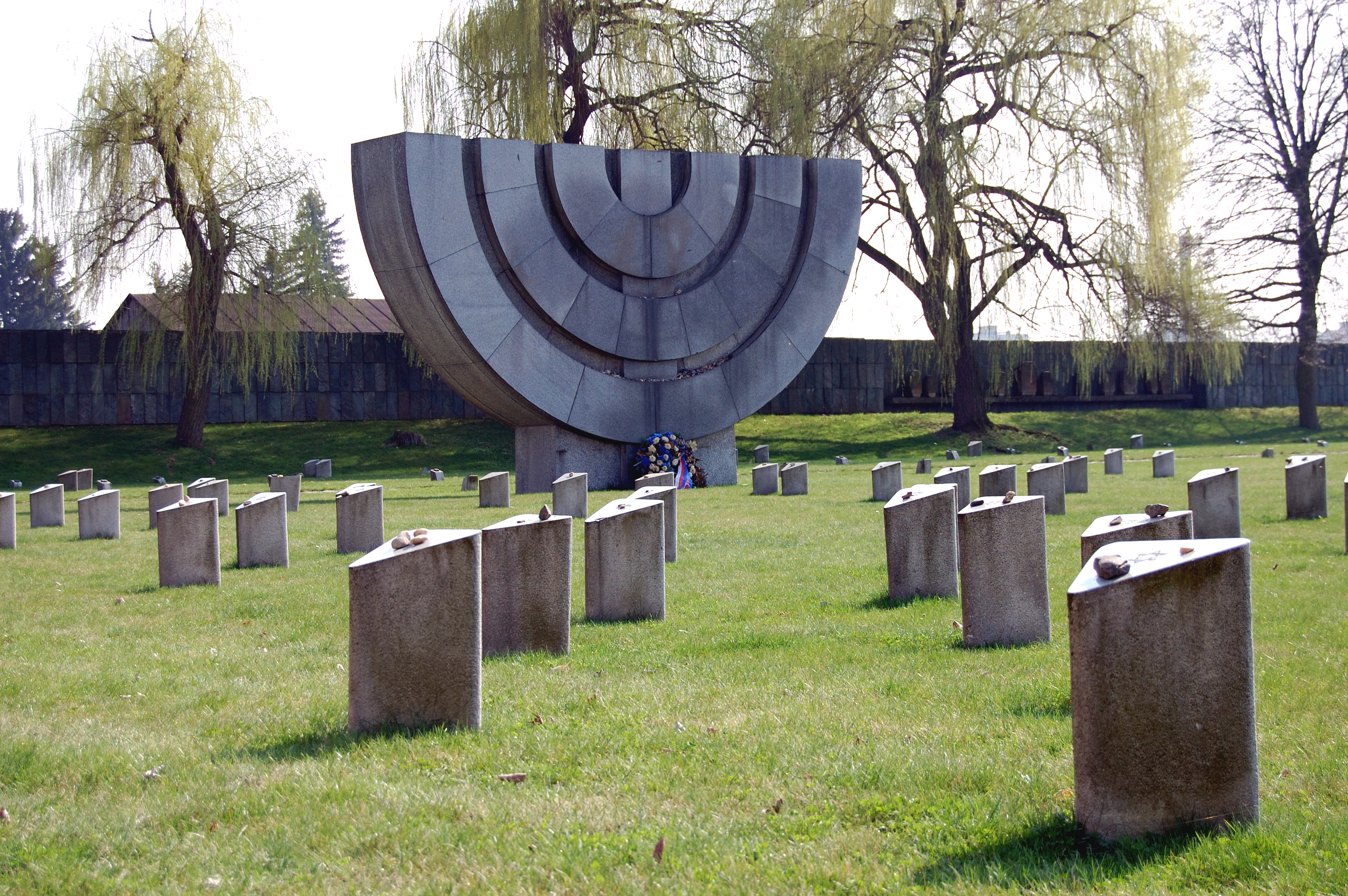
Menorah monument at Jewish Cemetery of Theresienstadt concentration camp

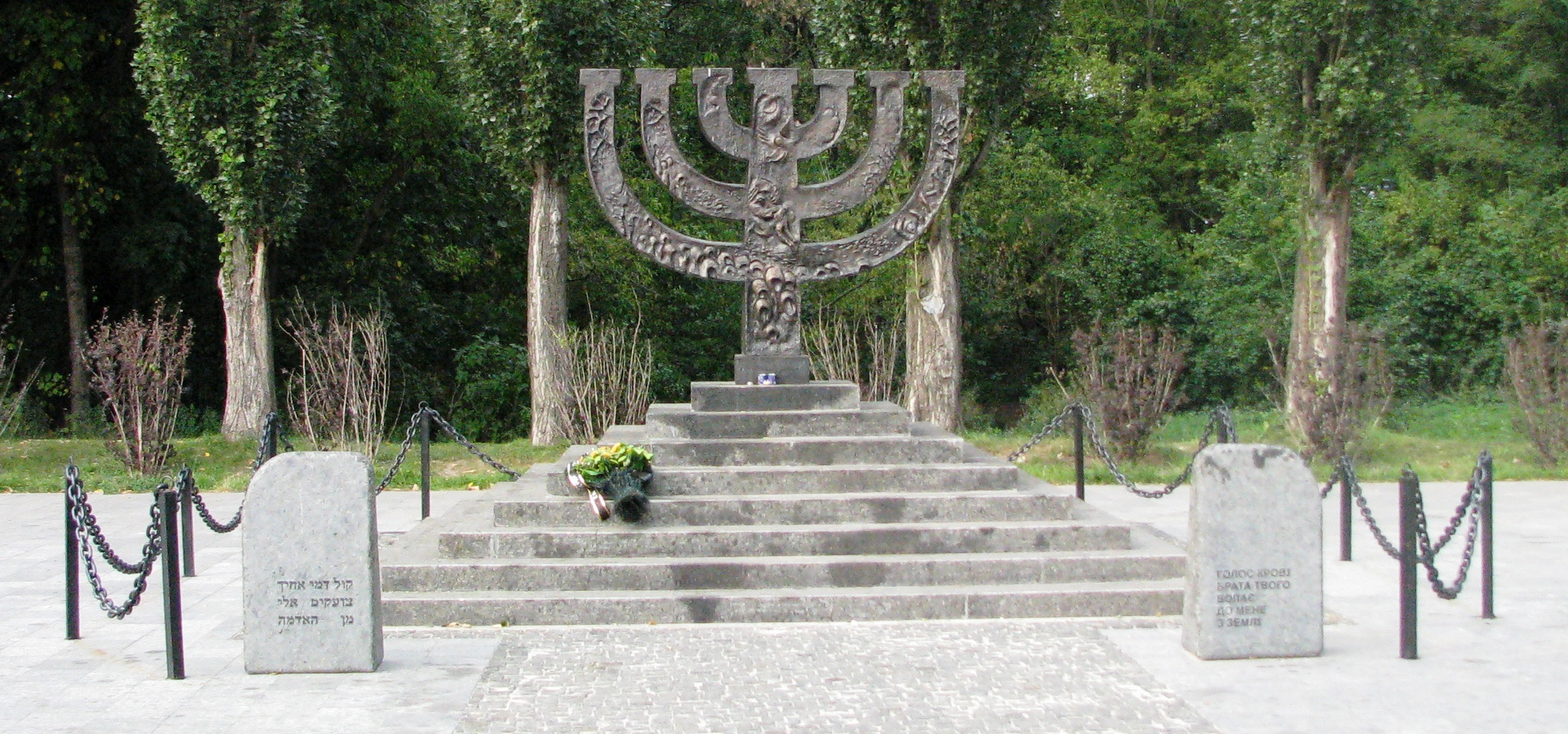
Menorah monument to the 33,771 Jews murdered at Babi Yar, Ukraine

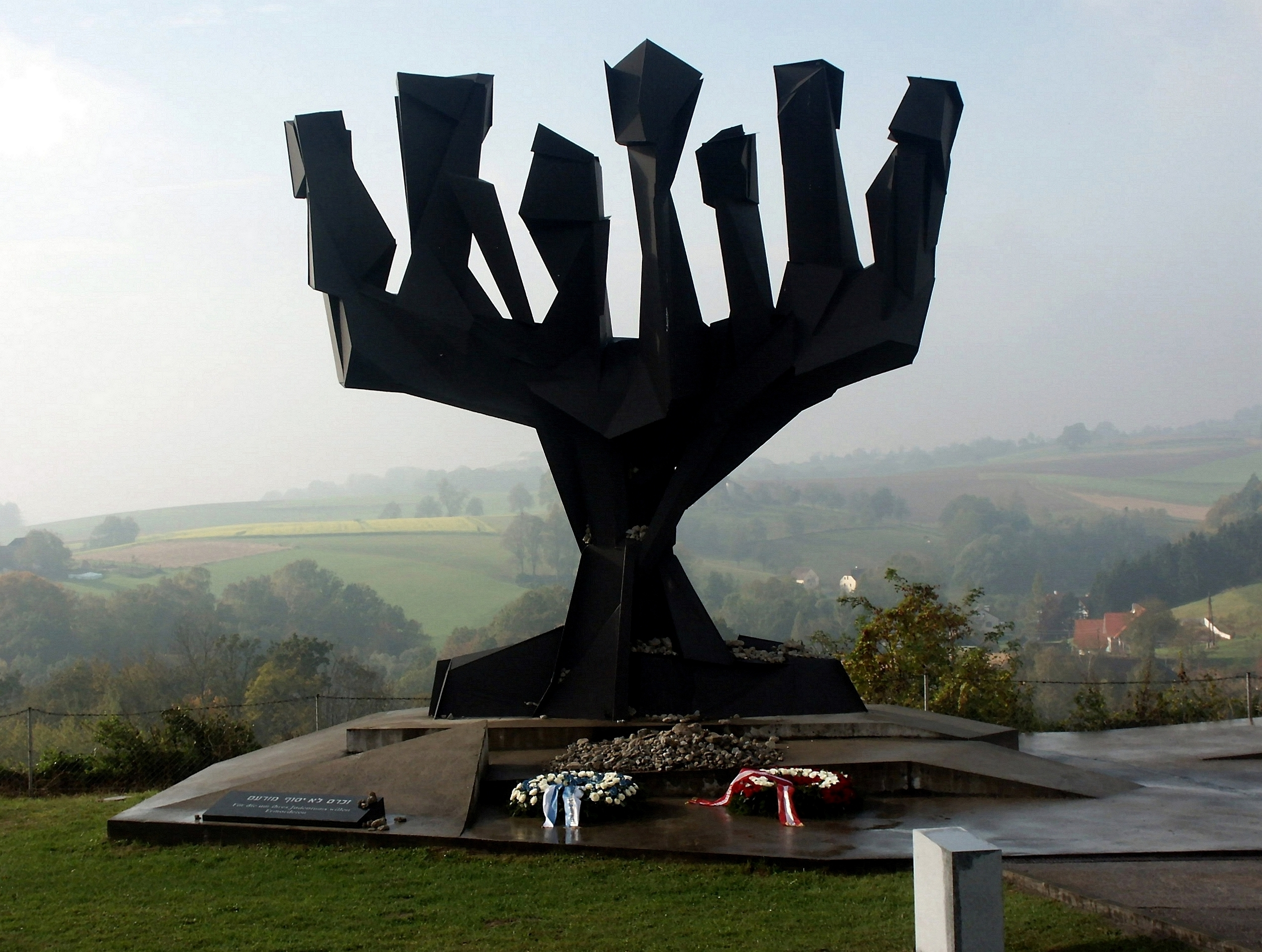
Menorah memorial of the State of Israel with memorial wreaths, KZ Mauthausen memorial, Austria

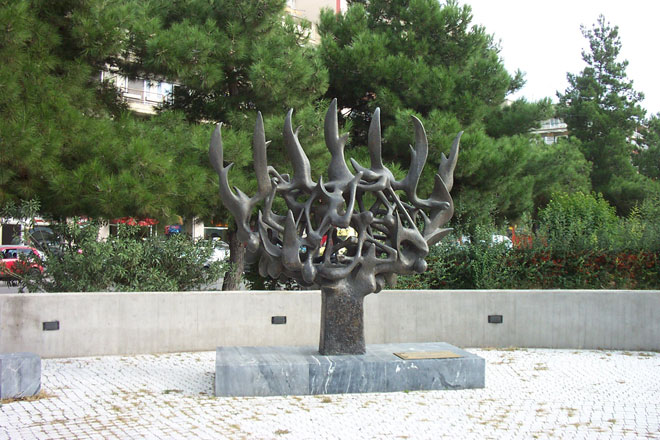
Menorah in flames, Holocaust memorial commemorating deportation of Thessaloniki Jews

== Similar objects ==
The kinara is also, like the menorah, a seven candleholder which is associated with the African American festival of Kwanzaa. One candle is lit on each day of the week-long celebration, in a similar manner as the Hannukah menorah.

In Taoism, the Seven-Star Lamp qi xing deng 七星燈 is a seven-lamp oil lamp lit to represent the seven stars of the Northern Dipper. This lampstand is a requirement for all Taoist temples, never to be extinguished. In the first 9 days of the lunar 9th month festival, an oil lamp of nine connected lamps may also be lit to honour both the Northern Dipper and two other assistant stars (collectively known as the Nine Emperor Stars), sons of Dou Mu appointed by the Taoist Trinity (the Three Pure Ones) to hold the Books of Life and Death of humanity. The lamps represent the illumination of the 7 stars, and lighting them are believed to absolve sins while prolonging one's lifespan.

== In popular culture ==
The menorah features prominently in the 2013 crypto-thriller The Sword of Moses by Dominic Selwood. It is also featured in the archaeology novels Crusader Gold, by David Gibbins, The Last Secret of the Temple, by Paul Sussman, and The Testament of Elias, by W.S. Mahler. A menorah can be seen in the movie X-Men: First Class, when Charles Xavier reads Erik Lehnsherr's mind, searching for a happy memory from his childhood before the Holocaust, and together they see Erik as a young child lighting his first menorah with his mother.

== Gallery ==
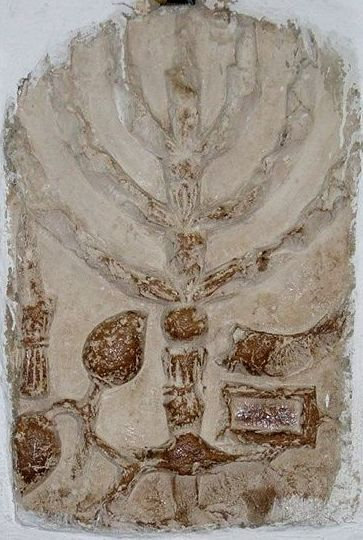
Second Temple period stone tablet from Peki'in Synagogue, Israel

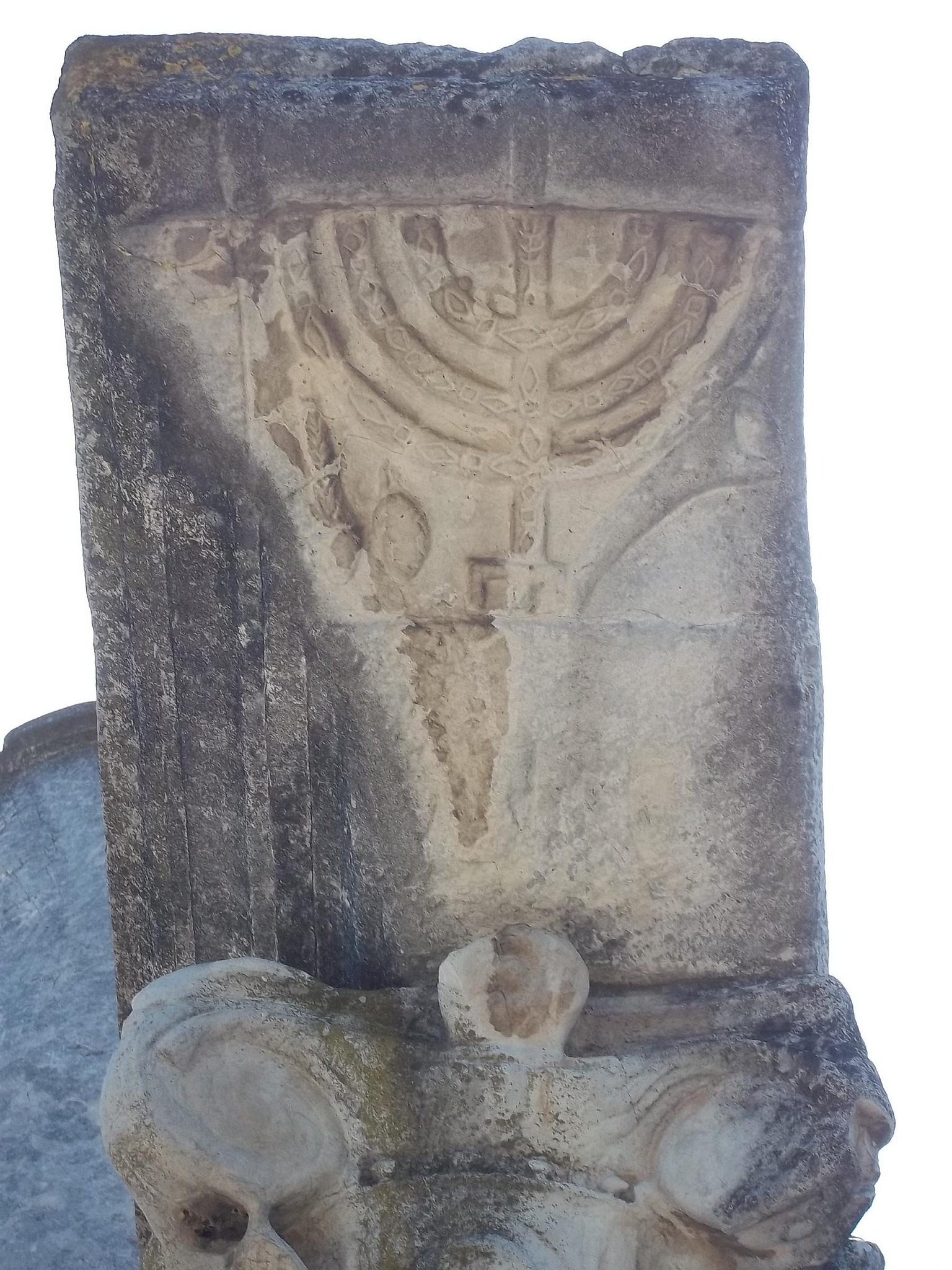
Detail of a menorah relief on a column, Ostia Synagogue, 1st century

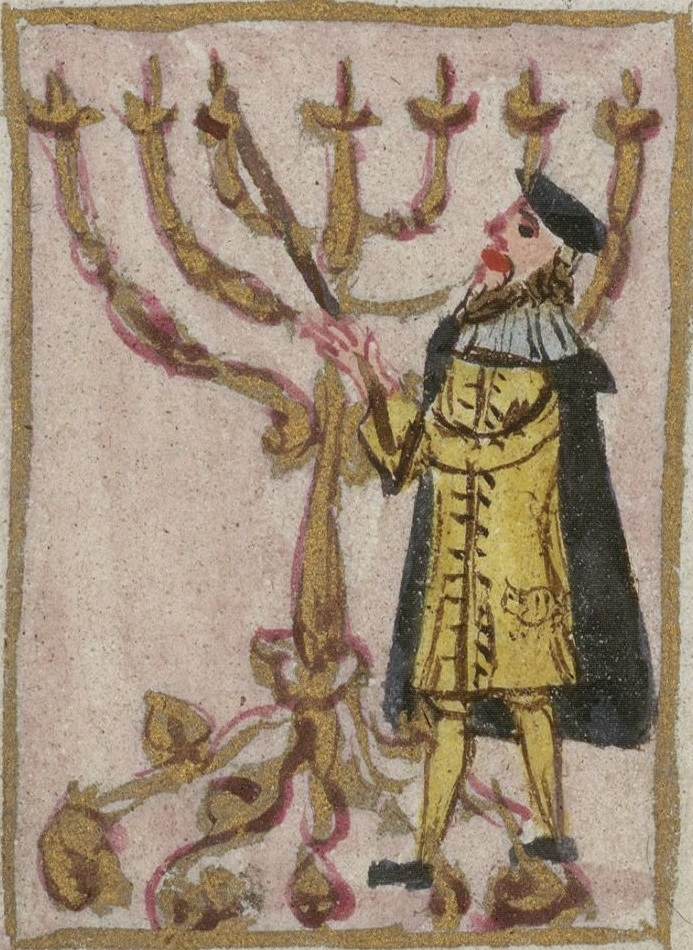
Drawing from a prayer book depicting the lighting of the Menorah, 1738, from the collections of the National Library of Israel

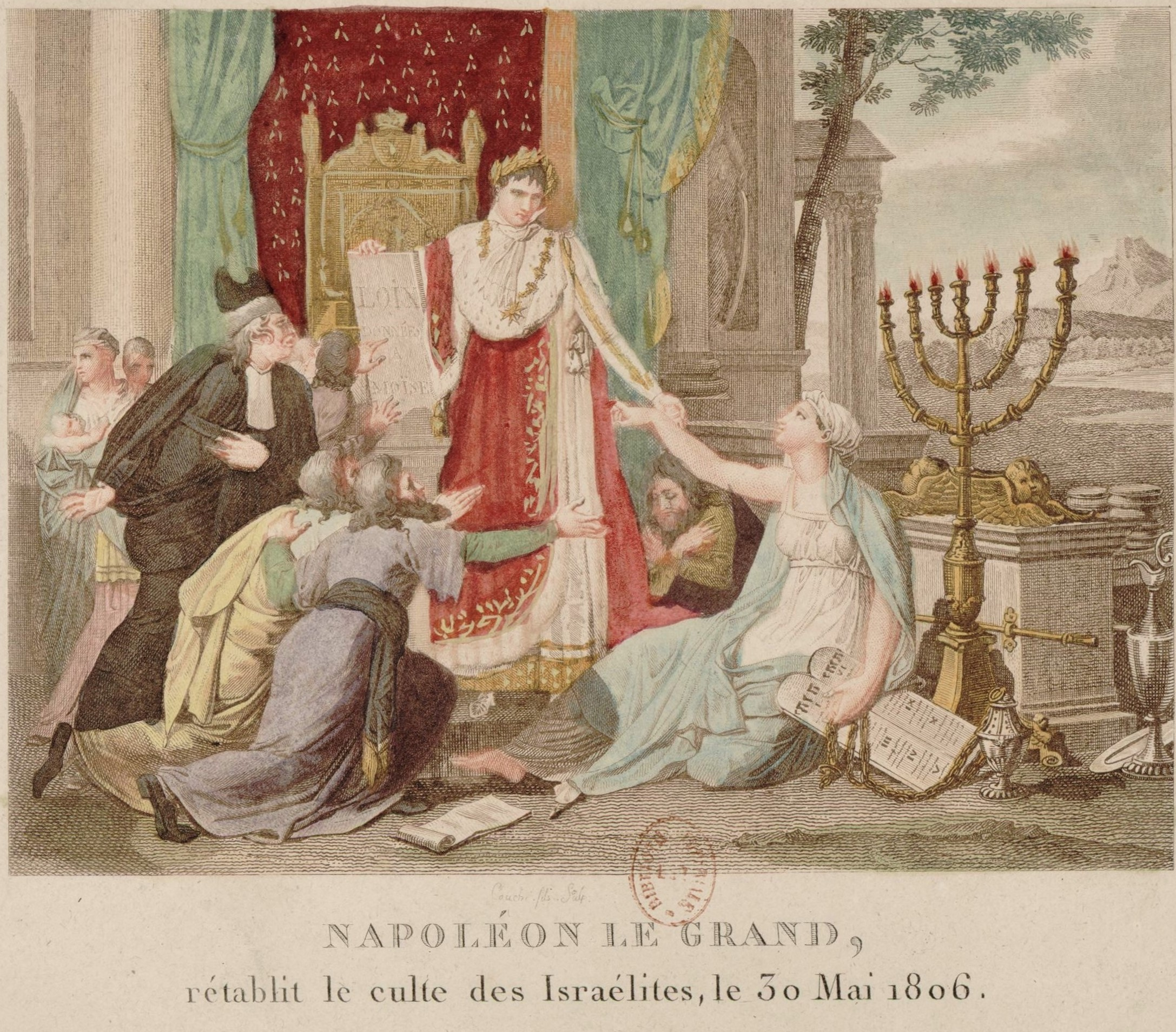
In this 1806 French print, the woman with the menorah represents the Jews being emancipated by Napoleon Bonaparte.

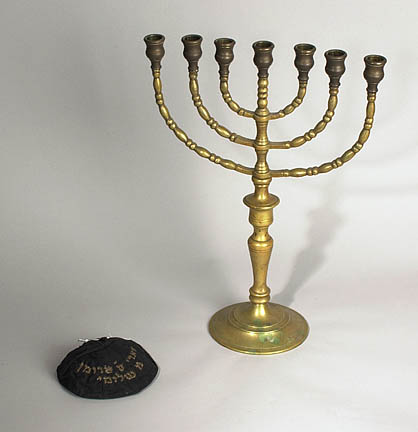
Kippa and menorah from the Harry S. Truman collection

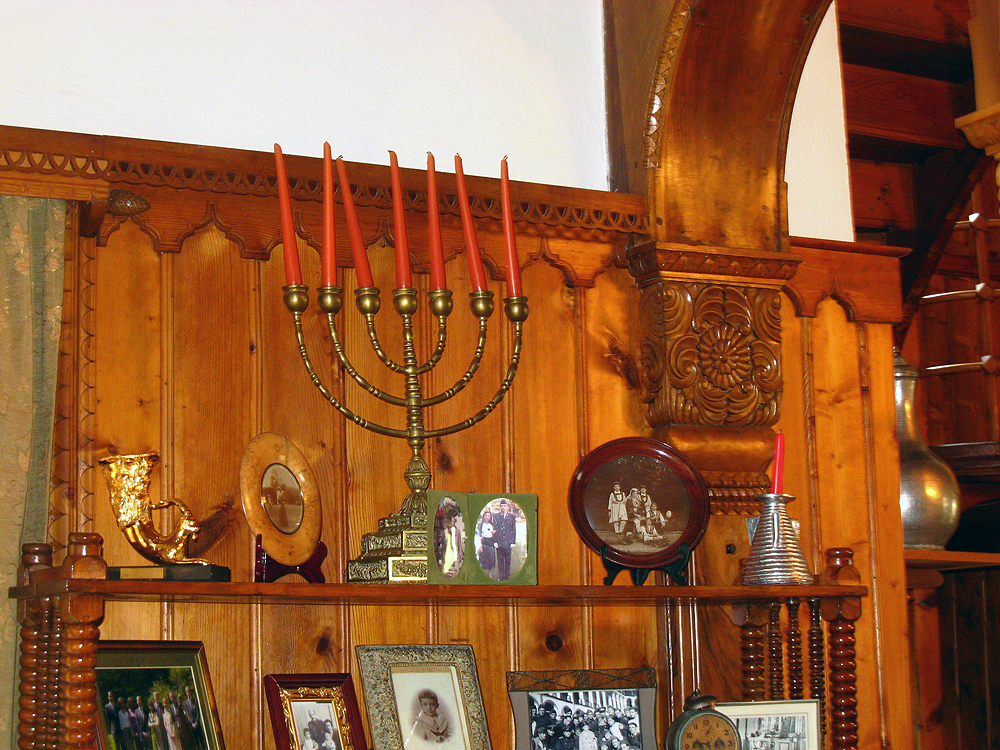
The menorah presented to Tsar Boris III from the Bulgarian Jewish community (Tsarska Bistritsa)

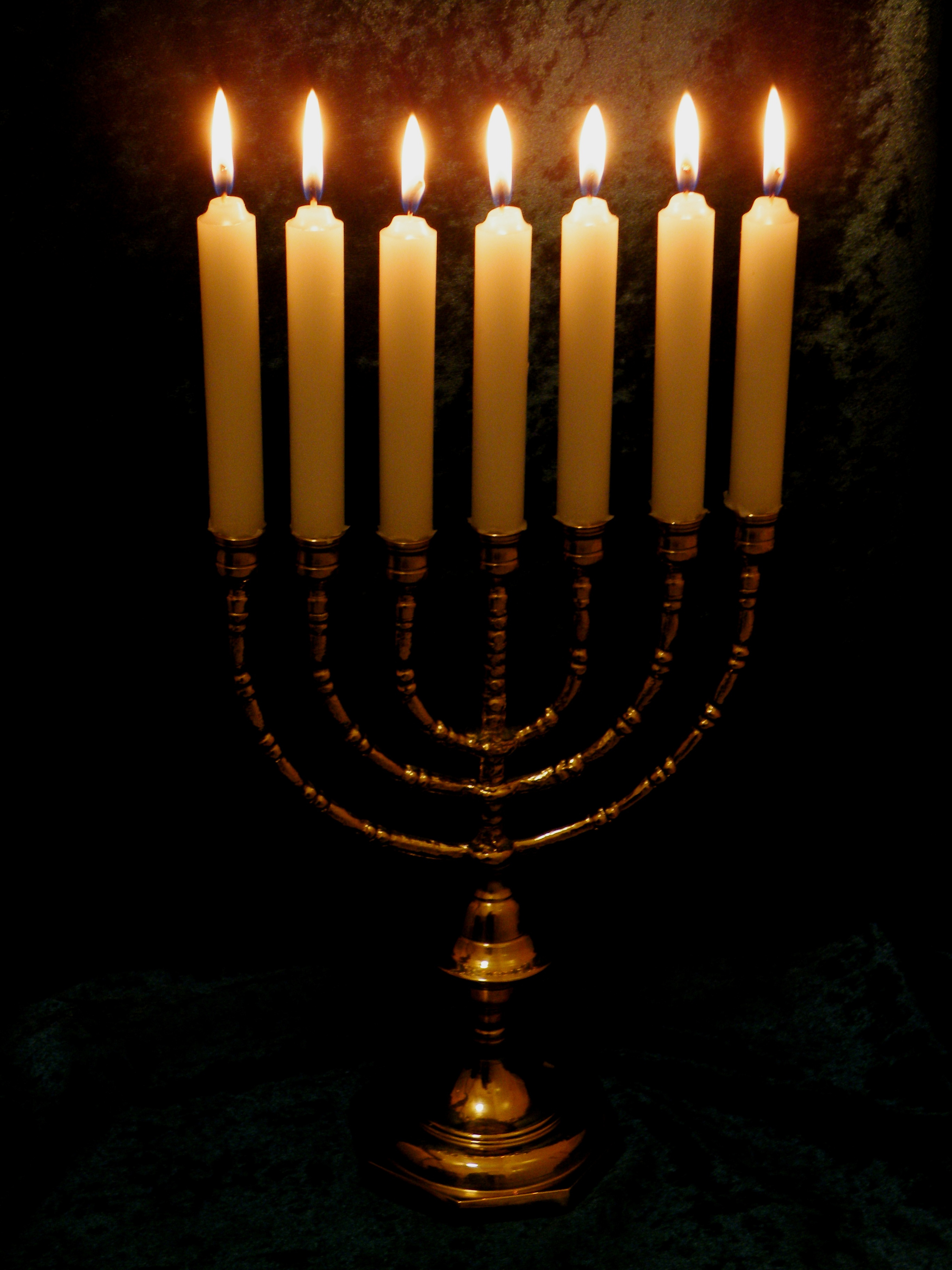
Sephardic style menorah from Spain

A menorah on the flag of Iglesia ni Cristo

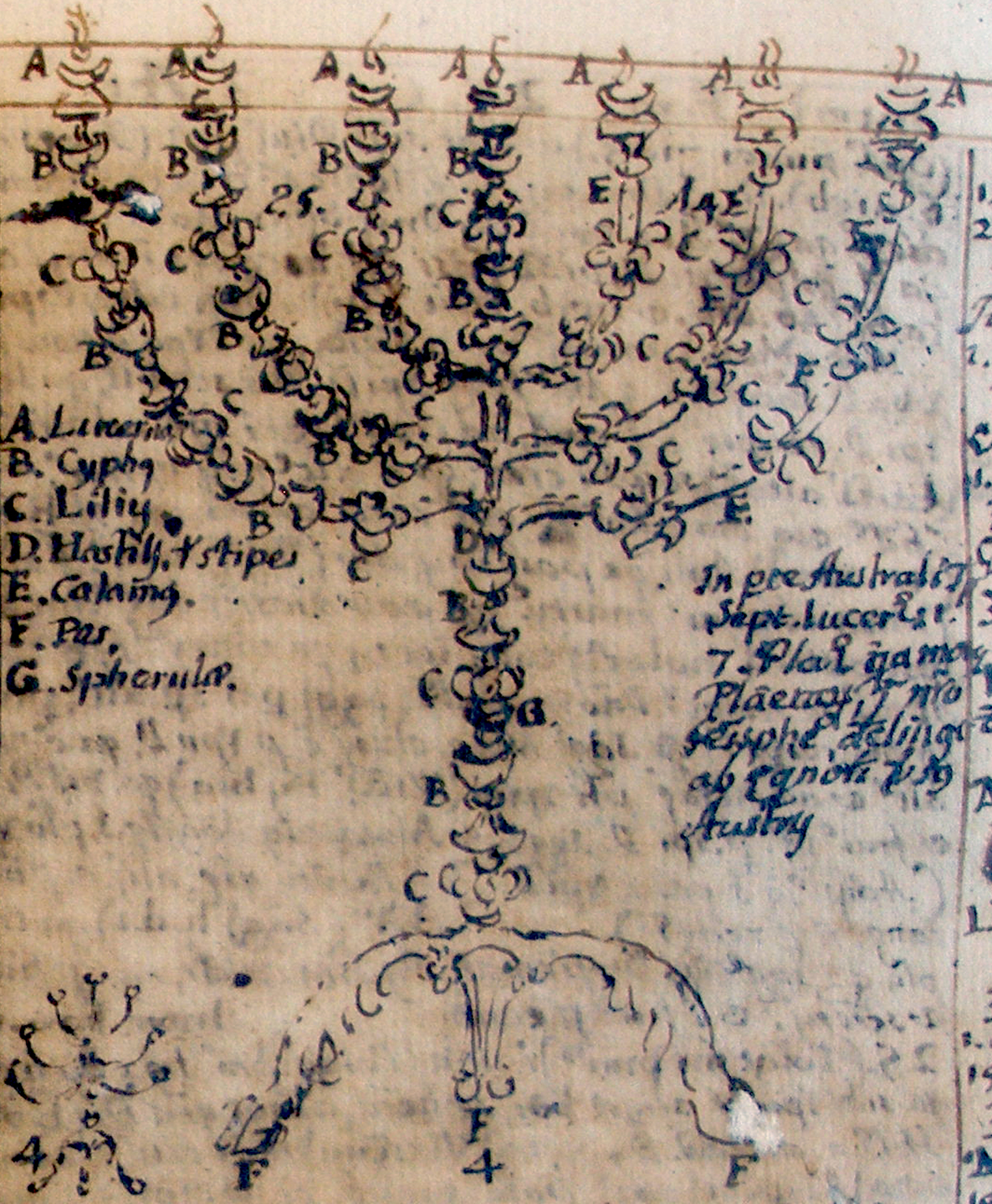
Fray Juan Ricci (1600–1681), sketch of the menorah as described in Exodus, undated. Biblioteca Statale del Monumento Nazionale di Monte Cassino, cod. 469, fol. 199v.

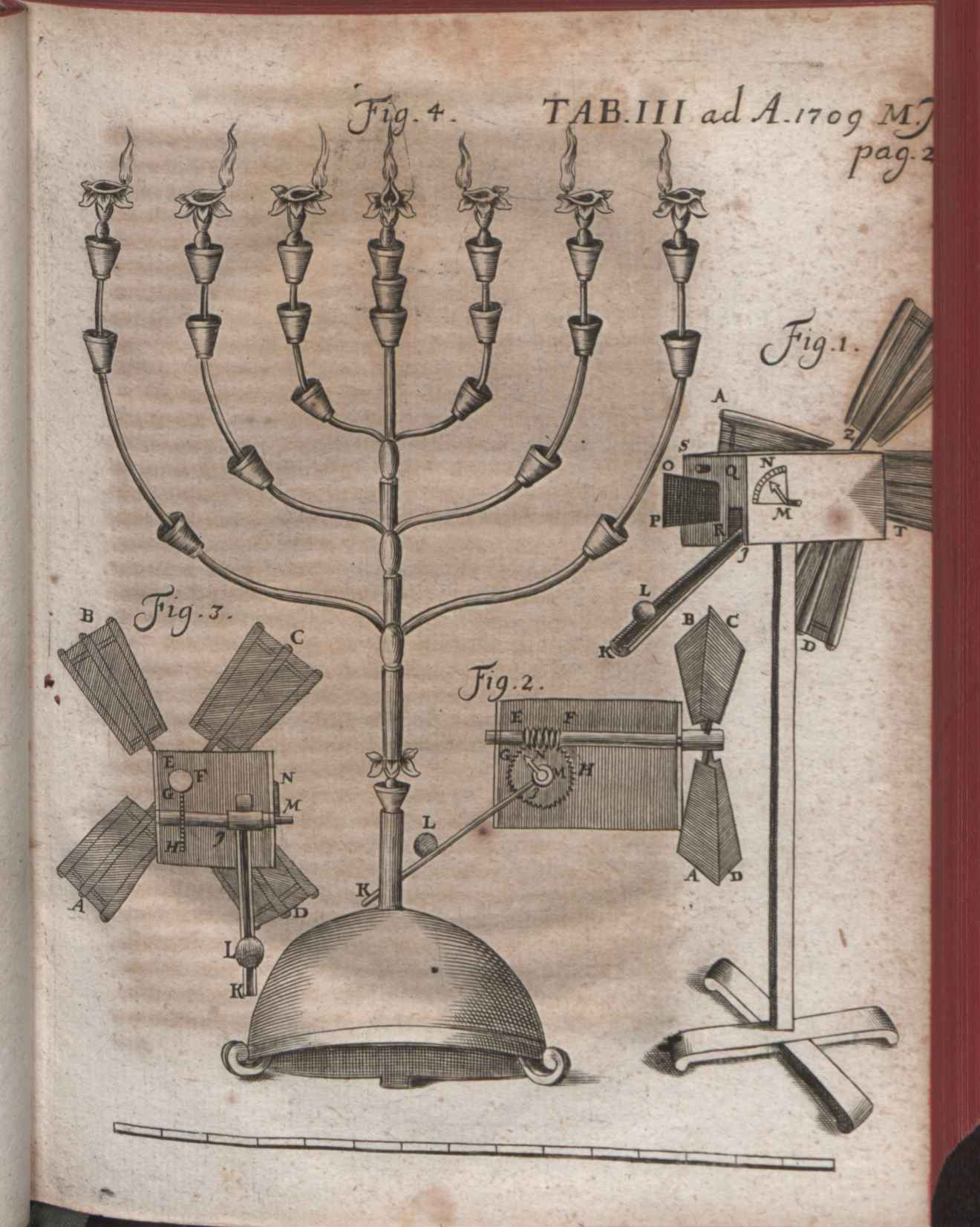
Illustration of menorah published in Acta Eruditorum, 1709

== See also ==
- Star of David
- Lachish Ewer
- Jewish symbols
- Drabsha, symbol of the Mandaean faith that represents the Light of God and seven days of creation.
- Mishneh Torah Avodah Laws of the Temple 3:1–10
- Seven-branched candelabrum (Essen)
