= Joel Arthur Rosenthal =

American jeweller

Joel Arthur Rosenthal (born 1943) is an American jeweller who works in Paris where he founded the fine jewelry firm JAR. He has been called "the Faberge of our time."

== Early life ==
Born in 1943 in the Bronx, Joel Arthur Rosenthal is the only son of a postman and a teacher in biology. He spent a semester at City College of New York studying linguistics; he speaks French, Italian, English and Yiddish. He then transferred to Harvard University, where he studied art history and philosophy, graduating in 1966. He then moved to Paris where he worked as a screenwriter, then as a needle-stitcher, opening a small shop. He experimented with unusually colored yarn. Its clientele included designers from Hermès and Valentino. Rosenthal one day was asked if he could design a mount for a gemstone. That sent his career in a new direction.

== Career ==
After a short stint as a salesman in the New York store of Bulgari, he returned to Paris in 1977 and began designing pieces there from affordable materials, such as coral, moonstone and minute colored diamond. Quick success led the self-taught Rosenthal to open a non-descript salon at 7 Place Vendôme, where he still hosts his loyal clients. His company, JAR, has no shop window or sign on the street. The entry is made on the sponsorship of a known customer and for persons whose name excludes any ambiguity. Each piece is unique, created for a specific client; his yearly output is a scant 70-80 pieces. He takes inspiration from the fauna and flora for his creations, mixing references from the past with current techniques of jewelry. What Rosenthal has been doing since 1977 is setting gems in pavé arrangements as fine as needlepoint stitches, frequently amplifying the stones' colors by mounting them in a blackened alloy.

In 1994, JAR made a Parrot Tulip bangle of gold, with diamond and garnet accents, that sold at auction in 2014 for 3.25 million Swiss francs.

In 2002, the first public exhibition devoted to JAR was held in London. The 400 pieces presented, mostly lent by their owners, were arranged in full black, the visitors having to use a flashlight to observe them. On this occasion JAR published the only book on his works, JAR Paris, a catalog of 720 pages printed in a limited number of copies. His only other public exhibition was at the New York Metropolitan Museum of Art in 2013. Rosenthal is the only living "artist of gems" to have had a solo show at New York's Metropolitan Museum of Art.

In 2017, Rosenthal created his first piece of Judaica for the exhibition Menorah: Worship, History, Legend, co-sponsored by the Vatican and the Jewish Museum of Rome. It was the sole work commissioned for the exhibition and his first work not meant for a collector, "but, to be seen out there."

"It was unexpected," he said of being a part of the exhibition. "I have done all I could to shield myself from what's going on in the world" — and this show, with its message of unity, was a clear (if gentle) statement about what is going on the world. "But I was confident because of what it is and where it was going."
