= Kaifeng Jews =

Jewish community in Kaifeng, China

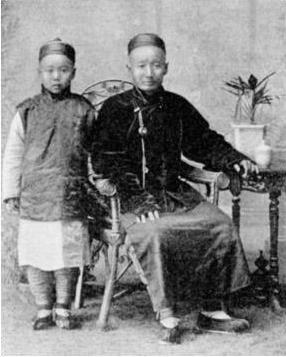
- Jews of Kaifeng, late 19th or early 20th century

Regions with significant populations
- China: 600–1,000 (2008 estimate)
- Israel: 19 (as of 2016)

Languages
- Mandarin Chinese, Hebrew

Religion
- Irreligion, Judaism

Related ethnic groups
- Han Chinese, Hui people, Iranian Jews, and other ancient Jewish populations

Kaifeng Jews (Note: Chinese: 開封猶太人; pinyin: Kāifēng Yóutàirén; Hebrew: יהדות קאיפנג, romanized: Yahădūt Qāʾyfeng) are a small community of descendants of Chinese Jews in Kaifeng, Henan province, China. In the early centuries of their settlement, they may have numbered around 2,500 people. Despite their isolation from the rest of the Jewish diaspora, their ancestors managed to practice Jewish traditions and customs for several centuries.

The distinctive customary life of the Kaifeng community slowly eroded, as assimilation and intermarriage with non-Jewish (Han Chinese and Hui) neighbors advanced, until, by the 19th century, its Jewishness largely became extinct, apart from its retention of memories of its clan's Jewish past as the Jews became Chinese. (Note: Donald Leslie wrote in 1972 that the most detailed and convincing report about them, written in 1932 by an American Jew, David A. Brown, stated that: "They know they are Jews, but know nothing of Judaism. They realize they are Chinese, completely assimilated, yet there is pride in the knowledge that they spring from an ancient people who are different from the other Chinese in K'ai feng" (Leslie 1972, p. 71).)

The place of origin of these Jews and the date when they established their settlement in Kaifeng are sources of intense debate among experts. While the descendants of the Kaifeng Jews are assimilated into mainstream Kaifeng Han culture, some of them are trying to revive the beliefs and customs of their ancestors. In the 21st century, efforts have been made to revive Kaifeng's Jewish heritage and encourage the descendants of its original population to convert back to Judaism. Via the offices of the Shavei Israel organization, 19 young Chinese descendants of Kaifeng Jews have made aliyah, and in the process have had to do a formal conversion. Since 2015, descendants of the Kaifeng Jews have come under government pressure and suspicion.

== History ==
=== Background ===
The origin of the Kaifeng Jews and the date of their arrival is one of the most intensely debated topics in the field of Chinese-Jewish relations. (Note: "The debate about the origin, arrival and nature of the Kaifeng Jews is one of the most heated in the entire field of Sino-Judaica, arguably second only to that surrounding the history of the Jewish refugee community of Shanghai." (Yu 2017, p. 369)) Though some scholars date their arrival to the Tang dynasty (618–907), or even earlier, (Note: The self-published sinologist and independent researcher Tiberiu Weisz undertook a new translation of the stelae, and based on it, he theorizes that after the Babylonian captivity, disenchanted Levites and Kohanim broke with the prophet Ezra and settled in Northwest India. He further guesses that sometime before 108 BCE, these Jews migrated to Gansu, where they were spotted by the Chinese general Li Guangli, who was sent to the region and ordered to expand the borders of Han dynasty China. Centuries later, during the Huichang persecution of Buddhism (845–46), the Jews were expelled from Ningxia, the region of China proper, which they were then living in. Weisz believes that they later returned to China during the Song dynasty, when its second emperor, Taizong, circulated a decree which stated that he was seeking the wisdom of foreign scholars. In his review of Weisz's book, Irvin Berg states that the author excluded many religious documents—Torah, Haggadah, prayer books, etc.—in his thesis, he only quoted the stories which were recounted on the stelae. Berg also criticized Weisz's failure to study the implications of the Kaifeng liturgical documents being written in Judeo-Persian, which was only developed in the 8th century CE. Weisz ignores the anachronisms which are written on the stelae, such as the attribution of a grant of land to build a synagogue to a Ming dynasty emperor even though it dates back to the Song dynasty Weisz 2014, pp. 23–32;) Steven Sharot, reflecting the majority view, considers that the most probable date for the formation of a Jewish community in Kaifeng was sometime during the Song dynasty (960–1279). That Jewish merchants were active before Song China appears probable from the fact that the Muslim Persian geographer ibn Khordadbeh in his Book of Roads and Kingdoms ca. 870 describes the Jewish Radhanite merchants as operating over a wide arc from Western Europe to China. (Note: "Their name probably comes from Rādhān, an area near Baghdad, where a community of Eastern Islamic Jews lived." (Thomas 2017, pp. 6, 12)) It has been conjectured that this group constituted the first of two waves of Jewish settlement in China, the second being associated with the Mongol conquest of China and the establishment of the Yuan dynasty. (Note: The report in The Travels of Marco Polo that Kubilai Khan reverenced Moses, and kissed a volume of the Hebrew scriptures, often used as evidence for Jews in China in the 13th century, is regarded as a later interpolation, probably the handiwork of Giambattista Ramusio in his 1553 edition of that work (Pollak 2005, p. 207).)

According to a scholarly consensus, the Jewish community of Kaifeng primarily consisted of people of Persian Jewish origin. Uncertainty persists as to whether they came overland through Chang'an, via either of the two Silk Roads, (Note: There was also a northern branch, the Silk Road of the Steppes, which ran through Xorazm, Tian Shan, the Alatau Pass to Chang'an, whose re-opening coincided with the establishment of the Jewish Khanate of the Khazars (Thomas 2017, pp. 8–9)) or whether they travelled inland after they reached coastal cities like Guangzhou or Quanzhou by sea. Ibn Khordadbeh's Rhadanites used both routes. Some evidence has been interpreted to suggest that their ancestors may have mostly hailed from the Bukharan Jewish branch of Persian Jews who had settled in Central Asia. In all likelihood, all of the founders of the community were male Jewish merchants: the arduous, dangerous nature of the route, and the length of time which they needed to spend in order to travel on it, would have probably forced them to rule out bringing their wives, and after they settled in Kaifeng, they married Chinese women. (Note: "In China, the merchant Jews who arrived around the eleventh century were, given the length, difficulties, and danger of the journey, unlikely to have brought wives with them. Those who elected to remain in China took Chinese wives, who, as is well documented, converted to Judaism." (Paper 2012, p. 9))

Among the vast trove of documents which Aurel Stein discovered in Dunhuang in Gansu in northwestern China was a bill of sale for sheep which dated back to 718 written in new New Persian using the Hebrew alphabet. (Note: The language which they spoke was probably New Persian. Technically, Judeo-Persian is a kind of New Persian written with the Hebrew alphabet. Jewish speakers of Persian also knew how to write in pārsi/fārsi or lafẓ-e fārsi/lašon fārsi.) They wrote their documents on paper, something which was unavailable in the West, together with a fragment of a Seliḥoth that was probably composed in the eighth or ninth century. A century later, the Arab geographer Abū Zayd Ḥasan al-Sīrāfī mentioned in 910 the Guangzhou massacre of 878/9, in which Muslims, Oriental Christians, and Jews were killed, attesting to the latter group's presence in China.

Trade with China was predominantly maritime and dominated by Arabs, with many Jews also engaged in this network. By the 11th century, more than a million Arabs lived in port enclaves, where they were allowed self-administration. At least seven synagogue communities are attested for this period in all major Chinese port cities, such as Ningbo City, Guangzhou and Hangzhou. Goods from these coastal centres were transported inland via the Grand Canal to the Yellow River and then by barge to Kaifeng. The Jewish community that was eventually established in Kaifeng survived the collapse of these sister communities on the eastern seaboard, all of which disappeared in the 15–16th centuries when the Ming dynasty's ability to protect its coast was crippled by raids by Wokou.

=== The Song/Yuan period hypotheses ===
The point of departure for determining precisely when a community (kehillah) was established relies on two forms of evidence: the information surviving in inscriptions from four stelae recovered from Kaifeng, and references in Chinese dynastic sources. The dates on the stelae range from 1489 through 1512 and 1663 to 1679. Chinese documents on Jews are rare compared to the voluminous records of other peoples. (Note: "It was only by way of exception that Jewish persons or activities were of interest to Chinese officials or men of letters. There are no specific Chinese monographs on the Jews, as there are, for example, about the Tibetan or Turkish groups with whom the imperial government perforce came into contact." (Loewe 1988, p. 1)) The first official documents referring to the Jews as a distinct group date to the 12th century.

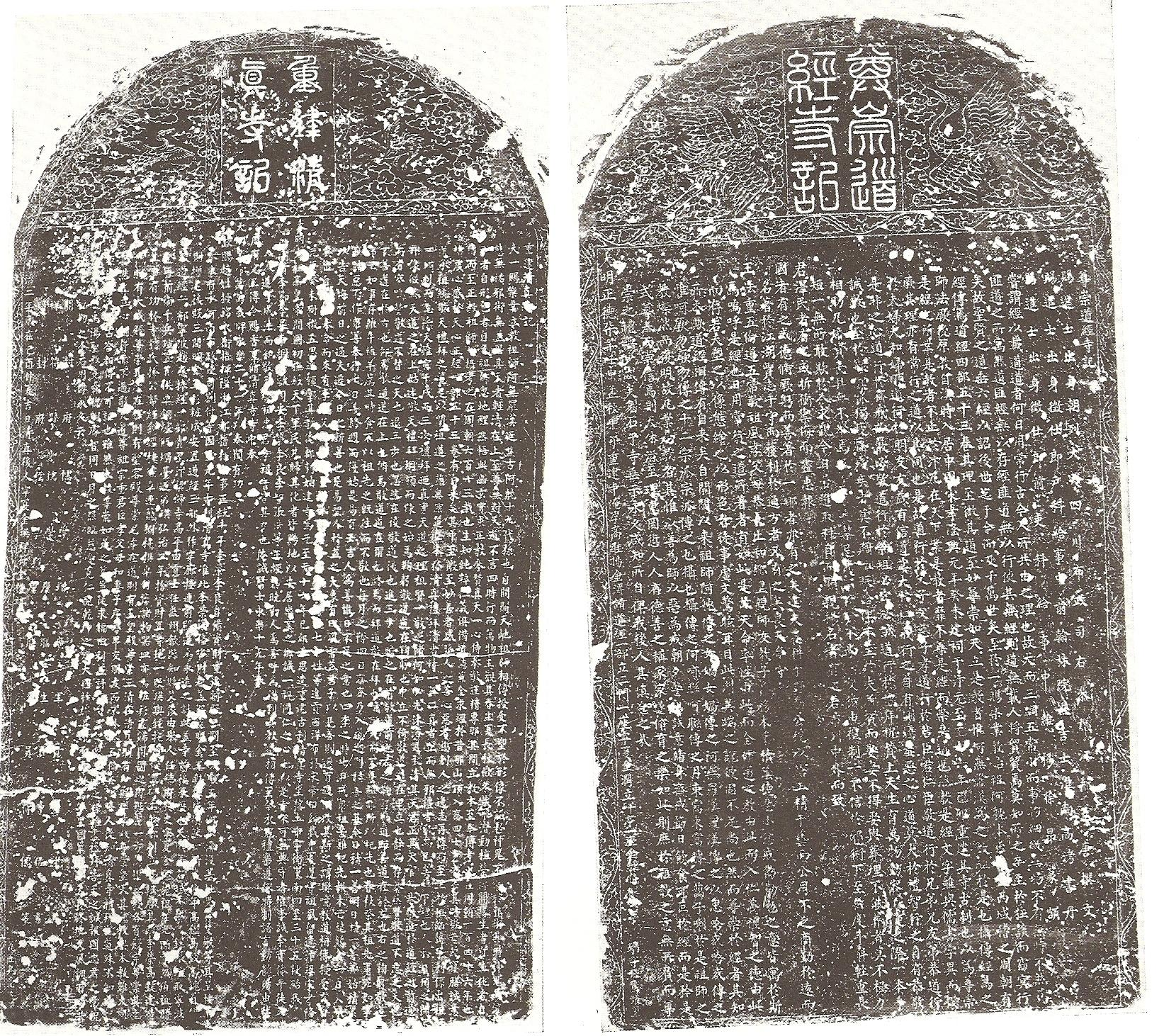
Ink rubbings of the 1489 stele (left) and 1512 stele (right)

Two Chinese scholars have argued that the Jews went to China in 998, because the Song History records that in the year 998, a monk (僧) named Ni-wei-ni (你尾尼; Nǐ wěi ní) and others had spent seven years traveling from India to China in order to pay homage to the Song Emperor Zhenzong. They identified this Ni-wei-ni as a Jewish rabbi. Others followed this up with a claim that the Song History provides a precise date for a large population of Jewish expatriates accompanying Ni-wei-ni from India who putatively arrived in Kaifeng on 20 February 998. These inferences contradict Buddhist records for Ni-wei-ni's visit. (Note: "In 998, the Central Indian monk Ni-wei-ni (沙門你尾抳) and others came to China to meet Emperor Song Zhenzong with Buddhist relics, scriptures, banyan leafs and several banyan seeds." (Yu 2017, p. 372; Zhi-pan 2002, p. 444)) Both the sēng (僧) used to describe Ni-wei-ni in the Song dynastic history and the shāmén (沙門) in the Buddha Almanac of Zhi-pan mean "Buddhist monk", not rabbi. Furthermore, Ni-wei-ni did not bring Western cloth with him, but banyan seeds.

The earliest stele erected by the Kaifeng community bears the date 1489. This, it is affirmed, commemorates the construction in 1163 of a synagogue called Qingzhensi (清真寺; qīngzhēnsì; 'True and pure Temple'), the customary term for mosques in China. (Note: However the 1479 stone also uses a term "The Temple of Israel" for their synagogue.(一賜樂業業: Yīsìlèyèdiàn (Löwenthal 1947, p. 123, n.129)) The inscription states that the Jews came to China from Tiānzhú (天竺), (Note: "Others have favoured an Indian origin, but their arguments do not appear convincing" (Thomas 2017, p. 3).) a Han-Song term for India. It adds that they brought Western cloth as tribute for an emperor, unnamed, who welcomed them with the words: "You have come to Our China; reverence and preserve the customs of your ancestors, and hand them down at Bianliang (汴梁; Biànliáng)," i.e., Kaifeng. The same stone inscription also associates the building's establishment with two names: An-du-la (俺都喇; Ǎndūlǎ perhaps Abdullah) (Note: Earlier scholarship transcribed 俺都喇 as "Yen-tu-la". In the 1489 and 1512 inscriptions, this 俺/Yen represents a family name which was later changed to Zhao by imperial favour. 俺 is to be read Ǎn. The character has a variant pronunciation yàn, which may account for the earlier transcription as yen. One suggestion is that rather than the Moslem "Abdullah", the Chinese may have represented an original Hamdullah(i) (Leslie 1962, pp. 352–353).) and a certain Lieh-wei (列微; Liè wēi), (Note: Alternatively written Li wei(利未: Lì-wèi) in the 1489 and 1679 inscriptions (Löwenthal 1947, p. 103).) probably transcribing Levi, who is described as the Wu-ssu-ta (五思達; Wǔsīdá) of the community. This last term probably is a phonetic rendering of the Persian word ustad, ("master", religious leader), and "rabbi" in a Jewish context in that language.

According to Irene Eber, among others, believe that the Jews must have settled in this Song dynasty capital city of Kaifeng, then also known as Bianjing, no later than 1120, some years before the Song-Jin alliance broke down. In 1163, the synagogue of Kaifeng city was established. The 1489 stele speaks of its establishment coinciding with the first year of the Longxing (隆興; Lóngxīng) era of the Song emperor Xiaozong (孝宗; Xiàozōng), namely 1161, which sets the synagogue's establishment in the first year of the reign of the Jurchen Emperor Jin Shizong (金世宗; Jīn Shìzōng), within whose territory Kaifeng lay. If the city was Jurchen, it is asked, why does the stele associate its foundation with the Song?

Recently, Peng Yu has challenged the Song-entry consensus, favouring instead a variant of the "second wave" theory of Kaifeng Jewish origins, one version of which holds that Jews probably figured among the large number of peoples collectively known as the Semu (色目人; sèmùrén) who were captured during Mongol campaigns in the West and conveyed east to serve in the bureaucracy and assist the Mongols in administering China after its conquest. The two names associated in 1489 with the establishment of the synagogue in 1163, An-du-la and Lieh-wei (namely Abdullah and Levi), are in Yu's interpretation retrodated from later times. An-du-la, on the basis of the 1679 stele, he reads as the religious name of the An Cheng (俺誠; Ǎn Chéng), said to be a Kaifeng Jewish physician, who "restored" the synagogue in 1421 (not 1163). (Note: Ǎn Chéng two years later, in 1423, received, the surname Zhao (趙: Zhào) conferred as an imperial memorial for his meritorious services, together with the rank of rank of Military Commissioner in the Embroidered Uniform Guard (錦衣公: Jǐnyīgōng). Thereafter he was known as Zhao Cheng (趙誠:Zhào Chéng). This is almost identical to a passage in the Ming biography of the Emperor at that time Yong-le (永樂: Yǒnglè (reigned 1402 to 1424), where mention is made of a Henan soldier, An San (俺三: Ǎn Sān), (Note: It has been conjectured that the Chinese name may originally have transcribed the Arabic name Hassan (Eber 1993, p. 236; Leslie 1972, p. 26).) who was promoted within the same Embroidered Uniform Guard and had the same surname bestowed on him in 1421 in recognition for acting as an informer concerning the treasonous designs of the Prince of Zhou, namely Zhu Su (朱橚: Zhū Sù). Fang Chao-ying (房兆楹: Fáng Zhào-yíng) had identified in 1965 the Kaifeng Jewish physician with this An San, an identification endorsed by Leslie (Yu 2017, pp. 378–379, 383–384Leslie 1967, p. 138).) According to the Diary of the Defence of Pien, (Note: 守汴日志: Shǒubiàn rìzhì) the Kaifeng Jewish Li/Levi clan, from whose ranks some 14 manla or synagogue leaders were drawn, only arrived in Kaifeng after relocating from Beijing during the Hung Wu period (1368–1398) of the Ming dynasty.

Yu's Yuan-entry theory claims that the Kaifeng Jews entered China together with the Muslim Hui-hui people during the Mongol Yuan dynasty. The Jews themselves were defined as a Hui people, due to similarities between Jewish and Islamic traditions. They were called blue hat Hui (藍帽回回; lánmào huíhuí) as opposed to the "white cap Hui" (白帽回回; báimào huíhuí), who were Muslims. (Note: The term Huihui actually has a broader, more general denotation, referring to several peoples from Central and Western Asia (西域: Xīyù). Orthodox Christians for example were called "green-eyed Huihui", and Huihui was also used of Nestorians, Greeks and others (Yin 2008, p. 190).) Chinese sources do not mention the existence of Chinese Jews until the Mongol Yuan dynasty.

The explanation for these contradictions within the various stelae must lie, Yu thinks, in the impact of Ming imperial policies aiming to constrain peoples such as the Semu, who came en masse with the Mongols peoples, to assimilate to the culture of the revived Han hegemony. The dynasty was marked by a distinct anti-foreign sentiment expressed in coercive decrees that enforced assimilation, and therefore, Yu infers, the Kaifeng Jews, under the Ming, claimed in their monumental stone inscriptions that their roots in China were ancient, going back at least to the nativist Song if not indeed to the Han period. (Note: It is occasionally repeated in the literature that the Kaifeng Jews dated their arrival to the Zhou dynasty. This arose as the result of a misreading of a mistranslation of the relevant stele by White (Leslie 1962, p. 354).) The stele sought to assert proof of a long accommodation by Jews to Chinese civilization in order to avoid discriminatory measures.

=== The early Kaifeng community ===
Kaifeng was a cosmopolitan industrial metropolis with 600,000 to a million inhabitants in Northern Song times, which formed an intense hub for overland trade via the Silk Road and the commercial riverine networks connecting it to the eastern seaboard. Through it vast amounts of grain tribute also passed. Its strategic importance and wealth were recognized by successive dynastic powers over the period 905–959, such as the Liang (who gave it its present name), Jin, Later Han and Later Zhou who all made it their capital, as did the Northern Song when they unified the empire, until the city was conquered by the Jurchen in 1127. Under siege, it surrendered to the Mongols in 1233. It would have been attractive to Persian Jewish merchants. The founding colony's members may have specialized in the manufacturing, dyeing, or pattern printing of cotton fabrics. By the early 16th century, an inscription mentions not only craftsmen, farmers and traders among them, but also scholars, physicians and officials, political and administrative, as well as military men in important posts.

A Ming emperor conferred eight surnames upon the Jews. Other evidence points to 70–73 surnames. (Note: "Because the narratives in the various stelae differ, so we have the followers of the religion in Kaifeng having '70 surnames,' '73 surnames,' and 'Seven Surnames and Eight Families'." (Kong 2017, p. 172)) The late 1672 inscription states that at the synagogue's inception (1163) there were 73 clans (姓; xìng) and 500 families (家; jiā) in the Kaifeng Jewish community. The Hongzhi stele (1489) (弘治碑; hóngzhìbēi) registers the names of 14 clans.

- Ài (艾) (Heb.עי)
- Shí (石) (Heb.שי)
- Gāo (高)
- Mù (穆)
- Bái (白)
- Huáng (黄)
- Zhào (赵/趙) (Heb.שה)
- Zhōu (周)
- Zuǒ (左)
- Niè (聂/聶)
- Jin (金) (Heb.גין)
- Lǐ (李) (Heb.לי)
- Ǎn (俺)
- Zhāng (張) (Heb.גן)

Leaders among this community were called manla (暪喇; mánlǎ), a term usually explained as a loanword from Arabic mullah. It has been suggested however that it may well have been a phonetic transcription of the Hebrew ma'lā (מעלה) "the honourable". (Note: "This fits the Chinese pronunciation far better – the Hebrew gutteral ayin (ע) could easily have been converted into the Chinese nasal final n. Moreover, according to Professor Rabin, the term ma'lā was used to refer to honoured members of the community by the Jews of eastern countries of the time concerned and meant 'the honourable, your highness'." (Leslie 1962, pp. 351–352, 352))

The Persian rubrics of the Kaifeng Jewish liturgy are written in the Bukharan dialect and the Bukharan Jews believe that in the past, some of their kin migrated to China and ceased to have contact with their country of origin. Many of the known Hebrew names of the Kaifeng Jews were only found among Persian and Babylonian Jews. Jewish written sources do not mention how the Jews arrived in Kaifeng, though a legend says that they arrived by land on the Silk Road.

Some Jesuit reports inaccurately stated the Kaifeng Jews did not intermarry. The Ming dynasty (1368–1644), in reaction to the foreign dynasty it replaced, laid down a policy of discrimination against foreigners, such as the resident Mongols and Semu. Laws regarding ethnic endogamy were issued that forbade members of such communities from marrying within their own groups. They were at liberty to marry only Han Chinese. Failure to do so would lead to enslavement. To what degree these measures were applied is unknown, but is evident from their Memorial Book that intermarriage took place on a large scale among the Kaifeng Jews certainly from Ming and it may be assumed, in Qing times. From the 19th century onwards it became the norm. They followed the Chinese custom of foot binding. (Note: Kaifeng played a pivotal role in the diffusion of this often frowned-on practice, which arose among the Southern Tang whose court supposedly prized a small-footed dancer. When they were deported by the Northern Song to Kaifeng, the practice took root there. After the fall of Kaifeng, the Song continued the custom in their new capital at Hangzhou (Adshead 1997, p. 99).) The custom of the levirate marriage was retained, and polygamy was practiced: one Kaifeng Jew, the Zhang (張) clan's Zhang Mei, is recorded in the Memorial Book as having six wives, while Jin Rong-Zhang from the Jin clan (金) had five. (Note: "No one seems to have seriously questioned the permissibility of the Kaifeng Jews marrying more than one wife." (Baron 1952, p. 617))

Towards the end of the Ming period, calculations based on the community's memorial book suggest that the Kaifeng Jewish community amounted to some 4,000 people. The catastrophic flood of 1642 brought about a precipitous drop in their population as the Flood killed 3000 Jews. The flood also destroyed the synagogue. Considerable efforts were made to save the scriptures. One man of the Gao clan, Gao Xuan, dove repeatedly into the flooded synagogue to rescue what he could and afterward all seven clans helped restore and rewrite the 13 scrolls. They obtained some from Ningxia and Ningbo to replace them, and another Hebrew Torah scroll was bought from a Muslim in Ningqiangzhou (in Shaanxi), who acquired it from a dying Jew at Canton. (Note: reference="They were again deprived of their books by a fire, and the loss was in part supplied by the purchase of a roll of the Law from a Mohammedan at Ning-keang-chow (ed. note =寧羌州: níng qiāng zhōu) in Shen-se, who had received it by legacy from a dying Israelite at Canton, and from this Hebrew roll they were able to make several copies." (Wylie 1864, p. 48))

=== Religious practices and beliefs ===
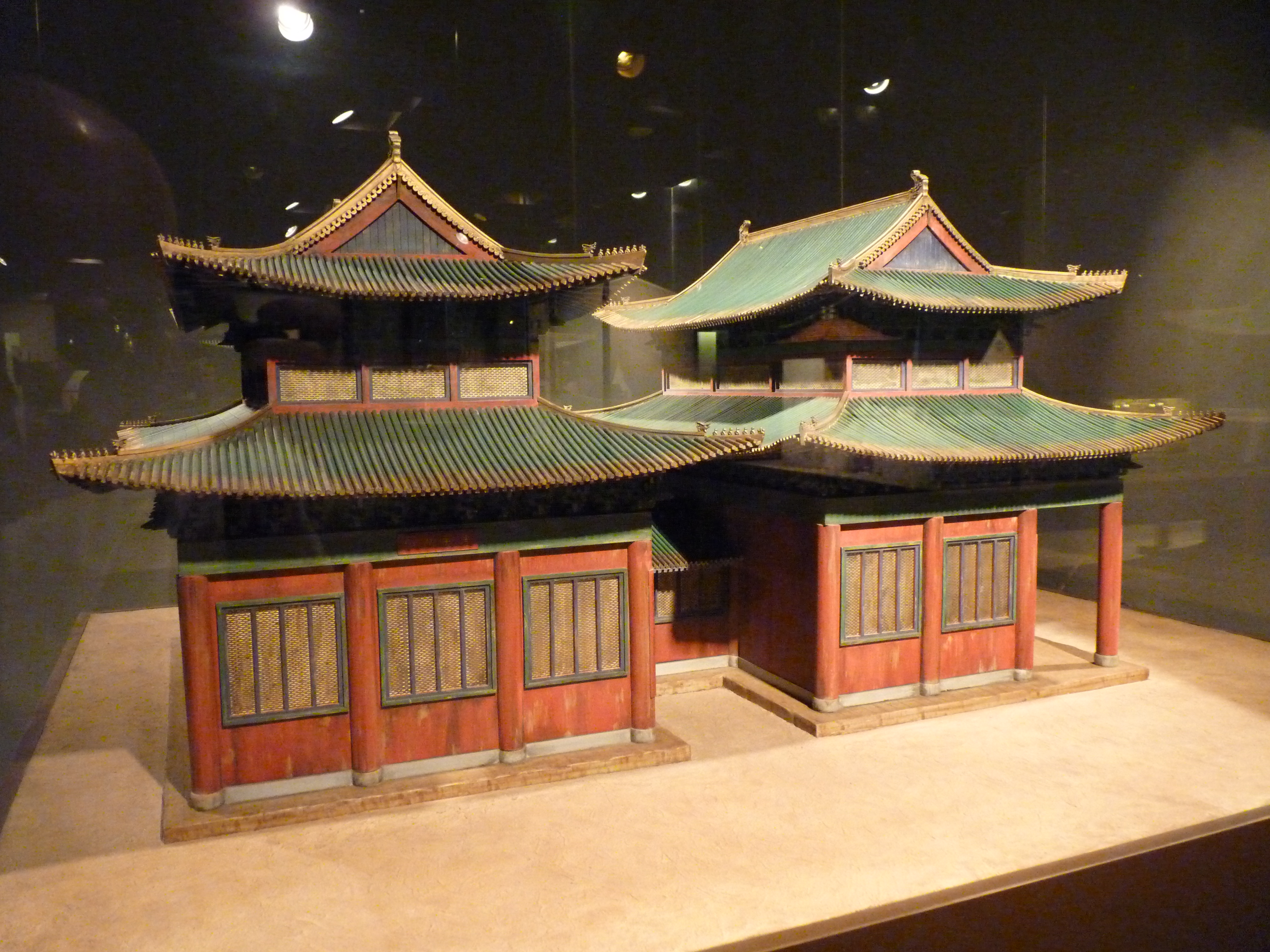
A model of the Kaifeng synagogue at the Diaspora Museum, Tel Aviv

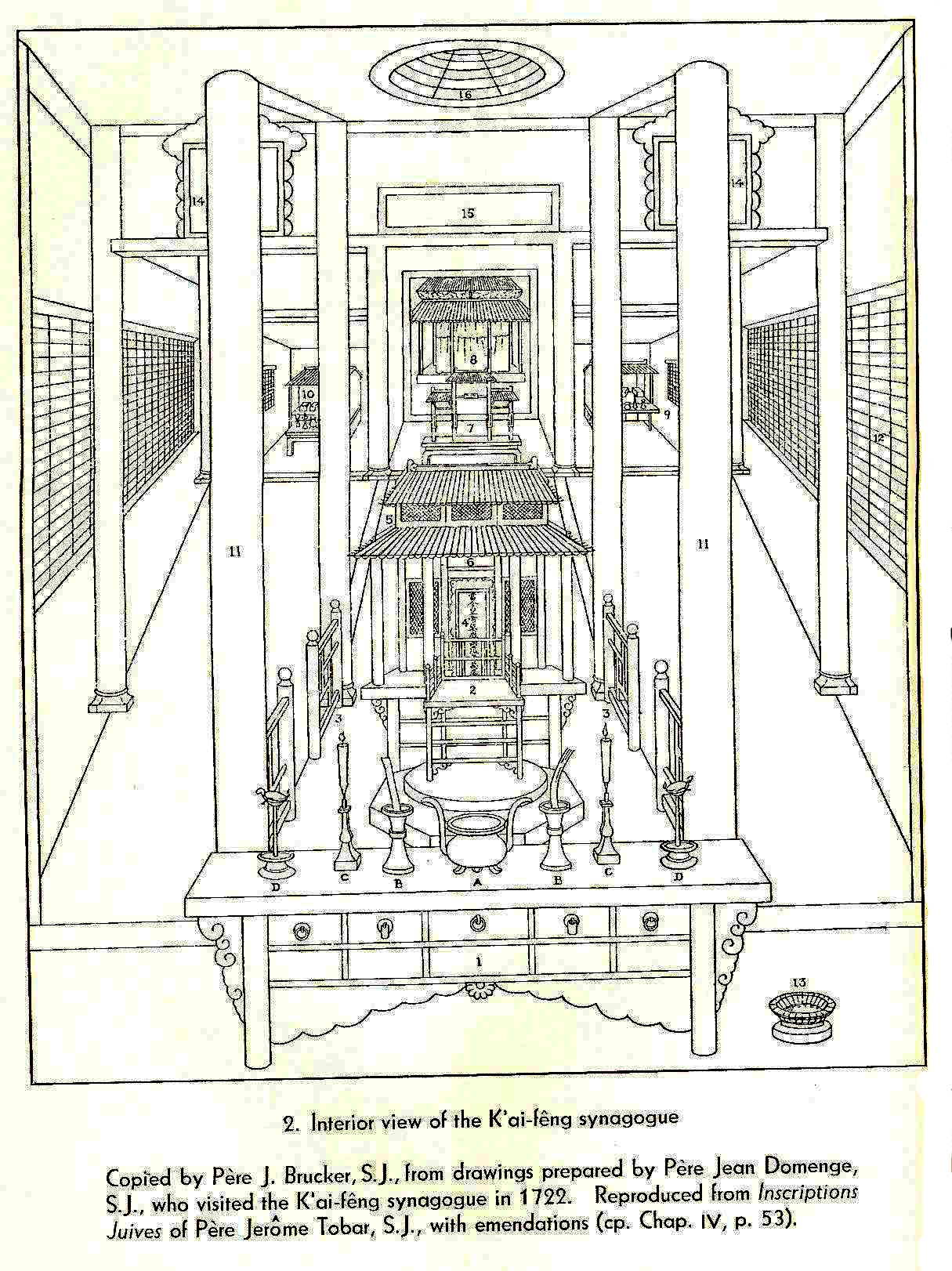
Interior of the Kaifeng synagogue, 18th century

When Kaifeng Jews introduced themselves to the Jesuits in 1605, they called themselves members of the house of "Israel" (一賜樂業; Yīcìlèyè) (Note: From the romanization given by Löwenthal, issuloye, it would appear he preferred the alternative pronunciation for the character 賜, namely sì,, which would yield Yīsìlèyè. (Löwenthal 1947, p. 101)) The Jesuits also noted that a Chinese exonym (Note: "The Jesuit Jean-Paul Gozani.. wrote in 1704 that the '...idolators first gave them this name [T'iao-chin chiao]'." (Eber 1993, p. 239)) labelled them as Tiao jin jiao, "the sect that plucks the sinews" (挑筋教; Tiāojīn jiào). (Note: Löwenthal also notes the variants "Sinew-plucking Huihui" (挑筋回回:Tiāojīn huíhuí and 刁筋教:Diāojīn jiào.) This term arose from observing that, in memory of Jacob's wrestling with the angel, their butchers extracted the sciatic nerve (Gid hanasheh) as required in Nikkur, marking them as distinct from Muslims who otherwise, like them, also refrained from eating pork.

The evidence on the stelae shows that they identified the emergence of Judaism as coinciding with the early Zhou dynasty (c. 1046–256 BCE, in modern reckoning). Abraham (阿無羅漢; Āwúluóhàn) was recorded as wakening as from sleep to the 19th generation from Pangu (Note: Pangu (盤古:Pángǔ), identified or conflated with Adam in the 1489 inscription, was the mythical first being of Chinese cosmology. In the 1663 inscription, instead, Adam is depicted as a descendant of Pangu. Likewise, Noah was rendered, in a similar assimilative manner, as Nüwa (女媧:Nǚwā), the name for a Chinese goddess of creation remembered in myth for her intervention in staying a great flood that threatened mankind. (Löwenthal 1947, pp. 100–101).)-Adam (阿躭; Ādān), and grasping profound mysteries, founded Judaism. This is said to have occurred in the 146th year of the Zhou dynasty (i.e., 977 BCE). The floruit of Moses (乜攝; Miēshè) in turn is set in the 613th year of the same dynasty, namely around 510 BCE.

In their prayers and liturgy, the traditional community followed Talmudic usage, celebrating all the Jewish festivals, observing the prayers, rituals and days of fasting variously associated with the Jewish Sabbath, Yom Kippur, Rosh Hashanah, Passover, Shavuot, Sukkot, Hanukkah, Purim and Tisha B'Av. Within a few centuries, nonetheless, practices regarding the coming of age ceremony, wedding and death and burial were acclimatized to the respective Chinese customs, though the text of the Kaddish in the Memorial Book suggests the prayer was recited at funerals. By sometime after the mid 19th century all of these practices appear to have been abandoned, including the observance of the Sabbath. (Note: The source for the data on current observances recorded by Aaron Halevi Fink, dated to 1850, is problematical (Leslie & Pollak 1998, pp. 54–81).)

Outside the synagogue was a large hall, the Tz'u t'ang (祖堂; zǔ táng) or "Hall of the Ancestors" where, according to the Portuguese Jesuit Jean-Paul Gozani (1647–1732) who lived in Kaifeng from 1698 to 1718, incense bowls were placed to commemorate the patriarchs and outstanding figures of the Law, as well as various holy men (聖人; shèngrén). This was similar to Chinese rites regarding ancestors, with the difference that no images were allowed. Their Pentateuch was divided into 53 sections according to the Persian style.

=== The Jesuits ===
The existence of Jews in China was unknown to Europeans until 1605, when Matteo Ricci, then established in Beijing, was visited by a Chinese official from Kaifeng. (Note: "The reasons for Ai Tian's journey are not stated; possibly his visit was connected with his official duties; possibly he may have undertaken it in the hope of securing promotion in the civil service." (Loewe 1988, p. 3)) According to the account in De Christiana expeditione apud Sinas, Ricci's visitor, named Ai Tian (艾田; Ài Tián), was a chüren (舉人; jǔrén) – someone who had passed the provincial level of the imperial examination decades earlier in 1573. Ai Tian explained that he was a member of a 1,000 strong Israelite congregation that worshipped one God. They were unfamiliar with the word "Jew" (yóutài) (Note: In his c. 1366 Nancun Chuogeng Lu, the Yuan and Ming-era scholar Tao Zongyi noted 31 ethnic groups as belonging to the Semu, the second rank of the Mongol four-class system: (a) Mongols, (b) Semu, (c) Han, including the Jurchen Jin, and (d) the people of Dali and Koreans. Jews do not figure there, but there are several names in the third class that look like a reference to them, such as the Zhuyin-dai (竹因歹, Zhúyīndǎi), the Zhuyi-dai (竹亦歹, Zhúyìdǎi), and the Zhuwen (竹温, Zhúwēn). In Mongolian, dai signifies "people", hence the suspicion by Yin Gang that this is an ethnonym marker for Jews (Judah). Unfortunately there is no evidence that might allow one to assert that the three terms denote an ethnic group (Yin 2008, p. 190).) which, according to Zhang Ligang, first appeared in the 1820s when a German missionary used this translated name of "Jews Country" in a journal. (Note: Kaifeng Jews only adopted the term Yóutàirén in the 20th century (Eber 1993, p. 239).) When he saw a Christian image of The Madonna, Mary with Jesus and John the Baptist, he took it to be a representation of Rebecca with her children Jacob and Esau.

Ai said that many other Jews resided in Kaifeng; they had a splendid synagogue (礼拜寺; Lǐbàisì), and possessed a great number of written materials and books. Ricci wrote that "his face was quite different to that of a Chinese in respect to his nose, his eyes, and all his features". This has been taken to allow an inference that, up to that time, the Kaifeng Jews had still largely shunned intermixing and were thus physically distinguishable from the surrounding population. About three years after Ai's visit, Ricci sent a Chinese Jesuit lay brother to visit Kaifeng; he copied the beginnings and ends of the holy books kept in the synagogue, which allowed Ricci to verify that they indeed were the same texts as the Pentateuch known to Europeans, except that they did not use Hebrew diacritics (which were a comparatively late invention).

When Ricci wrote to the "ruler of the synagogue" in Kaifeng, telling him that the Messiah the Jews were waiting for had come already, the archsynagogus wrote back, saying that the Messiah would not come for another ten thousand years. Nonetheless, apparently concerned with the lack of a trained successor, the old rabbi offered Ricci his position, if the Jesuit would join their faith and abstain from eating pork. Later, another three Jews from Kaifeng, including Ai's nephew, stopped by the Jesuits' house while visiting Beijing on business, and got themselves baptized. They told Ricci that the old rabbi had died, and (since Ricci had not taken him up on his earlier offer), his position was inherited by his son, "quite unlearned in matters pertaining to his faith". Ricci's overall impression of the situation of China's Jewish community was that "they were well on the way to becoming Saracens [i.e., Muslims] or heathens."

Father Joseph Brucker stated that Ricci's account of Chinese Jews indicated that there were only in the range of ten or twelve Jewish families in Kaifeng in the late 16th to early 17th centuries) In the Jesuits' manuscripts it was also stated that there was a greater number of Jews in Hangzhou.

=== 19th to 20th centuries ===
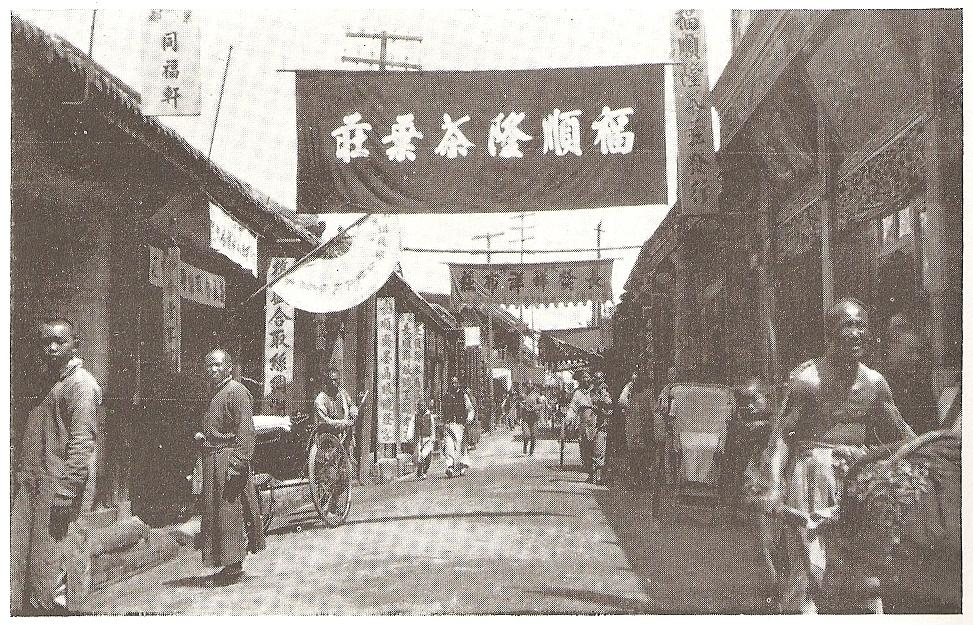
Earth Market Street, Kaifeng, 1910. The synagogue lay beyond the row of stores on the right

The Kaifeng Jewish community's isolation from other Jewish communities and marriages with Han Chinese and Islamic Chinese resulted in a decreased emphasis on Jewish identity and tradition. With some Kaifeng families, Muslim men did marry their Jewish women, while Muslim women did not marry the Jews. (Note: "Two families intermarry with Chinese Mohammedans only. The Jews give their daughters to the Mohammedans; the Mohammedans do not give their daughters to the Jews." (Xu 2003, p. 55)) (Note: "...religious strictures required anyone, whether man or woman, who married a Muslim to convert to Islam." (Yin 2001, p. 233)) In 1849, an observer who had contact with the Kaifeng Jewish community noted that "the Jews are quite Chinese in appearance." The Taiping Rebellion of the 1850s led to the dispersal of the community, but it later returned to Kaifeng. To avoid the threat of becoming defunct, the Kaifeng community dispatched members to Shanghai in order to seek help from Sephardic European Jewish merchants active there. The funds that were collected to this end were diverted to assist an influx of Russian Jews fleeing pogroms.

Shanghai's Baghdadi Jewish community attempted to instruct Kaifeng Jews in the Jewish religious teachings and ritual. The firm of S. H. Sassoon took two Kaifeng brothers in flight from the Taiping rebels under their wing and had them sent to Bombay where they underwent circumcision. One died within two years but the other, Feba, was renamed Shalem Sholome David, and was employed by the Sassoons in their Shanghai office (1872–1882). In 1883 he married a Baghdadi Jewish woman, Habiba Reuben Moses, and became a respected member of the Jewish community in Bombay. During the Boxer rebellion the Bombay community offered to subsidize the relocation of Kaifeng Jews to Shanghai.

The dismantlement of the synagogue sometime between 1850 and 1866 led to the community's demise. By the turn of the 19–20th century members of the community had fallen into dire poverty. The Zhang Kaifeng Jewish family had largely converted to Islam by this time. (Note: "Some of those who converted to Islam, like the Zhang family, still seem to cherish this past as well and consider themselves as 'fake Moslems'. This has been confirmed by Zhang Qianhong and Li Jingwen in 'Some Observations'." (Kupfer 2008, p. 18)) The site of the synagogue had turned into a fetid swamp. Much material belonging to it, even the roof tiles, was purchased by Muslims and others: two young Kaifeng Jews sold three Torahs to two Americans and an Austrian. Some property was also said to have been stolen. The Ark of the Sefer Torah was reportedly seen in a mosque. The site itself was apparently bought by Bishop White in 1914, and in 1954, the Chinese Communist government confiscated the property and built the Kaifeng Municipal Clinic (today 开封市中医院南院) on it. Some usages remained. Burial coffins maintained a distinctive shape from those customary for Chinese. (Note: S.M. Perlmann, a Shanghai businessman and scholar, wrote in 1912 that "they bury their dead in coffins, but of a different shape than those of the Chinese are made, and do not attire the dead in secular clothes as the Chinese do, but in linen." (Dawid 1999, p. 117))

Kaifeng Jewish ancestry has been found among their descendants living among the Hui Muslims. Scholars have pointed out that Hui Muslims may have absorbed Kaifeng Jews instead of Han Confucians and Buddhists. (Note: "Later, in the 19th and 20th centuries, it is likely, as suggested by many scholars, that several of the Kaifeng Jews did convert to Islam rather than simply being swallowed up in the Buddhist or Confucian multitude. Today, a number of Muslims (and possibly non-Muslims) have discovered that their ancestors were Kaifeng Jews. ... (Jin Xiaojing 金效靜, 1981) discovered she was of Jewish descent when on the hajj to Mecca." (Yin 2008, p. 194)) Kaifeng Chinese had difficulty in distinguishing Jews and Muslims, and spoke of the former as "ancient Islam" (回回古教; huíhuí gǔjiào). The blue hat Hui also referred to Jews converting to Islam. (Note: "Islamic works translated into Chinese played a very important role in the popularization of Islam. At the same time, many Jews who did not like to abandon their tradition converted to Islam and were known as the 'Huihui with blue hats. The missionary work of Christians from the beginning of the 17th century and the Chinese Bible did not affect them'." (Yin 2008, p. 196)) Jin clan descendants also came to believe they were Muslims. Instead of being absorbed into Han, a portion of the Jews of China of Kaifeng became Hui Muslims. (Note: "This also involves a difficult study of the relations that existed between the Kaifeng Jews and Muslims there. A number of Jewish descendants converted to Islam rather than melting into the general populations." (Leslie 2008, p. 48)) In 1948, Samuel Stupa Shih (Shi Hong Mo) (施洪模) said he saw a Hebrew language "Religion of Israel" Jewish inscription on a tombstone in a Qing dynasty Muslim cemetery to a place west of Hangzhou. (Note: "It is clear from Shi's later descriptions that many of the tombstones he saw were Muslim rather than Jewish, though one, he claimed, read 'Religion of Israel' in Hebrew. In Hangzhou, according to Ricci in 1608, there had been a synagogue. We can only wonder whether the Jews there had a separate cemetery of their own or were accepted by the Muslims in their special cemetery." (Leslie 2008, p. 50))

By Ricci's time, it is said that the Nanjing and Beijing Jews had become Muslims, though a Jewish community and synagogue still existed in Hangzhou.

=== Post World War II ===
The Kaifeng Jews are not recognized as a minority among the 55 ethnic groups which have been granted this official status in China. Their bid to be so listed in 1953 was turned down by the Chinese government. Their registration as "Jewish descendants" (猶太後代; Yóutàihòudài) was changed to Han Chinese (漢; Hàn) out of official concerns that an ethnic status might lead them to seek privileges. What little remains of their material Jewish heritage has been locked away by Chinese authorities in a special room in the Kaifeng museum, ostensibly for the protection of their heritage or is conserved in the Dongda mosque (東大寺; Dōngdàsì), where the relics are inaccessible. Family papers and heirlooms were reportedly discarded or burnt out of fear of the Red Guards during the Chinese Cultural Revolution.

In 1980 during a hajj pilgrimage the Hui Muslim woman Jin Xiaojing (金效靜) realized she had Jewish roots. The Portland Rabbi Joshua Stampfer (1921–2019), on a visit to Kaifeng in 1983, estimated there were from 100 to 150 descendants of Kaifeng Jews, and provided the means for Jin Xiaojing's daughter, Qu Yinan, then a Beijing journalist, to study Judaism and Hebrew in California where she became the first of the Kaifeng community to be reconverted back to the religion of her ancestors. Qu Yinan's family abstained from certain foods, such as shellfish and pork, similar to the stipulations of kosher dietary law, which marked them off from most neighbouring Chinese. She had been under the impression her family was Muslim, who likewise abstain from pork, and her grandfather, like them, had worn a skullcap, only blue as opposed to the white cap worn donned by local Muslims.

Writing in 1987 Daniel Elazar suggested it would be difficult to maintain that contemporary Kaifeng Chinese of Jewish descent are Jews. Proposals to establish a Museum commemorating their history despite the city's lack of Jewish artifacts and documents, have received enthusiastic local government backing, which considers that such a centre would have positive effects on the local economy via Jewish tourism. Elazar opines that, over the ensuing decades, Western Jews will manage to encourage the growth of Chinese Jews among the descendant population (Note: "this observer would hazard a guess that some of these 500 Kaifeng Jews will indeed become Jewish over the next several decades, because the Jews of the West will make them into Jews. Once discovered, they will be pursued in one way or another until they and their neighbors become so conscious of their 'Jewishness' that the deed will be done even if it will not be halakhically recognized." (Elazar 1987)) The establishment of diplomatic relations between China and Israel in 1992 rekindled interest in Judaism and the Jewish experience.

It is difficult to estimate the number of Jews in China, population count often having to fluctuate constantly due to changes in official attitudes. A survey in the 80s suggested 140 families in China bore six of the traditional Jewish surnames, with 79 in Kaifeng amounting to 166 individuals. The last official census revealed about 400 official Jews in Kaifeng, now estimated at some 100 families totalling approximately 500 people. Up to 1,000 residents have ties to Jewish ancestry, though only 40 to 50 individuals partake in Jewish activities.

Within the framework of contemporary rabbinic Judaism, matrilineal transmission of Jewishness is predominant, while Chinese Jews based their Jewishness on patrilineal descent. This has been attributed to the influence of Chinese cultural norms, where lines of descent are typically patrilineal. The Jewish sinologist Jordan Paper notes, however, that all genealogies in the Torah consist exclusively of male descent. The modern assumption that Judaism is matrilineal has been used, he adds, to deny the authenticity of Chinese Jews because their clan lineages were patrilineal. (Note: "The issue of lineage is important because a critique of Chinese Judaism as not being authentically Jewish is based on the fact that the clan lineages were patrilineal..Since it is now assumed by many contemporary Jews that Judaism is matrilineal, Chinese Judaism was therefore spurious and the Chinese Jews cannot really be Jews..This criticism is absurd, because the practices of the Chinese Jews in this regard were and are no different from traditional Jewish practices elsewhere...The similarity of patrilineality in both Jewish and Chinese cultures is but another way in which the two cultures were compatible." (Paper 2012, pp. 8–9))

Kaifeng Jews are not recognized as Jews by birth and are required to formally convert to Judaism in order to receive Israeli citizenship. Some desire to reconnect with Judaism and some say their parents and grandparents told them that they were Jewish and would one day "return to their land". Under Israel's Law of Return, aliyah requires proof of Jewish descent through at least one grandparent. Though such evidence is not available for the Kaifeng community, and strict Orthodox Jewish rabbis would question their authenticity as Jews, Shavei Israel's Michael Freund has sponsored for over a decade (2006–2016) the emigration of 19 descendants of Kaifeng Jews to Israel, where they have studied variously Hebrew in ulpanim and a yeshiva in preparation for conversion to Judaism.

In the 21st century, both the Sino-Judaic Institute and Shavei Israel sent teachers to Kaifeng to help interested community members learn about their Jewish heritage, building on the pioneering work of the American Judeo-Christian Timothy Lerner. Advocates for the descendants of the Kaifeng Jews are exploring ways to convince the Chinese authorities to recognize the antiquity of the Kaifeng Jews and allow them to practice their Chinese Jewish way of life. Since 2015, descendants of the Kaifeng Jews have come under increased pressure and suspicion by the Chinese government.

== Kaifeng manuscripts ==
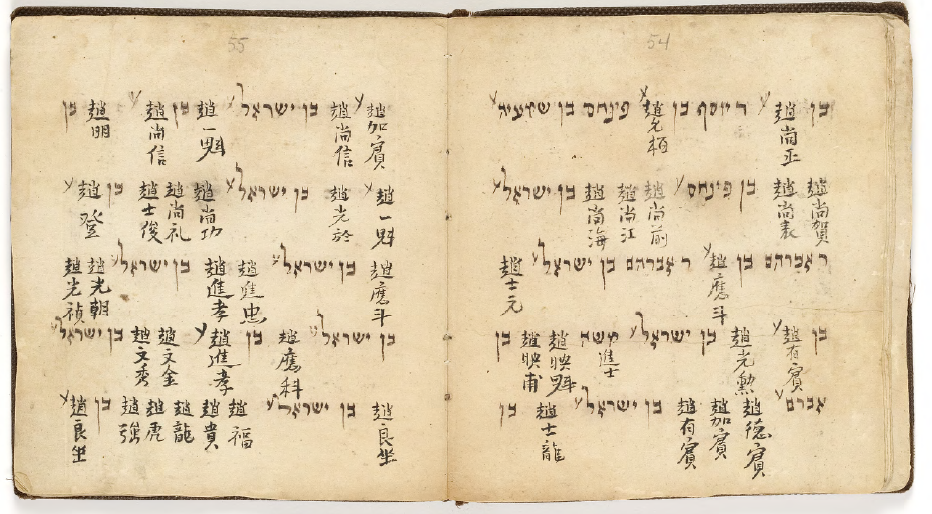
Membership list in a prayer book, in Hebrew characters (without vowel pointing) and Chinese characters, circa 17th century

Several Kaifeng Torah scrolls survive, housed in collections in the British Library and elsewhere. A number of surviving written works are housed at Hebrew Union College's Klau Library in Cincinnati, Ohio. Among the works in that collection are a siddur (a Jewish prayer book) in Chinese characters and a Hebrew codex of the Haggadah. The codex is notable in that, while it ostensibly contains vowels, it was clearly copied by someone who did not understand them. While the symbols are accurate portrayals of Hebrew vowels, they appear to be placed randomly, thereby rendering the voweled text as gibberish. Since Modern Hebrew is generally written without vowels, a literate Hebrew speaker can disregard these markings, as the consonants are written correctly, with few scribal errors.

Also at the Klau Library is a haggadah from the 17th century and another from the 18th century, one written in Jewish-Persian hand, the other in Chinese Hebrew square script (like that of the Torah scrolls), using text primarily from an early stage of the Persian Jewish rite. A recent study of the text has a facsimile of one manuscript and a sample of the other, the full text of the Hebrew/Aramaic and Judeo-Persian haggadah (in Hebrew characters), as well as an annotated English translation.

=== Assessments ===
Xun Zhou, a research fellow at SOAS expressed doubts about the authenticity of the Kaifeng community, arguing that it was a construct of Christian-driven Orientalism, powered by the evangelical interests of James Finn and his two works on the question: The Jews in China (1843) and The Orphan Colony of Jews in China (1874). Finn relied on the accounts of the 17th century Jesuit missionaries. Zhou maintained that the community had no Torah scrolls until 1851, when they suddenly appeared to be sold to eager Western collectors. She also stated that drawings of the synagogue were doctored in the West because the original did not look like one, and that the Kaifeng community claimed to have kept some Jewish practices since before they are known to have begun. Xun Zhou posited that the Kaifeng community was not Jewish in any meaningful sense. Her hypothesis has not found support within the scholarly community. (Note: "it is impossible to deny that the Jewish community did exist." (Yu 2017, p. 374))

In an overview of the place of Kaifeng Jews within the broader context of Jewish history, Simon Schama notes its exceptionality to the tragic diffidence of host societies to Jewish settlements:-

To survey the predicament of Jews in much of the rest of the world is to marvel at what the Kaifeng community escaped. In China, Jews were not subjected to violence and persecution, not demonized as God killers. Their synagogues were not invaded by conversionary harangues. They were not physically segregated from non-Jews nor forced to wear humiliating forms of identification on their dress. They were not forced into the most despised and vulnerable occupations, not stigmatized as grasping and vindictive, and portrayed neither as predatory monsters nor pathetic victims. (Note: "The Chinese Jews had not undergone the many centuries of suffering that European Jews had endured under Christianity, nor had they experienced the second-class citizenship of Jews in Muslim countries. Instead, for nearly a millennium they existed in an atmosphere of tolerance, indeed of complete acceptance, and they not only maintained a traditional Jewish life but adapted to a Chinese one as well."; "the Jews of Kaifeng and the Jews of Cochin never experienced anti-Semitism, making them unique among the world's Jews.")

== Genetics ==
Evidence garnered from testing the Y-chromosome of members of the Kaifeng Jewish community shows their genetic relationship to Mizrahi Jewish groups.

== Books and films ==
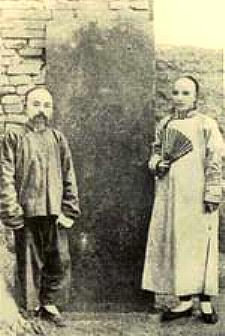
Kaifeng Jews, National Geographic, 1907

=== Literary references ===
The American novelist Pearl S. Buck, raised in China and fluent in Chinese, set one of her historical novels (Peony) in a Chinese Jewish community. The novel deals with the cultural forces which are gradually eroding the separate identity of the Jews, including intermarriage. The title character, the Chinese bondmaid Peony, loves her master's son, David ben Ezra, but she cannot marry him due to her lowly status. He eventually marries a high-class Chinese woman, to the consternation of his mother, who is proud of her unmixed heritage. Descriptions of remnant names, such as a "Street of the Plucked Sinew", and descriptions of customs such as refraining from the eating of pork, are prevalent throughout the novel.

The Broadway musical Chu Chem is a fictional tale that revolves around the Kaifeng Jewish community. In the show, a group of European actors joins a troupe of Chinese performers in order to present the story of Chu Chem, a scholar who journeys to Kaifeng with his wife Rose and his daughter Lotte because he wants to learn about his ancestors and find a husband for Lotte.

=== Documentary films ===
In his 1992 documentary series Legacy, writer Michael Wood traveled to Kaifeng and walked down a small lane known as the "alley of the sect who teach the Scriptures", that is, the alley of the Jews. He mentioned that there are still Jews in Kaifeng today, but they are reluctant to reveal themselves "in the current political climate". The documentary's companion book further states that one can still see a "mezuzah on the door frame, and the candelabrum in the living room". A recent documentary, Minyan in Kaifeng, covers the present-day Kaifeng Jewish community in China during a trip to Kaifeng which was taken by Jewish expatriates who met for weekly Friday night services in Beijing; upon learning about the Jews of Kaifeng, the members of the expatriate Jewish community decided to travel to Kaifeng in order to meet some of the descendants of the Kaifeng Jews and hold a Shabbat service.

== See also ==
- East Asian Jews
- History of the Jews in China
- Israelis in China

== Sources ==
- Adshead, S.A.M. (1997). Material Culture in Europe and China, 1400–1800: The Rise of Consumerism. Palgrave Macmillan. ISBN 978-1-349-25762-1.
- Baron, Salo Wittmayer (1952). A Social and Religious History of the Jews: Late Middle Ages and the era of European expansion, 1200-1650. Columbia University Press. ISBN 978-0-231-08838-1.
- Ben-Canaan, Dan (2009). The Jewish People and Their Place in History - The Jews of China and Harbin (Report). Harbin Municipal Government; Harbin Tourism Bureau.
- Berg, Irwin M. (Winter 2000). "Among the Jewish Descendants of Kaifeng" (PDF). Judaism: A Quarterly Journal of Jewish Life and Thought.
- Berg, Irwin M. (2008). "Review: The Kaifeng Stone Inscriptions: The Legacy of the Jewish Community in Ancient China By Tiberiu Weisz (iUniverse, 2006)". Kulanu. Archived from the original on 27 September 2011.
- Bitton, Rebecca (24 August 2010). "Kaifeng Jews study in Israeli yeshiva". Yedioth Ahronoth.
- Borjian, Habib (2017). "Judeo-Iranian languages". In Kahn, Lily; Rubin, Aaron D. (eds.). Handbook of Jewish Languages. BRILL. pp. 234–297. ISBN 978-9-004-34577-5.
- Braun, Eli. "China Virtual Jewish History Tour". Jewish Virtual Library.
- Buckley, Chris (24 September 2016b). "Chinese Jews of Ancient Lineage Huddle Under Pressure". The New York Times. Archived from the original on 4 August 2024.
- Buckley, Chris (25 September 2016a). "Jewish and Chinese: Explaining a Shared Identity". The New York Times.
- Burke, Sarah; Jabari, Lawahez (2 March 2016). "Chinese Kaifeng Jews Seek New Lives in Israel". NBC News.
- Calcote, Steven; Shulman, Jonathan; Nimoy, Leonard (2002). "Minyan in Kaifeng: A Modern Journey to an Ancient Chinese Jewish Community". National Center for Jewish Film.
- Chazanov, Mathis (8 December 1985). "'I thought we were Muslims because we never ate pork' – Qu Yinan: Chinese Jew Comes to U.S. to Trace Roots". Los Angeles Times.
- Chen, Changqi (2001) [First published 1984]. "Buddhist Monk or Jewish Rabbi?". In Shapiro, Sidney (ed.). Jews in Old China: Studies by Chinese Scholars. Hippocrene Books. pp. 139–142. ISBN 978-0-781-80833-0.
- Chen, Yuan (1981). "Study of the Israelite Religion". In Wu, Z. (ed.). Selected Historical Essays by Chen Yuan. Shanghai: Shanghai People's Publishing House. pp. 84–85.
- "Chinese Writer Studies Jewish Roots". The New York Times. 18 June 1985. p. 12.
- Chong, Key Ray (2013) [First published 2000]. "Kaifeng". In Friedman, John Block; Figg, Kristen Mossler (eds.). Trade, Travel, and Exploration in the Middle Ages: An Encyclopedia. Routledge. p. 315. ISBN 978-1-135-59094-9.
- Dawid, Heinz (1999). "From Berlin To Tianjin". In Goldstein, Jonathan (ed.). The Jews of China. A Sourcebook and Research Guide. Vol. 2. M. E. Sharpe. pp. 110–119. ISBN 978-0-765-60105-6.
- Demsky, Aaron (2003). "Some Reflections on the Names of the Jews of Kaifeng China" (PDF). In Demsky, Aaron (ed.). These Are the Names: Studies in Jewish Onomastics. Vol. 4. Ramat Gan: Bar-Ilan University Press. pp. 91–108. ISBN 978-965-226-267-7.
- Des Forges, Roger V. (2003). Cultural Centrality and Political Change in Chinese History: Northeast Henan in the Fall of the Ming. Stanford University Press. ISBN 978-0-804-74044-9.
- Eber, Irene (1993). "K'aifeng Jews Revisited: Sinification as Affirmation of Identity". Monumenta Serica. 41: 231–247. doi:10.1080/02549948.1993.11731245. JSTOR 40726975.
- Eckstein, Matthew A. (2017). "Identity Discourse and the Chinese-Jewish Descendants". In Laytner, Anson H.; Paper, Jordan (eds.). The Chinese Jews of Kaifeng: A Millennium of Adaptation and Endurance. Lexington Books. pp. 179–200. ISBN 978-1-498-55027-7.
- Ehrlich, M. Avrum; Pingan, Liang (2008). "The Contemporary Condition of the Jewish descendants of Kaifeng". In Ehrlich, M. Avrum (ed.). The Jewish-Chinese Nexus: A Meeting of Civilizations. Routledge. ISBN 978-0-415-45715-6.
- Elazar, Daniel J. (1987). "Are There Really Jews in China?: An Update". Jerusalem Center for Public Affairs.
- Finn, James (1872). The Orphan Colony of Jews in China. London: James Nisbet & Co.
- Freund, Michael (8 August 2015). "From Kaifeng to the Kotel: Chinese Jews in Jerusalem". The Jerusalem Post.
- Freund, Michael (8 September 2016). "Stopping the crackdown on China's Jews: There is no excuse for Israel to be turning its back on Kaifeng Jewry". The Jerusalem Post.
- "From Kaifeng to kibbutzim". The Jerusalem Post. 22 October 2009.
- Gabow, Leo (2017) [First published 2000]. "Jewish Property in Kaifeng". In Malek, Roman (ed.). From Kaifeng to Shanghai: Jews in China. Routledge. pp. 117–124. ISBN 978-1-351-56628-5.
- "Haggadah with Judeo-Persian translation". HUC Rare book and manuscript collection.
- Haim, Ofir (2021). "The Islamic East". In Lieberman, Phillip I (ed.). Jews in the Medieval Islamic World. The Cambridge History of Judaism. Vol. 5. Cambridge University Press. pp. 332–368. doi:10.1017/9781139048873.014. ISBN 978-1-009-03859-1.
- Katz, Nathan (May 1995). "The Judaisms of Kaifeng and Cochin: Parallel and Divergent Styles of Religious Acculturation". Numen. 42 (2): 118–140. doi:10.1163/1568527952598594. JSTOR 3270171.
- Kong, Xianyi (2017). "Delving into the Israelite Religion of Kaifeng: The Patriotic Scholar Shi Jingyun and his 'Study of the Origins of the Plucking the Sinews Sect of Henan'". In Laytner, Anson H.; Paper, Jordan (eds.). The Chinese Jews of Kaifeng: A Millennium of Adaptation and Endurance. Lexington Books. pp. 165–178. ISBN 978-1-498-55027-7.
- Kupfer, Peter (2008). "The Perception and Self-Perception of Jewishness in Kaifeng in the Past and Present". In Kupfer, Peter (ed.). Youtai - Presence and Perception of Jews and Judaism in China. Peter Lang. pp. 7–22. ISBN 978-3-631-57533-8.
- Laytner, Anson (2008). "The Judaism of the Kaifeng Jews and Liberal Judaism in America". In Ehrlich, M. Avrum (ed.). The Jewish-Chinese Nexus: A Meeting of Civilizations. Routledge. ISBN 978-0-415-45715-6.
- Laytner, Anson (2011). "China". In Baskin, Judith R. (ed.). The Cambridge Dictionary of Judaism and Jewish Culture. Cambridge University Press. pp. 100–102. ISBN 978-0-521-82597-9.
- Laytner, Anson (2017). "Between Survival and Revival: The Impact of Western Jewish Interaction on Kaifeng-Jewish Identity". In Laytner, Anson H.; Paper, Jordan (eds.). The Chinese Jews of Kaifeng: A Millennium of Adaptation and Endurance. Lexington Books. pp. 213–245. ISBN 978-1-498-55027-7.
- Laytner, Anson H.; Paper, Jordan (2017). "Introduction". In Laytner, Anson H.; Paper, Jordan (eds.). The Chinese Jews of Kaifeng: A Millennium of Adaptation and Endurance. Lexington Books. pp. i–xix. ISBN 978-1-498-55027-7.
- Leslie, Donald (July–September 1962). "Some Notes on the Jewish Inscriptions of K'aifeng". Journal of the American Oriental Society. 82 (3): 346–361. doi:10.2307/597646. JSTOR 597646.
- Leslie, Donald (1967). "The K'aifeng Jew Chao Ying-ch'eng and His Family". T'oung Pao. 53 (1–3): 147–179. doi:10.1163/156853267X00025. JSTOR 4527667.
- Leslie, Donald (1972). The Survival of the Chinese Jews: The Jewish Community of Kaifeng. BRILL. ISBN 978-9-004-03413-6.
- Leslie, Donald (2008). "Jews and Judaism in Traditional China: Prospects for Research". In Kupfer, Peter (ed.). Youtai - Presence and Perception of Jews and Judaism in China. Peter Lang. pp. 23–54. ISBN 978-3-631-57533-8.
- Leslie, Donald Daniel; Pollak, Michael (1998). "The Fink/Liebermann Visit to the Kaifeng Jews". Bibliography and Booklore. 20: 54–81. JSTOR 27943552.
- Loewe, Michael (1988). "The Jewish Presence in Imperial China". Jewish Historical Studies. 30: 1–20. JSTOR 29779835.
- Löwenthal, Rudolf (1947). "The Nomenclature of Jews in China". Monumenta Serica. 12: 97–126. doi:10.1080/02549948.1947.11744892. JSTOR 40726671.
- Meyer, Maisie J. (2008). "Baghdadi Jews, Chinese "Jews" and Chinese". In Kupfer, Peter (ed.). Youtai - Presence and Perception of Jews and Judaism in China. Peter Lang. pp. 155–184. ISBN 978-3-631-57533-8.
- Okuma, Taryn L. (Spring 2008). "Jews in China and American Discourses of Identity in Pearl S. Buck's "Peony"". Tulsa Studies in Women's Literature. 27 (1): 115–139. doi:10.1353/tsw.2008.a246776. JSTOR 20455354. S2CID 154044502.
- Paper, Jordan (2012). The Theology of the Chinese Jews, 1000–1850. Wilfrid Laurier University Press. ISBN 978-1-554-58404-8.
- Pfeffer, Anshel (13 June 2008). "Taking the Silk Route Back". Haaretz. Archived from the original on 24 January 2010.
- Pollak, Michael (1998) [First published 1980]. Mandarins, Jews, and Missionaries: The Jewish Experience in the Chinese Empire. Weatherhill. ISBN 978-0-834-80419-7.
- Pollak, Michael (Spring 2005). "Review: The Jews of Kaifeng, China: History, Culture, and Religion by Xu Xin". Shofar. 23 (3): 206–209. doi:10.1353/sho.2005.0118. JSTOR 42943875. S2CID 143183748.
- Pollak, Michael (2017) [First published 2000]. "The Manuscripts and Artifacts of the Synagogue of Kaifeng;: Their Peregrinations and Present Whereabouts". In Malek, Roman (ed.). From Kaifeng to Shanghai: Jews in China. Routledge. pp. 81–109. ISBN 978-1-351-56628-5.
- Rebouh, Caroline (2019). The Jews of China: History of a Community and its Perspectives. Cambridge Scholars Publishing. ISBN 978-1-527-52669-3.
- Ricci, Matteo; Trigault, Nicolas (1953). China in the Sixteenth Century: The Journals of Matthew Ricci, 1583-1610. Translated by Louis Joseph Gallagher. Random House.
- Schama, Simon (2017). Belonging: The Story of the Jews 1492–1900. The Story of the Jews. Vol. 2. Random House. ISBN 978-1-448-19066-9.
- Sharot, Stephen (Winter 2007). "The Kaifeng Jews: A Reconsideration of Acculturation and Assimilation in a Comparative Perspective". Jewish Social Studies. 13 (2): 179–203. doi:10.2979/JSS.2007.13.2.179. JSTOR 4467770. S2CID 144204664.
- Song, Xi; Campbell, Cameron D.; Lee, James Z. (June 2015). "Ancestry Matters: Patrilineage Growth and Extinction". American Sociological Review. 80 (2): 574–602. doi:10.1177/0003122415576516. PMC 4813328. PMID 27041745.
- Stern, David (Spring 2013). "Why Is This Haggadah Different?". Jewish Review of Books. Archived from the original on 26 November 2019.
- Thomas, Nigel (2017). "Râdhânites, Chinese Jews, and the Silk Road of the Steppes". In Laytner, Anson H.; Paper, Jordan (eds.). The Chinese Jews of Kaifeng: A Millennium of Adaptation and Endurance. Lexington Books. pp. 3–24. ISBN 978-1-498-55027-7.
- Urbach, Noam (2008). "What Prevented the Reconstruction of the Chinese Synagogue? Kaifeng Jews Between Revival and Reconstruction". In Kupfer, Peter (ed.). Youtai - Presence and Perception of Jews and Judaism in China. Peter Lang. pp. 65–138. ISBN 978-3-631-57533-8.
- Wei, Qianzhi (1999). "An investigation of the Date of Jewish Settlement in Kaifeng". In Goldstein, Jonathan (ed.). The Jews of China. A Sourcebook and Research Guide. Vol. 2. M. E. Sharpe. pp. 14–25. ISBN 978-0-765-60105-6.
- Weisskopf, Michael (9 April 1982). "Judaism: Only a Dim Memory to Chinese Descendants". The Washington Post.
- Weisz, Tiberiu (2014). "From East To Farther East: The Jewish Experience in Kaifeng, China". Sephardic Horizons. 4 (3): 23–32.
- Wexler, Paul (2021). Silk Road Linguistics: The Birth of Yiddish and the Multiethnic Jewish Peoples on the Silk Road, 9–13th Centuries, the Indispensable Role of the Arabs, Chinese, Germans, Iranians, Slavs and Turks. Harrassowitz Verlag. ISBN 978-3-447-11573-5.
- Winer, Stuart (29 February 2016). "5 Chinese women immigrate to Israel, plan conversion". The Times of Israel.
- Wong, Fook-Kong; Yasharpour, Dalia (2011). The Haggadah of the Kaifeng Jews of China. BRILL. ISBN 978-9-004-20810-0.
- Wood, Michael (1992). Legacy: A Search for the Origins of Civilization. Network Books. ISBN 978-0-563-36429-0.
- Wylie, Alexander (1864). "Israelites in China". In Summers, James (ed.). Chinese and Japanese Repository. Vol. 1. W. H. Allen & Co. pp. 43–52.
- Xu, Xin (2017) [First published 2000]. "On the Religious Life of the Kaifeng Jewish Community in the 15th–17th Centuries". In Malek, Roman (ed.). From Kaifeng to Shanghai: Jews in China. Routledge. pp. 127–148. ISBN 978-1-351-56628-5.
- Xu, Xin (2003). The Jews of Kaifeng, China: History, Culture, and Religion. KTAV Publishing House. ISBN 978-0-881-25791-5.
- Yin, Gang (2001) [First published 1984]. "The Jews of Kaifeng: Their Origins, Routes, and Assimilation". In Shapiro, Sidney (ed.). Jews in Old China: Studies by Chinese Scholars. Hippocrene Books. pp. 217–238. ISBN 978-0-781-80833-0.
- Yin, Gang (2008). "Between Disintegration and Expansion; A Comparative Retrospection of the Kaifeng Jewish and Muslim Communities". In Kupfer, Peter (ed.). Youtai - Presence and Perception of Jews and Judaism in China. Peter Lang. pp. 185–200. ISBN 978-3-631-57533-8.
- Yu, Peng (Autumn 2017). "Revising the date of Jewish arrival in Kaifeng, China, from the Song Dynasty (960–1279) to the Hung-wu period (1368–98) of the Ming Dynasty". Journal of Jewish Studies. LXVIII (2): 369–386. doi:10.18647/3330/JJS-2017.
- Zhang, Ligang (2008). "The Understanding and Attitude of Chinese Society Towards the Kaifeng Jews". In Kupfer, Peter (ed.). Youtai - Presence and Perception of Jews and Judaism in China. Peter Lang. pp. 139–153. ISBN 978-3-631-57533-8.
- Zhang, Qianhong; Liu, Bailu (2006). "A Study on the Social Condition of Kaifeng Jews from the Remaining Stone Inscriptions". Journal of Henan University. 46 (6): 97–100.
- Zhi-pan (4 November 2002). Buddha Almanac 佛祖統紀 [Fózǔ Tǒngjì] (PDF) (in Chinese). Vol. 44. Chinese Buddhist Electronic Text Association. Archived from the original (CBETA Electronic Version) on 15 December 2021.
- Zhou, Xun (2005). "The "Kaifeng Jew" Hoax: Constructing the "Chinese Jews"". In Kalmar, Ivan Davidson; Penslar, Derek Jonathan (eds.). Orientalism and the Jews. UPNE. pp. 68–80. ISBN 978-1-584-65411-7.
- Zürcher, Eric (2017). "Eight Centuries in the Chinese Diaspora: The Jews of Kaifeng". In Laytner, Anson H.; Paper, Jordan (eds.). The Chinese Jews of Kaifeng: A Millennium of Adaptation and Endurance. Lexington Books. pp. 25–38. ISBN 978-1-498-55027-7.
