= History of Britain (disambiguation) =

History of Britain includes three periods of Great Britain.

History of Britain may also refer to:

- History of the British Isles, including the history of Great Britain, Ireland and its components
  - History of the United Kingdom (1707 to present)
- History of Britain (Milton), a prose work by the English poet John Milton
- A History of the English-Speaking Peoples, 1956–58 four-volume work by Winston Churchill
- A History of Britain (TV series), a documentary series written and presented by Simon Schama
  - A History of Britain (book), the accompanying book
- The History of Great Britain (Hume) history of Britain in six volumes written by David Hume

== See also ==
- History of England (disambiguation)
