= The Story of the Jews =

The Story of the Jews may refer to:

- The Story of the Jews (book), work by British historian Simon Schama
- The Story of the Jews (TV series), based on Schama's book
