= Belonging: The Story of the Jews 1492–1900 =

2017 book by Simon Schama on the cultural history of the Jewish people

- Author: Simon Schama
- Publication date: 2017
- ISBN: 978-1-4481-9066-9

Belonging: The Story of the Jews, 1492–1900, Volume 2 is a 2017 book by Simon Schama on the cultural history of the Jewish people. Belonging is the second volume of Schama's Story of the Jews, the first being The Story of the Jews: Finding the Words, 1000BCE – 1492CE. Belonging was published by Penguin Random House in October 2017.

== Reception ==
Jonathan Freedland, writing in The Guardian called it: 'A magnificent achievement... [a] parade of bustlingly vital characters from across the globe ... all painted in luminous colour... By offering such a throbbing cavalcade of characters, Schama is defying several key assumptions, even stereotypes, about Jewish history and Jews themselves... Above all, while much Jewish history can read like a sorrowful trudge through disaster, plague and pogrom, Schama's book teems with life rather than death.'

Professor David N. Myers wrote in the Financial Times that Schama's book is 'Magisterial ... the product of a world-class historian at the peak of his creative powers ... rich, ornate, intensely evocative and sensory. With astonishing range and extraordinary synthesising powers, Schama captures the drama of Jewish history.'

Roger Cohen wrote in The New York Times: "Belonging: 1492-1900, the second volume of his panoramic study of Jewish life, The Story of the Jews, is in fact an account of serial exile. Jews never belong enough anywhere to avoid vilification as parasites, vultures, usurers and traitors. 'They have clung to us like leeches,' wrote the French polemicist Georges-Marie Mathieu-Dairnvaell in the 1840s, and were no more than 'vampires, scavengers of nature' ... At a time of facile anti-Zionism spilling sometimes into outright anti-Semitism, Schama has made an eloquent and a far-reaching case for why Jews needed a small piece of earth they could call home."

== See also ==
- The Story of the Jews (2013), Volume 1
- The Story of the Jews, Television series
- Jewish history
