= Donald Leslie (academic) =

British-born Australian historian (1922–2020)

Professor Donald Daniel Leslie
- Born: 1 July 1922; Tottenham, London
- Died: 27 March 2020 (aged 97); Sydney, Australia
- Burial place: Woden Cemetery, Canberra
- Education: SOAS University of London, University of Cambridge, University of Paris
- Occupations: scholar, historian, sinologist, translator
- Known for: work on the Chinese Jews of Kaifeng
- Notable work: The Survival of the Chinese Jews (1972), Les juifs de Chine (1980)
- Movement: Jewish, cultural, socialism, atheism
- Spouse: Helga Selz (m. 1958)
- Children: three
- Parents: Alf Leslie (father); Ada Leslie (née Schneiderman) (mother)

Donald Daniel Leslie (1 July 1922 – 27 March 2020) was a British-born Australian historian, especially known for his work on the Chinese Jews of Kaifeng, his books The Survival of the Chinese Jews (1972) and Les juifs de Chine (1980; co-authored with Joseph Dehergne), bringing the community to broader Western attention, through his 'unique expertise' in Hebrew and Chinese. He also wrote on Chinese Islam and on religious minorities in the People's Republic of China (PRC) in general.

Born to Alf and Ada (née Schneiderman) Leslie, a Jewish family in Tottenham, London, England, he spent his formative years at boarding school in Brighton. He subsequently read Chinese at SOAS University of London, earning a Bachelor of Science (BSc) degree. In 1943, he joined the British Army and served in Belgium and Holland towards the end of World War II. After the war, he went to Kure, near Hiroshima, with the Intelligence Corps as an interpreter and translator. Upon leaving the British Army, he returned to England. This was followed by five years at the University of Cambridge, earning a Diploma in Chinese in 1951, and a Master of Letters (M.Litt.) in Chinese Studies in 1954. Emigrating to Israel in 1954, he volunteered to join the newly-formed Israel Defence Force (IDF). It was in Israel where he would later reacquaint himself with his future wife, Helga Selz, a former Kindertransport and the sole survivor of her family who previously lived in London, having first met whilst she was working the Israeli travel agency Shoham in London. Whilst in Israel, he held a research fellowship at the Hebrew University in Jerusalem from 1958 to 1960. Having then moved to Paris in France, a Doctor of Philosophy (PhD) (très honorable) was awarded at the University of Paris (1962) under the supervision of Jacques Gernet. Moving to Australia in 1963 to take up a Research Fellow at the Australian National University (ANU) until 1970, which also included a year at Kyoto University, he subsequently accepted a permanent position at the ANU. From 1970 to 1972, he worked as associate professor at Tel Aviv University, before returning to Australia in 1972 to teach history at the Canberra College of Advanced Education. From 1972 to 1974, returned to the ANU part-time to teach classical Chinese. Whilst at the ANU, he was regularly appointed as an external examiner for PhD students in Chinese studies. Upon his retirement in 1988, he retained an affiliation with ANU, continuing his research as Visiting Fellow for a further thirteen years.

He died on 27 March 2020 (aged 97) in Sydney, Australia, and was buried on 3 April 2020 next to his late wife Helga in Woden Cemetery, Canberra, after a Covid-restricted Jewish burial service conducted by Rabbi Elhanan Miller, with just eight close family mourners in attendance.

== See also ==
- Kaifeng Jews

== Published works ==
- Leslie, Donald Daniel (1953). Early Chinese Ideas on Heredity. P. Lang.
- Leslie, Donald Daniel (1966). Authors Catalogues of Western Sinologists. Department of Far Eastern History, Research School of Pacific Studies, Australian National University Press.
- Leslie, Donald Daniel (1967). The Chinese-Hebrew Memorial Book of the Jewish Community of K'aifeng, Part 3. E.J. Brill.
- Leslie, Donald Daniel; Davidson, Jeremy H.C.S. (1967). Catalogue of Chinese Local Gazetteers. Department of Far Eastern history, Research School of Pacific Studies, Australian National University.
- Leslie, Donald Daniel (1972). The Survival of the Chinese Jews: The Jewish Community of Kaifeng. Leiden, Netherlands: E.J. Brill. ISBN 9789004034136.
- Leslie, Donald Daniel; Dehergne, Joseph (1980). Juifs de Chine: à travers la correspondance inédite des jésuites du dix-huitième siècle. Rome, Italy: Institutum Historicum. ISBN 9788870413410.
- Leslie, Donald Daniel (1981). Islamic Literature in Chinese, Late Ming and Early Ch'ing: Books, Authors, and Associates. Canberra College of Advanced Education. ISBN 9780858891890.
- Leslie, Donald Daniel (1984). The Chinese-Hebrew Memorial Book of the Jewish Community of K'aifeng. Canberra, Australia: Canberra College of Advanced Education. ISBN 9780858892583.
- Leslie, Donald Daniel (1986). Islam in Traditional China: A Short History to 1800. Canberra College of Advanced Education. ISBN 9780858892736.
- Leslie, Donald Daniel (1988). Jews and Judaism in Traditional China: A Comprehensive Bibliography. Monumenta Serica Institute. ISBN 9783805004183.
- Leslie, Donald Daniel (1998). Jews and Judaism in Traditional China: A Comprehensive Bibliography. Monumenta Serica Monograph Series. Vol. XLIV. Nettetal, Germany: Steyler Verlag. ISBN 3-8050-0418-4. ISSN 0179-261X. OCLC 883554407.
- Leslie, Donald Daniel (2003). Not a Bowl of Chicken Soup: Memoirs of a Jewish Confucian. Donald Daniel Leslie. ISBN 9780975044209.
- Leslie, Donald Daniel; Daye, Yang; Yousef, Ahmed (2006). Islam in Traditional China: A Bibliographical Guide. Monumenta Serica Institute. ISBN 9783805005333.
