= Peony (novel) =

1948 novel by Pearl S. Buck

- First edition cover
- Author: Pearl S. Buck
- Language: English
- Genre: Historical novel
- Publisher: The John Day Company
- Publication date: 1948
- Publication place: United States
- Media type: Print (Hardback & Paperback)

Peony, published in the UK as The Bondmaid, is a novel by Pearl S. Buck first published in 1948. It is a story of China's Kaifeng Jews.

== Plot ==
Peony is set in the 1850s in the city of Kaifeng, in the province of Henan, which was historically a center for Chinese Jews. The novel follows Peony, a Chinese bondmaid of the prominent Jewish family of Ezra ben Israel's, and shows through her eyes how the Jewish community was regarded in Kaifeng at a time when most of the Jews had come to think of themselves as Chinese. The novel contains a hidden love and shows the importance of duty, along with the challenges of life. This novel follows the guidelines of Buck's work: it is set in China, and it involves religion and an interracial couple (David and Kueilan).

== Preface ==
A prefatory note preceding the title page, which tells the reader of the assimilation about the Jews of Kaifeng, reads: "Today even the memory of their origin is gone. They are Chinese."
