= The American Future: A History =

2008 British television documentary series)

- DVD cover
- Written by: Simon Schama
- Directed by: Sam Hobkinson; Ricardo Pollack
- Presented by: Simon Schama
- Country of origin: United Kingdom
- No. of episodes: 4

Production
- Running time: 60 minutes

Original release
- Network: BBC Two
- Release: 10 October – 31 October 2008

The American Future: A History is a four-part documentary series written and presented by Simon Schama which aired on BBC Two in the UK during October 2008, in the run up to the 2008 US presidential election. The first episode was broadcast on BBC Two at 9:00pm on 10 October 2008, and it was shown over four consecutive Fridays.

The series saw Schama travelling through the United States as he investigated the conflicts from its past in order to understand the country's contemporary political situation. Schama presents and discusses both presidential candidates, Democrat Barack Obama and Republican John McCain, from a historical point of view, emphasizing strongly the former. The documentary takes the viewer on an epic journey through the history of the modern United States, but it also reveals why Schama personally believed Barack Obama would be the ideal choice as the next president of the United States.

== Episodes ==
| No. | Title | Original release date |
|---|---|---|
| 1 | "American Plenty" | 10 October 2008 |
A look at America's waning belief in the infinite possibilities of its land and resources.
| 2 | "American War" | 17 October 2008 |
A look at how different the US attitude to war is from what outsiders assume it to be.
| 3 | "American Fervour" | 24 October 2008 |
How faith has shaped American political life.
| 4 | "What is an American?" | 31 October 2008 |
The bitter conflict over immigration in America.

== International broadcast ==
In the United States and Australia, this programme aired with the re-worked title, The American Future: A History By Simon Schama:

- US viewers saw all four episodes combined into two parts on BBC America at 8pm ET/PT from 19 January until 20 January 2009.
- Australian viewers saw these episodes in their original four parts on ABC1 each Thursday at 9:30pm from 27 May until 17 June 2010.
