= Roman Malek =

Polish-born German professor and sinologist (1951–2019)

- Born: 3 October 1951; Bytów, Polish People's Republic
- Died: 29 November 2019 (aged 68); Grudziądz, Poland
- Education: University of Bonn
- Occupations: Professor; Sinologist

Roman Malek (3 October 1951 – 29 November 2019) was a Polish-born German professor and sinologist.

== Biography ==
Born in Bytów, Polish People's Republic, Malek entered the Society of the Divine Word (SVD) in 1969. He studied philosophy, theology, and comparative religions, completing a doctorate in Sinology (1984) and a Habilitationsschrift on the Chinese theologian Wu Leichuan (2003), both at the University of Bonn. Malek was a professor of philosophy and religious sciences at SVD Saint Augustin University of Philosophy and Theology and a sinology professor at the University of Bonn.

Malek was a prolific scholar, producing more than 970 academic pieces. Malek was also an experienced editor, overseeing the publication of 20 volumes of the journal Monumenta Serica and editing three book series which produced 75 volumes.

In 2018, he moved back to his native Poland and died due to illness on 29 November 2019.

== Works ==
- Malek, Roman (1996). Das Tao des Himmels. Die religiöse Tradition Chinas (in German). Herder GmbH & Co, KG, Verlag. ISBN 3451238446.
- Malek, Roman, ed. (2002–2019). The Chinese Face of Jesus Christ. Vol. 1-4b. Sankt Augustin, Germany: Monumenta Serica.
- Malek, Roman (2004). Verschmelzung der Horizonte: Mozi und Jesus (in German). Brill. ISBN 978-90-47-41351-6.

A bibliography of his 970 works can be found in the two-volume festschrift produced in his honor, Rooted in Hope (2017).
