= Virginia Papaioannou =

Developmental biologist

- Born: Virginia Vann

Virginia E. Papaioannou (born 1946) is a developmental biologist, recognized for her work on mammalian genetics. She is a Special Lecturer and Professor Emerita in the Department of Genetics and Development at Columbia University Irving Medical Center.

== Education and career ==
Papaioannou grew up in Ukiah, California. She earned her B.S. in Biological Sciences from the University of California, Davis in 1968 and her Ph.D. in Genetics from Cambridge University in 1972.

== Research ==
Throughout her career, she has focused on the genetic control of early mammalian development, from the first cleavage of the fertilized zygote through implantation, gastrulation, and early organogenesis. Papaioannou has extensively studied the T-box gene family, which plays a crucial role in mesoderm formation and organogenesis. Her research led to significant insights into developmental birth defects, producing mouse models for human syndromes such as DiGeorge syndrome (TBX1) and ulnar mammary syndrome (TBX3). Her work has been important for understanding how these genes control cell fate and tissue specification during early development.

== Personal life ==
She is married to Sir Simon Schama, an English historian and television presenter; they have two children. In 2014, Schama was living in Briarcliff Manor, New York.

== Selected publications ==
- Papaioannou, V. E.; Mcburney, M. W.; Gardner, R. L.; Evans, M. J. (1975). "Fate of teratocarcinoma cells injected into early mouse embryos". Nature. 258 (5530): 70–73. Bibcode:1975Natur.258...70P. doi:10.1038/258070a0. ISSN 0028-0836. PMID 1186881.
- Mombaerts, Peter; Iacomini, John; Johnson, Randall S.; Herrup, Karl; Tonegawa, Susumu; Papaioannou, Virginia E. (1992-03-06). "RAG-1-deficient mice have no mature B and T lymphocytes". Cell. 68 (5): 869–877. doi:10.1016/0092-8674(92)90030-G. ISSN 0092-8674. PMID 1547488.
- Papaioannou, Virginia E.; Silver, Lee M. (1998). "The T-box gene family". BioEssays. 20 (1): 9–19. doi:10.1002/(SICI)1521-1878(199801)20:1<9::AID-BIES4>3.0.CO;2-Q. ISSN 1521-1878. PMID 9504043.
- Jerome, Loydie A.; Papaioannou, Virginia E. (2001). "DiGeorge syndrome phenotype in mice mutant for the T-box gene, Tbx1". Nature Genetics. 27 (3): 286–291. doi:10.1038/85845. ISSN 1061-4036. PMID 11242110.

== Honors and awards ==
Her contributions have been recognized with several honors, including the NIH MERIT award and the Dean's Distinguished Lecture in the Basic Sciences at Columbia University.
