= The History of England from the Accession of James the Second =

Five-volume piece of literature by Lord Macaulay

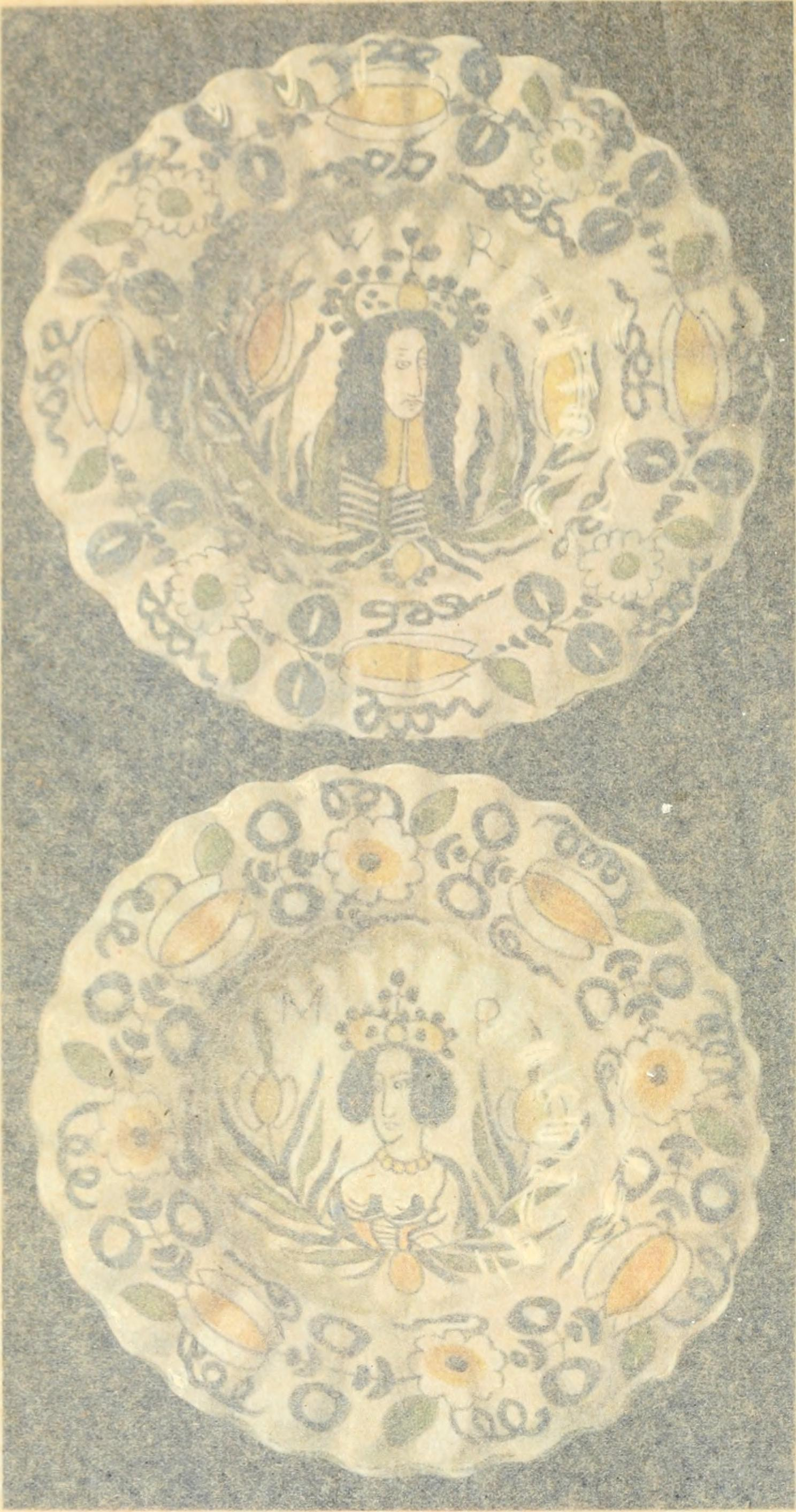
Illustration from the 1914 edition

The History of England from the Accession of James the Second (1848) is the full title of the five-volume work by Lord Macaulay (1800–1859) more generally known as The History of England. It covers the 17-year period from 1685 to 1702, encompassing the reign of James II, the Glorious Revolution, the coregency of William III and Mary II, and up to William III's death.

Macaulay's approach to writing the History was innovative for his period. He consciously fused the picturesque, dramatic style of classical historians such as Thucydides and Tacitus with the learned and factual approach of his 18th-century precursors such as Hume, following the plan laid out in his own 1828 "Essay on History".

== Reputation ==
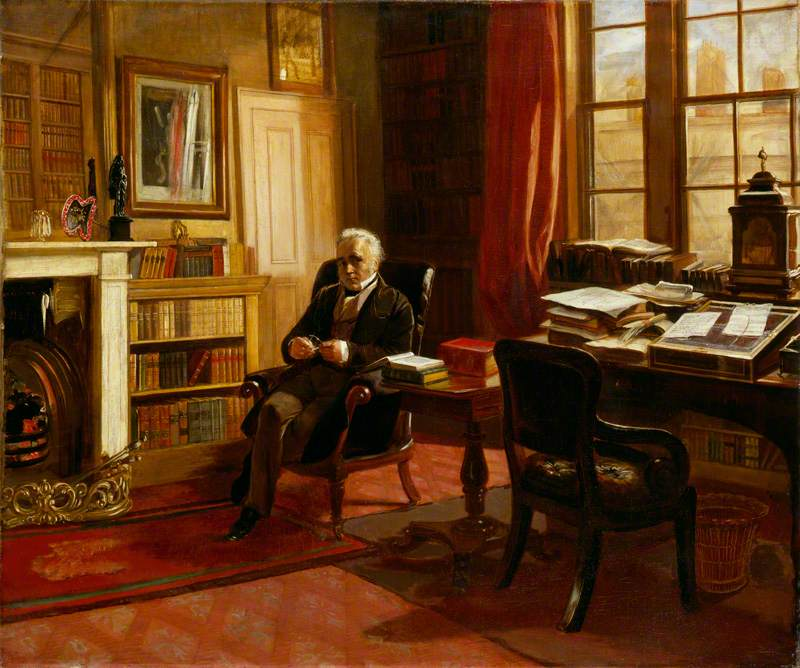
Portrait of Thomas Babington Macaulay by Edward Matthew Ward, 1853

The History is famous for its prose and for its confident, sometimes dogmatic, emphasis on a progressive model of British history. According to this view, England threw off superstition, autocracy and confusion to create a balanced constitution and a forward-looking culture combined with freedom of belief and expression. This model of human progress has been called the Whig interpretation of history.

Macaulay's approach has been criticised by later historians for its one-sidedness and its complacency. Karl Marx referred to him as a "systematic falsifier of history". His tendency to see history as a drama led him to treat figures whose views he opposed as if they were villains, while his approved characters were presented as heroes. Macaulay goes to considerable length, for example, to absolve his hero King William III of any responsibility for the Glencoe massacre (1692).

== See also ==
- History of England (disambiguation)
