= A History of Britain (book series) =

Trilogy of books by Simon Schama

- Cover of the first volume
- Author: Simon Schama
- Language: English
- Subject: British history
- Publisher: Bodley Head
- Publication date: 2000 (first volume); 2001 (second volume); 2002 (third volume)
- Publication place: United Kingdom
- Media type: Print

A History of Britain is a series of three books by Simon Schama, written to accompany his BBC television series A History of Britain.

The volumes are:

- A History of Britain I: At the Edge of the World? 3000 BC–AD 1603 (BBC, 2000, ISBN 0-563-48714-3)
- A History of Britain II: The British Wars 1603–1776 (BBC, 2001, ISBN 0-563-48718-6)
- A History of Britain III: The Fate of Empire 1776–2000 (BBC, 2002, ISBN 0-563-48719-4)
