= History of England (disambiguation) =

The history of England is the study of the human past in one of Europe's oldest and most influential national territories.

History of England may also refer to:

- The History of England (Echard), 1707 book by Laurence Echard
- The History of England (Ralph), 1744–1746 book by John Ralph
- The History of England (Hume), 1754 book by David Hume
- The History of England (Austen), 1791 parody by Jane Austen
- A complete history of England, from the descent of Julius Caesar, to the Treaty of Aix la Chapelle, 1748, a ten-volume history by Tobias Smollett
- The History of England from the Accession of James the Second, 1848 multi-volume work by Lord Macaulay
- A Child's History of England, 1851-54 three book series by Charles Dickens, intended for adults despite the name
- History of England from the Fall of Wolsey to the Defeat of the Spanish Armada, 1893 multi-volume work by James Anthony Froude
- History of England (Trevelyn book), 1926 book by G. M. Trevelyan
  - A Shortened History of England (1942), abridged version of above
- A History of England (1997–2002), a series of reprints of twelve classic, magisterial volumes of different periods of English history

== See also ==
- History of Britain (disambiguation)
