= Aaron Demsky =

Israeli Bible researcher

Aaron Demsky (Hebrew: אהרן דמסקי) is professor of biblical history at Bar-Ilan University. He is an epigrapher noted for his work on onomastics.

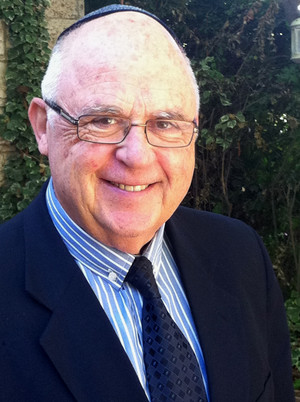
Aaron demsky

Demsky is the winner of the 2014 Bialik Prize for his book, Literacy in Ancient Israel.

== Books ==
- Pleasant are Their Names: Jewish Names in the Sephardi Diaspora, University of Maryland Press, 2010 ISBN 9781934309247
- These are the names : studies in Jewish onomastics, with Joseph A. Reif, Joseph Tabory. Bar-Ilan University Press, 1997. ISBN 9652261920 (v. 1), 9652262269 (v. 2)
- Yediʻat sefer be-Yiśraʼel ba-ʻet ha-ʻatiḳah, Mosad Byaliḳ, 2012. ISBN 9789655360462
