= Simon Schama =

English historian (born 1945)

Professor Sir Simon Schama CBE FBA FRHistS FRSL
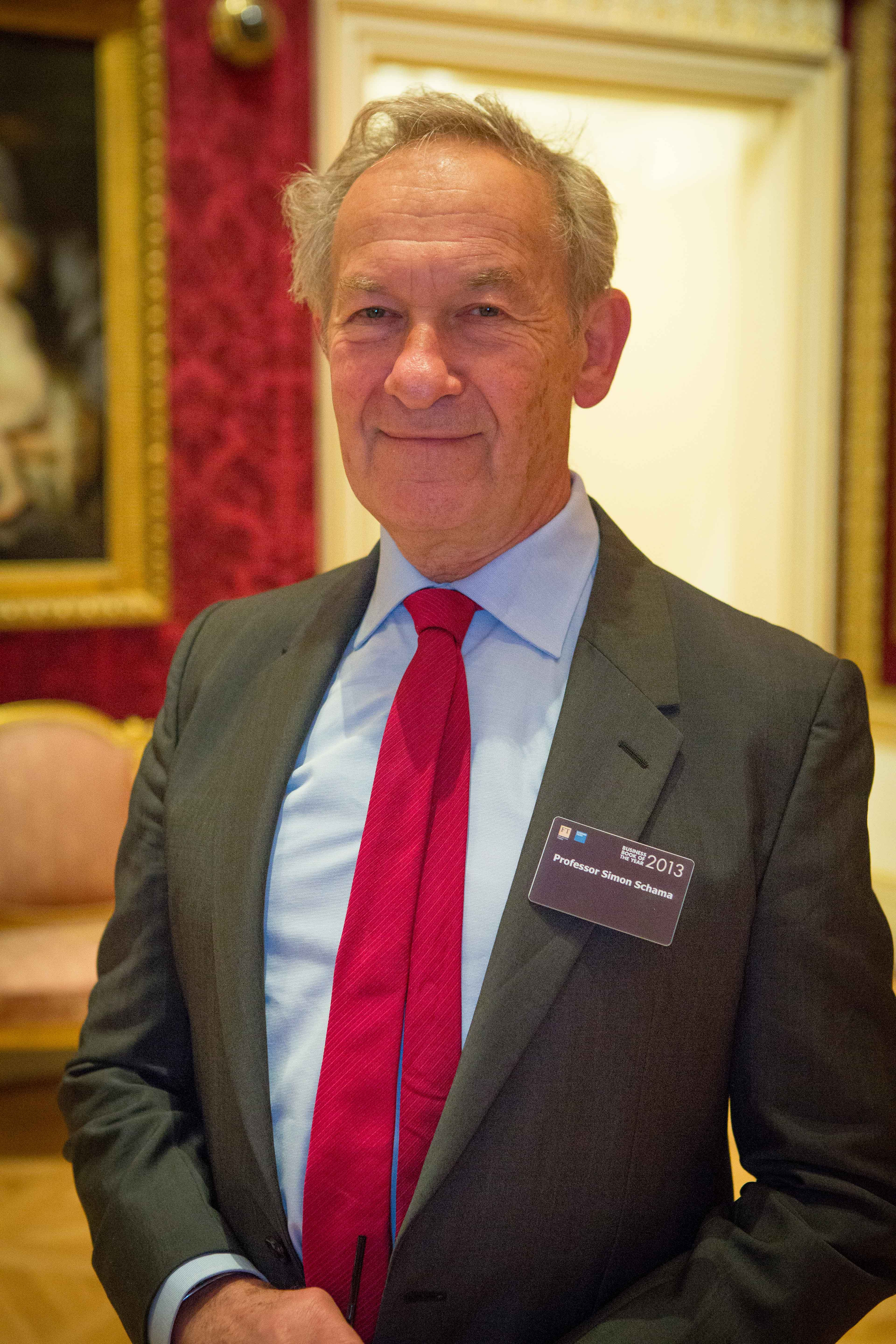
- At the Financial Times and Goldman Sachs Business Book of the Year Award presentation in 2013
- Born: Simon Michael Schama; 13 February 1945 (age 81); Marylebone, London, England
- Awards: Wolfson History Prize; Leo Gershoy Award; Fellow of the Royal Society of Literature

Academic background
- Education: Haberdashers' Aske's Boys' School
- Alma mater: Christ's College, Cambridge

Academic work
- Discipline: History and art history
- Sub-discipline: British history; European history; Jewish history; Eighteenth century; French Revolution; Patriottentijd; Dutch Golden Age
- Institutions: Christ's College, Cambridge; Brasenose College, Oxford; School for Advanced Studies in the Social Sciences, Paris; Harvard University; Columbia University
- Simon Schama's voice Recorded December 2013 from the BBC Radio 4 programme Start the Week

Sir Simon Michael Schama CBE FBA FRHistS FRSL (/ˈʃɑːmə/ SHAH-mə; born 13 February 1945) is an English historian and television presenter. He specialises in art history, Dutch history, Jewish history, and French history. As of January 2026 he is a professor of history and art history at Columbia University.

Schama first came to public attention with his history of the French Revolution titled Citizens, published in 1989. He is also known for writing and hosting the 15-part BBC television documentary series A History of Britain (2000–2002), as well as other documentary series such as The American Future: A History (2008) and The Story of the Jews (2013).

Schama was knighted in the 2018 Queen's Birthday Honours List.

== Early life and education ==
Simon Michael Schama was born on 13 February 1945 in Marylebone, London. His mother, Gertie (née Steinberg), was from an Ashkenazi Lithuanian Jewish family (from Kaunas, present-day Lithuania), and his father, Arthur Schama, was of Sephardi Jewish background (from Smyrna, present-day İzmir in Turkey), later moving through Moldova and Romania.

Schama has recalled attending synagogue with his family every Shabbat during his childhood and not travelling by car or bus on the day.

In the mid-1940s, the family moved to Southend-on-Sea in Essex, before moving back to London. In 1956, Schama won a scholarship to the private Haberdashers' Aske's Boys' School in Cricklewood (from 1961 Elstree, Hertfordshire). He then studied history at Christ's College, Cambridge, where he was taught by John H. Plumb. He graduated from the University of Cambridge with a Starred First in 1966.

== Career ==
From 1966 to 1976, Schama was a fellow and director of studies in history at Christ's College, Cambridge. He then moved to Oxford University, where he was elected a fellow of Brasenose College, Oxford, in 1976, specialising in the French Revolution. He also worked at the School for Advanced Studies in the Social Sciences (EHESS) in Paris.

At this time, Schama wrote his first book, Patriots and Liberators, which won the Wolfson History Prize. The book was originally intended as a study of the French Revolution, but as published in 1977, it focused on the effect of the Patriottentijd revolution of the 1780s in the Netherlands, and its aftermath.

Schama's second book, Two Rothschilds and the Land of Israel (1978), is a study of the Zionist aims of Edmond and James Rothschild.

=== In the United States ===
In 1980, Schama took up a chair at Harvard University as Mellon Professor of History. His next book, The Embarrassment of Riches (1987), again focused on Dutch history. Schama interpreted the ambivalences that informed the Dutch Golden Age of the 17th century, held in balance between the conflicting imperatives, to live richly and with power, or to live a godly life. The iconographic evidence that Schama draws upon, in 317 illustrations, of emblems and propaganda that defined Dutch character, prefigured his expansion in the 1990s as a commentator on art and visual culture.

External videos
- Booknotes interview with Schama, July 14, 1989, C-SPAN

Citizens (1989), written at speed to a publisher's commission, saw the publication of his long-awaited study of the French Revolution, and won the 1990 NCR Book Award. Its view that the violence of the Terror was inherent from the start of the Revolution has received serious negative criticism.

Schama appeared as an on-screen expert in Michael Wood's 1989 PBS series Art of the Western World ("Realms of Light: The Baroque") as a presenting art historian, commenting on paintings by Diego Velázquez, Rembrandt, and Johannes Vermeer.

In 1991, he published Dead Certainties (Unwarranted Speculations), a relatively slender work of unusual structure and point-of-view in that it looked at two widely reported deaths a hundred years apart, that of British Army General James Wolfe in 1759 – and the famous 1770 painting depicting the event by Benjamin West – and that of George Parkman, murdered uncle of the better known 19th-century American historian Francis Parkman.

Schama mooted some possible (invented) connections between the two cases, exploring the historian's inability "ever to reconstruct a dead world in its completeness however thorough or revealing the documentation", and speculatively bridging "the teasing gap separating a lived event and its subsequent narration." Not all readers absorbed the nuance of the title: it received a very mixed critical and academic reception. Traditional historians in particular denounced Schama's integration of fact and conjecture to produce a seamless narrative, but later assessments took a more relaxed view of the experiment. It was an approach soon taken up by such historical writers as Peter Ackroyd, David Taylor, and Richard Holmes.

Schama's next book, Landscape and Memory (1995), focused on the relationship between physical environment and folk memory, separating the components of landscape as wood, water and rock, enmeshed in the cultural consciousness of collective "memory" embodied in myths, which Schama finds to be expressed outwardly in ceremony and text. More personal and idiosyncratic than Dead Certainties, this book was more traditionally structured and better-defined in its approach. Despite mixed reviews, the book was a commercial success and won numerous prizes.

Plaudits came from the art world rather than from traditional academia. Schama became art critic for The New Yorker in 1995. He held the position for three years, dovetailing his regular column with professorial duties at Columbia University; a selection of his essays on art for the magazine, chosen by Schama himself, was published in 2005 under the title Hang Ups. During this time, Schama also produced a lavishly illustrated Rembrandt's Eyes, another critical and commercial success. Despite the book's title, it contrasts the biographies of Rembrandt van Rijn and Peter Paul Rubens.

As of January 2026 Schama is University Professor of Art History and History at Columbia University in New York.

=== BBC ===
External videos
- Presentation by Schama on A History of Britain: 3500 B.C. – 1603 A.D., December 5, 2000, C-SPAN

Schama returned to the UK in 2000, having been commissioned by the BBC to produce a series of television documentary programmes on British history as part of their Millennium celebrations, under the title A History of Britain, 15-part BBC television documentary series broadcast from 2000 to 2002. Schama wrote and presented the episodes himself, in a friendly and often jocular style with his highly characteristic delivery, and was rewarded with excellent reviews and unexpectedly high ratings. Three series were made, totalling 15 episodes, covering the complete span of British history up until 1965; it went on to become one of the BBC's best-selling documentary series on DVD. Schama also wrote a trilogy of tie-in books for the show, which took the story up to the year 2000; there is some debate as to whether the books are the tie-in product for the TV series, or the other way around. The series also had some popularity in the United States when it was first shown on the History Channel. Alastair Moffat, who in 2003 presented another series on the history of Britain, felt Schama's series did not give sufficient coverage to the pre-Anglo-Saxon history of Insular Celtic civilisation.

External videos
- After Words interview with Schama on Rough Crossings, July 22, 2006, C-SPAN
- Presentation by Schama on Rough Crossings, June 26, 2006, C-SPAN

In 2001, Schama received a CBE. In 2003, he signed a new contract with the BBC and HarperCollins to produce three new books and two accompanying TV series. Worth £3 million (around US$5.3m), it represents the biggest advance deal ever for a TV historian. The first result of the deal was a book and TV show entitled Rough Crossings: Britain, the Slaves and the American Revolution, dealing in particular with the proclamation issued during the Revolutionary War by Lord Dunmore offering slaves from rebel plantations freedom in return for service to the crown.

In 2006, the BBC broadcast a new TV series, Simon Schama's Power of Art, which, with an accompanying book, was presented and written by Schama. It marks a return to art history for him, treating eight artists through eight key works: Caravaggio's David with the Head of Goliath, Bernini's Ecstasy of Saint Teresa, Rembrandt's The Conspiracy of Claudius Civilis, Jacques-Louis David's The Death of Marat, J. M. W. Turner's The Slave Ship, Vincent van Gogh's Wheatfield with Crows, Picasso's Guernica and Mark Rothko's Seagram murals. It was also shown on PBS in the United States.

External videos
- Presentation by Schama on The American Future: A History, May 19, 2009, C-SPAN
- Presentation by Schama on The American Future: A History, September 26, 2009, C-SPAN

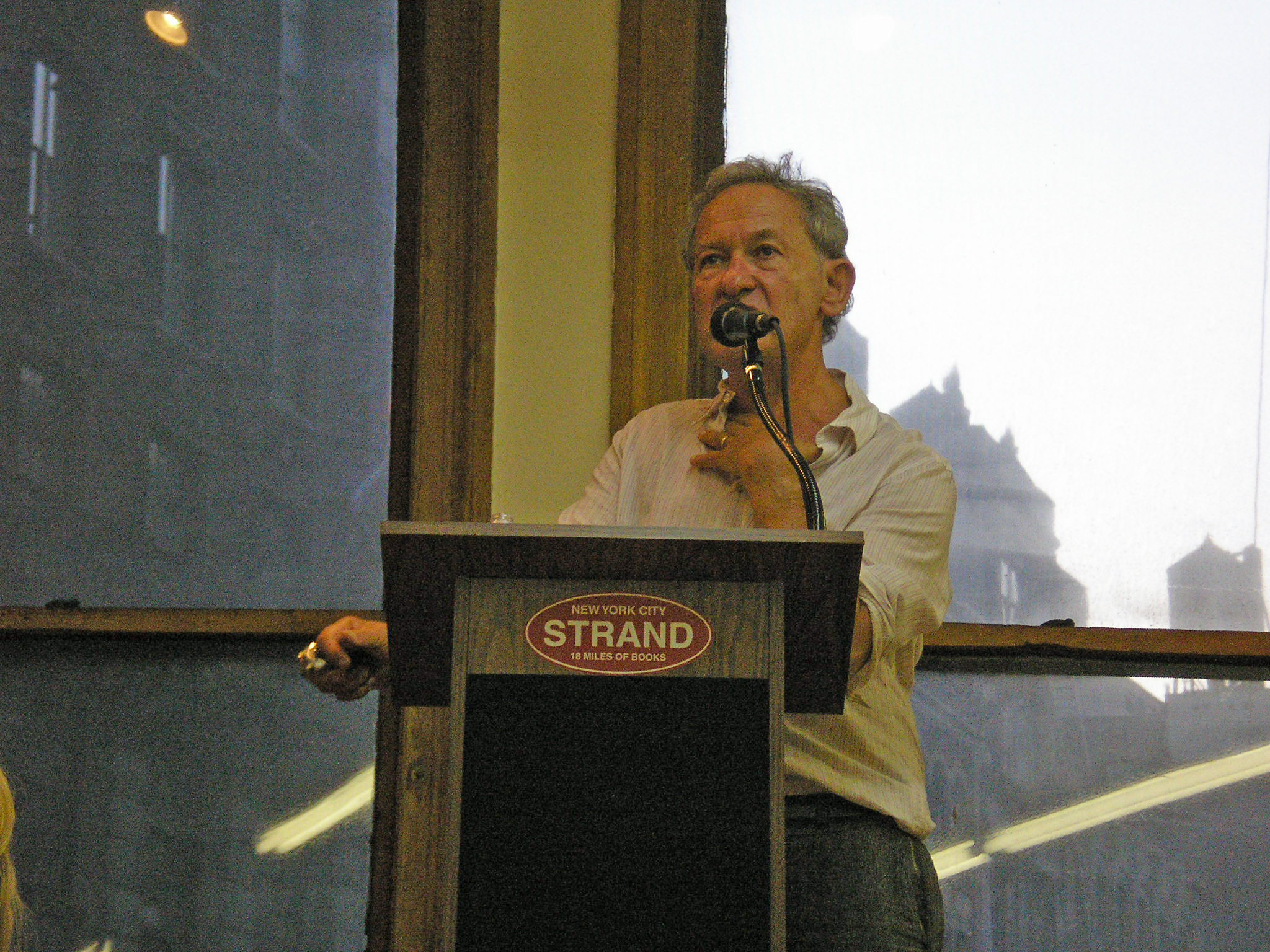
Schama at New York City's Strand Bookstore in 2006.

In October 2008, on the eve of the presidential election won by Barack Obama, the BBC broadcast a four-part television series called The American Future: A History presented and written by Schama. In March 2009, Schama presented a BBC Radio 4 show entitled Baseball and Me, both exploring the history of the game and describing his own personal support of the Boston Red Sox.

In 2010, Schama presented a series of ten talks for the BBC Radio 4 series A Point of View.

External videos
- Presentation by Schama on The Story of the Jews, March 27, 2014, C-SPAN

In 2011, the BBC commissioned Simon Schama to write and present a five-part series called A History of the Jews for BBC Two, for transmission in 2012, The title became The Story of the Jews and broadcast was delayed until September 2013. Writing in The Observer, Andrew Anthony called the series "an astonishing achievement, a TV landmark."

In 2018, Simon Schama wrote and presented five of the nine episodes of Civilisations, a reboot of the 1969 series by Kenneth Clark.

== Personal life ==
Schama is Jewish. He is married to Virginia Papaioannou, a geneticist from California; they have two children. In 2014, Schama was living in Briarcliff Manor, New York.

He is a Tottenham Hotspur supporter.

=== Politics ===
In 2010, Schama was a financial donor to Oona King's unsuccessful campaign to become Mayor of London.

In August 2014, Schama was one of 200 public figures who were signatories to a letter to The Guardian expressing their hope that Scotland would vote to remain part of the United Kingdom in September's referendum on that issue.

On April 1, 2016, Schama participated in a Munk Debate concerning what was being called a global refugee crisis at the time, arguing alongside Louise Arbour in favour of the resolution that Western nations have a moral imperative to accept a large influx of refugees. Beginning the evening with 77 percent of the audience supporting their side, Arbour and Schama lost the debate to opponents Mark Steyn and Nigel Farage, who swung 22 percent of the audience vote against the resolution by the end of the event.

In November 2017, Schama joined Simon Sebag Montefiore and Howard Jacobson in writing a letter to The Times about their concern over antisemitism in the Labour Party under Jeremy Corbyn's leadership, with particular reference to a growth in anti-Zionism and its purported "antisemitic characteristics". Schama made a further criticism of the party in July 2019, when he joined other leading Jewish figures in saying, in a letter to The Guardian, that the crisis was "a taint of international and historic shame" and that trust in the party was "fractured beyond repair".

==== Israel ====
Schama was critical of British art critic John Berger's support for the Palestinian call for an academic boycott of Israel. Writing in The Guardian in a 2006 article co-authored with Anthony Julius, Schama compared the open letter written by Berger and signed by 92 other leading artists to Nazi Germany, saying: "This is not the first boycott call directed at Jews. On 1 April 1933, only weeks after he came to power, Hitler ordered a boycott of Jewish shops, banks, offices and department stores."

In 2006 on the BBC, Schama debated with Vivienne Westwood the morality of Israel's actions in the Israel-Lebanon War. He described Israel's bombing of Lebanese city centres as unhelpful to Israel's attempt to "get rid of" Hezbollah. He said: "Of course the spectacle and suffering makes us grieve. Who wouldn't grieve? But it's not enough to do that. We've got to understand. You've even got to understand Israel's point of view."

In 2026 he decried the toxic spread of antisemitism in popular culture following the 7th October 2023 attack. "The truth is not dead but it is on life-support," he declared, stressing that "the Nazis were genocidal. Israel is not."

==== United States ====
Schama was a supporter of President Barack Obama and a critic of George W. Bush. He appeared on the BBC's coverage of the 2008 US presidential election, clashing with John Bolton.

== Reception and appraisal ==
Niall Ferguson praised Schama, "Amongst [historians] currently writing, Simon Schama stands out as the Dickens of modern historiography: bewilderingly erudite and prolific, passionate in his enthusiasms and armed with the complete contents of the thesaurus."

== Prizes and other honours ==
- 1977: Wolfson History Prize, for Patriots and Liberators
- 1977: Leo Gershoy Award, for Patriots and Liberators
- 1987: New York Times Best Books of the Year, for The Embarrassment of Riches
- 1989: New York Times Best Books of the Year, for Citizens: A Chronicle of the French Revolution
- 1989: Yorkshire Post Book Award, for Citizens: A Chronicle of the French Revolution
- 1990: NCR Book Award, for Citizens: A Chronicle of the French Revolution
- 1992: American Academy of Arts and Letters Award for Literature
- 1995: Elected to Honorary Fellowship, Christ's College, Cambridge
- 1996: Lionel Trilling Book Award, for Landscape and Memory
- 1996: National Magazine Awards, for critical essays in The New Yorker
- 1996: WH Smith Literary Award, for Landscape and Memory
- 2001: St. Louis Literary Award from the Saint Louis University Library Associates
- 2001: Broadcasting Press Guild Writer's Award, for A History of Britain
- 2001: Nominated for BAFTA Huw Wheldon Award for Specialised Programme or Series (Arts, History, Religion and Science), for A History of Britain
- 2002: Nominated for BAFTA Richard Dimbleby Award for the Best Presenter (Factual, Features and News), for A History of Britain
- 2003: Nominated for Outstanding Individual Achievement in a Craft: Writing Emmy Award for The Two Winstons, an episode of A History of Britain
- 2006: National Book Critics Circle Award for Nonfiction winner, for Rough Crossings
- 2006: PEN Hessell-Tiltman Prize shortlist, for Rough Crossings
- 2007: International Emmy Award, for Bernini, an episode of Simon Schama's Power of Art
- 2007: Nominated for BAFTA Huw Wheldon Award for Specialised Factual Programme or Series, for Simon Schama's Power of Art
- 2008: The Daily Telegraph's 110 Best Books: The Perfect Library, for Citizens: A Chronicle of the French Revolution
- 2011: Kenyon Review Award for Literary Achievement
- 2015: Corresponding Fellow of the British Academy
- 2015: Feltrinelli Prize for History
- 2017: Fellow of the Royal Society of Literature
- 2018: Knight Bachelor, for services to history
- 2026: BAFTA Specialist Factual award for Simon Schama: The Road to Auschwitz
- 2026: Annual News & Documentary Emmy Award for Outstanding Historical Documentary Simon Schama: The Holocaust, 80 Years On

== Honours ==
=== Commonwealth honours ===
Commonwealth honours

Country	Date	Appointment	Post-nominal letters
United Kingdom	2001 – Present	Commander of the Order of the British Empire	CBE
United Kingdom	2018 – Present	Knight Bachelor	Kt

=== Scholastic ===
University degrees

Location	Date	School	Degree
England	1966	Christ's College, Cambridge	Starred First Bachelor of Arts (BA) in History

Chancellor, visitor, governor, rector and fellowships

Location	Date	School	Position
England	1995 – Present	Christ's College, Cambridge	Honorary Fellow
England	12 December 2012–Present	Queen Mary University of London	Honorary Fellow
England	2015 – 2016	Trinity College, Oxford	Visiting professor of Historiography
England		Brasenose College, Oxford	Fellow

Honorary degrees

Location	Date	School	Degree	Gave Commencement Address
New York	20 May 1990	Adelphi University	Doctor of Humane Letters (DHL)	
England	5 November 1999	University of Greenwich	Doctor of Letters (D.Litt.)	
Newfoundland and Labrador	October 2002	Memorial University of Newfoundland	Doctor of Letters (D.Litt.)	
New York	24 May 2003	Bard College	Doctorate	
England	21 July 2006	University of Essex	Doctor of the University (D.Univ)	
England	2007	Anglia Ruskin University	Doctor of the University (D.Univ)	
Pennsylvania	2009	Gettysburg College	Doctorate	
England	2010	Royal College of Art	Doctorate	
England	19 May 2011	Royal Holloway, University of London	Doctor of Literature (D.Litt.)	
Israel	29 March 2015	Weizmann Institute of Science	Doctor of Philosophy (PhD)	Yes

=== Memberships and Fellowships ===
Location	Date	Organisation	Position
United Kingdom	2015 – Present	British Academy	Fellow (FBA)
United Kingdom	2017 – Present	Royal Society of Literature	Fellow (FRSL)

== Awards ==
Location	Date	Institution	Award
District of Columbia	1977	The American Historical Association	The Leo Gershoy Award: For his Book "Patriots and Liberators: Revolution in the Netherlands 1780–1813"
England	1977	The Wolfson Foundation	The Wolfson History Prize: For his Book "Patriots and Liberators: Revolution in the Netherlands 1780–1813"
New York	1992	The American Academy of Arts and Letters	Award in Literature
England	2002	The Historical Association	The Medlicott Medal
Italy	2015	The Accademia dei Lincei	The Feltrinelli Prize for History

== Bibliography ==
Books

- Patriots and Liberators: Revolution in the Netherlands 1780–1813 (1977)
- Two Rothschilds and the Land of Israel (1978)
- The Embarrassment of Riches: An Interpretation of Dutch Culture in the Golden Age (1987)
- Citizens: A Chronicle of the French Revolution (1989)
- Dead Certainties: Unwarranted Speculations (1991, ISBN 9780394222202)
- Landscape and Memory (1995, ISBN 9780679402558)
- Rembrandt's Eyes (1999, ISBN 9780676593921)
- A History of Britain: At the Edge of the World 3000 BC-AD 1603 (Vol. I) (2000, ISBN 9780563487142)
- A History of Britain: The British Wars 1603-1776 (Vol. II) (2001, ISBN 9780563487180)
- A History of Britain: The Fate of Empire 1776-2000 (Vol. III) (2002, ISBN 9780563487197)
- Hang Ups: Essays on Art (2004, ISBN 9780563521730)
- Rough Crossings (2005, ISBN 9780060539160)
- Simon Schama's Power of Art (2006, ISBN 9780061176104)
- The American Future: A History (2009, ISBN 9780060539238)
- Scribble, Scribble, Scribble: Writing on Politics, Ice Cream, Churchill and My Mother (2011, ISBN 9780062009869)
- The Story of the Jews: Finding the Words, 1000 BCE–1492 CE, (Volume I) (2013, Bodley Head, ISBN 9781847921321)
- The Face of Britain: The Nation Through Its Portraits (2015, ISBN 9780241963715)
- Belonging: The Story of the Jews, 1492–1900, (Volume II) (2017, Bodley Head, ISBN 9781847922809)
- Foreign Bodies: Pandemics, Vaccines and the Health of Nations (2023, ISBN 9781471169892)

Television documentaries

- Landscape and Memory (1995), in five parts
- Rembrandt: The Public Eye and the Private Gaze (1995)
- A History of Britain by Simon Schama – BBC (2000), in 15 parts
- Murder at Harvard – PBS (2003)
- Rough Crossings – BBC (2005)
- Simon Schama's Power of Art – BBC (2006), in eight parts
- The American Future: A History – BBC (2008), in four parts
- Simon Schama's John Donne – BBC (2009)
- Simon Schama's Obama's America – BBC (2009)
- Simon Schama's Shakespeare – BBC (2012)
- The Story of the Jews – BBC (2013), in five parts
- Schama on Rembrandt: Masterpieces of the Late Years – BBC (2014)
- The Face of Britain by Simon Schama – BBC (2015), in five parts
- Civilisations – BBC (2018), five of nine parts
- The Romantics and Us with Simon Schama – BBC (2020) 3 episodes: Passions of the People; The Chambers of the Mind; Tribes
- Simon Schama's History of Now – BBC (2022) 3 episodes: Truth and Democracy; Equality; The Price of Plenty
- Simon Schama: The Holocaust, 80 Years On (2025). PBS.
- Simon Schama: The Road to Auschwitz. BBC (2025)
