= The Story of the Jews (TV series) =

British television series

- Genre: History documentary
- Based on: The Story of the Jews by Simon Schama
- Directed by: Tim Kirby
- Presented by: Simon Schama

Production
- Executive producer: Nicolas Kent
- Producer: Tim Kirby

The Story of the Jews is a television series, in five parts, presented by British historian Simon Schama. It was broadcast in the United Kingdom on BBC Two in September 2013 and in the United States on PBS in March and April 2014.

It is based on Schama's book of the same title, which is being published in three volumes. The first volume, Finding the Words 1000BCE – 1492CE, was published in September 2013. The second volume, entitled Belonging: The Story of the Jews 1492–1900, was published by Bodley Head in October 2017.

== Episodes ==
No. in series	Title	Directed by	Written by	Original release date	UK viewers (millions)
1	"In the Beginning"	Tim Kirby	Simon Schama	1 September 2013	N/A
2	"Among Believers"	Tim Kirby	Simon Schama	8 September 2013	N/A
3	"A Leap of Faith"	Tim Kirby	Simon Schama	15 September 2013	N/A
4	"Over the Rainbow"	Tim Kirby	Simon Schama	22 September 2013	N/A
5	"Return"	Tim Kirby	Simon Schama	29 September 2013	N/A

== Reception ==
=== United Kingdom ===
In a review for The Daily Telegraph, Neil Midgley described the first episode as a "resounding success", saying: "Schama told the story efficiently and evocatively – and deftly picked out stories that would illustrate his overarching thesis about how Judaism managed to survive...In Schama’s view, to be a Jew is to be verbal....By the end of this first episode, Schama had given the title of his programme an intriguing double meaning. Over its four remaining parts, The Story of the Jews promises to be not only a chronological history, but also a common narrative of what unifies and fortifies Jewish people".

For The Guardian, critic Arifa Akbar said: "Simon Schama's story was as much an investigation into identity as it was the beginning of a difficult history".

Writing in The Observer, Andrew Anthony called it "an astonishing achievement, a TV landmark".

=== United States ===
David Hinckley, reviewing for the New York Daily News, said: "Schama doesn’t downplay the persecution and martyrdom of Jews throughout history. Neither does he let this interfere with his clear mission of portraying Jewish history as a tale of triumph and celebration".

Robert Lloyd, TV critic for the Los Angeles Times, said that Schama "has produced a series that is at once informative, entertaining, thought-provoking, heart-wrenching and, in its final episode, in which he confronts the paradoxes of modern Israel, more than a little maddening. Like the religion and the culture that surrounds it, each of which loves an argument, it is inconclusive and open to discussion".
