= A History of Britain (TV series) =

2000 British television documentary series

- Genre: History
- Presented by: Simon Schama
- Composer: John Harle
- Country of origin: United Kingdom
- Original language: English
- No. of series: 3
- No. of episodes: 15

Production
- Executive producer: Martin Davidson
- Producers: Janet Lee; Liz Hartford
- Running time: 59 minutes
- Production companies: BBC; History Channel

Original release
- Network: BBC Two
- Release: 30 September 2000 – 18 June 2002

A History of Britain is a BBC documentary series written and presented by Simon Schama, first transmitted in the United Kingdom from 30 September 2000.

A study of the history of the British Isles, each of the 15 episodes allows Schama to examine a particular period and tell of its events in his own style. All the programmes are of 59 minutes' duration and were broadcast over three series, ending 18 June 2002.

The series was produced in conjunction with the History Channel and the executive producer was Martin Davidson. The music was composed by John Harle, whose work was augmented by vocal soloists such as Emma Kirkby and Lucie Skeaping. Schama's illustrative presentation was aided by readings from actors, including Lindsay Duncan, Michael Kitchen, Christian Rodska, Samuel West and David Threlfall.

== Background ==
When Simon Schama was approached by the BBC to make the series, he knew that it would be a big commitment and took a long time to decide whether it was something he wanted to do. He surmised that if he were to take it on, he would want to "dive in" and be very involved with the production. Besides writing the scripts, which the historian saw as a "screenplay", he also had input into other aspects, including the choice of locations. He was concerned that even 15 hour-long programmes would not be enough to tell a story of such magnitude. Accordingly, he and the producers determined that to give each king and queen absolute equal coverage was out of the question: "That way lies madness," he said. Instead, he worked out the essential themes and stories that demanded to be related.

Schama explained why, at the time of its making, it was right to produce another historical documentary on Great Britain. At that moment, he argued, Britain was entering a new phase of its relationship with Europe and the rest of the world, and where it would end up depended a great deal on where it's come from. He stated that the stories needed to be told again and again so that future generations could get a sense of their identity. Furthermore, he believed that Britain's history comprised a number of tales worth telling:

"No matter how much you tell them, you never quite know ... how compelling and moving they are."

=== Criticisms ===
The main criticism of A History of Britain is that it mostly revolves around England and its history, rather than that of Great Britain in its entirety. It has been criticised for giving short shrift to the Celtic inhabitants and civilisation of Great Britain, including England, and for including Ireland, even though Ireland is not part of Great Britain (Northern Ireland being part of the United Kingdom, but not being part of Great Britain, while the Republic of Ireland is an independent and sovereign state). In a BBC interview, Simon Schama stated that rather than designating different periods of screen time to different nations, he focused on the relationships between the different nations, primarily England and Scotland. By the latter episodes, however, all "Three Kingdoms" are parts of the United Kingdom.

== Episodes ==
"From its earliest days, Britain was an object of desire. Tacitus declared it pretium victoriae – 'worth the conquest', the best compliment that could occur to a Roman. He had never visited these shores but was nonetheless convinced that Britannia was rich in gold."

— Simon Schama's opening narration

=== Series 1 (2000) – At the Edge of the World?: 3000 BC–1603 AD ===
No. overall	No. in season	Title	Time	Original release date
1	1	"Beginnings"	3100 BC – 1000 AD	30 September 2000
Simon Schama starts his story in the Stone Age village of Skara Brae, Orkney. Over the next four thousand years Romans, Anglo-Saxons, Norsemen, Danes, and Christian missionaries arrive, fight, settle and leave their mark on what will become the nations of Britain.
2	2	"Conquest!"	1000–1087	4 October 2000
1066 is not the best remembered date in British history for nothing. In the space of nine hours whilst the Battle of Hastings raged, everything changed. Anglo-Saxon England became Norman and, for the next 300 years, its fate was decided by dynasties of Norman rulers.
3	3	"Dynasty"	1087–1216	11 October 2000
There is no saga more powerful than that of the warring dynasty – domineering father, beautiful, scheming mother and squabbling, murderous sons and daughters, (particularly the nieces). In the years that followed the Norman Conquest, this was the drama played out on the stage of British history.
4	4	"Nations"	1216–1348	18 October 2000
This is the epic account of how the nations of Britain emerged from under the hammer of England's "Longshanks" King Edward I, with a sense of who and what they were, which endures to this day.
5	5	"King Death"	1348–1500	25 October 2000
It took only six years for the plague to ravage the British Isles. Its impact was to last for generations. But from the ashes of this trauma an unexpected and unique class of Englishmen emerged.
6	6	"Burning Convictions"	1500–1558	1 November 2000
Simon Schama charts the upheaval caused as a country renowned for its piety, whose king styled himself Defender of the Faith, turns into one of the most aggressive proponents of the new Protestant faith.
7	7	"The Body of the Queen"	1558–1603	8 November 2000
This is the story of two queens: Elizabeth I of England, the Protestant virgin, and Mary, Queen of Scots, the Catholic mother. It is also the story of the birth of a nation, Magna Britannia – Great Britain.

=== Series 2 (2001) – The British Wars: 1603–1776 ===
No. overall	No. in season	Title	Time	Original release date
8	1	"The British Wars"	1603–1649	8 May 2001
The turbulent civil wars of the early seventeenth century would culminate in two events unique to British history; the public execution of a king and the creation of a republic. Schama tells of the brutal war that tore the country in half and created a new Britain – divided by politics and religion and dominated by the first truly modern army, fighting for ideology, not individual leaders.
9	2	"Revolutions"	1649–1689	15 May 2001
Political and religious revolutions racked Britain after Charles I's execution, when Britain was a joyless, kingless republic led by Oliver Cromwell. His rule became so unpopular that for many it was a relief when the monarchy was restored after his death, but Cromwell was also a man of vision who brought about significant reforms.
10	3	"Britannia Incorporated"	1689–1750	22 May 2001
As the new century dawned, relations between Scotland and England had never been worse. Yet half a century later the two countries would be making a future together based on profit and interest. The new Britain was based on money, not God.
11	4	"The Wrong Empire"	1750–1800	29 May 2001
The exhilarating and terrible story of how the British Empire came into being through its early settlements—the Caribbean through the sugar plantations (and helped by slavery), the land that later became the United States and India through the British East India Company—and how it eventually came to dominate the world. A story of exploration and daring, but also one of exploitation, conflict, and loss.

=== Series 3 (2002) – The Fate of Empire: 1776–1965 ===
No. overall	No. in season	Title	Time	Original release date
12	1	"Forces of Nature"	1780–1832	28 May 2002
Britain never had the kind of revolution experienced by France in 1789, but it did come close. In the mid-1770s the country was intoxicated by a great surge of political energy. Re-discovering England's wildernesses, the intellectuals of the "romantic generation" also discovered the plight of the common man, turning nature into a revolutionary force.
13	2	"Victoria and Her Sisters"	1830–1910	4 June 2002
As the Victorian era began, the massive advance of technology and industrialisation was rapidly reshaping both the landscape and the social structure of the whole country. To a much greater extent than ever before women would take a centre-stage role in shaping society.
14	3	"The Empire of Good Intentions"	1830–1925	11 June 2002
This episode charts the chequered life of the liberal empire from Ireland to India – the promise of civilisation and material betterment and the delivery of coercion and famine.
15	4	"The Two Winstons"	1910–1965	18 June 2002
In the final episode, Schama examines the overwhelming presence of the past in the British twentieth century and the struggle of leaders to find a way to make a different national future. As towering figures of the twentieth century, Winston Churchill and George Orwell (through his Nineteen Eighty-Four character Winston Smith) in their different ways exemplify lives spent brooding and acting on that imperial past and ,most movingly for us, writing and shaping its history.

"... It's our cultural bloodstream, the secret of who we are, and it tells us to let go of the past, even as we honour it. To lament what ought to be lamented and to celebrate what should be celebrated. And if in the end, that history turns out to reveal itself as a patriot, well then I think that neither Churchill nor Orwell would have minded that very much, and as a matter of fact, neither do I."

— Simon Schama, in closing

== DVDs and books ==
A History of Britain: Volume 2

The series is available in the UK (Regions 2 and 4) as a six-disc DVD (BBCDVD1127, released 18 November 2002) in widescreen PAL format. Its special features include short interviews with Simon Schama, a text-based biography of the historian, and the inaugural BBC History Lecture of Schama's "Television and the Trouble with History".

In Region 1, it was released as A History of Britain: the complete collection on 26 November 2002. A five-disc set, the episodes were presented in full-frame NTSC format and included various text-based features. It was re-released on 22 July 2008 in a new slim-case version. It was released again in Region 1 on 17 August 2010 in a format nearly identical to the UK version noted above.

Three accompanying books by Simon Schama have been published by BBC Books. All entitled A History of Britain, they were subtitled as follows:

- At the Edge of the World?: 3000 BC–AD 1603 (ISBN 0-563-38497-2, 19 October 2000)
- The British Wars: 1603–1776 (ISBN 0-563-53747-7, 4 October 2001)
- The Fate of Empire: 1776–2001 (ISBN 0-563-53457-5, 24 October 2002)

== See also ==
- This Sceptred Isle (radio series)
- Andrew Marr's History of Modern Britain
