= The Story of the Jews (book) =

Book on jewish history by Simon Schama

- Cover of the first volume
- Author: Simon Schama
- Language: English
- Subject: Jewish history
- Published: 2013 (first volume); 2017 (second volume)
- Publisher: The Bodley Head (UK)
- Publication place: United Kingdom
- Pages: 512 (first volume); 790 (second volume)

The Story of the Jews: Finding the Words, 1000 BCE–1492 CE is a book by the British historian Simon Schama, which is being published in three volumes. The first volume, entitled Finding the Words, 1000BCE – 1492CE, was published in the United Kingdom by The Bodley Head in September 2013. The second volume, entitled Belonging: The Story of the Jews, 1492–1900, was published by The Bodley Head in October 2017.

A television series, based on the book, was broadcast in the United Kingdom on BBC Two in September 2013 and in the United States on PBS in March and April 2014.

== Reception ==
In his review of the first volume for The New York Times, Dwight Garner wrote:

"Mr. Schama's 'The Story of the Jews' is exemplary popular history. It's engaged, literate, alert to recent scholarship and, at moments, winningly personal... Mr. Schama is Jewish, but not especially religious... His loyalty is obviously to the hard evidence. At the same time, he declares that "the 'minimalist' view of the Bible as wholly fictitious, and unhooked from historical reality, may be as much of a mistake as the biblical literalism it sought to supersede."

Former Archbishop of Canterbury, Rowan Williams, who reviewed Belonging for the New Statesman, described it as "immensely erudite – and compulsively readable" and said: "The importance of Schama's book is that it forces the reader to think about how the long and shameful legacy of Christian hatred for Jews is reworked in 'enlightened' society".

== See also ==
- Jewish history
- The Story of the Jews (TV series)
- Belonging: The Story of the Jews, 1492–1900, Volume two
