= Monumenta Serica =

- Discipline: Chinese studies
- Language: English
- Edited by: Zbigniew Wesołowski

Publication details
- History: 1935–present
- Publisher: Routledge

Standard abbreviations
- ISO 4: Monum. Serica

Indexing
- ISSN: 0254-9948 (print); 2057-1690 (web)

Monumenta Serica: Journal of Oriental Studies (Chin. 華裔學志, Huayi xuezhi) is an international academic journal of sinology. It was published by Monumenta Serica Institute in Sankt Augustin, and now by Routledge. The editor-in-chief was until 2012 Roman Malek and is now Zbigniew Wesołowski.

The journal was founded in 1935 in the Fu Jen Catholic University in Peking by Franz Xaver Biallas. It is dedicated to the study of Chinese culture and to the publication of academic contributions in the field of Chinese studies in English, German and French. The journal is published annually. Back issues of Monumenta Serica are accessible through JSTOR. This journal is indexed in SCOPUS.
