= Abitbol =

Abitbol is a Sephardic Jewish surname common in North African countries, France, and Israel. Notable people with the surname include:

- Ninette Al-Abitbol (born 1929), Tunisian singer
- Michel Abitbol (born 1943), Israeli historian
- Sarah Abitbol (born 1975), French pair skater
- Sylvain Abitbol, Canadian engineer
- William Abitbol (1949–2016), French politician
- Pascale Abitbol (born 1982), Canadian ex-porn actress and HIV activist

== See also ==
- Jewish name, paragraph about Oriental Jewish names

Other variations of the name:

- Abiteboul
- Abutbul
- Botbol, with a comprehensive etymology
