= Abutbul =

Abutbul is a surname. People with this surname include:

- Alon Abutbul (1965–2025), Israeli actor, announcer, and film producer
- Asi Abutbul (born 1975), Israeli mafia boss
- Shay Abutbul (born 1983), Israeli footballer
- Moshe Abutbul (born 1984), Israeli footballer
- Moshe Abutbul (born 1965), Israeli politician

== See also ==
- Jewish name, paragraph about Oriental Jewish names

Other variations of the name:

- Abitbol
- Abiteboul
- Botbol, with a comprehensive etymology
