= Botbol =

During the 19th century, Botbol was one of the twenty most common surnames within the Moroccan Jewish community. The origin of this surname (and its variants: Abitbol and Boutboul) is likely derived from the Hebrew shoresh ט.ב.ל (ṭ.b.l) meaning "purification in a ritual bath". The name means "father of the bath", i.e., the one in charge of this ritual bath. In Arabic (بوطبول), it means "father of the tambourine" which indicates a profession, i.e., the maker or salesman of this popular Moroccan musical instrument, and is the name of a musical family from Fes. The Botbol name is now found in Morocco and in the Moroccan diaspora.

Many of the Botbol families in Morocco arrived between 1478, persecuted by the Spanish Inquisition, and 1492 when the Catholic Monarchs signed the Alhambra Decree, the edict ordering the expulsion of all Jews from Spain and its possessions. Some of the Botbols may have gone to Antwerp at this time, and become the Botbijl families found there today. Botbols were known in early 16th century Flanders of that era, and were referred to as Maghrebi Jews.

== See also ==
- Jewish name, paragraph about Oriental Jewish names
- Haim Botbol

Other variations of the name:

- Abitbol
- Abiteboul
- Abutbul
