= Abiteboul =

Abiteboul is a surname. Notable people with the surname include:

- Cyril Abiteboul (born 1977), French motor racing engineer and manager
- Michaël Abiteboul, French actor
- Serge Abiteboul (born 1953), French computer scientist

== See also ==
- Jewish name, paragraph about Oriental Jewish names

Other variations of the name:

- Abitbol
- Abutbul
- Botbol, with a comprehensive etymology
