= Jewish name =

Types of Jewish names, specifically one's given name, have varied over time and by location and ethnic group. Other categories of names used by Jewish people include the surname and the religious name known as the Hebrew name.

== Given names ==
Given names have a range of customs within different Jewish ethnic groups. Common given names, however, remain similar in many parts of the Jewish community, with many of them based on figures in the Hebrew Bible or honoring relatives.

=== Sephardi customs ===
Sephardim have often named newborn children in honor of their living grandparents. This practice typically uses these names in a specific order: the father's father, the father's mother, the mother's father, the mother's mother.

=== Ashkenazi customs ===
In stark contrast to Sephardi customs, Ashkenazim have a longstanding superstition about naming a child after a living person. Instead, only a deceased relative's name may be used. According to this superstition, naming a child after a living person could appear as though you are waiting for that person to die. Though the practice is rooted in long-standing custom, it has no setting in Jewish law. While not many Jewish people necessarily believe in the superstition per se, the lack of precedence makes practices such as a (living) father naming his son after himself an unusual occurrence for Ashkenazim.

A peculiarity of Yiddish names for Ashkenazi Jews was recording legal names in diminutive form. These diminutive forms could be either hypocoristics (pet names) or deprecative. This tradition was more widespread for female names rather than for male names. There was a wide variety of suffixes added to a normative form of the name. Depending on the country of residence, the suffixes were borrowed into Yiddish, e.g., from German, Russian, Polish, Belarusian, etc. languages. In many cases these suffixes were used to create nicknames from regular words. Some examples: Leiba, Leibuța (Romanian-language) from Leib, Berele or Bereleyn from Berl/Berel, Khaytsi, Chayka from Chaya, Rivka from Riva which itself was from Rebecca, Motke, Mordkhe, or Mordka from Mordechai, Feygele, Faygele from Feigl/Foigl ("bird", which could also be used as a female name), etc.

== Surnames ==
While many surnames are associated with Jewish people in the United States, there are only three surnames rooted in ancient Jewish culture: Kohen (or Cohen), Levy, and Israel. These names originate with the Israelite tribes which bear the same name. Variations on these names are common and most often reflect different ways of transliterating the Hebrew version.

Apart from these original surnames, the surnames of Jewish people of the present have typically reflected family history and their ethnic group within the Jewish people. Sephardic communities began to take on surnames in the Middle Ages (specifically c.10th and 11th centuries), and these surnames reflect the languages spoken by the Sephardic subset of the Jewish diaspora, including Spanish, Portuguese, and Italian. Ashkenazi communities of Northern and Eastern Europe, however, did not take on surnames until later (c.14th and 15th centuries). As with many other European communities, it was not unusual for a surname of this time period to reflect patrilineal relationships (e.g. Abraham's son --> Abramson, Abramsohn, etc.).

== Hebrew name ==
The Hebrew name is a Jewish practice rooted in the practices of early Jewish communities and Judaism. This Hebrew name is used for religious purposes, such as when the child is called to read the Torah at their b'nei mitzvah.

The baby's name is traditionally announced during the brit milah (circumcision ceremony) for male babies, typically on the eighth day after his birth. Female babies may also have a naming ceremony, known by several different names, including zeved habat, b'rit bat, and b'rit chayim. This may be held between 7 and 30 days after her birth.

The Hebrew name follows a particular format that reflects gender:

- Male: [Hebrew given name] ben [parents' Hebrew given names]
  - Example: Abraham ben David v'Sarah
- Female: [Hebrew given name] bat [parents' Hebrew given names]
  - Example: Leah bat David v'Sarah
- Neutral: [Hebrew given name] mibeit or mimishpachat [parents' Hebrew given names]
  - Example: Lior mibeit David v'Sarah OR Lior mimishpachat David v'Sarah

Prior to the destruction of the Second Temple, priestly titles were also incorporated after the patronymic, e.g. Flavius Josephus's Hebrew name was Yosef ben Matityahu haCohen (Hebrew: יוסף בן מתתיהו הכהן).

The chosen Hebrew name can be related to the child's secular given name, but it does not have to be. The name is typically Biblical or based in Modern Hebrew.

For those who convert to Judaism and thus lack parents with Hebrew names, their parents are given as Abraham and Sarah, the first Jewish people of the Hebrew Bible. Those adopted by Jewish parents use the names of their adoptive parents.

== See also ==
- Bilingual Hebrew-Yiddish tautological names
- List of Jewish nobility
- Family name etymology
- Jewish Encyclopedia articles
- Jewish name change
- Zeved habat
- Hollekreisch
- Brit milah

== Bibliography ==
- Schreiber, Mordecai; Schiff, Alvin I.; Klenicki, Leon (2003). "Names". The Shengold Jewish Encyclopedia. Schreiber Pub. ISBN 978-1-887563-77-2.
- Weiss, Nelly (2002). The origin of Jewish family names: morphology and history. P. Lang. ISBN 978-0-8204-5644-7.
- G. Buchanan Gray, Hebrew Proper Names, London, 1898;
- T. Nöldeke, in Cheyne and Black, Encyc. Bibl. (with extensive bibliography). Talmudic: Schorr, in He-Ḥaluẓ, vol. ix.;
- Hirsch Perez Chajes, Beiträge zur Nordsemitischen Onomatologie;
- Bacher, in R. E. J. xiv. 42–47. Modern: Andræe, Zur Volkskunde der Juden, pp. 120–128;
- Zunz, Namen der Juden, in Ges. Schriften, ii. 1-82;
- Löw, Lebensalter, pp. 92–109;
- Orient, Lit. vi. 129–241; vii. 42, 620;
- Steinschneider, in Hebr. Bibl. pp. 556, 962;
  - idem, in Z. D. M. G. xxxii. 91;
- Hyamson, Jewish Surnames, in Jewish Literary Annual, 1903, pp. 53–78;
- M. Sablatzky, Lexikon der Pseudonymen Hebr. Schriftsteller, Berdychev, 1902.
- What’s in a Name? 25 Jewish Stories. Jewish Museum of Switzerland, 2022, ISBN 978-3-907262-34-4
