= Jewish ethnic divisions =

Jewish subgroups

Jewish ethnic divisions refers to many distinctive communities within the world's Jewish population. Although external observers have only described "Jewish" as an ethnicity, there are distinct ethnic subdivisions among Jews, most of which are primarily the result of geographic branching from an originating Israelite population, mixing with local communities, and subsequent independent evolutions.

During the millennia of the Jewish diaspora, the communities would develop under the influence of their local environments; political, cultural, natural and demographic. Today, the manifestation of these differences among the Jews can be observed in Jewish cultural expressions of each community, including Jewish linguistic diversity, culinary preferences, liturgical practices, religious interpretations, and degrees and sources of genetic admixture.

== Historical background ==
=== Ancient Israel and Judah ===
The full extent of the cultural, linguistic, religious and other differences which existed among the Israelites in antiquity is unknown. Following the defeat of the Kingdom of Israel in the 720s BCE and the Kingdom of Judah in 586 BCE, the Jewish people became dispersed throughout much of the Middle East and Africa, especially in Egypt and the Maghreb to the west, as well as in Yemen to the south, and in Mesopotamia to the east. The Jewish population in ancient Israel was severely reduced by the Jewish–Roman wars and by the later hostile policies of the Christian emperors against non-Christians, but the Jews always retained a presence in the Levant. Paul Johnson writes of this time: "Wherever towns survived, or urban communities sprang up, Jews would sooner or later establish themselves. The near-destruction of Palestinian Jewry in the second century turned the survivors of Jewish rural communities into marginal town-dwellers. After the Arab conquest in the seventh century, the large Jewish agricultural communities in Babylonia were progressively wrecked by high taxation, so that there too the Jews drifted into towns and became craftsmen, tradesmen, and dealers. Everywhere these urban Jews, the vast majority literate and numerate, managed to settle, unless penal laws or physical violence made it impossible."

Jewish communities continued to exist in Palestine in relatively small numbers: during the early Byzantine 6th century there were 43 communities; during the Islamic period and the intervening Crusades there were 50 (including Jerusalem, Tiberias, Ramleh, Ashkelon, Caesarea, and Gaza); and during the early Ottoman 14th century there were 30 (including Haifa, Shechem, Hebron, Ramleh, Jaffa, Gaza, Jerusalem, and Safed). The majority of the Jewish population during the High Middle Ages lived in Iberia (what is now Spain and Portugal) and in the region of Mesopotamia and Persia (what is now Iraq and Iran), the former known as the Sephardim and the latter known as the Mizrahim. A substantial population existed also in central Europe, the Ashkenazim. Following the expulsion of Sephardim from Iberia during the 15th century, a mass migration into the Ottoman Empire swelled the size of many eastern communities including those in Palestine; the town of Safed reached 30,000 Jews by end of the 16th century. The 16th century saw many Ashkenazi Kabbalists drawn to the mystical aura and teachings of the Jewish holy city. Johnson notes that in the Arab-Muslim territories, which included most of Spain, all of North Africa, and the Near East south of Anatolia in the Middle Ages, the Jewish condition was easier, as a rule, than it was in Europe.

Over the centuries following the Crusades and Inquisition, Jews from around the world began emigrating in increasing numbers. Upon arrival, these Jews adopted the customs of the Mizrahi and Sephardi communities into which they moved.

=== Diaspora ===
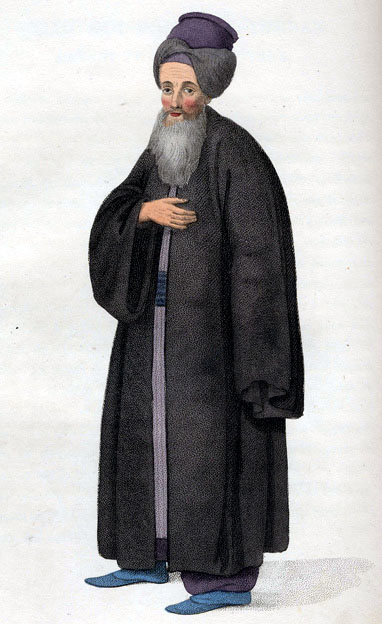
Painting of a Jewish man from the Ottoman Empire, 1779

Following the failure of the second revolt against the Romans and the exile, Jewish communities could be found in nearly every notable center throughout the Roman Empire, as well as scattered communities found in centers beyond the Empire's borders in northern Europe, in eastern Europe, in southwestern Asia, and in Africa. Farther to the east along trade routes, Jewish communities could be found throughout Persia and in empires even farther east including in India and China. In the Early Middle Ages of the 6th to 11th centuries, the Radhanites traded along the overland routes between Europe and Asia earlier established by the Romans, dominated trade between the Christian and the Islamic worlds, and used a trade network that covered most areas of Jewish settlement.

In the middle Byzantine period, the khan of Khazaria in the northern Caucasus and his court converted to Judaism, partly in order to maintain neutrality between Christian Byzantium and the Islamic world. This event forms the framework for Yehuda Halevi's work The Kuzari (c.1140), but how much the traces of Judaism within this group survived the collapse of the Khazar empire is a matter of scholarly debate. Arthur Koestler, in his book The Thirteenth Tribe (1976), and more recently Shlomo Sand in his book The Invention of the Jewish People (2008), theorized that East-European Jews are more ethnically Khazar than they are Semitic. Genetic studies have not supported this theory.

In western Europe, following the collapse of the Western Roman Empire in 476, and especially after the re-orientation of trade caused by the Moorish conquest of Iberia in the early 8th century, communications between the Jewish communities in northern regions of the former Western Roman Empire became sporadic. At the same time, rule under Islam, even with dhimmi status, resulted in freer trade and communications within the Muslim world, and the communities in Iberia remained in frequent contact with Jewry in the Maghreb and the Middle East, but communities further afield, in central and south Asia and central Africa, remained more isolated, and they continued to develop their own unique traditions. For the Sephardim in Spain, it resulted in a "Hebrew Golden Age" from the 10th century to the 12th century. The 1492 expulsion from Spain by the Catholic Monarchs, however, forced Sephardim to hide and disperse themselves to France, Italy, England, the Netherlands, Scandinavia, parts of what is now northwestern Germany, and other existing Jewish communities in Christian Europe.

The vast majority of Sephardim found refuge within the Ottoman Empire’s long-established, already-existing Jewish communities and respective Jewish communities in the Kingdom of Morocco, across the Strait of Gibraltar. Smaller groups of Sephardim also migrated to other areas of West Asia, and, eventually, they migrated to the Americas during the early 17th century.

In northern and Christian Europe during this period, financial competition developed between the authority of the Pope in Rome and nascent states and empires. In western Europe, the conditions of Jewry differed between the communities within the various countries, and over time, depending on background conditions, the conditions of the communities changed. With both push and pull factors operating at the same time, the emigration of Ashkenazim to the Americas would increase in the early 18th century, beginning with the emigration of German-speaking Ashkenazi Jews and ending with a tidal wave of emigration of Yiddish-speaking Ashkenazim between 1880 and the early 20th century, as conditions deteriorated in the failing Russian Empire. After the Holocaust, which resulted in the murder of more than six million Jews who were living in Europe, North America became home to the majority of Jewish people.

== Modern divisions ==
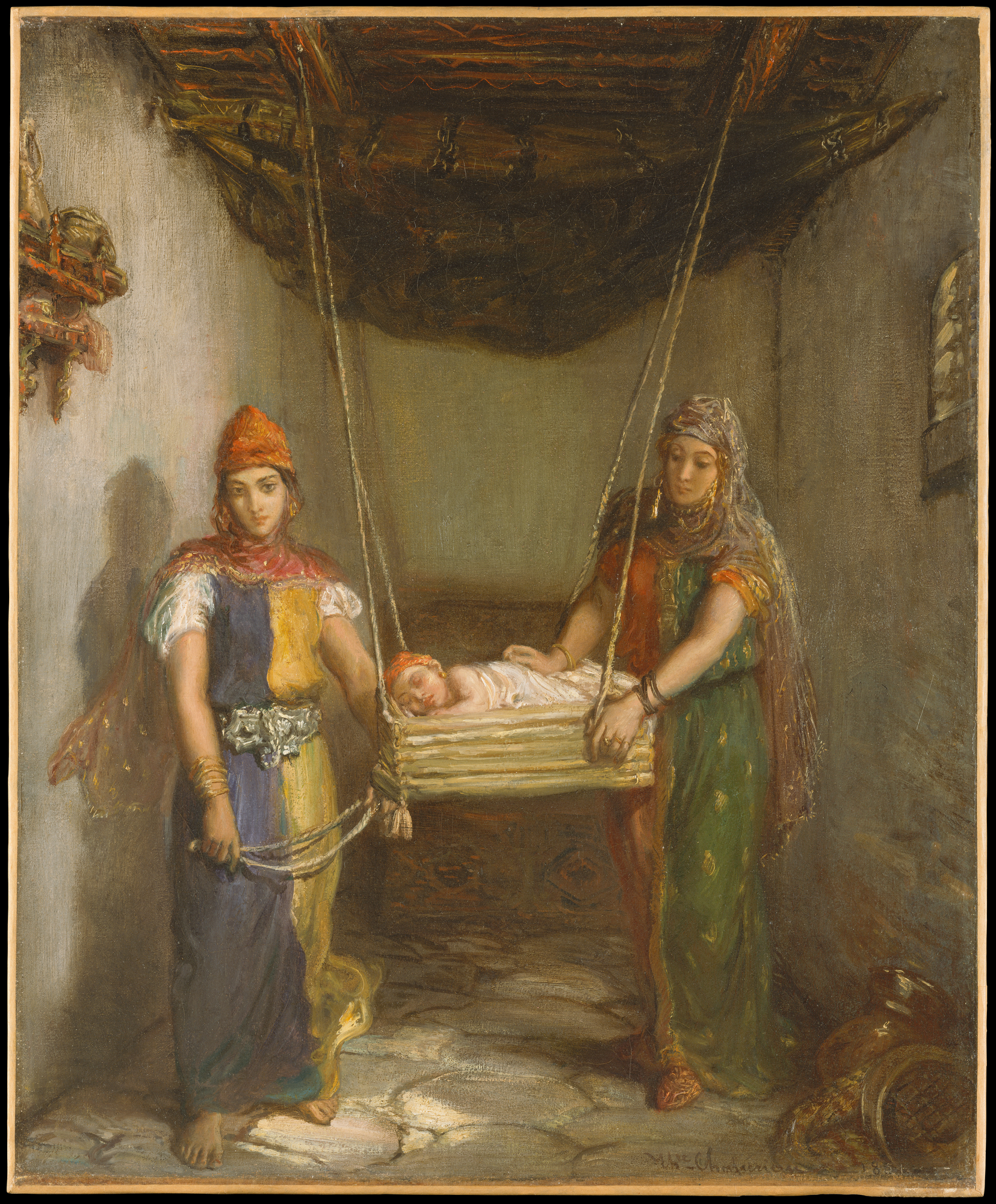
Jewish women in Algeria, 1851

Historically, European Jews have been classified as belonging to two major groups: the Ashkenazim, or "Germanics" (Ashkenaz meaning "Germany" in Medieval Hebrew), denoting their Central European base, and the Sephardim, or "Spaniards" (Sepharad meaning "Hispania" or "Iberia" in Hebrew), denoting their Spanish and Portuguese base. A third historic term Mizrahim, or "Easterners" (Mizrach being "east" in Hebrew) has been used to describe other non-European Jewish communities which have bases located further to the east; however, the usage of the term Mizrahim has changed both over time and relative to the location where it is used. One definition is the Jews who never left the Middle East, in contrast to the Sephardim who went west to Spain and Portugal, Morocco, Algeria, Tunisia, Libya, and Egypt. A similar three-part distinction in the Jewish community of 16th-century Venice is noted by Johnson as being "divided into three nations, the Penentines from Spain, the Levantines who were Turkish subjects, and the Natione Tedesca or Jews of German origin..." The far more recent meaning of the Mizrahim, to include both Middle Eastern and North African Jews in a single term, developed within Zionism during the mid-1940s, when diverse Jewish communities from Middle Eastern and North African countries were each combined in one demographic as the target of an immigration plan. According to some sources, the current sense of the term as the name of an ethnic group distinct from European-born Jews was invented at this time. To some, the term Mizrahim constitutes a third major layer. Following the partition of Mandatory Palestine and the establishment of the State of Israel in 1948, often-forced migration in subsequent years contributed to communities of Mizrahim in the newly-constructed Israel.

The divisions between these major groups are rough and their boundaries are not solid. The Mizrahim for example, are a heterogeneous collection of Jewish communities which are often as unrelated to each other as they are to any of the earlier mentioned Jewish groups. In traditional religious usage and sometimes in modern usage, however, the Mizrahim overlap with termed Sephardim (due to factors including the similar styles of liturgy), despite independent evolutions from Sephardim proper. Therefore, among such Mizrahim there are Iranian Jews, Iraqi Jews, Egyptian Jews, Sudanese Jews, Tunisian Jews, Algerian Jews, Moroccan Jews, Lebanese Jews, Libyan Jews, Syrian Jews, Bukharan Jews, Georgian Jews, Kurdish Jews, Afghan Jews, and Mountain Jews. Other Jewish communities that evolved separately from Sephardim in Asia are Indian Jews, including the Malabar Yehuddim (Cochin Jews), Bene Israel, Bnei Menashe and Bene Ephraim, and Chinese Jews (most notably the Kaifeng Jews).

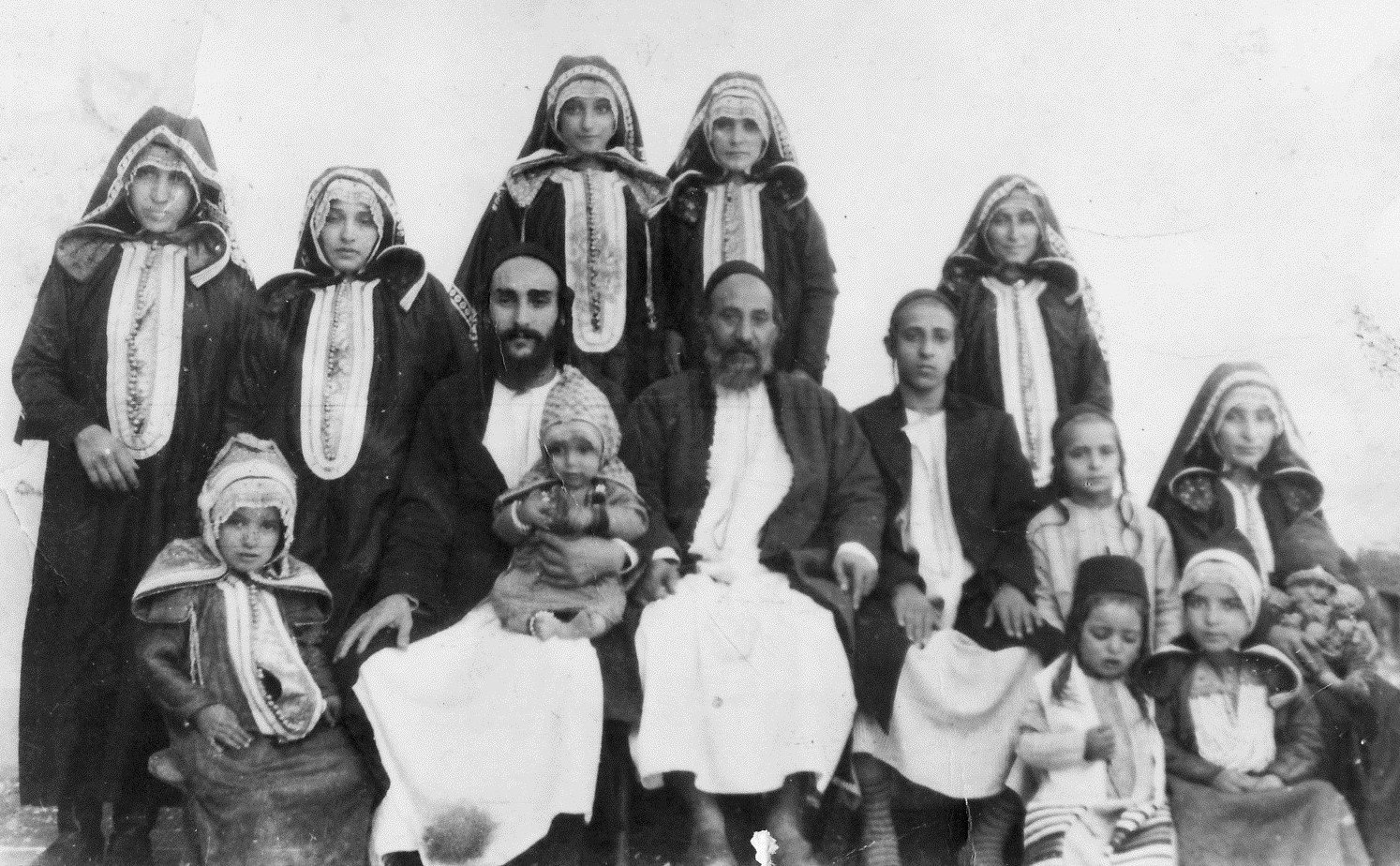
The Suleiman ben Pinchas Cohen family of Yemen, circa 1944

Yemenite Jews ("Teimanim") from Yemen are sometimes included, although their style of liturgy is unique compared to other Mizrahim. Additionally, there is a difference between the pre-existing Middle Eastern and North African Jewish communities as distinct from the descendants of those Sephardi migrants who established themselves in the Middle East and North Africa after the expulsion of the Jews from Spain by the Catholic Monarchs in 1492, and in 1497 from the expulsion decreed in Portugal.

Distinct smaller Jewish groups include the Italian rite Jews (i.e. only descendants of ancient Italian Jewish community without later migrants to Italy); the Romaniotes of Greece; various African Jews, including most numerously the Beta Israel of Ethiopia; as well as various other distinct but now extinct communities.

Despite this diversity, Ashkenazi Jews represent the bulk of modern Jewry, estimated at between 70% and 80% of the world’s total Jewish population; prior to World War II and the Holocaust however, Ashkenazim comprised 90%. Ashkenazim developed in Europe, but underwent massive emigration in search of better opportunities and during periods of civil strife and warfare. As a result of this, they became the overwhelming majority of Jews in the New World continents and countries, which previously were without native European or Jewish populations. These include the United States, Mexico, Canada, Argentina, and Brazil. Venezuela and Panama are exceptions, as Sephardim compose the majority of these two countries’ Jewish communities. In France, more recent Sephardi immigrants (and their descendants) from Morocco, Algeria, and Tunisia now outnumber the pre-existing Ashkenazim.

=== Genetic studies ===
Despite the evident diversity which is displayed by the world's distinctive Jewish populations, both culturally and physically, genetic studies have demonstrated that most of these Jewish communities are genetically related to each other, ultimately originating within a common ancient Israelite population that underwent geographic branching and subsequent independent evolutions.

A study which was published by the National Academy of Sciences stated that "The results support the hypothesis that the paternal gene pools of Jewish communities from Europe, North Africa, and the Middle East descended from a common Middle Eastern ancestral population, and suggest that most Jewish communities have remained relatively isolated from neighboring non-Jewish communities during and after the Diaspora." Researchers expressed surprise at the remarkable genetic uniformity they found among modern Jews, no matter where the diaspora has become dispersed around the world.

Moreover, DNA tests have demonstrated that there has been substantially less inter-marriage in most of the various Jewish ethnic divisions over the last 3,000 years than there was in other populations. The findings lend support to traditional Jewish accounts which accredit their founding to exiled Israelite populations, and they also counter the theory that many or most of the world's Jewish populations were founded by entirely gentile populations that adopted the Jewish faith, as in the notable case of the historic Khazars. Although groups such as the Khazars could have been absorbed into modern Jewish populations – in the Khazars' case, absorbed into the Ashkenazim – genetic evidence does not support the idea that they formed a large percentage of the ancestors of modern Ashkenazi Jews, and it is much less likely that they were also the ancestors of the Ashkenazim.

Previously, the Israelite origin which was identified in the world's Jewish populations was only attributed to the men who had migrated from the Middle East and then forged the currently-known communities with "the women from each local population whom they took as wives and converted to Judaism". Research in Ashkenazi Jews has suggested that, in addition to the male founders, significant female founder ancestry might also derive from the Middle East, with about 40% of the current Ashkenazi population descended matrilineally from just four women, or "founder lineages", that were "likely from a Hebrew/Levantine mtDNA pool" originating in the Near East in the 1st and 2nd centuries CE.

Points in which Jewish groups differ are the source and proportion of genetic contribution from host populations. For example, the Teimanim differ to a certain extent from other Mizrahim, as well as from Ashkenazim in the proportion of sub-Saharan African gene types which have entered their gene pools. Among Yemenite Jews, the average stands at 5–10%, due to the relative genetic isolation of Yemenite Jews this is only a quarter of the frequency of the non-Jewish Yemenite sample, which can reach 35%. In Ashkenazi Jews, the proportion of male indigenous European genetic admixture amounts to around 0.5% per generation over an estimated 80 generations, and a total admixture estimate around 12.5%. The only exception to this among Jewish communities is in the Beta Israel (Ethiopian Jews); a 1999 genetic study came to the conclusion that "the distinctiveness of the Y-chromosome haplotype distribution of Beta Israel Jews from conventional Jewish populations and their relatively greater similarity in haplotype profile to non-Jewish Ethiopians are consistent with the view that the Beta Israel people descended from ancient inhabitants of Ethiopia who converted to Judaism." Another 2001 study did, however, find a possible genetic similarity between 11 Ethiopian Jews and 4 Yemenite Jews from the population samples.

DNA analysis further determined that modern Jews of the priesthood tribe—"Cohanim"—share a common ancestor dating back about 3,000 years. This result is consistent for all Jewish populations around the world. The researchers estimated that the most recent common ancestor of modern Cohanim lived between 1000 BCE (roughly the time of the Biblical Exodus) and 586 BCE, when the Babylonians destroyed the First Temple. They found similar results analyzing DNA from Ashkenazi and Sephardi Jews. The scientists estimated the date of the original priest based on genetic mutations, which indicated that the priest lived roughly 106 generations ago, between 2,650 and 3,180 years ago depending whether one counts a generation as 25 or 30 years.

A study of Ashkenazi mitochondrial DNA by Richards et al. (2013) suggested that, though Ashkenazi paternal lineages were of Middle Eastern origin, the four main female Ashkenazi founders had descent lines that were established in Europe 10,000 to 20,000 years in the past while most of the remaining minor founders also have a deep European ancestry. The majority of Ashkenazi maternal lineages were not brought from the Levant, nor recruited in the Caucasus, but were assimilated within Europe. The study estimated that 80 percent of Ashkenazi maternal ancestry comes from women indigenous to Europe, 8 percent from the Near East, and the remainder undetermined. According to the study these findings 'point to a significant role for the conversion of women in the formation of Ashkenazi communities.' Some geneticists, such as Doron Behar, a geneticist at Gene by Gene in Houston, US, and Karl Skorecki, at the Technion – Israel Institute of Technology in Haifa, are skeptical of these results.

A 2014 study by Fernández et al. found that Ashkenazi Jews display a frequency of haplogroup K in their maternal DNA, suggesting an ancient Near Eastern matrilineal origin, similar to the results of the Behar study in 2006. Fernández noted that this observation clearly contradicts the results of the 2013 study led by Richards that suggested a European source for 3 exclusively Ashkenazi K lineages.

A study by Haber et al. (2013) noted that while previous studies of the Levant, which had focused mainly on diaspora Jewish populations, showed that the "Jews form a distinctive cluster in the Middle East", these studies did not make clear "whether the factors driving this structure would also involve other groups in the Levant". The authors found strong evidence that modern Levant populations descend from two major apparent ancestral populations. One set of genetic characteristics which is shared with modern-day Europeans and Central Asians is most prominent in the Levant among "Lebanese, Armenians, Cypriots, Druze and Jews, as well as Turks, Iranians and Caucasian populations". The second set of inherited genetic characteristics is shared with populations in other parts of the Middle East as well as some African populations. Levant populations in this category today include "Palestinians, Jordanians, Syrians, as well as North Africans, Ethiopians, Saudis, and Bedouins". Concerning this second component of ancestry, the authors remark that while it correlates with "the pattern of the Islamic expansion", and that "a pre-Islamic expansion Levant was more genetically similar to Europeans than to Middle Easterners," they also say that "its presence in Lebanese Christians, Sephardi and Ashkenazi Jews, Cypriots and Armenians might suggest that its spread to the Levant could also represent an earlier event". The authors also found a strong correlation between religion and apparent ancestry in the Levant:

"all Jews (Sephardi and Ashkenazi) cluster in one branch; Druze from Mount Lebanon and Druze from Mount Carmel are depicted on a private branch; and Lebanese Christians form a private branch with the Christian populations of Armenia and Cyprus placing the Lebanese Muslims as an outer group. The predominantly Muslim populations of Syrians, Palestinians and Jordanians cluster on branches with other Muslim populations as distant as Morocco and Yemen."

A 2013 study by Doron M. Behar, Mait Metspalu, Yael Baran, Naama M. Kopelman, Bayazit Yunusbayev et al. integrated genotypes from newly collected data—1,774 samples from 106 Jewish and non-Jewish populations—in their assessment of potential Ashkenazi Jewish genetic origins. After examining these potential origins with a dataset which included "the full extent of the Khazar realm of the sixth to tenth centuries," the authors found the same results as other similar studies, including some by the same authors. They write that their findings support the claim that "Ashkenazi, North African, and Sephardi Jews share substantial genetic ancestry and that they derive it from Middle Eastern and European populations, with no indication of a detectable Khazar contribution to their genetic origins."

The authors' findings were in line with "This most comprehensive study... does not change and in fact reinforces the conclusions of multiple past studies, including ours and those of other groups (Atzmon and others, 2010; Bauchet and others, 2007; Behar and others, 2010; Campbell and others, 2012; Guha and others, 2012; Haber and others; 2013; Henn and others, 2012; Kopelman and others, 2009; Seldin and others, 2006; Tian and others, 2008). We confirm the notion that the Ashkenazi, North African, and Sephardi Jews share substantial genetic ancestry and that they derive it from Middle Eastern and European populations, with no indication of a detectable Khazar contribution to their genetic origins."

The authors also reanalyzed the 2012 study of Eran Elhaik, and found that "The provocative assumption that Armenians and Georgians could serve as appropriate proxies for Khazar descendants is problematic for a number of reasons as the evidence for ancestry among Caucasus populations do not reflect Khazar ancestry". Also, the authors found that "Even if it were allowed that Caucasus affinities could represent Khazar ancestry, the use of the Armenians and Georgians as Khazar proxies is particularly poor, as they represent the southern part of the Caucasus region, while the Khazar Khaganate was centered in the North Caucasus and further to the north. Furthermore, among populations of the Caucasus, Armenians and Georgians are geographically the closest to the Middle East, and are therefore expected a priori to show the greatest genetic similarity to Middle Eastern populations." Concerning the similarity of South Caucasus populations to Middle Eastern groups which was observed at the level of the whole genome in one recent study (Yunusbayev and others, 2012). The authors found that "Any genetic similarity between Ashkenazi Jews and Armenians and Georgians might merely reflect a common shared Middle Eastern ancestry component, actually providing further support to a Middle Eastern origin of Ashkenazi Jews, rather than a hint for a Khazar origin". The authors claimed "If one accepts the premise that similarity to Armenians and Georgians represents Khazar ancestry for Ashkenazi Jews, then by extension one must also claim that Middle Eastern Jews and many Mediterranean European and Middle Eastern populations are also Khazar descendants. This claim is clearly not valid, as the differences among the various Jewish and non-Jewish populations of Mediterranean Europe and the Middle East predate the period of the Khazars by thousands of years".

A 2014 study by Carmi et al. published by Nature Communications found that the Ashkenazi Jewish population originates from an approximately even mixture of Middle Eastern and European ancestry. According to the authors, that mixing likely occurred some 600–800 years ago, followed by rapid growth and genetic isolation (rate per generation 16–53%;). The study found that all Ashkenazi Jews descent from around 350 individuals, and that the principal component analysis of common variants in the sequenced AJ samples, confirmed previous observations, namely, the proximity of Ashkenazi Jewish cluster to other Jewish, European and Middle Eastern populations".

== Geographic distribution ==
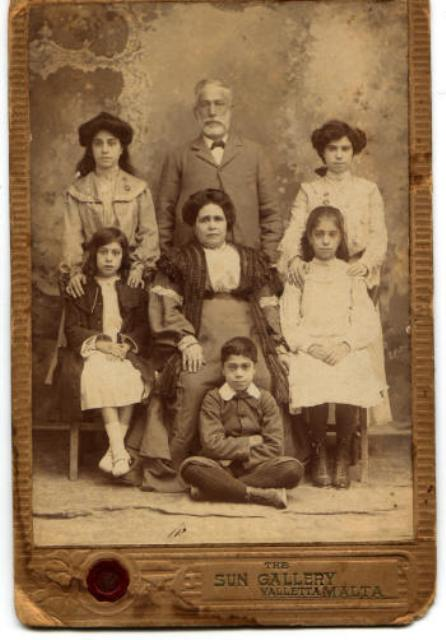
Maltese Jews in Valletta, 19th century

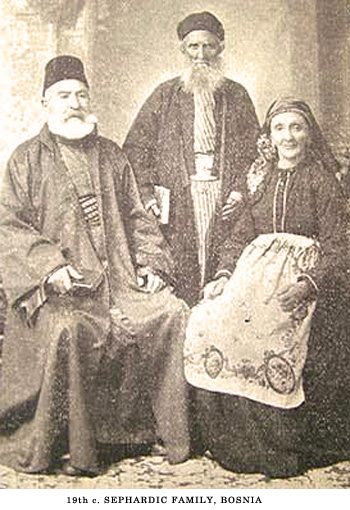
Sephardi Jewish family descendants of Spanish expellees in Bosnia, 19th century

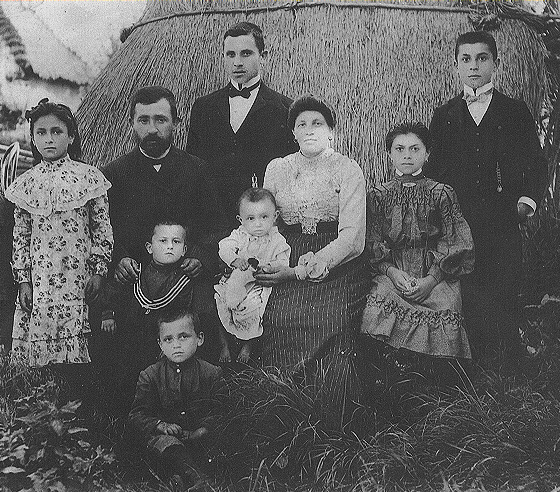
An Eastern Ashkenazic family living in the Shtetl of Romanivka, circa 1905

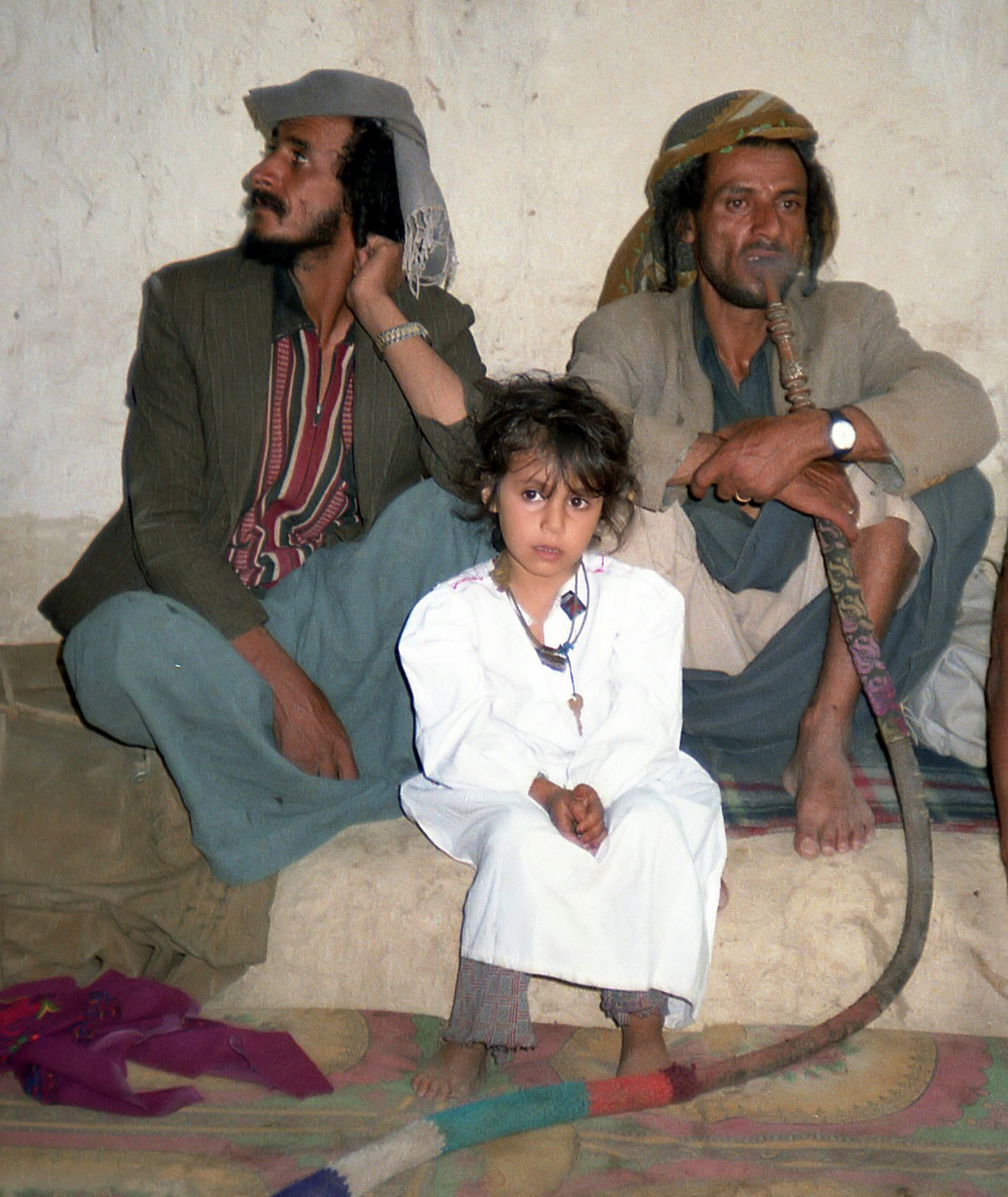
Yemenite Jews in Sa'dah, smoking Nargile.

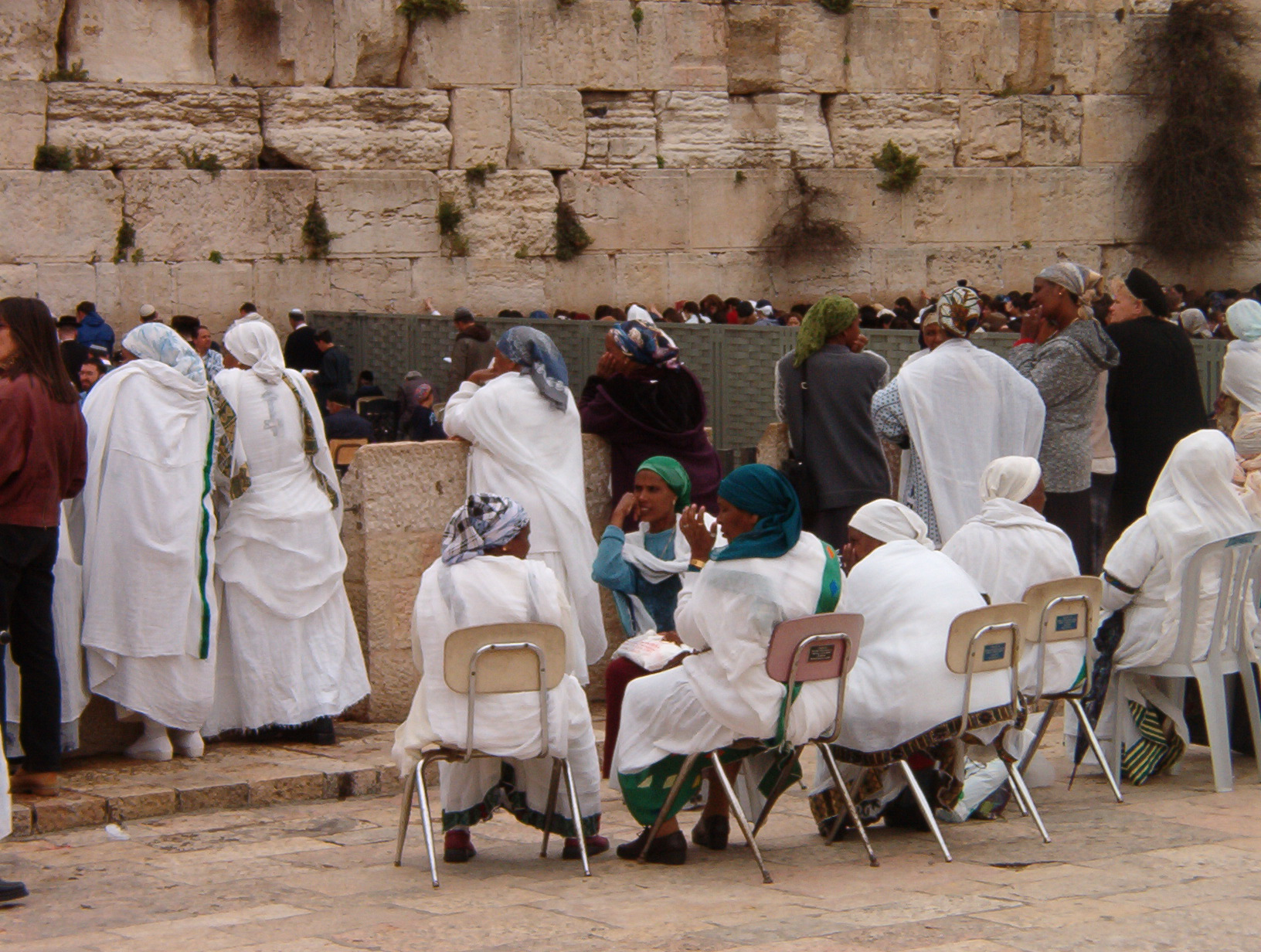
Ethiopian Jewish women at Jerusalem's Western Wall, 2006

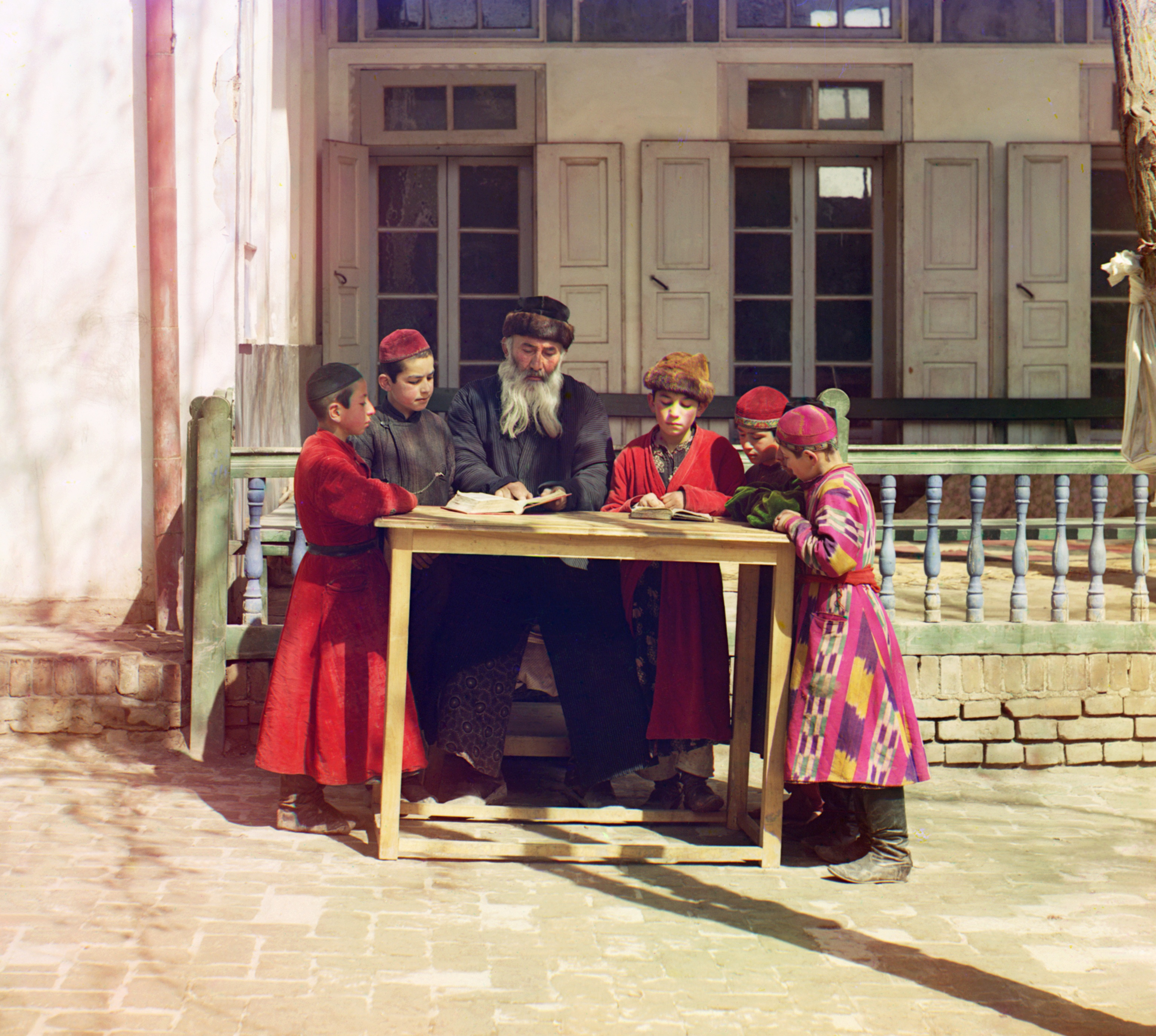
Bukharan Jewish teacher and students in Samarkand, modern-day Uzbekistan, circa 1910

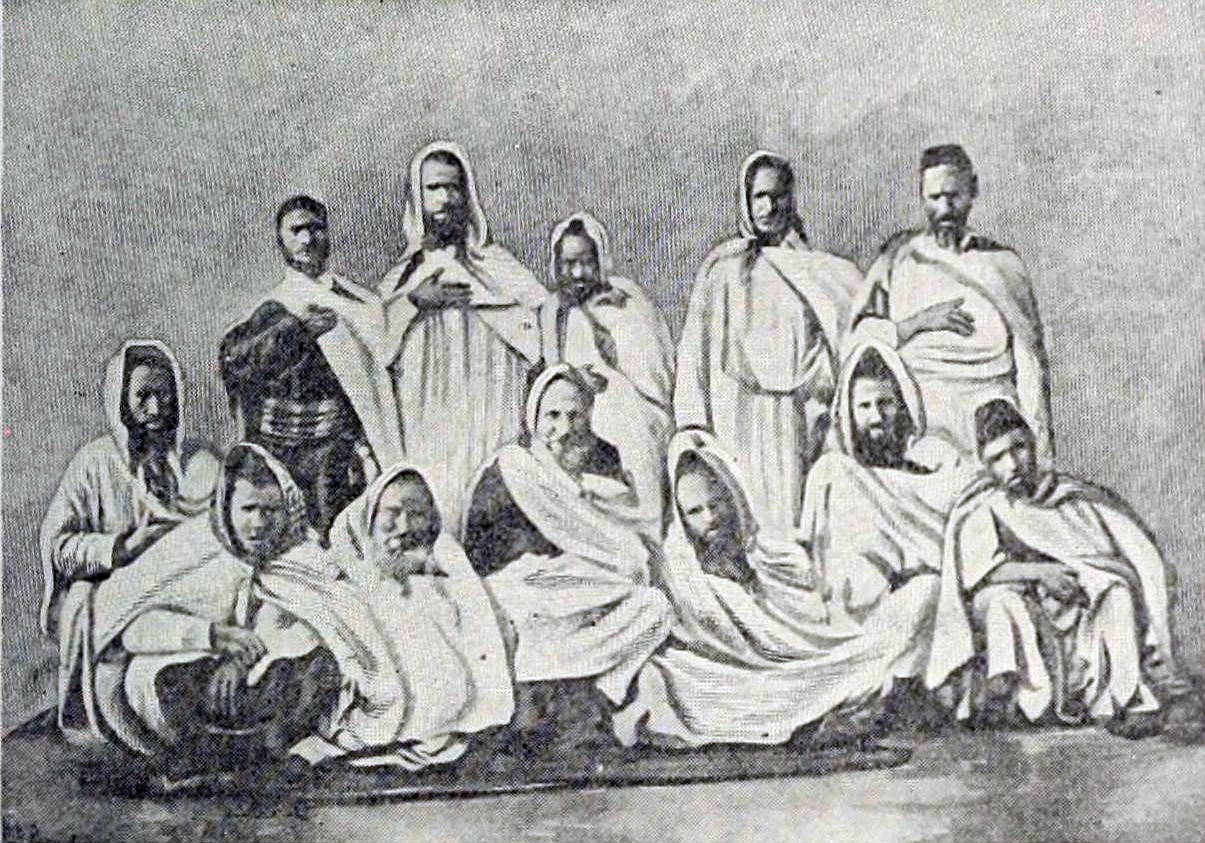
Berber Jews from the Atlas Mountains of Morocco, circa 1900

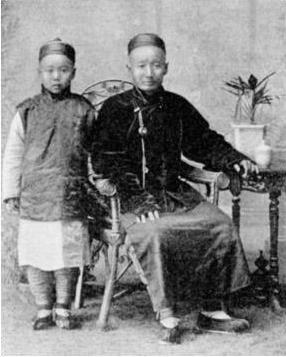
Chinese Jews from the city of Kaifeng, China, circa 1900

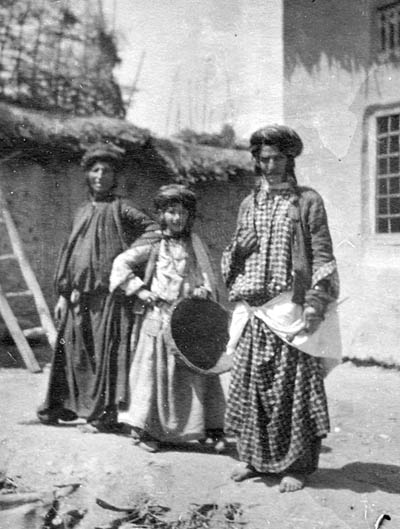
Kurdish Jews in Rawanduz, Iraqi Kurdistan, 1905

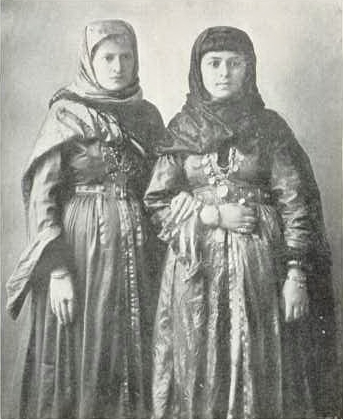
Juhur Imuni (Mountain Jews) girls of the Caucasus, 1913

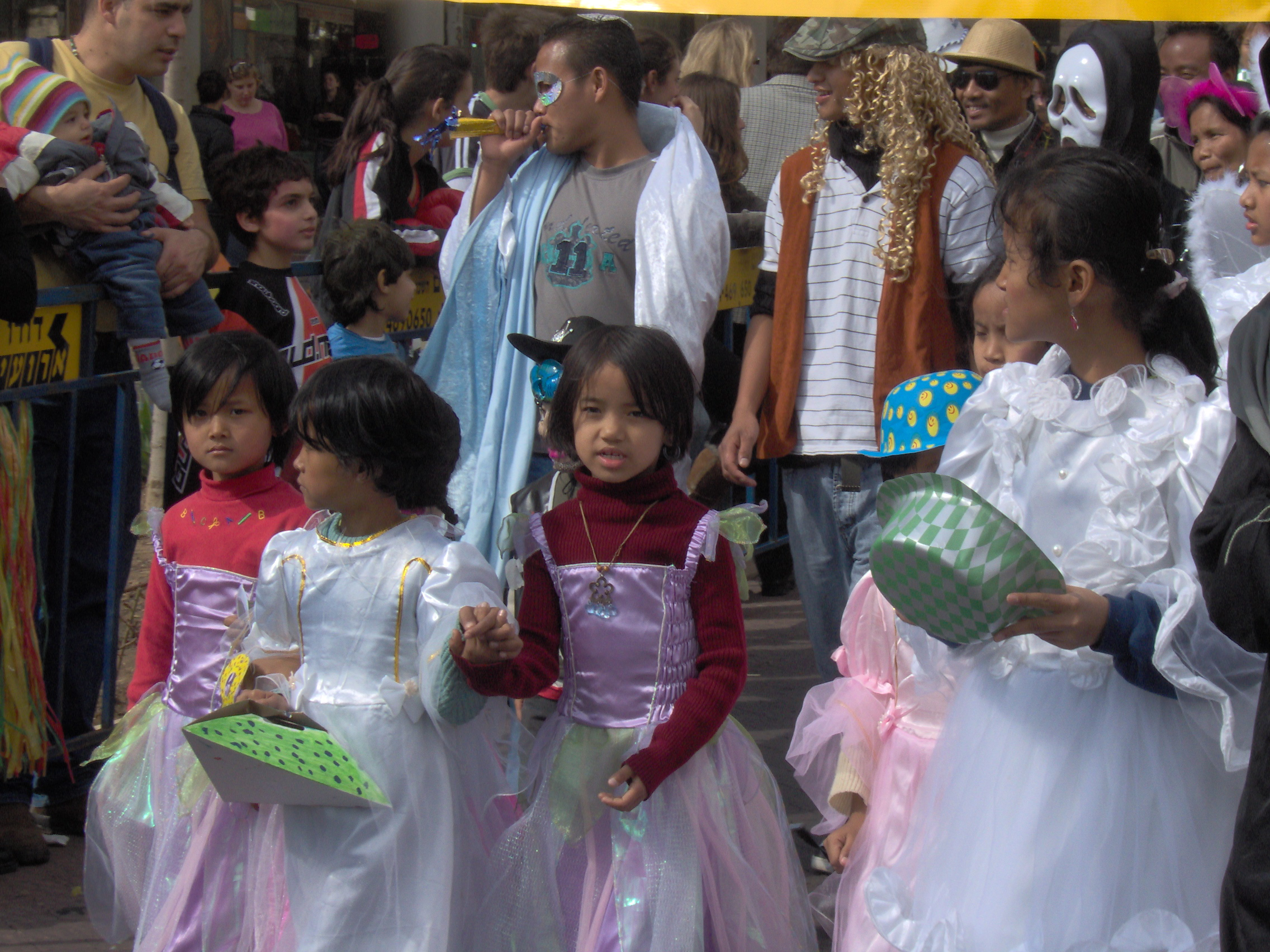
Bnei Menashe Jews from Northeastern India, celebrating Purim, in Karmiel, Israel.

Because of the independence of local communities, Jewish ethnic divisions, even when they circumscribe differences in liturgy, language, cuisine and other cultural accoutrements, are more often a reflection of geographic and historical isolation from other communities. It is for this reason that communities are referred to by referencing the historical region in which the community cohered when discussing their practices, regardless of where those practices are found today.

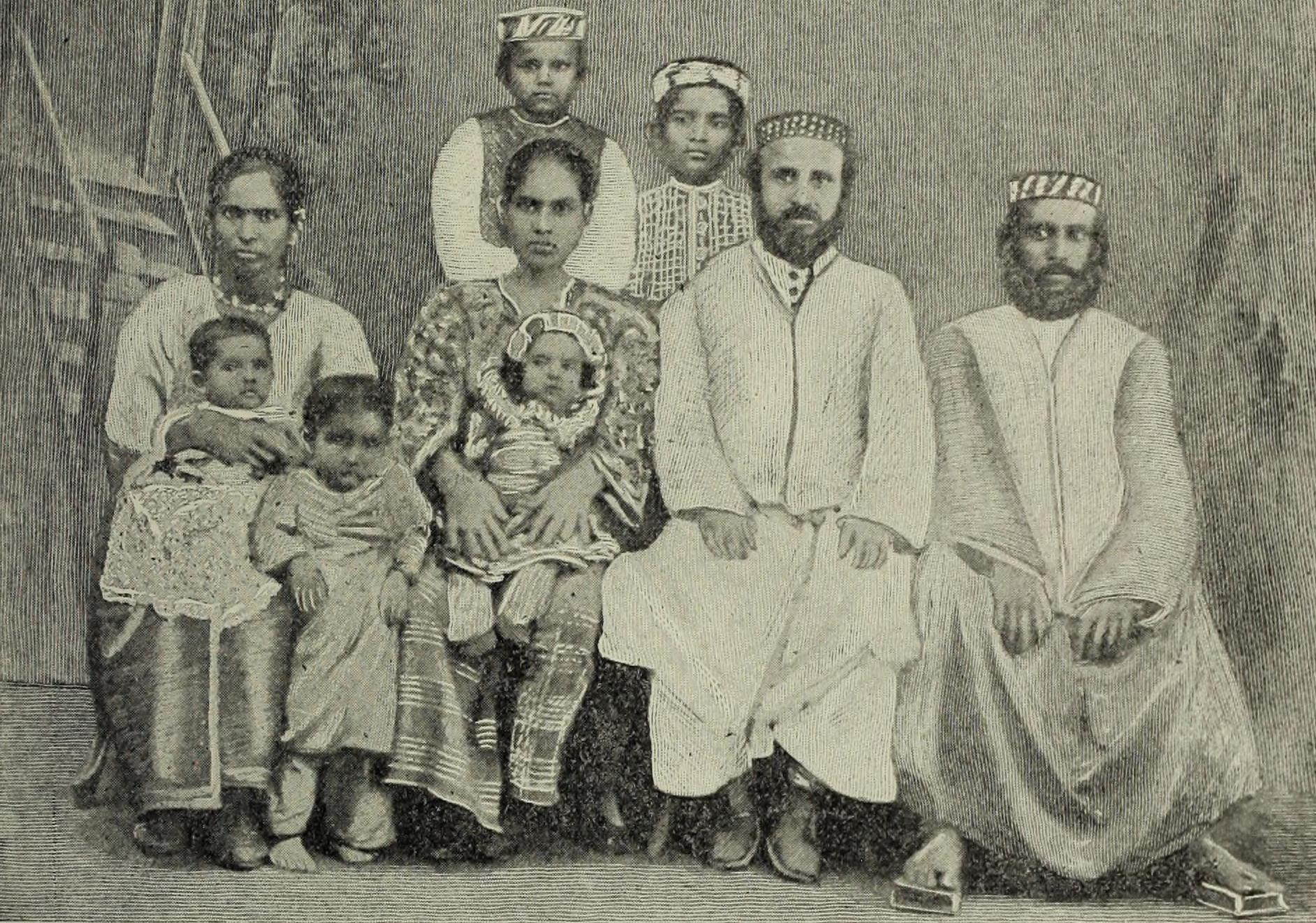
A Malabar Jewish family in Cochin, India, circa 1900

The smaller groups number in the hundreds to tens of thousands, with the Georgian Jews (also known as Gruzinim or Qartveli Ebraeli) and Beta Israel being most numerous at somewhat over 100,000 each. Many members of these groups have now emigrated from their traditional homelands, largely to Israel. For example, only about 10 percent of the Gruzinim remain in Georgia.

A brief description of the extant communities, by the geographic regions with which they are associated, is as follows:

=== Europe ===
Ashkenazi Jews (plural Ashkenazim) are the descendants of Jews who migrated into northern France and Germany around 800–1000, and later into Eastern Europe.

Among the Ashkenazim there are a number of major subgroups:

- German Jews are affiliated with the Lowlands, historical Germany, Switzerland, and Scandinavia. They originally spoke Western Yiddish, which had less Slavic influence than other Yiddish dialects. By the early 20th century, Yiddish was in decline in this population, and assimilation was proceeding rapidly.
- Litvaks, or Lithuanian Jews, emerged as a distinct group in the Grand Duchy of Lithuania (present-day Lithuania, Belarus, Ukraine, Latvia and the northeastern Suwałki region of Poland). They have historically spoken the Eastern Yiddish dialect Litvish (Lithuanian Yiddish).
- Galitzianers, or Galician Jews, trace their origins to Galicia, Western Ukraine (current Lviv, Ivano-Frankivsk, and Ternopil regions) and South-Eastern Poland.
- Jews from central Poland (origins from former Congress Poland), while having fewer specificities and innovations in local cultures than neighboring Litvaks or Galitzianers, nevertheless have had a significant coherent Ashkenazi culture for centuries, and the Poylish dialect of Eastern Yiddish.
- Oberlanders, originating in the Oberland region of Hungary and the district surrounding Bratislava in Slovakia, originally spoke Western Yiddish. In modern times before the Holocaust, many Oberlander Jews migrated to urban centers of the Austro-Hungarian Empire and adopted German or Hungarian as their first language.
- Unterlanders, who resided in the northeastern region of the Kingdom of Hungary (present-day Slovakia, Zakarpattia Oblast in Ukraine and Northern Transylvania.)
- According to some sources, Jews in Udmurtia and Tatarstan can be seen as ethnic group - dos udmurtishe yidntum.
- Russian Jews, who have had a presence in Russia and areas connected to it since the times of the Kievan Rus.

Sephardic Jews (plural Sephardim) are Jews whose ancestors lived in Iberia prior to 1492.

There are multiple subgroups among the Sephardim:

- Western Sephardim, or the Spanish and Portuguese Jews are a distinct subgroup of Iberian Jews. They are largely descended from Jews who lived as New Christians in the Iberian Peninsula during the immediate generations following the forced expulsion of unconverted Jews from Spain in 1492 and from Portugal in 1497.
- Eastern Sephardim are a subgroup of Iberian Jews descended from families exiled from Iberia in the 15th century. Most of them settled in various parts of the Ottoman Empire, while some settled as far as the Malabar coast, importing their culture and customs to the local Cochin Jews.
- North African Sephardim descend from exiled Iberic Jewish families of the late 15th century and North African Maghrebi Jewish communities already settled in Morocco, Algeria, Tunisia and Libya. They have historically spoken Haketia, a Judaeo-Spanish language derived from Old Spanish, Hebrew and Aramaic.
- Belmonte Jews are a Jewish community in Belmonte that lived in Portugal as Crypto-Jews for centuries. They survived in secrecy for hundreds of years by maintaining a tradition of endogamy and hiding all external signs of their faith.
- Xuetes, or Majorcan Jews, are descendants of Jews who were forcibly converted to Christianity and today live in the Balearic Islands. Some maintained their faith, while others observed a syncretist form of Christian worship known as Xueta Christianity.

Jewish communities in Europe that are neither Ashkenazic nor Sephardic:

- Italkim trace their origins as far back as the 2nd century BCE. It is thought that some families descend from Jews deported from Judaea in 70 CE. They have traditionally spoken a variety of Judeo-Italian languages (Italkian) and used Italian Hebrew as a pronunciation system.
- Romaniotes are a distinct Jewish community that has resided in Greece and neighboring areas for over 2,000 years. They have historically spoken the Judæo-Greek dialect Yevanic, although due to the majority of them being murdered in the Holocaust, combined with assimilation post-WW2 there are no longer any speakers of it.
- San Nicandro Jews – A group of mid-20th century converts from Italy.

=== The Caucasus and the Crimea ===
- Juhurim, better known as the Mountain Jews, are descendants of Persian Jews sometime considered part of the wider Mizrahi group from Iran and Babylonian Jews from Baghdad who settled in the eastern and northern Caucasus (modern Azerbaijan, Chechnya, Dagestan and Ingushetia). It is believed that they had reached Persia from Ancient Israel as early as the 8th century BCE. The Juhuro survived numerous historical vicissitudes by settling in extremely remote and mountainous areas. They were known to be accomplished warriors and horseback riders. Their language is Judeo-Tat, an ancient Southwest Iranian language which integrates many elements of Ancient Hebrew and Aramaic.
- Gruzim, or the Georgian Jews, are one of the oldest surviving Jewish communities tracing back to the Babylonian captivity sometime considered part of the wider Mizrahi group in the 6th century BCE. The 2,600-year history of the Georgian Jews was unique in its complete absence of antisemitism prior to Russia's annexation of Georgia. They have traditionally spoken Kivruli, a Judaeo-Georgian dialect with a lot of Hebrew and Aramaic loan words. As a result of the Post-Soviet aliyah, the vast majority of Georgian Jews now live in Israel.
- Krymchaks and Crimean Karaites are Turkic-speaking Jews of the Crimea and Eastern Europe. The Krymchaks practice Rabbinic Judaism, while the Karaim practice Karaite Judaism. Whether they are primarily the descendants of Israelite Jews who adopted Turkic language and culture, or the descendants of Turkic converts to Judaism, is still debated, although the question is irrelevant as far as Jewish law is concerned, according to which they are Jews, regardless of whether by Israelite descent or by conversion.
- Subbotniks are a dwindling group of Jews from Azerbaijan and Armenia, whose ancestors were Russian peasants who converted to Judaism for unknown reasons in the 19th century.

=== North Africa ===
Mostly Sephardi Jews and collectively known as Maghrebi Jews and sometime considered part of the wider Mizrahi group:

- Moroccan Jews migrated to this area after the destruction of the First Temple in Jerusalem and settled among the Berbers. They were later met by a second wave of migration from the Iberian Peninsula in the period immediately preceding and following the 1492 Alhambra Decree, when the Jews were expelled from kingdoms of Spain and Portugal. Their descendants in the Amazon basin are known as Amazonian Jews, many of whom remain in traditional Jewish communities but others mixed into the local population and developed a separate ethnic identity, often with mixed religious practices.
- Algerian Jews: There is evidence of Jewish settlements in Algeria since at least the late Roman period, followed by Jewish immigrants came to North Africa after fleeing from the persecutions of the Visigothic king Sisebut, and finally the largest segment which were Sephardic Jews forced from Spain due to the Inquisition.
- Libyan Jews stretch back to the 3rd century BCE, when Cyrenaica was under Greek rule. The Jewish population of Libya, a part of the Berber Jewish community, continued to populate the area continuously until the modern times.
- Tunisian Jews: similar to the Libyan Jews.
- Berber Jews: Jewish communities of the Atlas Mountains.
- Sudanese Jews are Jewish community that lived in Sudan, and was concentrated in the capital Khartoum, they were mainly of Sephardic background, who had constructed a synagogue and a Jewish school.
- Egyptian Jews are generally Jews thought to have descended from the great Jewish communities of Hellenistic Alexandria, mixed with many more recent groups of immigrants. These include Babylonian Jews following the Muslim conquest; Jews from Palestine following the Crusades; Sephardim following the expulsion from Spain; Italian Jews settling for trading reasons in the 18th and 19th centuries; and Jews from Aleppo in the late 19th and early 20th centuries.

=== West Asia ===
Jews with ancestry from diaspora groups in West Asia are generally referred to as Mizrahi Jews as an umbrella term. More precise terms for particular groups of Mizrahi Jews are:

- Babylonian Jews, also known as Iraqi Jews, are descendants of the Jewish people who have lived in Mesopotamia since the time of the Assyrian conquest of Samaria.
- Kurdish Jews from Kurdistan, as distinct from the Persian Jews of central and eastern Persia, as well as from the lowland Babylonian Jews of Mesopotamia.
- Persian Jews from Iran (commonly called Parsim in Israel, from the Hebrew) have a 2700-year history. One of the oldest Jewish communities of the world, Persian Jews constitute the largest Jewish community in West Asia outside Israel.
- Yemenite Jews (called Temanim, from the Hebrew), as well as Adeni Jews are Oriental Jews whose geographic and social isolation from the rest of the Jewish community allowed them to maintain a liturgy and set of practices that are significantly distinct from other Oriental Jewish groups; they themselves comprise three distinctly different groups, though the distinction is one of religious law and liturgy rather than of ethnicity.
- Jewish Palestinians are Jewish inhabitants of Palestine and Egypt throughout certain periods of Middle Eastern history. After the modern State of Israel was born, nearly all native Palestinian Jews became citizens of Israel, and the term "Palestinian Jews" largely fell into disuse.
- Lebanese Jews are the Jews that lived around Beirut. After the Lebanese Civil War, the community's emigration appears to have been completed; few remain in Lebanon today.
- Omani Jews are the early Jewish community of Sohar. They are thought to be descendants of Ishaq bin Yahuda, a Sohari merchant around the first millennium. This community is believed to have disappeared by 1900.
- Syrian Jews are generally divided into two groups: those who inhabited Syria from ancient times (according to their own traditions, from the time of King David (1000 BC)), and those who fled to the Ottoman Empire after the expulsion of the Jews from Spain (1492), at the invitation of the Ottoman sultan. There were large communities in both Aleppo and Damascus for centuries. In the early 20th century, a large percentage of Syrian Jews emigrated to the U.S., South America, and Israel. Today, there are almost no Jews left in Syria. The largest Syrian-Jewish community is located in Brooklyn, New York, and its population is estimated at 40,000.

=== Sub-Saharan Africa ===
- Beta Israel or Falashim of Ethiopia, tens of thousands migrated to Israel during Operation Moses (1984), Operation Sheba (1985) and Operation Solomon (1991). There are now over 160,000 Ethiopian Jews in Israel, making up approximately 2% of the total Israeli population.
- Descendants of the Jews of the Bilad el-Sudan (West Africa). Jews whose ancestry was derived from the communities that once existed in the Ghana, Mali, and Songhay Empire. Anusim in and around Mali who descend from Jewish migrations from North Africa, East Africa, and Spain.
- The Lemba people in Malawi which number as many as 40,000. This group claims descent from ancient Israelite tribes that migrated down to southern Africa via southern Arabia. Genetic testing has partially upheld these claims. Genetic testing suggests some males have Middle Eastern Ancestry but could not confirm Jewish ancestry.
- South African Jews make up the largest community of Jews in Africa. Dutch Sephardic Jews were among the first permanent residents of Cape Town when the city was founded by the VOC in 1652. Today, however, most of South Africa's Jews are Ashkenazi and, in particular, of Lithuanian descent.
- Communities also existed in São Tomé e Príncipe, descended from Portuguese Jewish youths expelled during the Inquisition.

=== South, East, and Central Asia ===
- Cochin Jews are Indian Jews from Malabar in south-western India, and one of the oldest extant groups in India. Most of them now reside in Israel. The community historically spoke the Judeo-Malayalam language. They also constructed synagogues across the Malabar coast.
- Bene Israel are the Jews of Mumbai or Bombay Jews, most of whom now reside in Israel. The community believes that its ancestors fled from Judea during the rule of Antiochus Epiphanes. It spoke the Judeo-Marathi language. A number of synagogues in Mumbai are still operating.
- Bukharan Jews are the descendants of Iranian and Babylonian Jews sometime considered part of the wider Mizrahi group who settled in Central Asia. They get their name from the name of the former Central Asian Emirate of Bukhara, which was once home to a large Jewish population.
- Baghdadi Jews are those Jews who came from Iraq, Iran, Afghanistan and Arab countries and settled in India in the 18th century sometime considered part of the wider Mizrahi group. Most of these Jews settled in Calcutta. They spoke the Judeo-Urdu language.
- Bnei Menashe is a community of Jews living in Manipur and Mizoram in north-eastern India, claiming descent from the dispersed Biblical Tribe of Menasseh since 1951.
- Bene Ephraim are Telugu-speaking Jews of Kottareddipalem in Andhra Pradesh, India. They claim to be the descendants of the Tribe of Ephraim, one of the Ten Lost Tribes.
- Paradesi Jews are Jews who immigrated to the Indian subcontinent during the 15th and 16th centuries following the expulsion of Jews from Spain. The word Pardesi means foreign in Indian languages.
- Desi Jews is the term used to refer to communities of Bene Israel and Cochin Jews that had been integrated into South Asian culture and society. The Desi Jewish communities are some of the oldest in world, with more than 2000 years of continuity in the Indian subcontinent.
- Chinese Jews: most prominent were the Kaifeng Jews, an ancient Jewish community in China, descended from merchants living in China from at least the era of the Tang dynasty. The community disappeared over time, although several hundred descendants have recently begun to explore and reclaim their heritage.
- Goan Jews were Sephardic Jews from Spain and Portugal who fled to Goa in India after the commencement of the Inquisition in those countries. They were the primary targets of the Goa Inquisition.
- Pakistani Jews: There was a thriving Jewish community in Pakistan particularly around the city of Karachi but also in other urban areas up north such as in Peshawer, Rawalpindi and Lahore. The origins of the Jewish community was mixed with some being Bene Israel, Bukharan Jews and Baghdadi Jews. In the late 1980s and 1990s, Jewish refugees from Iran had also came via Pakistan's Balochistan province and reached Karachi until the Iranian government closed down the operation. Most of Pakistan's Jewish community has not relocated to Israel and Pakistan's Jewish population is believed to number around 700. Also the Jews of Allahdad have residence in this area.
- Bangladeshi Jews are Jews of Bangladesh who are reported to have been Baghdadi Jews, Cochin Jews and the Bene Israel. Most of these Jews emigrated by the 1960s. Now, only a few Jewish families live in Bangladesh (practicing Crypto-Judaism) due to government policy towards Israel.
- Afghan Jews: Sometime considered part of the wider Mizrahi group Records of a Jewish population in Afghanistan go back to the 7th century. Before the arrival of Islam in Kabul, Kabul and Gandhara were trading places for Jewish merchants. The Afghan Jewish community has disappeared since the 1950s due to its gradual emigration to Israel. Since the Mughal period, the Afghans have claimed that they are the descendants of the Lost Tribes of Israel.
- Tamil Thattar Jews in Sri Lanka are Jews who have had a presence on the island nation since at least the 9th century.

=== Americas ===
Most Jewish communities in the Americas are descendants of Jews who found their way there at different times of modern history. The first Jews to settle in the Americas were of Spanish/Portuguese origin. Today, however, the great majority of recognized Jews on both the North American and South American continents are Ashkenazi, particularly among Jews in the United States. There are also Mizrahim and other diaspora groups represented (as well as mixes of any or all of these) as mentioned above. Some unique communities associated with the Americas include:

- Sephardic Bnei Anusim are the descendants of Sephardi Jewish nominal converts (conversos) to Catholicism who immigrated to the New World escaping the Spanish Inquisition in Spain and Portugal. Following the establishment of the Inquisition in the Iberian colonies, again they hid their ancestry and beliefs. Their numbers are difficult to ascertain as most are at least nominally Catholic, having been converted by force or coercion, or married into the religion. Collectively, people of Sephardic Bnei Anusim Jewish descent in Latin America is in the millions. Most would be of mixed ancestry, although a few claim some communities may have been able to maintain a degree of endogamy (marrying only other Crypto-Jews) throughout the centuries. They may or may not consider themselves Jewish, some may continue to preserve some of their Jewish heritage in secrecy, many others may not even be aware of it. The majority would not be halakhically Jewish, but small numbers of various communities have formally returned to Judaism over the past decade, legitimizing their status as Jews. See also Anusim.
- Amazonian Jews are mainly the descendants of Moroccan Jews who migrated to the Amazon basin in the 19th and early 20th centuries. While many remain in traditional Jewish communities in the region, mostly in the northern Brazilian cities of Belém and Manaus, or as part of larger Jewish communities in other Brazilian cities, others scattered in the region and mixed into the local population.
  - Iquitos Jews are mostly the mixed descendants of Moroccan Jewish traders who arrived in the Peruvian city of Iquitos during the rubber boom of the 1880s and the local mestizo or Amerindian population. In the late 20th century they began to explore their Jewish heritage, and as most of them lacked a Jewish matrilineal descent, a formal conversion would be required for them to be recognized as Jews under religious law. After years of study, with the help of Conservative rabbis from Lima, the United States, Argentina and Chile, most of them converted to Judaism and moved to Israel between 2003 and 2014.
- B'nai Moshe are converts to Judaism originally from Trujillo, Peru. They are also known as Inca Jews, a name derived from the fact that they can trace indigenous Amerindian descent, as most are mestizos (persons of both Spanish and Amerindian descent) though none with any known ancestors from other Jewish communities. Again, there is no interaction between Peru's small Ashkenazi population and the Inca Jews. At the neglect of the Ashkenazi community, the conversions were conducted under the auspices of the Chief Rabbinate of Israel. Most have made aliyah and now live in Israel, while a few hundred more of the same community are awaiting conversions.
- Veracruz Jews are a recently emergent community of Jews in Veracruz, Mexico. Whether they are gentile converts to Judaism or descendants of anusim returning to Judaism is speculative. Most claim they descend from anusim.

=== Israel ===
The state of Israel was proclaimed as being a home state for all Jews. Although the state's founders strived towards this goal, the lived experience of Jews differed greatly. At the time when the establishment of the State of Israel was proclaimed, the majority of the Jews who lived in both the state and the region were Ashkenazi. However, by the 1990s, the majority of Israeli Jews were Mizrahi. As of 2005, 61% of Israeli Jews are of Mizrahi ancestry.

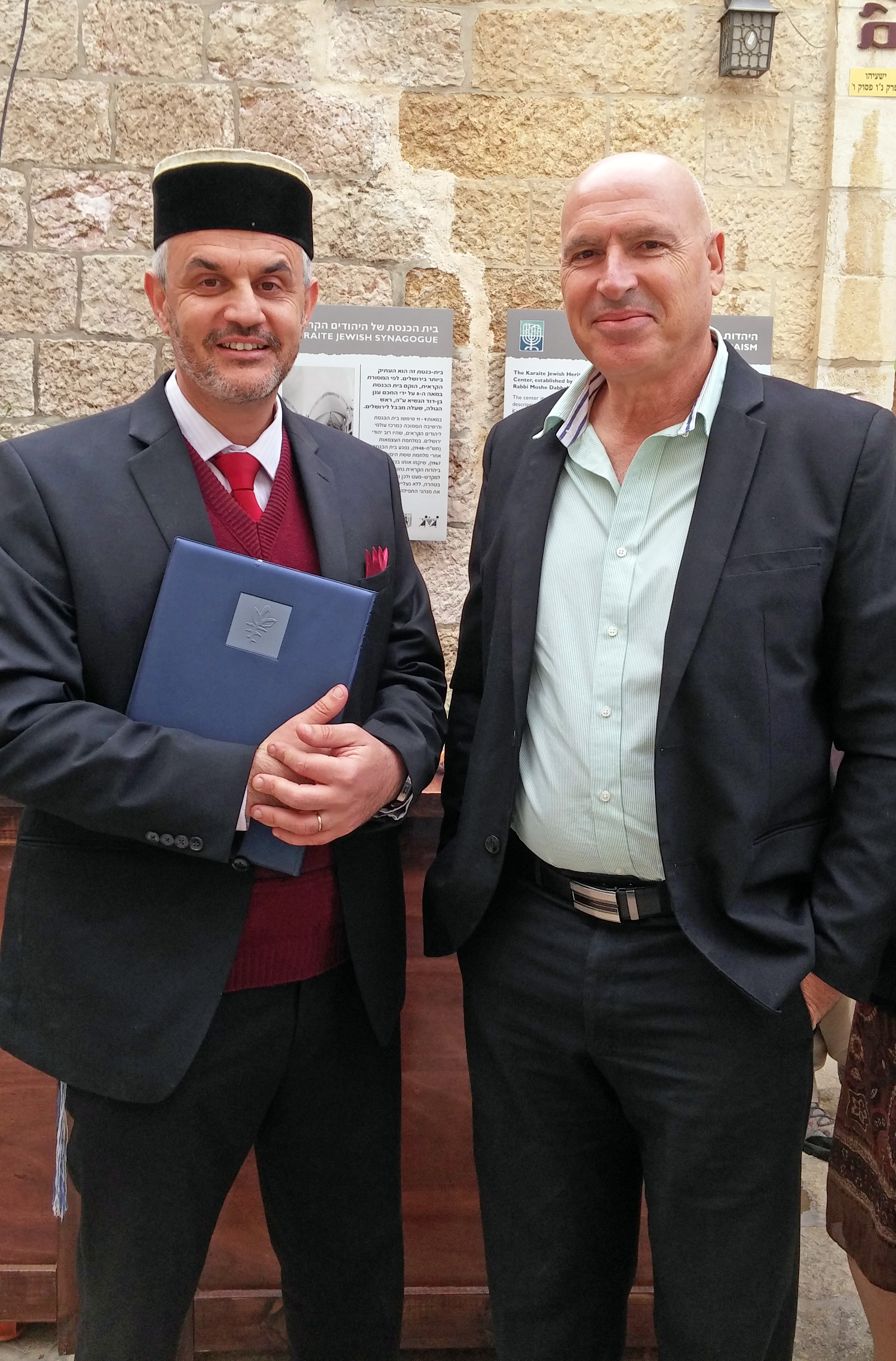
Chief Karaite rabbi, Moshe Fairouz (left) and vice chairman, Eli Eltahan. Jerusalem, Israel.

Following the establishment of the state, a flood of Jewish migrants and refugees entered Israel from the Arab world in particular and the Muslim world in general. Most of them were Sephardim and Mizrahim, and they included Jews from the Maghreb, Yemenite Jews, Bukharan Jews, Persian Jews, Iraqi Jews, Kurdish Jews, as well as smaller communities, principally those from Libya, Egypt and Turkey. Many immigrants from these communities coming to Israel were met with harsh living conditions, as the fledgling state did not yet have sufficient financial resources to house the influx of its residents. Thus, many immigrants were temporarily housed in tents until spaces of more adequate living means were developed. An additional challenge for non-Ashkenazi Jews was that of a spoken language. Yiddish was the spoken language within Jewish communities in the eastern portion of the European continent, but groups outside of this—who constituted a minority of the population of Israel—spoke other languages. For example, some Sephardic communities spoke Ladino and many Mizrahi Jews spoke Arabic. Hebrew, which was then a language mostly reserved for religious purposes, was the language that Jewish communities had in common. Hebrew was already spoken conversationally among tradespeople living in the region of Palestine, and its full revival as a spoken language that could be used by all residents of Israel was spearheaded by Eliezer Ben-Yehuda.

More recently, other communities have also arrived, including Ethiopian Jews and Indian Jews. Because of the relative homogeneity of Ashkenazi Jewry, especially in comparison to the diversity of the many smaller Jewish communities, over time in Israel, all Jews from Europe came to be called "Ashkenazi" in Israel (even those Jews from Europe who did not have any connection to Germany) while Jews from Africa and Asia have come to be called "Sephardi" (even those Jews from Africa and Asia who did not have any connection to Spain). One reason for this categorization is due to many African and Asian Jewish communities performing the Sephardic prayer ritual, and also abiding by the rulings of the Sephardic rabbinic authorities. As a result, they consider themselves Sephardim in the broader sense of the term "Jews of the Spanish rite" because they do not consider themselves Sephardim in the narrower sense of Spanish Jews. Similarly, the term "Ashkenazim" now has the broader sense of the term "Jews of the German rite".

Aspects of these differing experiences among Ashkenazi, Sephardic, and Mizrahi Jewry still linger a half-century later, according to studies which were conducted by the Adva Center, a think tank on social equality, and by other Israeli academic research Every Israeli prime minister has been Ashkenazi, although Sephardim and Mizrahim have attained the presidency, generally considered a ceremonial position, and other high positions. The student bodies of Israel's universities remain overwhelmingly European in origin, despite the fact that roughly half the country's population is non-European. Scattered over areas on the border of the Negev Desert and the Galilee, far from Israel's major cities, most of these towns never had the critical mass or ingredients to succeed as places to live, and reports have emerged that document their residents suffering from high unemployment and inadequate schools. Prof. Smadar Lavie, Mizrahi U.S.-Israeli anthropologist, has documented and analyzed the discriminatory treatment Mizrahi single mothers endure from the Ashkenazi-majority Israeli government, suggesting that Israeli bureaucracy is based on a theological notion that inserts the categories of religion, gender, and race into the foundation of citizenship. Lavie connects intra-Jewish racial and gendered dynamics to the 2014 Gaza War in her widely reviewed book, Wrapped in the Flag of Israel: Mizrahi Single Mothers and Bureaucratic Torture, and analyzes the racial and gender justice protest movements in the State of Israel from the 2003 Single Mothers' March to the 2014 New Black Panthers.

Intermarriage between members of all of these regathered Jewish ethnic groups was initially uncommon, partially as a result of the distances which separated each group's settlement in Israel, and partially because of cultural and/or racial biases. In recent generations, however, the barriers were lowered by the state-sponsored assimilation of all of the Jewish ethnic groups into a common Sabra (native-born Israeli) identity, a policy which facilitated extensive mixed-marriages.

== See also ==
- Gerim (Jewish converts)
- Genetic studies of Jews
- History of the Jews and Judaism in the Land of Israel
- Jewish diaspora
- Racism in Jewish communities
- Who is a Jew?
