= Bacher =

Bacher is a surname. Notable people with the surname include:

- Adam Bacher (born 1973), South African cricketer
- Ali Bacher (born 1942), South African cricketer and cricket official
- Dominik Bacher (born 2002), German footballer
- Edvard Bacher (1875–1961), Finnish Olympic sports shooter
- Enrico Bacher (1940–2021), Italian ice hockey player who competed at the 1964 Winter Olympics
- Gertrud Bacher (born 1971), Italian heptathlete
- Ingrid Bachér (born 1930), pen name for Ingrid Erben, German writer
- Julius Bacher (1810–1889), German playwright and novelist
- Lutz Bacher (1943–2019), American artist
- Mario Bacher (1941–2014), Italian ski mountaineer and cross-country skier
- Michael Bacher (born 1988) Italian footballer
- Robert Bacher (1905–2004), American nuclear physicist
- Sandra Bacher, wrestling champion and Olympic judo competitor
- Simon Bacher (1823–1891), Hungarian poet
- Tom Bacher, Danish badminton player
- Wilhelm Bacher (1850–1913), Hungarian scholar, Orientalist, and linguist
