= Zeved habat =

Jewish naming ceremony for newborn girls

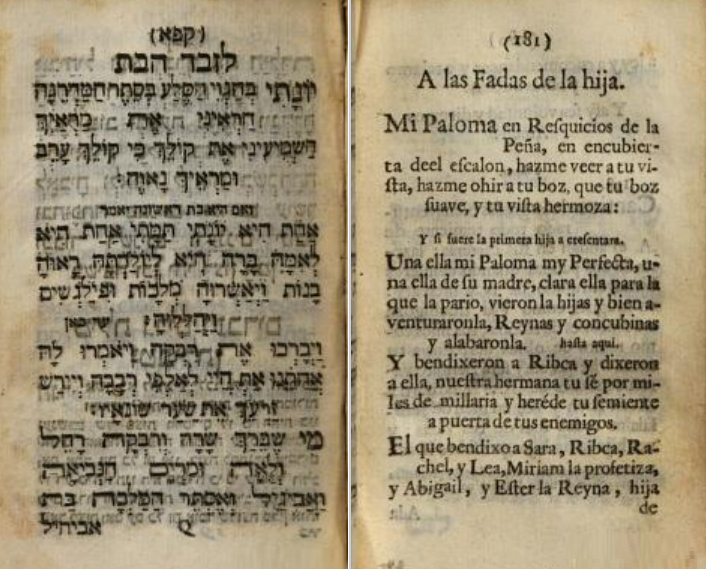
Zeved Habat / Fadas Ceremony (1687)

Zeved habat (Hebrew: זֶבֶד הַבָּת - Gift of the Daughter) or Simchat Bat (Hebrew: שמחת בת - Celebration of the Daughter) is the Jewish naming ceremony for newborn girls. The details of the celebration varies somewhat by Jewish community and will typically feature the recitation of specific biblical verses and a prayer to announce the name of the newborn child.

The ceremony is also known by other names including Fadas, Brit Bat (Hebrew: ברית בת - "Covenant of the Daughter") or Brit Kedusha (Hebrew: ברית קדושה - "Covenant of Holiness"). A medieval naming ceremony for girls, according to the custom of some medieval Ashkenazi communities, was known as a Hollekreisch (Yiddish: חול־קרייש), or Shabbat Hayoledet ("Sabbath of the Birth Mother").

== Background ==
The practice of Zeved Habat is recorded as a custom of Sephardi and Mizrahi Jews in various communities including Moroccan Jews, Syrian Jews, the Sephardic community in England and of Cochin Jews of India. The ceremony is listed in a book of prayers published in 1687 associated with the Portuguese Jews of Amsterdam.

In the mid-20th century, following the development of the Havurah movement and the rise of Jewish feminism, American Jews took a renewed interest in both new and traditional ceremonies for welcoming baby girls. For American Jews who did not previously maintain the tradition of a naming ceremony for newborn girls, one strategy has been to recover older Jewish traditions to meet the present ritual needs of the community. It is likely that the first such ceremony to be formulated for Jews outside of the Sephardi and Mizrahi communities was a ceremony developed by rabbis in Reconstructionist Judaism in the 1970s. However, in the 1970s and 1980s, other American Jews from various denominations, including individual Orthodox families, also formulated various ceremonies often referred to as a Simchat Bat. At the same time, some Orthodox scholars, including Moshe Meiselman and Judith Bleich, raised opposition to new ceremonies, while Rabbi Shlomo Riskin at the Lincoln Square Synagogue supported the incorporation of the ceremony as Orthodox custom. In the case of Anglo-speaking Orthodox communities, a modified version of the Zeved Habat ceremony has been added to established Orthodox prayerbooks (alongside the standard Ashkenazi mi sheberach) since the early 2000s with the support of UK Chief Rabbi Jonathan Sacks.

== The traditional ceremony ==
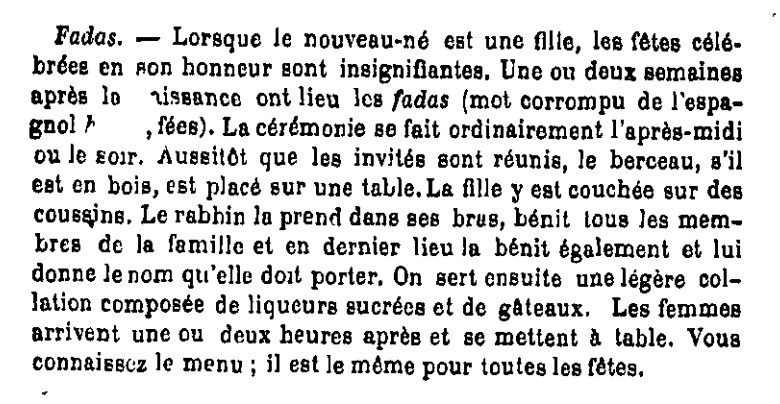
French description of the Fadas ceremony (1888)

In Jewish legal literature, the Zeved Habat event is cited as either taking place in the synagogue during the Torah reading of the Shabbat service, when the father receives an aliya, or the ceremony may take place at the home in the course of a festive meal. Some Jewish communities have the custom of waiting until the mother has recovered and can enter the synagogue for the ceremony to take place. The event is also treated as an appropriate occasion for the mother of the newborn to recite the traditional blessing of thanksgiving, known as Hagomel. Some Jews have the custom to hold the Zeved Habat ceremony on the first Shabbat from the birth. The Hebrew word zeved is understood to be a somewhat rare word and appears just once in the Pentateuch in Genesis 30:20 where Leah offers thanks to God for the birth of Zebulon. The Hebrew word used in the verse may mean "gift" or "dwelling".

The custom is for a verse from Song of Songs 2:14 to be recited. And if the newborn is also the firstborn child, the custom is for an added verse of Song of Songs 6:9 to be recited. Following this recitation, a Mi sheberakh blessing is recited (see text below) which includes the namegiving prayer. Some communities maintain the custom that the rabbi holds the newborn while reciting the verse(s) from Song of Songs.

=== The Mi sheberakh prayer ===
In this ceremony, a Mi sheberakh prayer (below) is used to announce the name of the child. The wording to the prayer varies somewhat by Jewish community. For some, the prayer begins with Mi sheberakh imoteinu hakedoshot ("The one Who blesses our Holy Mothers"). Additionally, the prayer ends with added verses relating to the matriarch Rebekah. Other versions include the phrase v'kol hakehilot hakedushot v'hatehorot ("and all the holy and pure congregations") following the mention of the prophetesses. Additionally, some editions specify that the child be named with mention of her mother's name ([name of the newborn] bat [name of the mother]).

In some versions, the words imoteinu ("our mothers") and beYisrael ("in Israel") are omitted. In other versions, such as those from the Moroccan Jewish community, they are included.

מִי שֶׁבֵּרַךְ אִמּוֹתֵינוּ שָׂרָה וְרִבְקָה. רָחֵל וְלֵאָה. וּמִרְיָם הַנְּבִיאָה וַאֲבִיגַיִל. וְאֶסְתֵּר הַמַּלְכָּה בַּת אֲבִיחַיִל. הוּא יְבָרֵךְ אֶת הַיַּלְדָּה הַנְּעִימָה הַזּאת. וְיִקָּרֵא שְׁמָהּ בְּיִשְׂרָאֵל פלונית. בְּמַזַּל טוֹב וּבְשַׁעַת בְּרָכָה. וִיגַדְּלֶהָ בִּבְרִיאוּת שָׁלוֹם וּמְנוּחָה. וִיזַכֶּה לְאָבִיהָ וּלְאִמָּהּ לִרְאוֹת בְּשִׂמְחָתָהּ וּבְחֻפָּתָהּ. בְּבָנִים זְכָרִים. עשֶׁר וְכָבוֹד. דְּשֵׁנִים וְרַעֲנַנִּים יְנוּבוּן בְּשֵׂיבָה. וְכֵן יְהִי רָצוֹן וְנאמַר אָמֵן׃

The one Who blessed our mothers, Sarah and Rivkah, Rachel and Leah, and the prophet Miriam and Abigayil and Queen Esther, daughter of Abichayil — may He bless this beloved girl and let her name in Israel be ... [name] with good luck and in a blessed hour; and may she grow up with good health, peace and tranquility; and may her father and her mother merit to see her joy and her wedding, and male children, riches and honour; and may they be vigorous and fresh, fruitful into old age; and so may this be the will, and let it be said, Amen!

=== Related customs ===
In the Sephardi community, the Zeved habat is usually celebrated within the first month of the birth. It is held privately in the synagogue or at a party at home. It is often led by the ḥakhám (rabbinic sage) or hazzan (cantor).

One custom is for the following to be recited:

הָרַחֲמָן הוּא יְבָרֵךְ אֶת אֲבִי הַיַּלְדָה וְאִמָּהּ, וְיִזְכּוּ לְגַדְּלָהּ וּלְחַנְּכָהּ וּלְחַכְּמָהּ, לְכָבוֹד וּלְתִפְאֶרֶת לְכָל עַמָּהּ וִיהִי אֲדֹנָ־י אֱ־לֹהֶיהַָ עִמָּהּ. הָרַחֲמָן הוּא יְבָרֵךְ אֶת הַרַכָּה וְהַעֲדִינָה, וְיִהְיוּ יָדֵֶיהָ וְלִבָּהּ לָאֵ־ל אֱמוּנָה, וְתִזְכֶּה לִרְאוֹת פְּנֵי הַשְּׁכִינָה, בְּשׁוּבְךָ לְצִיּוֹן בְּרִנָּה. הָרַחֲמָן הוּא יְבָרֵךְ אֶת הַקְּהִלָּה אֲשֶׁר שָׂשׂוּ לַעֲשׂוֹת צְדָקָה בְגִילָה, וִישַׁלֵּם פָּעֳלָם וּמַשְׂכֻּרְתָּם כְּפוּלָה, וְיִתְּנֵם לְמַעְלָה לְמָעְלָה. הָרַחֲמָן הוּא יִגְאָלֵנוּ גְאֻלַּת עוֹלָמִים, בִּזְכוּת שׁוֹמְרֵי בְרִיתוֹ הוֹלְכֵי תָמִים, וִיְבַשֵּׂר בְּשׂוֹרוֹת טוֹבוֹת וְנִחוּמִים, לְעַם אֶחָד מְפֻזָּר וּמְפֹרָד בֵּין הָעַמִּים. הָרַחֲמָן אֲשֶׁר כּוֹנֵן צַעֲדֵנוּ עַד הֲלוֹם, יְקַדֵשׁ בָּנוּ אֶת שְׁמוֹ אֲשֶׁר בְּעֵילוֹם, וְיַאֵר אֲלֵינוּ כַּשֶּׁמֶשׁ וְיָהֲלוֹם, בְּרִיתוֹ תִהְיֶה אִתָּנוּ, הַחַיִּים וְהַשָּׁלוֹם.

One custom is for the father of the newborn to recite a Hebrew poem which begins with Ayuma marayich hareini.

אֲיֻמָּה מַרְאַיִךְ הַרְאִינִי וְנֹעַם קוֹלֵךְ הַשְׁמִיעִינִי בְּעֵינַיִךְ לִבַּבְתִּינִי פִּתְחִי לִי אֲחוֹתִי כַלָּה אֲיֻמָּה רַעְיָתִי יָפָתִי אַחַת הִיא יוֹנָתִי תַמָּתִי בּוֹאִי נָא אֶל חֶדֶר הוֹרָתִי אִתִּי מִלְּבָנוֹן כַּלָּה אֲיֻמָּה דִמִּיתִיךְ לְתָמָר חִכֵּךְ כְּיֵין טוֹב הַמְשֻׁמָּר טַעְמוֹ וְרֵיחוֹ לֹא נָמַר גַּן נָעוּל אֲחוֹתִי כַלָּה אֲיֻמָּה כַּחַמָּה בָרָה רָחוֹק מִפְּנִינִים מִכְרָהּ חוּשִׁי נָא קוּמִי בִּמְהֵרָה נָשִׂישׂ כִּמְשׂוֹשׂ חָתָן עַל כַּלָּה אֲיֻמָּה יָפוּ פְעָמַיִךְ מַה טּוֹבוּ מִיַּיִן דּוֹדַיִךְ כִּשְׁנֵי עֳפָרִים שָׁדַיִךְ צוּף דְּבַשׁ שִׂפְתוֹתַיִךְ כַּלָּה

A common element of the ceremony is the birth mother's thanksgiving for following the birth. The blesing recited is known as Birkat HaGomel ("Blessing of Deliverance").

The mother recites:

בָּרוּךְ אַתָּה ה׳ אֱלֹהֵינוּ מֶלֶךְ הָעוֹלָם הַגּוֹמֵל לְחַיָּבִים טוֹבוֹת שֶׁגְּמָלַנִי כָּל טוֹב

Blessed are You, Lord our God, ruler of the world, who rewards the undeserving with goodness, and who has rewarded me with goodness.

To which the congregation responds:

מִי שֶׁגְּמָלֵךְ כֹּל טוֹב הוּא יִגְמָלֵךְ כֹּל טוֹב סֶלָה

May he who rewarded you with all goodness reward you with all goodness for ever.

Others include a recitation of Psalm 128, and the Priestly Blessing (Birkat kohanim).

==== Ashkenazi customs ====
The original Ashkenazi practice does not include a Zeved Habat ceremony and instead involves a minor prayer for name giving. However, in the 20th Century, the Zeved Habat ceremony, often renamed as a Simchat Bat ceremony has become accepted in various Ashkenazi communities.

Many Ashkenazi communities use a prayer for the health of a mother and newborn, recited by someone called up to read from the Torah scroll, as an opportunity to name a baby girl. According to the Chabad Hasidic custom, it is preferable for the newborn girl to be named at the earliest possible Torah reading in the synagogue (whether on Monday, Thursday, Shabbat or other day which include a public Torah reading), however, other customs are also cited such as those who wait until the Shabbat when a greater celebration may occur and the Sephardi custom of Zeved Habat. According to Rabbi Shlomo Ganzfried (1804-1886), in terms of the aliyah for the father of a newborn girl, preference is given to the one whose wife (the mother of the newborn) comes to the synagogue.

The Ashkenz mi sheberach includes the following:

מי שברך אבותינו אברהם יצחק ויעקב, הוא יברך את האשה היולדת ( ) בת ( ) ואת בתה הנולדה לה במזל טוב, ויקרא שמה בישראל ( ) בת ( ) בעבור שבעלה ואביה יתן לצדקה. בשכר זה יגדלה לתורה לחפה ולמעשים טובים. ונאמר: אמן.
He Who blessed our forefathers Abraham, Isaac, and Jacob - may He bless the woman who has given birth (new mother's Hebrew name) daughter of (her father's Hebrew name) with her daughter who has been born to her at an auspicious time, and may her name be called in Israel (baby's Hebrew name) daughter of (baby's father's Hebrew name), for her husband, the infant's father, will contribute to charity on their behalf. In reward for this, may they raise her to Torah, marriage and good deeds. Now let us respond: amen.

The contemporary Simchat Bat ceremony has become an accepted custom among modern-Orthodox Jews of Ashkenazi background as an adaptation of the Zeved Habat ritual. The uniqueness of the ceremony is that it may be presented as non-traditional and female-focused, in which women play a role alongside men. One possibility for this acceptance of the Simchat Bat in modern Orthodox Judaism is that it is a ceremony with no major Jewish legalistic (halakhic) implications and which does not intrude upon male ritual space. In the modern Orthodox ceremony, a number of additional elements are added to the traditional Zeved Habat ceremony including the public sharing of a Torah lesson (dvar Torah) often by the parent or a friend, readings about female biblical figures, and an explanation of the name chosen for the newborn. The child may also be given both an ‘English’ and a ‘Jewish’ name (either a Hebrew or Yiddish name). Additionally, in the Simchat Bat ceremony, there is greater opportunity for women (such as the birth mother) to participate in the ceremony ritual.

A Simchat Bat celebration may consist of a communal welcoming, a naming done over a cup of wine with the quotation of appropriate Biblical verses, and traditional blessings. In the Ashkenazi community, name ceremonies for newborn girls were not widespread and often limited to the father announcing the baby's name in the synagogue on the Shabbat, Monday, Thursday or other occasion when the Torah would be read following the birth. Sometimes a kiddush will be held at the synagogue for family and friends. Although ceremonies can be found in Ashkenazic sources. Rabbi Yacov Emden includes a text in his famous prayer book.

==== Hollekreisch ceremony ====
In medieval times, girls were named during shavua habat (lit. 'week of the daughter'). In early German Jewish communities, a baby naming ceremony was developed for both girls and boys called a Hollekreisch (possibly meaning 'secular shout', or relating to the mythical Frau Holle), in which the infant's crib was raised and the newborn received their secular names. The date of the ritual varied, either on the first Shabbat following the birth when the mother of the newborn could visit the synagogue (known as Shabbat Hayoledet), or the fourth Shabbat from the date of the birth. The ritual took place after Shabbat lunch. The babies were dressed up, and boys were draped in a tallit. The book of Vayikra (Leviticus) was placed in the crib. The crib would then be lifted up and the following recited in German: "Hollekreisch! How shall the baby be called? So-and-so So-and-so So-and-so (i.e. his or her name three times)." Nuts, sweets and fruits were then distributed to the guests. The custom applied to both boys (who had already received their Hebrew names at their brit mila) and girls. This ceremony was widely observed in Jewish circles in Germany as early as the 14th century. In the 17th century this custom was observed in naming boys and girls only in South Germany, while in Austria, Bohemia, Moravia and Poland it was not used for boys, and only rarely for girls.

== New ceremonies ==
- Conservative Judaism — The rabbi's manual of Conservative Judaism presents a ceremony which includes readings and blessings as well as optional features which parents may choose to perform including lighting of candles, touching a Torah handle, and enfolding in a prayer shawl (tallit). In the candle ceremony, the newborn is carried between rows of guests who hold candles; alternatively, six candles may be lit, symbolizing the six days of creation. In the Torah ceremony, a Torah scroll is taken out of the ark and the baby's hands are placed on the Torah handle. In the tallit ceremony, honorees fold each corner of a tallit over or around the newborn. Other customs include the addition of a special greeting at the start of the ceremony.
- Reconstructionist Judaism — The prayerbook of Reconstructionist Judaism includes both Hebrew prayers of blessing and an English blessing regarding Torah study. The Reconstructionist Rabbi's Manual, however, presents an additional ceremony known as Berit Rihitzah (‘‘Covenant of Washing’’) for girls, along with the welcoming and naming ceremony. The Berit Rihitzah incorporates the washing of the baby's feet in water with readings and blessings related to the symbol of water. The ceremony blessing states that God has ‘‘commanded us to bring her into the covenant of the people of Israel.’’ An earlier version of the Reconstructionist ceremony was known as Brit B’not Yisrael ("Covenant of the Daughter of Israel") and was formulated by Rabbi Sandy Eisenberg Sasso and her husband Rabbi Dennis Sasso in the early 1970s. The ceremony was to take place on Shabbat at the home of the parents of the newborn and includes the following blessing: ‘‘Praised are You, Eternal God, Ruler of the Universe, who sanctified us with Your commandments and commanded us to bring our daughter into the covenant of the people of Israel."

== See also ==
- Bar and bat mitzvah
- Brit milah
- Girls Day (Judaism)
- Hollekreisch
