= List of synagogues in Maharashtra =

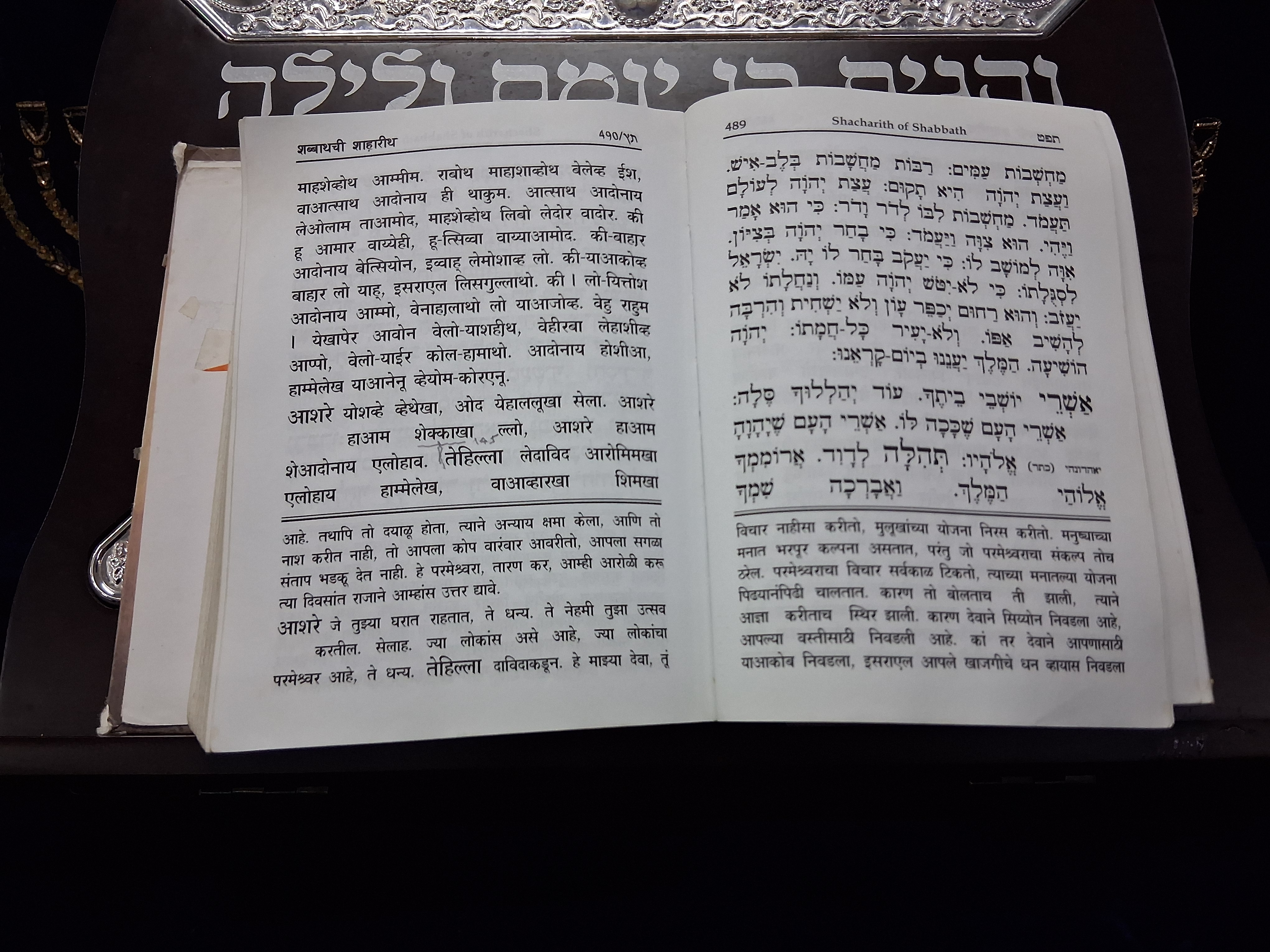
Jewish prayer book with Marathi translation

This is a list of synagogues in Maharashtra.

Jews started settling in Mumbai (then Bombay) and other coastal towns of Maharashtra during the 18th century, due to its economic opportunities. The Jewish community of Bombay consisted of the remnants of three distinct communities: the Bene Israeli Jews of Konkan, the Baghdadi Jews of Iraq, and the Cochin Jews of Malabar.

== List of active synagogues ==
There are a total of ten active synagogues in Maharashtra. Six of these are located in downtown Mumbai. There are three on the outskirts of Mumbai, including one each in Thane, Alibaug and Panvel. Pune also houses one active synagogue.

| Name | Location | Image | Brief description |
|---|---|---|---|
| Knesset Eliyahoo Synagogue | Fort Area, Mumbai | | Located at the heart of Mumbai, Keneseth Eliyahoo Synagogue with its bright blue and white exterior is popularly known as the blus synagogue. It was constructed in 1884 and is a Baghdadi Jew Synagogue. The interiors are well laid out with light filtering through the stained glass windows. Brass chandeliers and ornamentation adds to the beauty of the interiors. |
| Shaar Harahamim Synagogue | Masjid Bandar, Mumbai | | Shaar Harahamim literally means "Gateway of Mercy". Built in 1796 it is the oldest synagogue in Mumbai. It is also known as the Old Synagogue. It belongs to the Bene Israel group. It is located in a very congested area near the Masjid railway station. |
| Share Rason Synagogue | Israel Moholla, Mumbai | | Share Rason literally meaning the "Gateway of Desire" is the second oldest Synagogue of Mumbai and belongs to the Bene Israel community. This synagogue was created as a conflict in the management of the Shaar Harhamim Synagogue. The Share Rason came up in the nearby area and came to be known as the "New Synagogue". The older Shaar Harhamim Synagogue came to be known as "Old Synagogue". |
| Magen David Synagogue | Byculla, Mumbai | | A Baghdadi Synagogue built by David Sassoon in 1861. Following the Victorian style of architecture the synagogue has a high steeple fitted with a clock. The interior of the synagogue is a double-height sanctuary with women's gallery wrapping around three sides of the upper floor. In the 2010s the exterior and interior of the Magen David Synagogue have been painted blue and white. |
| Magen Hasidim Synagogue | Byculla, Mumbai | | Magen Hasidin, literally meaning the Shield of the Pious, is the largest Bene Israel synagogue in Mumbai. The original synagogue started in 1904 but was shifted to the larger present location in 1931. The interiors are more lively with a decorative wooden central platform. The women's gallery is on the first floor balcony. Decorative chandeliers lit up the interior with the large windows allowing the natural light to filter in. |
| Tephereth Israel Synagogue | Jacob Circle, Mumbai | | Tephereth Israel or Tifereth Israel literally means Glory of Israel. It is the third Bene Israel Synagogue in Mumbai. It started in 1896 and moved to the present location in 1924. The building had undergone several extensions and modifications ever since. The ladies gallery lies on the northern side of the synagogue. Hanging brass and glass lanterns, ceiling fans, decorative metal window grilles and wall scones are part of the grand interior. |
| Shaar Hashamaim Synagogue | Thane, Mumbai | | Shaar Hashamaim, literally meaning Gateway of Heaven, is an active synagogue in the Thane region of Mumbai. It dates back to 1879 and belongs to the Bene Israel Jews. |
| Beth El Synagogue | Panvel, Mumbai | | Beth El. literally meaning the House of God, is an active synagogue in the Panvel area. It is located just north of the Raigad District and the synagogue can be considered as the oldest of the Raigad Synagogues. It dates back to 1849 and belongs to the Bene Israel Jews. |
| Magen Aboth Synagogue | Alibaug, Maharashtra | | Magen Aboth, literally meaning Defender of the Brothers, in Alibaug is the only active synagogue in Raigad District. The synagogue dates back to 1910 and belongs to the Bene Israel Jews. It is a baroque style pink building with white borders. |
| Ohel David Synagogue | Pune | | Ohel David (literally meaning The Tent of David) is a prominent landmark of Pune. It is known as Lal Deval or Lal Deul (both mean red temple). It dates back to 1867 and was funded by David Sassoon and belongs to the Baghdadi Jews. The synagogue follows a distinct English Gothic style architecture. The complex houses the mausoleum of David Sassoon |

== Jewish prayer halls ==
Apart from the synagogues Mumbai also houses two active Jewish prayer halls

- Kurla Prayer Hall, Kurla, Mumbai
- Etz Haeem Prayer Hall, Balu Changu Patil Marg, Mumbai

== List of closed synagogues ==
There are approximately ten closed synagogues in Maharastra. Eight of these are located in Raigad District, one each in Mumbai and Pune.

- Ambepur Synagogue, Raigad District
- Beth El Ashtami Synagogue, Ashtami Village, Raigad District
- Beth El Rewdanda Synagogue, Rewdanda Village, Raigad District
- Beth Ha-Elohim Synagogue, Raigad District
- Hessed El Synagogue, Poyand, Raigad District
- Keneseth Israel Synagogue, Talley Ghosaley, Raigad District
- Orle Israel Synagogue, Nandgoan Mura, Raigad District
- Shaar Hathephilah Synagogue, Mhasla, Raigad District
- Rodef Shalom Synagogue, Byculla, Mumbai

== See also ==
- History of the Jews in India
- List of synagogues in India
