= Michel Abitbol =

Moroccan-Israeli historian

- מיכאל אביטבול
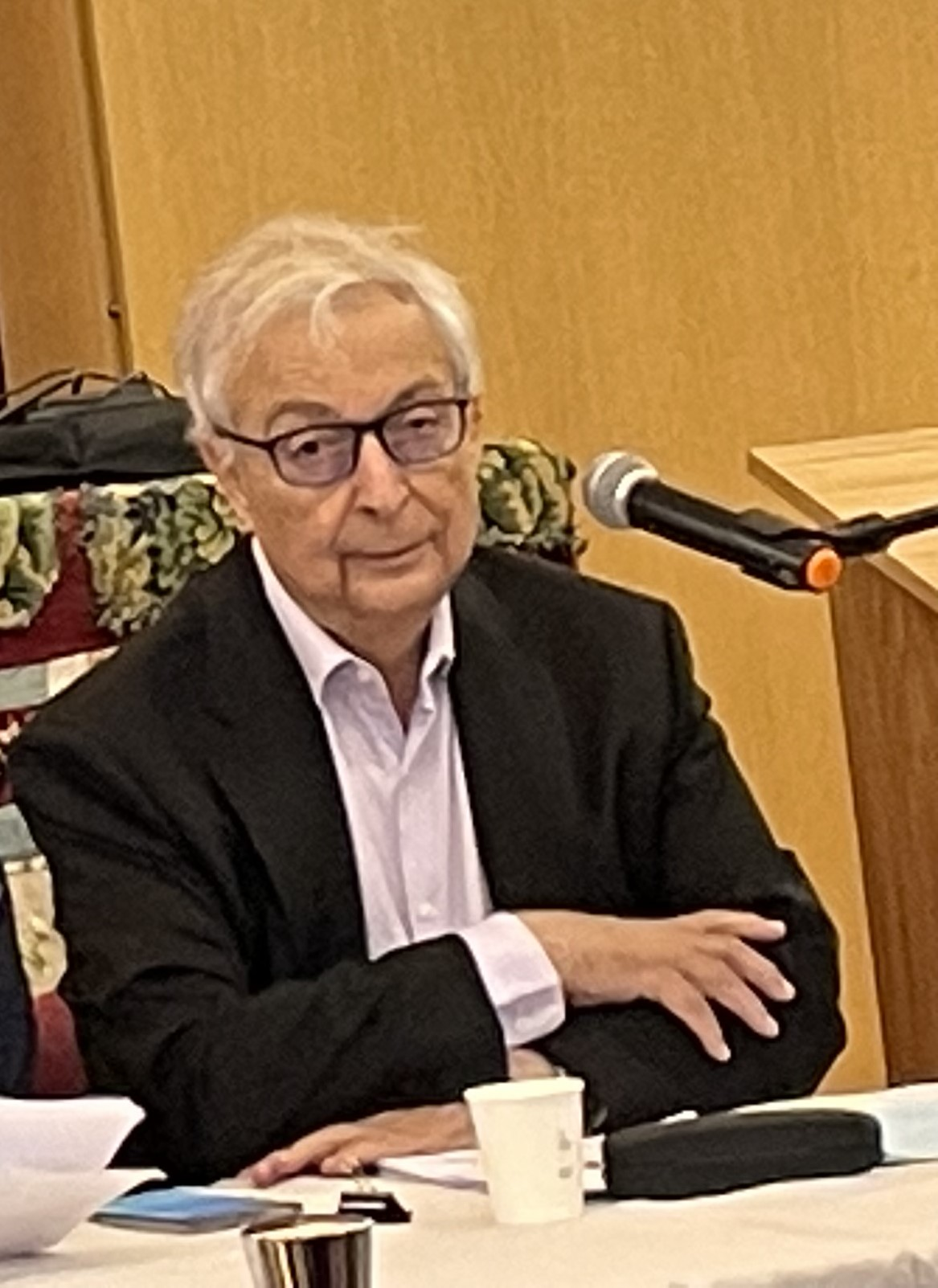
- Born: April 14, 1943 (age 83); Casablanca, Morocco
- Known for: Expert on the history of Morocco and the history of the Jews of North Africa
- Scientific career
- Fields: History
- Workplaces: Hebrew University of Jerusalem

Michel Abitbol (Hebrew: מיכאל אביטבול; born 14 April 1943 in Casablanca, Morocco) is a Moroccan-Israeli historian.

He is considered an expert on the history of Morocco and the history the Jews of North Africa. In the 80s, he gave courses at Université Paris VIII and Yale University. He is currently professor and chair of the Department of African Studies at the Hebrew University of Jerusalem. He is the scientific director of the Center for Research on Moroccan Jewry, founded in Jerusalem in 1994.

He writes his books and monographs in French.

From 1978 until 1981 and from 1987 until 1994 he was the director of the Ben-Zvi Institute in Jerusalem.

== Books ==
- Témoins et Acteurs – Les Cor cos et l'histoire du Maroc contemporain, Ben-Zvi Institute, Jerusalem, (1978)
- Tombouctou et les Arma, Paris, Maisonneuve et Larose, (1979).
- Tombouctou au milieu du XVIIIème siècle, Union Académique Internationale, Fontes Historiae Africanae, series Arabica VII, Paris, Maisonneuve et Larose, (1982), XII+85+18pp.
- Les Juifs d'Afrique du Nord sous Vichy, Paris, Maisonneuve et Larose, (1983), 220pp. Translated to Hebrew (Ben Zvi Institute, 1985) and to English at Wayne State University Press (1989)
- Les Deux Terres Promises – Les Juifs de France et le Sionisme (1897–1945), Paris, Olivier Orban, (1989)
- De Crémieux à Pétain – Antisémitisme et Colonialisme en Algérie [in Hebrew], Jerusalem, Shazar Center, (1993)
- Tujjar al-Sultan – Une élite économique judéo-marocaine au XIXème siècle, Jerusalem, Ben Zvi Institute, (1994)
- Tujjar al-Sultan – Les commerçants du Roi, Paris, Maisonneuve et Larose, (1998)
- Le passé d'une discorde – Juifs et Arabes du VIIème siècle à nos jours, Paris, Editions Perrin, (1999)
- Reedition: Le passé d'une discorde – Juifs et Arabes depuis le VIIème siècle, Paris, Tempus, (2003)
- Les Amnésiques – Juifs et Arabes depuis 1967 – Perrin (2005)
- Histore du Maroc – Perrin (2009)
- Histoire des Juifs de la Genèse à nos jours, collection Pour l'histoire, Paris, Perrin (2013)
- Histoire d'Israël, Perrin, 2018, 868 p.
