= Asi Abutbul =

Israeli mobster (born 1975)

- אסי אבוטבול
- Born: January 1, 1975
- Status: Incarcerated
- Criminal charges: Selling weapons, murder
- Penalty: 13 years in prison

Asi Abutbul (Hebrew: אסי אבוטבול; born 1975) is an Israeli mobster. In May 2006 Abutbul was arrested by Israeli Police, along with another mobster, Eli Naim, on suspicion of selling weapons to Naim with criminal intent.

BMW importer Kamoor was caught giving Abutbul 2 cars free of charge. In 2008, Abutbul was sentenced to 18 months in prison for selling weapons to gangs in Jerusalem and Netanya. On June 21, 2009, Abutbul and 19 of his men were sent to jail. Abutbul was sentenced to 13 years in prison.

On July 31, 2011, Michael Abutbul's brother, François Abutbul, was shot and killed. According to media reports in Israel, François was the head of the same criminal organization that Michael led.

On August 29, 2017, Michael Abutbul was charged with the 1999 murder of Arthur Rosen. He was also charged with conspiring to murder his attorney Yoram Hakham in 2008.
