= Hollekreisch =

Birth ritual practiced by Ashkenazi Jews

Hollekreisch, sometimes referred to as “Hoolegrasch” or “Hallekreisch”, is a birth ritual practiced by Ashkenazi Jews. It pertains to the naming of sons and daughters and is a ceremony practiced by children. The name given in this ceremony is not the sacred Hebrew name, but the name used in every-day life. The ceremony first appeared in the Middle Ages in the regions of Alsace, Southern Germany and Switzerland and is still practiced in certain parts of Switzerland and Alsace, despite the initial belief that it had disappeared.

== Etymology ==
The origins of the term “Hollekreisch” are somewhat unclear. It is possible that this is a reference to the Hebrew word khol secular, perhaps originating from “khol kreisch”, which translates to “secular cry”. This would make sense in that the ceremony is centred around the giving of the secular name, as opposed to the sacred Hebrew name (given to a boy during his Brit Milah).

Another theory is that the ceremony could be linked to local (non-Jewish) German customs. Pagan German stories often reference a mythical woman or goddess called Frau Holle, who was thought to kidnap unbaptised babies. Local German rituals to protect children involved lifting them up three times and calling “Holle, Holle, Holle.” In this ceremony, the child would be given a name. This has clear parallels to the Hollekreisch, in which the children performing the ceremony would call “Hollekreisch, wie soll das Kind heissen?” (Hollekreisch, what should the child be named?)- followed by three repetitions of the name the child was to be given.

== History of the custom ==
An 11th century compendium of Jewish lithurgy and ritals (the Machzor Vitry) mentions a ceremony in which people gathered around a newborn boy’s cradle and recited biblical verses, while symbolic objects were placed in the cradle or in the baby’s hand.

One of the first mentions of the Hollekreisch as a name-giving ceremony was in the 16th century by Rabbi Israel ben Shalom Shakhna of Lublin (ca. 1510-1558). He describes children gathering to lift up the baby and call out his (*he in the original account) secular name, and adds “and all this is called Hallekreisch.”

Juspa Schammes (1604-1678), who was documenting the rituals and customs of the Jewish community of Worms wrote a detailed account of the Hollekreisch, the details of which appeared to differ according to the child’s gender. For a baby boy, young boys would come to the house, and the older boys would read a series of verses from the Pentateuch as well as important verses such as the Ten Commandments. A tallit and tzitzit would be placed on the bed along with a book or a page from the Talmud. For a baby girl, young girls would come to the house for the ceremony, no scriptural verses were read, and part of a bridal garment would be placed in the cradle. For both male and female babies, the children would lift the cradle three times, while calling “Holi Kreisch, wie soll das Kind heissen?” (English: Holi Kreisch, what is the child’s name?). Then the child’s chosen secular name would be repeated three times. Nuts, sweets and fruits would be distributed to the guests. According to Juspa Schammes’ account, the sweets would be handed out to the girls inside the house, whereas for boys, they would be thrown out into the street for them to gather up.

== Modern practice ==
While there are few or no accounts of the Hollekreisch in the eighteenth century, the fact that it is still performed in areas of the Rhein valley and Alsace testifies to its continuance through the centuries. By the nineteenth century, it seems to have become a ceremony mainly performed for girls.

The ritual is mentioned in the Avodat Israel siddur, a prayer book with a set order of daily prayers, that is considered by many to be the authoritative documentation of German-Jewish tradition. Although the Avodat Israel siddur lists the verses to be said when a boy gives a newborn his secular name, it does not further describe the Hollekreisch ceremony. The 2009 Koren Sacks Siddur includes a ceremony for welcoming newborn girls, confirming an increased interest in celebrating girls, as well as confirming the fact that this is a regional tradition specific to the Franco-German border in the Rhine valley.

Although Sephardic Jews' zeved habat name-giving ritual is more widely known, the Ashkenazi Hollekreisch ceremony has also gained more popularity in recent years, developing many local variations. Expanding on the standardized Biblical verses, many ceremonies have come to include a wide range of different words according to local tradition, as well as varying pronunciations of the word “Holle”. Binyomin Schomo Hamburger describes as many as twenty variations through the nineteenth and twentieth centuries.

== See also ==
- Brit milah
- Zeved habat
