= Dominik Bacher =

German footballer

Personal information
- Date of birth: 19 June 2002 (age 24)
- Position: Forward

Team information
- Current team: 1860 Rosenheim (on loan from SpVgg Unterhaching)

Youth career
- –2018: 1.FC Garmisch-Partenkirchen
- 2018–2020: SpVgg Unterhaching

Senior career*
Years	Team	Apps	(Gls)
2020–	SpVgg Unterhaching	2	(0)
2020–	→ 1860 Rosenheim (loan)	0	(0)
- * Club domestic league appearances and goals as of 13:42, 10 September 2020 (UTC)

Dominik Bacher (born 19 June 2002) is a German footballer who currently plays as a forward for TSV 1860 Rosenheim on loan from SpVgg Unterhaching.

== Career ==
He joined 1860 Rosenheim on loan in September 2020.

== Career statistics ==
=== Club ===
As of 27 June 2020

Club	Season	League			Cup		Continental		Other		Total	
Club	Season	Division	Apps	Goals	Apps	Goals	Apps	Goals	Apps	Goals	Apps	Goals
SpVgg Unterhaching	2019–20	3. Liga	2	0	0	0	–		0	0	2	0
Career total			2	0	0	0	0	0	0	0	2	0
