= Institute of Jewish Studies =

Institute of Jewish Studies may refer to:

- Diane and Guilford Glazer Institute of Jewish Studies, Nanjing, China
- St. Petersburg Institute of Jewish Studies, Russia
- Institute of Jewish Studies (Free University) at the Free University of Berlin, Germany
- UCL Institute of Jewish Studies, University College London, UK
- Institute of Jewish Studies of the Hebrew University of Jerusalem, Israel
- Pardes Institute of Jewish Studies, Jerusalem, Israel
- Schechter Institute of Jewish Studies, Jerusalem, Israel

== See also ==
- Jewish studies § Schools that offer Jewish studies
