= History of the Jews in China =

Chinese Jews
中国犹太人 יהודים סיניים

Regions with significant populations
- Kaifeng, Shanghai, Ningbo, Harbin, Manzhouli

Languages
- Hebrew (liturgical), English, Chinese, Judeo-Persian (historic)

Religion
- Judaism

Related ethnic groups
- Hui people Ashkenazi Jews • Sephardic Jews • Mizrahi Jews; Other Jewish ethnic divisions

The history of the Jewish people in China goes back to antiquity. Modern day Jews in China are predominantly composed of Sephardic Jews and their descendants. Other Jewish ethnic divisions are also represented, including Ashkenazi Jews, Mizrahi Jews and a number of converts to Judaism.

The Jewish Chinese community manifests a wide range of Jewish cultural traditions and it also encompasses the full spectrum of Jewish religious observance. Though a small minority, Chinese Jews have had an open presence in the country since the arrival of the first Jewish immigrants during the 8th century CE. Relatively isolated communities of Jews developed through the Han and Song dynasties (7th to 13th centuries CE) all the way through the Qing dynasty (19th century), most notably the Kaifeng Jews (the term "Chinese Jews" is often used in a restricted sense in order to refer to these communities). In the 19th and early 20th centuries, Jewish merchants from around the world began to trade in Chinese ports, particularly in the commercial centres of Hong Kong, which was for a time a British colony; Shanghai (the International Settlement and French Concession); and Harbin (the Trans-Siberian Railway). In the first half of the 20th century, thousands of Jewish refugees escaping from pogroms in the Russian Empire arrived in China. By the time of the establishment of the People's Republic of China in 1949, only a few Jews were known to have maintained the practice of their religion and culture. Since 2015, descendants of the Kaifeng Jews have come under government pressure and suspicion.

== Overview ==
The presence of a community of Jewish immigrants in China arguably began sometime in the Song dynasty, but a number of scholars have argued for its presence in China during the earlier Tang dynasty. In the 9th century, the Persian geographer Ibn Khordadbeh noted the travels of Jewish merchants called Radhanites, whose trade took them to China via the Silk Road through Central Asia and India. He mentioned the presence of Jewish merchants in a number of Chinese cities, and the important economic role they played transporting merchandise as well as transmitting scientific and technological expertise all the way from Spain and France via the Middle East to China by land and by sea. The medieval Italian explorer Jacob of Ancona, the supposed author of a book of travels, was a scholarly Jewish merchant who wrote in vernacular Italian, and he reached China in 1271, although some authors question its veracity.

When the Ming dynasty closed off the Silk Road by land, Ningbo became an important trading port on the Maritime Silk Road. The 1489 stone tablet stated that the Jewish communities of Ningbo and Kaifeng had a very good relationship with each other and that after the Kaifeng Jews lost their holy texts during a flood in 1461, the Ningbo Jews gave two Torah scrolls to their brethren in Kaifeng. The tablet stated, "When the synagogue was rebuilt, Shi Bin, Li Rong, and Gao Jian, and Zhang Xuan went to Ningbo and brought back a scroll of the Scriptures. Zhao Ying of Ningbo brought another scroll to Kaifeng and respectfully presented it to our synagogue". It is believed the Ningbo Jewish community was fairly sizable for a smaller one would not be able to spare two Torah scrolls. The availability of these scrolls could also mean the Ningbo Jewish community was vibrant and observant. The descendants of the Ningbo Jewish community moved out of Ningbo to Shanghai and Hong Kong in the early 20th century due to war and to seek better economic opportunities; they have built a reputation for achieving immense success in the business, science and media industries.

During the period of China's opening to the West which coincided with the period of British quasi-colonialism, the first group of Jews who settled in China consisted of Jews who arrived in China under British protection following the First Opium War. Many of these Jews were of Indian or Iraqi origin, due to significant British colonialism in these regions. The second Jewish community settled in China during the first decades of the 20th century when many Jews arrived in Hong Kong and Shanghai during those cities' periods of economic expansion. Many more Jews arrived as refugees from the Russian Revolution of 1917. During the late 1930s and 1940s, a surge of individual Jews and a serge of Jewish families settled in China for the purpose of seeking refuge from the Holocaust in Europe and they were predominantly of European origin. Shanghai was notable for its special area established for the housing of Jewish refugees, most of them left after the war, the rest of them relocated either prior to or immediately after the establishment of the People's Republic of China.

Some Jews who lived in China converted to Islam and became Hui Muslims.

A manuscript states that they prayed in both Hebrew and Chinese. Ancient Jewish communities in China adapted well to the Han Chinese customs, including patrilineal descent and intermarriage with Han Chinese, while maintaining their Jewish identities. Over the centuries, most of the Jewish community came to be virtually indistinguishable from the Han and Hui Chinese population. Due to the fact that Chinese Jews historically hold a strong Chinese identity, the current government does not recognize them as one of the 56 ethnic minorities.

Since their religious practices are considered functionally extinct, under the Law of Return, they are required to undergo conversions to Orthodox Judaism in order to become eligible for expedited immigration to Israel.

Some international Jewish communities are beginning to search for the descendants of these Jews in an attempt to help them revive their interest in their Jewish roots.

Since the expansion of the University of Nottingham Ningbo China in Zhejiang province, more Jewish scholars have moved there in an attempt to reach out to the Jewish Communities of Zhejiang, including a prominent tribe which lives in Ningbo.

Contrary to a popular belief in the Western world, the Kaifeng Jews are not the only Chinese Jewish community. The Kaifeng Jews are recognized as Jews because they have become more observant in modern times, but they are just one of many ancient Jewish communities which live in China. The Ningbo Jews are also known for their contributions to their Jewish Heritage, but nowadays, they are non-practicing Jews. The term "Kaifeng Jews" is not interchangeable with "Chinese Jews".

== History ==
Some scholars have claimed that the ancestors of the Jews who have historically resided in various places in China were members of the Ten Lost Tribes of the exiled ancient Kingdom of Israel which relocated to places which were located in present-day China. The observance of some ancient Jewish rituals has been documented in some places.

One well-known group was the Kaifeng Jews, who are purported to have traveled from Persia to India during the mid-Han dynasty and later migrated from the Muslim-inhabited regions of northwestern China (modern day Gansu province) to Henan province during the early Northern Song dynasty (960–1127). Kaifeng Jews were most prominent between the tenth and eighteenth centuries.

=== Origins ===
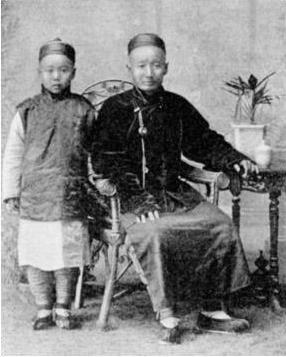
Jews of Kaifeng, late 19th or early 20th century

According to an oral tradition, the first Jews immigrated to China through Persia after the Roman Emperor Titus's capture of Jerusalem in 70 CE. A large number of Jews emigrated from Persia during the reign of Emperor Ming of Han (58–75 CE). Writing in 1900, Father Joseph Brucker hypothesized that Jews came to China from India by a sea route in ancient times.

Three steles with inscriptions which were found at Kaifeng bear some historical suggestions. The oldest, dating from 1489, commemorates the construction of a synagogue (1163) (bearing the name Qingzhen Si, a term for a mosque which is frequently used in Chinese), states that the Jews entered China from India in the Later Han dynasty (25–220 CE), the Jews' 70 Chinese surnames, their audience with an "unnamed" Song dynasty emperor, and it finally lists the transmission of their religion from Abraham down to the prophet Ezra. The second tablet, which dates back to 1512 (found in the Xuanzhang Daojing Si synagogue) contains a detailed description of the Jews' religious practices. The third tablet dates back to 1663 and it commemorates the re-rebuilding of the Qingzhen Si synagogue and it also recaps the information which is written on the other two steles.

Father Joseph Brucker believed that Matteo Ricci's manuscripts state that only approximately ten or twelve Jewish families lived in Kaifeng in the late 16th and early 17th centuries, and that they had reportedly resided there for five or six hundred years. The manuscripts also state that a larger Jewish community lived in Hangzhou. The Jewish community of Hangzhou was larger than the Jewish community of Kaifeng because loyal Jews fled south to Hangzhou along with the soon-to-be crowned Emperor Gaozong. In fact, the 1489 stele states that the Jews "abandoned Bianliang" (Kaifeng) after the Jingkang Incident.

Many Jewish communities were established in China during the Middle Ages. However, not all of them left evidence of their existence. The following is a list of the names of those Jewish communities which are known about today: Kaifeng, Hangzhou, Ningbo, Yangzhou, Ningxia, Guangzhou, Beijing, Quanzhou, Nanjing, Xi'an and Luoyang.

=== Names ===
Today, the Chinese term for Jews is Youtairen (Chinese: 猶太人; Jyutping: jau4 taai3 jan4). The proper pronunciation of these terms is similar to the proper pronunciation of the term Yehudai (יהודאי)—the Aramaic word for Jew—and to Iudaios (Ἰουδαῖος), the Greek word for Jew.

Historically, the Chinese people called Judaism Tiaojinjiao (挑筋教), loosely translated as "the religion which removes the sinew," probably referring to the Jewish dietary prohibition against eating the sciatic nerve (from Genesis 32:32).

Jewish dietary laws (kashrut), which forbid the eating of, among other foods, non-ruminant mammals, shellfish and reptiles, would have most likely caused Jewish communities to stand out from the surrounding mainstream Chinese population, as Chinese culture is typically very free in the range of items it deems suitable for food.

Jews have also been called the Blue Hat Hui (Chinese: 藍帽回; pinyin: Lánmào Húi), in contrast to other populations of Hui people, who have identified with hats of other colors. The distinction between Muslim and Jewish Hui is not, and historically has not been, well recognised by the dominant Han population.

A modern translation of the "Kaifeng Steles" has shown that the Jews referred to their synagogue as Qingzhen Si (Chinese: 清真寺; lit. 'The Pure and Truth'), which is the same as the modern Chinese term for mosques. Qingzhen Si and Libai Si (禮拜寺) were used as names both for Jewish synagogues and Islamic mosques.

According to an oral tradition which was documented by Xu Xin, Director of the Centre for Judaic Studies at Nanjing University, in his book Legends of the Chinese Jews of Kaifeng, the Kaifeng Jews called Judaism Yicileye jiao (Chinese: 一賜樂業教; lit. 'the religion of Israel'). Yicileye is a transliteration and partial translation of "Israel". Xu Xin translates this phrase as "Chosen people, endowed by God, and contented with their lives and work".

=== Early record ===
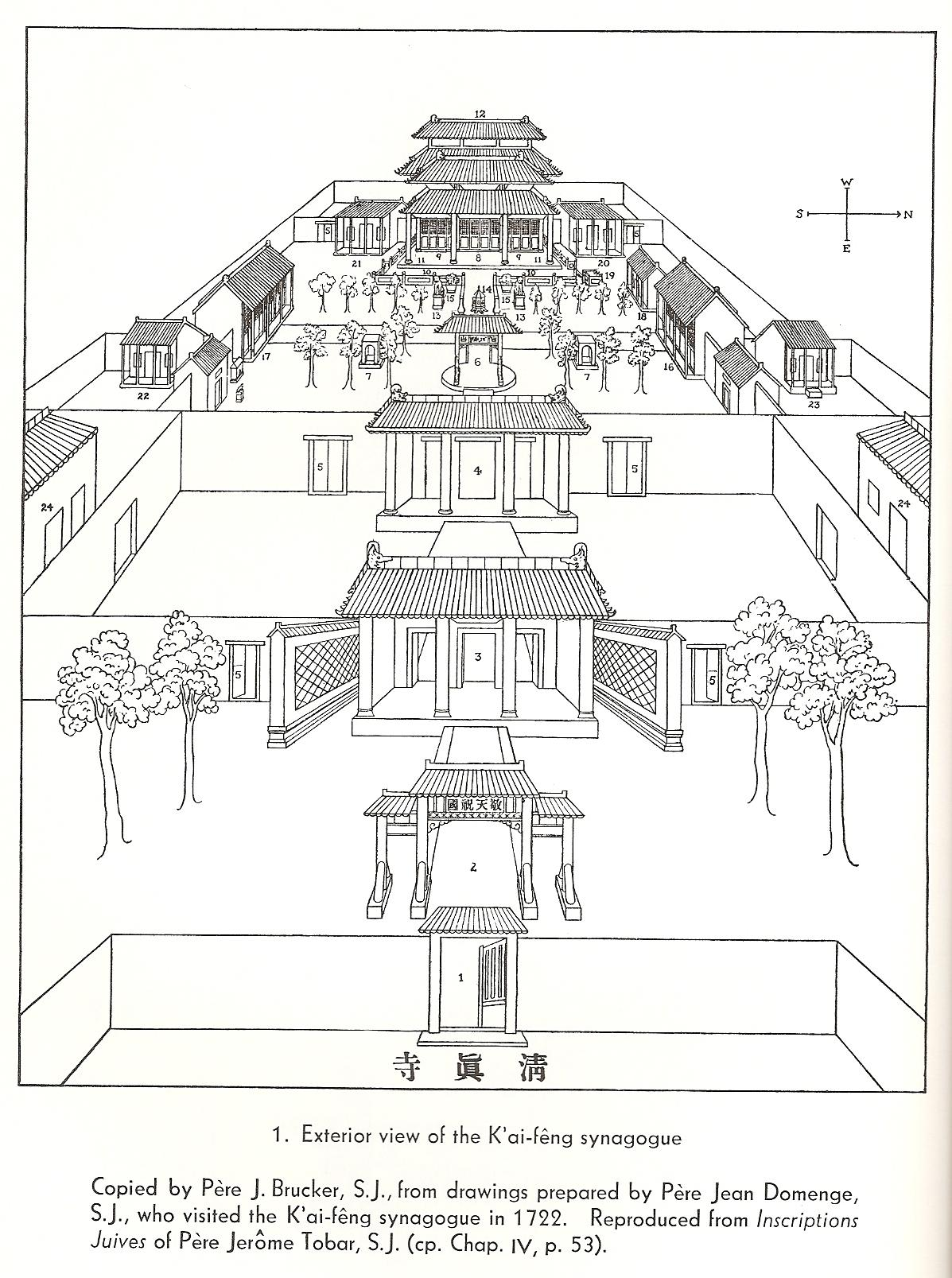
Bird's eye view of the synagogue of Kaifeng.

The oldest evidence of the presence of Jews in China dates back to the beginning of the 8th century: a business letter which was written in the Judeo-Persian language, discovered by Marc Aurel Stein. The letter (now housed in the British Museum) was found in Dandan Uiliq, an important post along the Silk Road in northwest China during the Tang dynasty (618–907). The text is thirty-seven lines in length and was written on paper, a product then manufactured only in China. It was identified, by David Samuel Margoliouth, as dating from 718 CE. Ibn Zeyd al Hassan of Siraf, a 9th-century Arabian traveler, reports that in 878 followers of the Chinese rebel leader Huang Chao besieged Canton (Guangzhou) and killed a large number of foreign merchants, Arabs, Persians, Christians and Jews, resident there.

At Dandan Oilik an 8th-century document written in Judeo-Persian was found and translated by Aurel Stein.

Sources indicate that Jews in China were often mistaken for Muslims by other Chinese. The first plausible recorded written Chinese mention of Jews uses the term Zhuhu (竹忽) or Zhuhudu (朱乎得) (perhaps from Arabic Yehoud or from Hebrew Yehudim, "Jews") found in the Annals of the Yuan Dynasty in 1329 and 1354. The text spoke of the reinforcement of a tax levied on "dissenters" and of a government decree that the Jews come en masse to Beijing, the capital.

Venetian traveler Marco Polo, who visited China, then under the Yuan dynasty, in the late 13th century, described the prominence of Jewish traders in Beijing. Similar references can be found in the notes of the Franciscan John of Montecorvino, first archbishop of the Roman Catholic Archdiocese of Beijing in the early 14th century, and the writings of Ibn Batuta, an Arabian envoy to the Mongol Empire in the middle of the 14th century.

Genghis Khan called both Jews and Muslims "Huihui" when he forbade Jews and Muslims from practicing kosher and halal preparation of their food, calling both of them "slaves" and forcing them to eat Mongol food, and banned them from practicing circumcision.

Among all the [subject] alien peoples only the Hui-hui say "we do not eat Mongol food". [Cinggis Qa'an replied:] "By the aid of heaven we have pacified you; you are our slaves. Yet you do not eat our food or drink. How can this be right?" He thereupon made them eat. "If you slaughter sheep, you will be considered guilty of a crime." He issued a regulation to that effect ... [In 1279/1280 under Qubilai] all the Muslims say: "if someone else slaughters [the animal] we do not eat". Because the poor people are upset by this, from now on, Musuluman [Muslim] Huihui and Zhuhu [Jewish] Huihui, no matter who kills [the animal] will eat [it] and must cease slaughtering sheep themselves, and cease the rite of circumcision.

During the Ming dynasty (1368–1644), a Ming emperor conferred seven surnames upon the Jews, by which they are identifiable today: Ai (艾), Shi (石), Gao (高), Jin (金), Li (李), Zhang (張), and Zhao (趙). Two of these, Jin and Shi, are the equivalent of common Jewish names in the west: Gold and Stone.

The first modern Western record of Jews residing in China is found in the records of the 17th-century Jesuit missionaries in Beijing. The prominent Jesuit Matteo Ricci, received a visit from a young Jewish Chinese man in 1605. Ricci mentioned this man's name as Ngai, who has since been identified by the French sinologist Paul Pelliot as a Jew named Ai T'ien, who explained that the community he belonged to was monotheistic, or believing in only one God. It is recorded that when he saw a Christian image of Mary with the child Jesus, he took it to be a picture of Rebecca with Esau or Jacob, figures from Hebrew Scripture. Ngai (Ai Tian, Ai T'ien) declared that he had come from Kaifeng, and stated that this was the site of a large Jewish population. Ricci sent an ethnic Chinese Jesuit Lay Brother to visit Kaifeng; later, other Jesuits (mostly European) also visited the city. It was later discovered that the Jewish community had a synagogue (Lǐbài Sì), which was constructed facing the west (towards Jerusalem), and housed a number of written materials and books.

The Jews who managed the synagogue were called "Mullahs". Floods and fire repeatedly destroyed the books of the Kaifeng synagogue. They obtained some from Ningxia and Ningbo to replace them. Another Hebrew roll of law was bought from a Muslim in Ning-keang-chow in Shanxi, who acquired it from a dying Jew at Guangzhou.

The Chinese called Muslims, Jews, and Christians in ancient times by the same name, "Hui Hui" (Hwuy-hwuy). Crossworshipers (Christians) were called the "Huay who abstain from animals without the cloven foot", Muslims were called "Hwuy who abstain from pork", Jews were called "Hwuy who extract the sinews (removes the sciatic nerve)". Hwuy-tsze (Hui zi) or Hwuy-hwuy (Hui Hui) is presently used almost exclusively for Muslims, but Jews were still called Lan Maou Hwuy tsze (Lan mao Hui zi) which means "Blue cap Hui zi". At Kaifeng, Jews were called "Teaou kin keaou "extract sinew religion". Jews and Muslims in China shared the same name for synagogue and mosque, which were both called "Tsing-chin sze" (Qingzhen si) "Temple of Purity and Truth", the name dated to the 13th century. The synagogue and mosques were also known as Le-pae sze (Libai si). A tablet indicated that Judaism was once known as "Yih-tsze-lo-nee-keaou" (israelitish religion) and synagogues known as Yih-tsze lo nee leen (Israelitish Temple), but it faded out of use.

A Muslim in Nanjing told Semedo that four families of Jews converted to Islam since they were the last Jews in Nanjing, their numbers diminishing.

Various Jewish Chinese individuals worked in government service and owned big properties in China in the 17th century.

Shanghai's first wave of Jews came in the second half of the 19th century, many being Mizrahi Jews from Iraq. The first Jew who arrived there was Elias David Sassoon, who, about the year 1850, opened a branch in connection with his father's Bombay house. Since that period Jews gradually migrated from India to Shanghai, most of them being engaged from Bombay as clerks by the firm of David Sassoon & Co. The community was composed mainly of "Asian", (Sephardi) German, and Russian Jews, though there were a few of Austrian, French, and Italian origin among them. Jews took a considerable part in developing trade in China, and several served on the municipal councils, among them being Silas Aaron Hardoon, partner in the firm of E. D. Sassoon & Co., who served on the French and English councils at the same time. During the early days of Jewish settlement in Shanghai, Jews were involved in the trade in opium and Bombay cotton yarn.

== Modern times ==
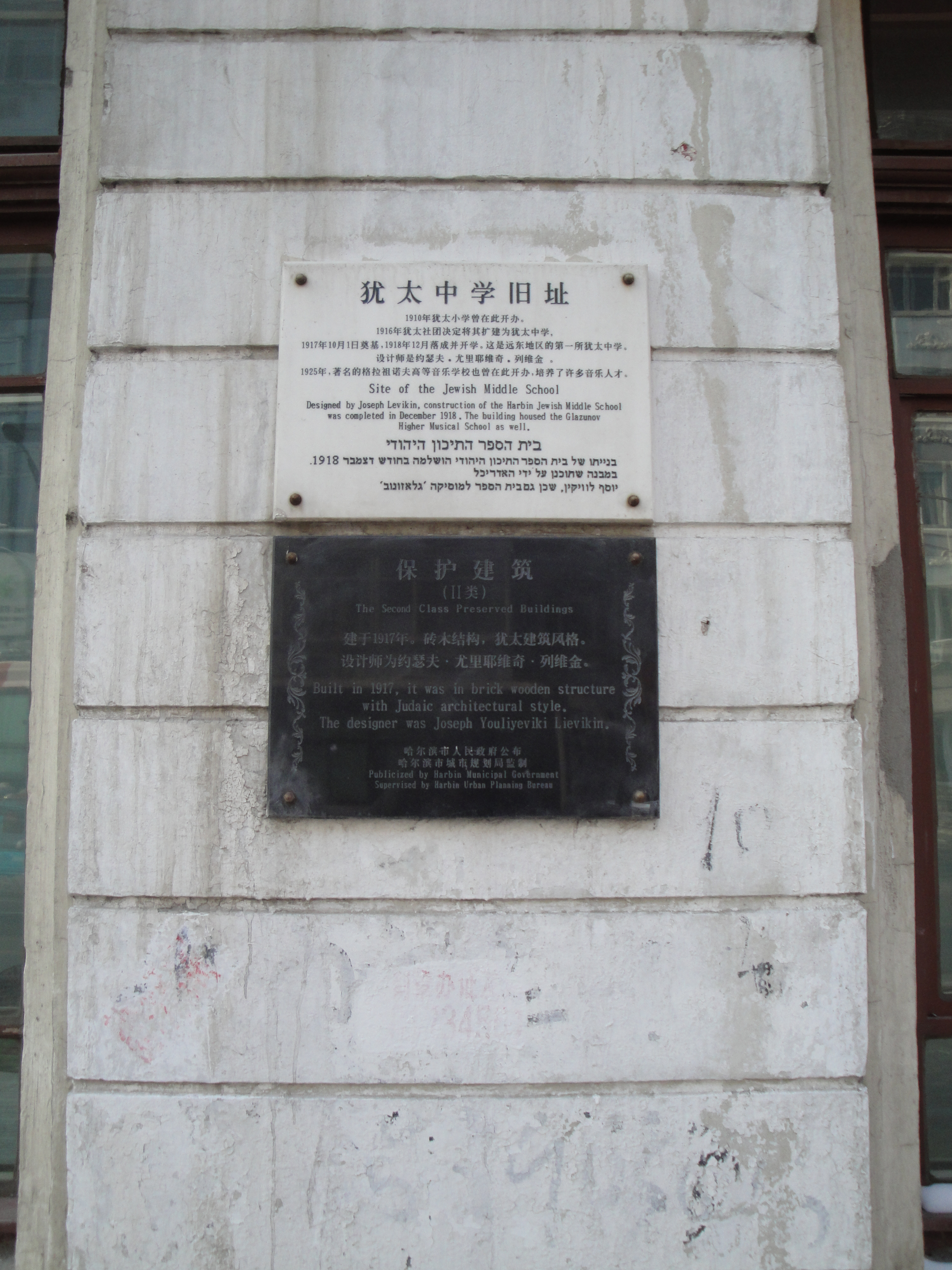
A plaque commemorates the former Jewish Middle School in Harbin, now the No. 2 Korean Middle School.

Contemporaneous sources estimated the Jewish population in China in 1940—including Manchukuo—at 36,000 (source: Catholic Encyclopedia).

In the 19th and early 20th centuries, Jewish merchants from around the world began to trade in Chinese ports, particularly in the commercial centres of Hong Kong, which was for a time a British colony; Shanghai (the International Settlement and French Concession); and Harbin (the Trans-Siberian Railway). In the first half of the 20th century, thousands of Jewish refugees escaping from pogroms in the Russian Empire arrived in China. By the time of the establishment of the People's Republic of China in 1949, only a few Jews were known to have maintained the practice of their religion and culture. China's Jewish communities have been ethnically diverse, ranging from the Jews of Kaifeng and all other ports throughout China. Kaifeng Jewish ancestry has been found among their descendants living among the Hui Muslims, such as during a hajj pilgrimage the Hui Muslim woman Jin Xiaojing (金效靜) found out about her Jewish ancestry and wrote about it in an article, "China's Jews" (中国的犹太人) published in "Points East" in 1981. Scholars have pointed out that Hui Muslims may have absorbed Kaifeng Jews instead of Han Confucians and Buddhists. Jewish converts to Islam who became Hui Muslims in 16th-century China were called the blue hat Hui (藍帽回回) since they converted to Islam due to similarities in their traditions. One of the seven prominent Hui Muslim clans of Kaifeng, the Zhang Jewish clan, became Muslim. The Zhang family, among several Hui Muslims with Kaifeng Jewish ancestry call themselves "fake Muslims" since they are openly proud of their ancestry Instead of being absorbed into Han, a portion of the Jews of China of Kaifeng became Hui Muslims. In 1948, Samuel Stupa Shih (施洪模) said he saw a Hebrew language "Religion of Israel" Jewish inscription on a tombstone in a Qing dynasty Muslim cemetery to a place west of Hangzhou. It is reported that they came to be more or less totally assimilated into the Hui Muslim populace, due to widespread intermarriage; especially during the Ming dynasty. In the late 20th and early 21st centuries, however, some international Jewish groups, most notably Shavei Israel, have helped Chinese Jews rediscover their Jewish heritage and reconnect with their Jewish roots.

=== Shanghai ===
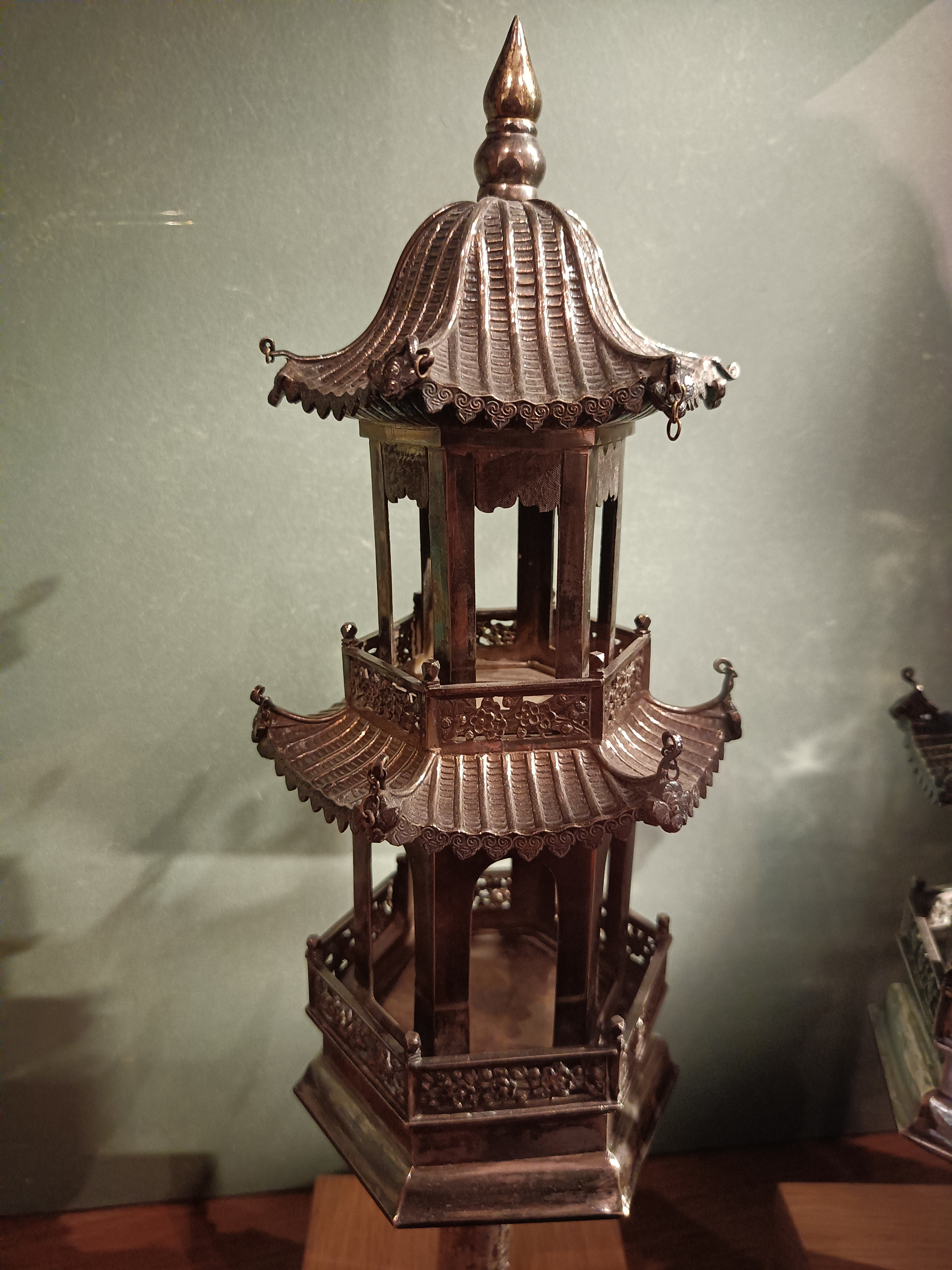
Torah finial in the shape of a pagoda from 19th-century Shanghai (Musée d'Art et d'Histoire du Judaïsme)

Shanghai Jewish communities included Baghdadi Jews and Ashkenazi Jews from Russia, Eastern Europe, and Central Europe.

The Baghdadi and Russian Ashkenazi communities predated the influx of Jewish refugees from Nazi Germany and German-occupied Europe. Baghdadi Jews came as merchants, including via India in the mid-1850s. In 1887, a major donation from David Sassoon funded the establishment of Beth-El, Shanghai's first formally established synagogue.

Later, after World War I, many Ashkenazi Jews came from Europe.

Rebbe Meir Ashkenazi (Chabad-Lubavitch) was the Chief Rabbi of Shanghai (1926–1949).

The Shanghai Jewish Refugees Museum commemorates the experience of Jewish refugees. Israeli Prime Minister Benjamin Netanyahu visited the museum and praised Shanghai's historic role as a sanctuary for Jewish refugees.

=== Russian Jews ===
In the early 20th century, many Russian Jews fleeing pogroms in several towns in Russian Empire decided to move to northeast China for permanent settlement (Rabbi Aharon Moshe Kiselev served in Harbin from 1913 until his death in 1949). After the Russian Revolution of 1917, many White Russians, fled to Harbin (former Manchuria). These included, among others, Dr. Abraham Kaufman, who played a leading role in the Harbin Jewish community after 1919, and the parents of future Israeli Prime Minister Ehud Olmert. According to estimates, over 20,000 Jews lived in Harbin and played a key role in the shaping of local politics, economy and international trade.

Soviet Russian Jew Grigori Voitinsky played an important role in the establishment of the Chinese Communist Party (CCP) in 1921 through the Comintern.

Sun Yat-sen, founder of the Republic of China, admired the Jewish people and Zionism, and he also saw parallels between the persecution of Jews and the domination of China by the Western powers. He stated, "Though their country was destroyed, the Jewish nation has existed to this day ... [Zionism] is one of the greatest movements of the present time. All lovers of democracy cannot help but support wholeheartedly and welcome with enthusiasm the movement to restore your wonderful and historic nation, which has contributed so much to the civilization of the world and which rightfully deserve [sic] an honorable place in the family of nations."

The Japanese occupation of Northeast China in 1931 and the establishment of Manchukuo in 1932 had a negative impact on the Harbin Jewish community (13,000 in 1929). White Russian fascist elements engaged in antisemitism towards the Jews of Harbin and the Japanese authorities tolerated this antisemitism. Most of those Jews left Harbin for Tianjin, Shanghai and the British Mandate of Palestine. Until 1939, the Russian Jews were about 5,000 in Shanghai.

=== World War II ===
Another wave of 18,000 Jews from Germany, Austria, and Poland immigrated to Shanghai in the late 1930s and early 1940s to escape the Holocaust. Shanghai was an important safe-haven for Jewish refugees during the Holocaust, since it was one of the few places in the world that did not need require a visa or travel documents. The chaos of Shanghai during the war with Japan also meant that there were no customs officials, and therefore refugees (and others) were able to simply pass by the customs house when they arrived in the city. The Jewish communities already existing in China (Baghdadi Jews from the British colonies and Ashkenazi Jews from Russia) welcomed refugees and already had institutions such as synagogues which Jewish refugees could join.

Some Chinese diplomats such as Ho Feng Shan issued "protective" passports and the Japanese diplomat Chiune Sugihara issued transit visas with which refugees could go to Shanghai after a short stay in Japan.

The Japanese occupiers of Shanghai did not initially treat Jews harshly. Among other factors, Japan sought to avoid harsh treatment of Jews in Shanghai so as not to antagonize the USSR and the United States.

In 1941, Japanese forces began systematically taking control of the areas of Shanghai which they had not previously occupied. In November of that year, Nazi Germany stripped Jews abroad of their citizenship, resulting in Jews abroad becoming stateless refugees. In 1943, the occupying Japanese army required these 18,000 Jewish "stateless refugees" to relocate to an area of 0.75 square miles (1.9 km^{2}) in Shanghai's Hongkew district (today known as the Hongkou District) where many lived in group homes called "Heime".

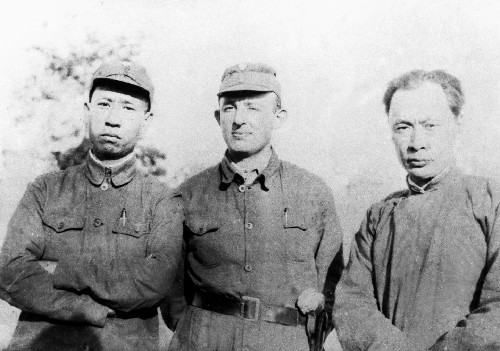
Jakob Rosenfeld, a doctor for the New Fourth Army, between Liu Shaoqi (left) and Chen Yi (right).

Notable Jews during the Second Sino-Japanese War include Dr. Jakob Rosenfeld, Stanisław Flato, Ruth Weiss, Eva Sandberg (photographer and wife of Communist leader Xiao San), and Morris Abraham Cohen.

Late in the war, Nazi representatives pressured the Japanese army to devise a plan to exterminate Shanghai's Jewish population, and this pressure eventually became known to the Jewish community's leadership. However, the Japanese had no intention of further provoking the anger of the Allies after their already notorious invasion of China and their additional invasion of a number of other Asian nations, so they delayed the German request until the War ended. With the intercession of the Amshenower Rebbe and the translation skills of Leo (Ariyeh) Hanin, the Japanese ultimately kept the Jews of Shanghai safe.

In general, in the period from 1845 to 1945, more than 40,000 Jews came to China to do business or in search of a safe haven.

=== Late 20th century ===
Soon after the defeat of the Japanese and the dissolution of the Shanghai ghetto, the Jewish refugees left, primarily to live in Palestine, the USA, Australia, Canada, and the Soviet Union, with a small amount going to Germany and Austria. 7,270 of the Central European Jewish refugees in Shanghai in 1947, 1,700 in 1949, and 21 in the 1960s. The non-refugee Jewish communities of Shanghai also decreased in size during the 1950s. The well-established Baghdadi Jewish families transferred their businesses to places including Hong Kong and the Bahamas. During the 1950s, the largest destinations for departing Jews from Shanghai were Israel, followed by the Soviet Union.

Prominent non-Chinese Jews living in China from the establishment of the People's Republic of China to the contemporary period included Sidney Shapiro, Israel Epstein, and Ruth Weiss. A Jewish American, Sidney Rittenberg, served as interpreter to many top Chinese officials. Klara Blum established herself as one of the few Jewish women writers in post-1949 China.

Structured Jewish life returned to Beijing in 1979 with the founding of Kehillat Beijing, an egalitarian lay-led community serving ex-patriate Jews from all over the world.

Sara Imas, the Shanghai-born daughter of Shanghai's Jewish Club president, Leiwi Imas, became the first Chinese Jewish immigrant to Israel after the two countries established formal diplomatic relations in 1992. Leiwi Imas, who had to leave Germany for Poland in 1939, arrived in Shanghai the same year. He spent his final years in Shanghai until 1962, prior to the beginning of the Cultural Revolution. Although Sara Imas's non-Chinese appearance and family background brought her much trouble during the Cultural Revolution when she was accused of being a foreign capitalist and spy, today Sara Imas has returned to Shanghai, working as the Chinese representative of an Israeli diamond company.

On June 27, 1985, an international group of scholars and activists gathered in Palo Alto, California to establish the Sino-Judaic Institute. Rabbi Anson Laytner serves as the incumbent president.

The Institute of Jewish Studies was established at Nanjing University in 1992.

Since the 1990s, the Shanghai municipal government has taken the initiative to preserve historical Western architectures that were constructed during Shanghai's colonial past. Many formerly Jewish-owned hotels and private residence have been included in the preservation project. In 1997, the Kadoorie-residence-turned Shanghai Children's Palace, had their spacious front garden largely removed in order to make room for the city's overpass system under construction. A One Day Tour of the history of Jewish presence in Shanghai can be arranged through the Center of Jewish Studies Shanghai. Rabbi Shalom Greenberg from Chabad-Lubavitch in New York City arrived in Shanghai to serve this community in August 1998. Rabbi Arthur Schneier, president of the Appeal of Conscience Foundation of New York, donated a Torah to the community that same year. On the first day of Rosh Hashanah, in September 1999, a Jewish New Year service was held at the Ohel Rachel Synagogue for the first time since 1952.

=== 21st century ===
As of 2010, it is estimated that 2,000 to 3,000 Jews lived in Shanghai. In May 2010, the Ohel Rachel Synagogue in Shanghai was temporarily reopened to the local Jewish community for weekend services. Synagogues are found in Beijing, Shanghai and Hong Kong, serving both native Chinese Jews, Israelis and diaspora Jewish communities across the world.

In 2001, Rabbi Shimon Freundlich from the Chabad-Lubavitch movement came and settled in Beijing with the mission of building and leading the Chabad-Lubavitch Centre of Beijing. Kehillat Beijing continues its practice of conducting weekly lay-led Shabbat services, regular holiday observance, and community activities including retreats and celebrations. In 2007, the Sephardic community of Shanghai opened a synagogue, study hall, kosher kitchen, and educational classes for children and adults. The community has its own hacham, who functions as a teacher and chazan, in addition to Rabbi Ephraim Bezalel, who manages local community affairs and kashrut needs. Since a significant amount of Chinese food products and food ingredients are exported to the American market, a number of kosher certification agencies send rabbis to China to serve as kosher inspectors (mashgichim). As of 2009, over 50 mashgichim have been stationed in China, seven of them from the Orthodox Union.

As of 2019, Harbin could claim a single Jewish inhabitant, professor Dan Ben-Canaan, who helped advise the local government on restoring the city's synagogues and other Jewish-related buildings.

Kaifeng's Jewish community has reported increasing suppression by the authorities since 2015, reversing the modest revival it experienced in the 1990s. The observance of public religious services and the celebration of religious festivals like Passover and Sukkot have been prohibited, and Jewish community groups have been shut down. Signs have been removed from the Kaifeng Synagogue, a historical site located on Teaching the Torah Lane that is now under strict surveillance.

==== Antisemitism ====
Antisemitism in the People's Republic of China is mostly a 21st-century phenomenon. There is little evidence of antisemitism in China in historical sources. During the Reform and Opening Up period, academics noted that the spread of philosemitism, which depicts Jews as naturally intelligent and financially savvy, gained traction in the popular press. In the 2020s, antisemitic conspiracy theories began to spread and intensify in China. While there is not a large Jewish diaspora in China, much of the antisemitism is claimed by some to come from Chinese nationalists and anti-Israel leftists, as part of a reaction against supposed foreign encirclement and influence, although the link between anti-Israel sentiment and antisemitism is debated. Some Chinese people believe in antisemitic tropes that Jews secretly rule the world.

== Notable people ==
- Sir Michael David Kadoorie, a Hong Kong businessman, chair and part owner of CLP Group
- Stanley Ho, founder and former chair of SJM Holdings, casino operator in Macau
- Daisy Ho, Stanley Ho's daughter, chair and executive director of SJM Holdings
- Josie Ho, Stanley Ho's daughter, Hong Kong-based actress
- Pansy Ho, Stanley Ho's daughter, managing director of Shun Tak Holdings
- Sabrina Ho, Stanley Ho's daughter
- Robert Hotung, grand-uncle of Stanley Ho and martial artist Bruce Lee
- Ron Klinger, an Australian bridge writer, born in Shanghai to European parents
- Mike Medavoy, an American film producer, born in Shanghai of Russian-Ukrainian descent
- Laurence Tribe, an American constitutional law professor, born in Shanghai to a Polish-born father and Harbin-born mother
- Harry Triguboff, an Australian property developer, born in Dalian to Russian parents
- Zhao Yingcheng, a high-ranking Ming-dynasty government official from the 17th century, member of the Kaifeng Jewish community

== See also ==
- Antisemitism in China
- China–Israel relations
- Chinese people in Israel
- Israelis in China
- East Asian Jews
- Jews in Hong Kong
- Jews in Taiwan
- Kaifeng Jews
- Ten Lost Tribes
- Groups claiming affiliation with Israelites
- Religion in China
- Freedom of religion in China
- Antireligious campaigns in China
- Shanghai Ghetto
