= Chinese Jews =

Chinese Jews may refer to:

- History of the Jews in China
- History of the Jews in Taiwan
- Kaifeng Jews
