= Beth El Synagogue (Shanghai) =

Former synagogue in China

Religion
- Affiliation: Judaism (former)
- Rite: Nusach Sefard
- Ecclesiastical or organizational status: Synagogue (1887–1920)

Location
- Location: Peking Road, Shanghai
- Country: China

Architecture
- Established: 1887 (as a congregation)
- Completed: 1887
- Destroyed: c. 1950s

The Beth El Synagogue was a synagogue, located in Shanghai, China.

Jews began to settle in Shanghai in 1848. At that time, most were Sephardic Jews from Baghdad and Bombay. During the 1870s, the Baghdadi Jewish community used rented space for religious worship. Beth El Synagogue was established in 1887. It was located on Peking Road, a major thoroughfare in the English settlement, and was the first formally established Synagogue in Shanghai.

Jacob Elias and Edward Elias Sassoon built the Ohel Rachel Synagogue to replace Beth El Synagogue; and it opened in March 1920. The synagogue was destroyed, most likely in the 1950s.

== See also ==
- History of the Jews in China
- List of synagogues in Shanghai
