= History of the Jews in Harbin =

The Harbin Jewish community was a predominantly Russian-Jewish community in the People's Republic of China, and was the largest community in Chinese Jewry in particular and in the Far East in general. The city of Harbin is the capital of Heilongjiang Province (formerly Manchuria). Its development as a city began in the late 19th century when the Russian Empire received a concession in 1897 to build a railway in East China, which crossed Manchuria and reached Port Arthur. Harbin was the administrative center of the railway, and the city developed around this center. Harbin was one of the cities with the highest rate of Jewish growth in the world, and it was one of the richest and most intellectual Jewish centers in all of Asia.

The first Jews to arrive in Harbin fled Russia and Eastern Europe due to the increase in anti-Semitism in Europe and the Odessa pogroms. The Jews fled via the Trans-Siberian Railway, which connected Moscow with Beijing. The community was officially established in November 1903, and that year it numbered about five hundred Jews and continued to grow.

On May 3, 1907, the burgeoning Jewish community began construction of a new synagogue, on Artilleriskia Street in the Pristan square (now Unjiang Street, Dauli district). The Zionist movement played a prominent role in the life of the community. Among the Zionist associations operating in the city, the Betar and Maccabi movements were prominent, which also carried out extensive sports activities. Dr. Abraham Kaufman, who was the chairman of the community from 1933 to 1945, headed Zionist activity in the city. He was the chairman of the Keren Hayesod in Harbin, a member of the World Zionist Executive and the Jewish Agency, and the chairman of the Zionist Organization in China. Rabbi Aharon Moshe Kiselev was the rabbi of the local community from 1913 until his death in 1949.

At the end of World War II, under Soviet rule, which lasted about nine months, Zionist activity in the city ceased, many of the Jews then living in Harbin were deported to forced labor camps in Russia, and many Jews left Harbin for other countries (including Israel). In 1963, the institutions of the Jewish community in the city were officially closed, and in 1985, Hanna Agra, the last Jew in the local community, died.
