= Rabbi Einhorn =

Rabbi Einhorn may refer to:

- David Einhorn (rabbi), a leader of the Jewish reformation movement in the US during the 19th century
- Ephraim Einhorn (1918–2021), a rabbi in Taiwan
