= Jakob Rosenfeld =

Austrian physician (1903–1952)

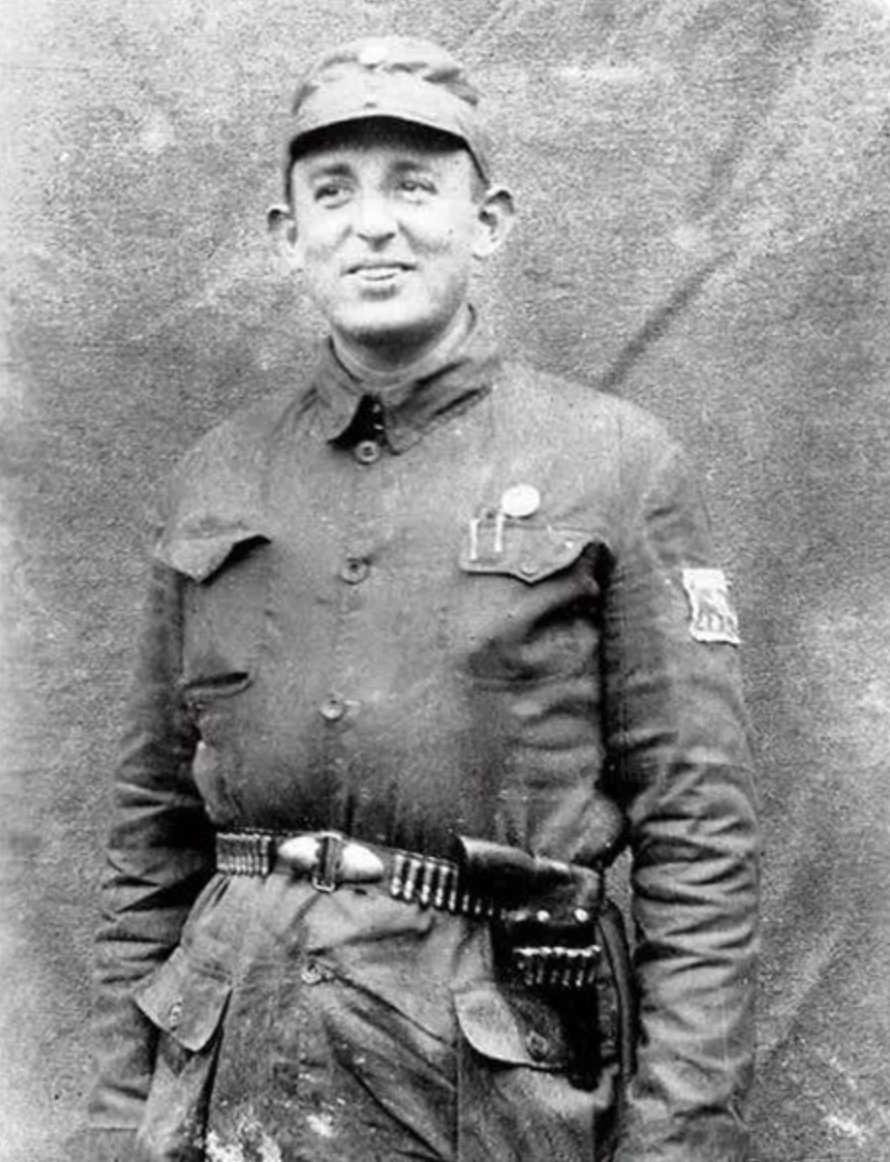
- Rosenfeld in military uniform

Personal details
- Born: 11 January 1903 Lemberg, Kingdom of Galicia and Lodomeria, Austro-Hungarian Empire (now Lviv, Ukraine)
- Died: April 22, 1952 (aged 49) Tel Aviv, Israel
- Resting place: Kiryat Shaul Cemetery; Tel Aviv, Israel
- Education: University of Vienna
- Occupation: Urologist

Jakob Rosenfeld
- Traditional Chinese: 雅各布·羅森菲爾德
- Simplified Chinese: 雅各布·罗森菲尔德
Transcriptions
Standard Mandarin
- Hanyu Pinyin: Yǎgèbù Luósēnfěi'ěrdé

Alternative Chinese name
- Traditional Chinese: 羅生特
- Simplified Chinese: 罗生特
Transcriptions
Standard Mandarin
- Hanyu Pinyin: Luó Shēngtè

Jakob Rosenfeld (Chinese: 雅各布·羅森菲爾德; January 11, 1903 – April 22, 1952), known in China as General Luo or Luo Shengte, was a Holocaust survivor and urologist who fled to Shanghai, China due to the repression he faced in Austria, which had been annexed by Nazi Germany. While in China, he served all around the country as a surgeon and Minister of Health in the Provisional Communist Military Government of China under Mao Zedong during the Japanese invasion of China and the Chinese Civil War. He received a rank equivalent to that of a general.

== Early life ==
Rosenfeld was born to a Jewish family in Lemberg, the Austro-Hungarian Empire (today Lviv, Ukraine) in 1903. He was raised in Wöllersdorf near Wiener Neustadt, where the family lived since 1910. His father, Michael Rosenfeld, worked as an Austro-Hungarian military officer, and then as a hatmaker. His mother, Regina Rosenfeld (née Wohlmann), came from an Orthodox Jewish family. Jakob's parents spoke Polish, German, and Hebrew.

Albeit a Jewish family, the Rosenfelds were not strictly religious and had to cease following kosher dietary rules during the hardship of World War I, without returning to them afterward. Jakob Rosenfeld did receive some Jewish religious study early on. In 1922, Rosenfeld began attending the University of Vienna. He graduated in medicine with a specialization in urology, receiving a doctorate in May 1928.

== Life and career ==
From 1930, he worked at the Vienna General Hospital. The Social Democratic Party of Austria was banned in the coup of 1933. Rosenfeld was a member, and was arrested in February 1934. After his release from jail, he left the Vienna General Hospital and operated his own urology clinic in Vienna instead.

After the Anschluss in 1938, Rosenfeld was deported to Dachau concentration camp in May. He was there for a year, and later sent to Buchenwald concentration camp. While in Buchenwald, he suffered severe injuries from beatings. The Nazis seized Rosenfeld's home in Vienna at this time. His parents both died in the camps at this time, though he did not learn this until years later. In June 1939, he was released on the condition he leave the country in fourteen days. He then returned to Vienna.

Over 20,000 Jewish refugees, including over 400 Jewish doctors and dentists (such as Rosenfeld and Richard Frey), around this time period fled to Shanghai, which was an asylum destination of last resort and later became the site of the Shanghai Ghetto. After release from the camp, Rosenfeld and his brother immediately requested visas from the Chinese legation and travelled to Shanghai, where he arrived in August, receiving visas from Ho Feng-shan. Once in Shanghai he opened a successful practice in urology, gynecology and obstetrics, in the Shanghai French Concession sector of the city.

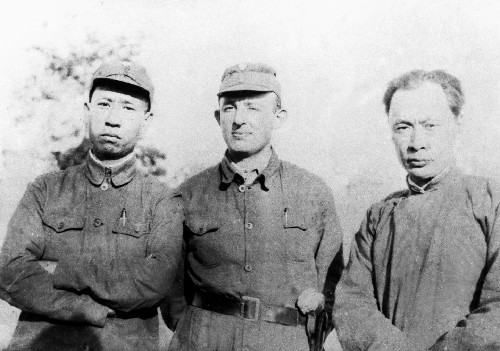
Rosenfeld (center) with Liu Shaoqi on the left, and Chen Yi on the right.

From 1941 he served the Chinese Communist force as a field doctor for the New Fourth Army, the Eighth Route Army and the Northeast People's Liberation Army during the outbreak of Second Sino-Japanese War and Chinese Civil War. During this time he became closely acquainted with Luo Ronghuan and Chen Yi. He became a member of the Chinese Communist Party in 1942. He became a general in the Chinese army.

Rosenfeld acted as a surgeon for injured soldiers, often performing surgery in a small boat. Due to the severe shortage of doctors he founded the Huazhong Medical School, which trained the medical teams for the New Fourth Army. He gave lectures about anatomy, physiology and surgery.

He chose to remain in China after the fall of the Nazi regime and participated in the People's Liberation Army's march on Beijing before returning in November 1949 to Europe to search for relatives, most of whom had perished in the Holocaust.

Rosenfeld reunited with family in Austria and Israel in 1949. In 1950, after unsuccessfully attempting to return to China, he emigrated to Israel and was reunited with his younger brother Joseph. He then worked at a hospital in Tel Aviv. He died two years later at age 49, in 1952, after suffering from a heart attack.

== Legacy ==
In 2003, his 100th birthday was celebrated in China and a stamp was issued commemorating Rosenfeld. Hu Jintao said, "As a shining example of China-Austrian friendship, he and his achievements will live on..."

China erected a statue in his honour, at a hospital called Rosenfeld Hospital in Junan County, Shandong which was named after him. Shandong is the area he worked as a field doctor. In Junan County there is also an exhibition hall called the Deeds of International Fighter Rosenfeld.

In 2006 a large exhibit was mounted in Beijing's National Museum of China in tribute to him. The museum exhibit in his honor was inaugurated by Chinese President Hu Jintao. The Shanghai Jewish Refugees Museum also highlights his life.

A bronze memorial (from 1993) at the entrance of Unfallkrankenhaus (UKH) hospital in Graz, Austria depicts Rosenfeld. A park in Vienna was named after him in 2006, and the same year an exhibit about him designed by Gerd Kaminski was placed in the Jewish Museum Vienna.

He is buried in Kiryat Shaul Cemetery on the outskirts of Tel Aviv. Since China–Israel relations were reestablished in 1992, a Chinese delegation has visited his grave annually.

== See also ==
- History of the Jews in China
- China–Israel relations
- Austria–China relations
