= Ephraim Einhorn =

British Orthodox rabbi in Taiwan (1918–2021)

Rabbi Ephraim Ferdinand Einhorn (Hebrew: אפרים פרדיננד איינהורן; Chinese: 艾恩宏; pinyin: Ài Ēnhóng; 12 September 1918 – 15 September 2021) was a British Orthodox rabbi affiliated with the Taiwan Jewish Community.

== Early years ==
Einhorn was born in Vienna, Austria. He moved to the United Kingdom at age 14 and later to the United States. Einhorn's parents were killed in the Sachsenhausen concentration camp.

== Synagogue services in Taiwan ==
Einhorn arrived in Taiwan in January 1975 from Kuwait and started administering Jewish prayer services five years later. Einhorn operated a Synagogue service with the Taiwan Jewish Community. Although Jews in Taiwan never had a physical synagogue built (unlike fellow communities such as China, Hong Kong, and Singapore), the first temporary synagogue was created in the 1950s at the United States military chapel when U.S. soldiers were stationed there. After the breakdown in Republic of China–United States relations and the Taiwan Relations Act passed, prayer services were moved to the President Hotel, which no longer exists, and then for many years at the Landis (formerly Ritz) Hotel. The Taiwan Jewish Community services are now held in a dedicated space funded by the community.

== Other career highlights ==
Along with religious duties, Einhorn helped to achieve and promote diplomatic relations between the Taiwanese government and the Eastern and Central Europe countries such as the Czech Republic, Hungary, Latvia, Lithuania, Poland and Romania as well as North Macedonia and Ukraine. He was also a former chairman of the Republicans Abroad Taiwan.

In 2009 the Austrian government awarded him the Grand Decoration of Honour for Services to the Republic of Austria.

== Personal life ==
He married Ruth Weinberg in 1953, and they had two daughters, Daphna and Sharone.

Einhorn died in Taipei on 15 September 2021, three days after his 103rd birthday.

== See also ==
- History of the Jews in Taiwan
