= Xu Xin (Judaic scholar) =

Xu Xin (徐新)
- Born: 16 June 1949 (age 77)
- Citizenship: China
- Scientific career
- Fields: Religious studies, Judaic studies
- Workplaces: Nanjing University

Xu Xin (Chinese: 徐新; pinyin: Xú Xīn; born June 16, 1949) is a professor at Nanjing University and China's leading Judaic scholar, as well as the founder and director of the Diane and Guilford Glazer Institute for Jewish and Israel Studies at Nanjing University in Nanjing, China.

Until 1986, he taught mostly English and American literature with a focus on American Jewish authors. Since 1986, he has focused on the study of Judaism, Jewish culture, and the history of Chinese Jews.

== Education and professional life ==
Xu was born in Jinan (Shandong province) in 1949 and graduated from Nanjing University in 1977 as an English major. He became a faculty member the same year. Until 1986, he taught post-World War II English and American literature with a focus on American Jewish authors. His interest in American Jewish authors began when Saul Bellow won the Nobel Prize in Literature in 1976 and Isaac Bashevis Singer in 1978.

In 1986, while teaching a course on American Jewish authors, he met a Jew for the first time: Professor James Friend, chair of the English Department at Chicago State University in Chicago, who had come to teach in Nanjing for a semester. Friend invited Xu to be an exchange professor at Chicago State. While there, Xu lived with the Friend family (in Lincolnwood, Illinois) and began to study Judaism seriously. He visited Israel on his way back to China in 1988, when there were no diplomatic relations between Israel and China.

Upon his return to Nanjing, he discovered that he got a larger audience when he lectured about his three weeks in Israel than when he talked about his two-year stay in the United States. Seeing the need to disseminate information about Israel and Jewish culture, Xu engaged scholars to work on an abridged Chinese translation of the Encyclopedia Judaica, which he edited. The publisher wanted a $10,000 subsidy for the work, which was raised by donations in the U.S. The book sold out upon publication and a second edition was printed. When China and Israel opened diplomatic relations in 1992, the Chinese government purchased copies for diplomats assigned to Israel. Chinese Jewish families in Kaifeng as well as the religious studies departments of many universities also received copies.

Xu was tenured as full professor in 1994. His small-scale class on Judaism (which he originally taught in English) has developed into a multi-level curriculum attended by hundreds of students. Xu has also created MA and PhD programs on Jewish history and culture. All the doctoral candidates spend a year studying in Israel and graduates of the program have begun centers for Judaic Studies at other universities throughout China.

== Publications ==
He is editor of the Chinese edition of Encyclopaedia Judaica (Shanghai: The Shanghai People's Publishing House, 1993), Legends of the Chinese Jews of Kaifeng (with Beverly Friend, KTAV Publishing House, Inc., 1995), Anti-Semitism: How and Why (Shanghai Shanlian Books, 1996), A History of Western Culture (Peking University Press, 2002), and The Jews of Kaifeng, China: History, Culture, and Religion (KTAV Publishing House, Inc., 2003), A History of Jewish Culture (Peking University Press, 2006) and On Jewish Culture (2013, World Publication Company Guangdong Branch). He has also written numerous articles on Judaic topics.

He was the first Chinese scholar to introduce modern Hebrew literature to Chinese readers and has introduced over 50 Israeli poets and writers to the Chinese public in the 1990s. He is also a translator of many books that were published in English. Works he translated into Chinese include:

- Ten Green Bottles by Vivian Jeanette Kaplan (Yilin Press, 2014)
- The Years of Extermination: Nazi Germany and the Jews, 1939-1945 by Saul Friedländer (China Youth Press, 2011)
- Selected Reading of Great Jewish Thought (Beijing: Central Compilation & Translation Press, 2006)
- The Defiant: A True Story, by Shalom Yoran, (East China Normal University Press, 2005)
- The American Jew, 1585-1990: A History, by Jacob Rader Marcus (Shanghai People's Publishing House, 2004)
- Israel 2000 Years: A History of People and Place, ed. by David Arnon (Shandong Picture Publishing House, 2003)
- Duden Atlas of Jewish History, by Martin Gilbert (Shanghai People's Publishing House, 2000)
- Ahad Ha'am, Bible, and Bible Tradition, by Alfred Gottschalk (Inner Mongolia People's Publishing House, 1999)
- Anthology of Modern Hebrew Short Stories (Lijiang Publishing House, 1992)
- In the Heart of the Seas, by S.Y. Agnon (Contemporary Foreign Literature, No.2, 1990)
- Tender Is the Night, by F. Scott Fitzgerald (Shanxi Publishing House, 1987)
- Cranford, by Elizabeth Gaskell (Hundred Flowers Art and Literature Press, 1985)

He served as a visiting professor and taught various college courses at Chicago State University (1986–88), Florida Community College in Jacksonville (1999), and Montclair State University (2001). He was a guest speaker at Hebrew University of Jerusalem in 1988 and at Tel Aviv University (1993 and 1998). In 1995, he served as a Fellow at Hebrew Union College—Jewish Institute of Religion. In 1996 and 1998, he served as a visiting scholar at the Center for Jewish Studies of Harvard University.

In the past 20 years, he has been invited to the U.S. 13 times, and has delivered over 500 lectures in the United States, Israel, Canada, and Great Britain, in institutions which included Harvard University, Yeshiva University, Yale University, University of Chicago, Boston University, Brandeis University, University of Pennsylvania, UCLA, Stanford University, Princeton University, City University of New York, York University, Northeastern University, Northwestern University, Brown University, Emory University, University of Southern California (USC), Miami International University, the University of Colorado at Denver, University of Wyoming, The Hebrew University of Jerusalem, Bar-Ilan University, Tel Aviv University, Haifa University, Ben-Gurion University, University of Toronto, McMaster University, University of Montreal, and various Jewish organizations and institutions.

He also launched 12 Nanjing testimonies at the USC Shoah Foundation, an organization dedicated to making audio-visual interviews with survivors and witnesses of the Holocaust and other genocides.

== Tours and seminars ==
He has led numerous Jewish heritage tours from the US, Israel, the Great Britain, Australia, Canada, and France to Jewish sites in China including Kaifeng (with its biblical history), Harbin (where Jews fled the Russian pogroms at the turn of the 20th century) and Shanghai (where Jews fled the Nazi Holocaust). In addition, he has run three-week summer seminars for Chinese scholars and graduate students from departments of history and western civilization at other universities to enable them to incorporate material on Judaism into their current classes.

His activities have been widely reported by such newspapers and magazines as Chicago Tribune, Jerusalem Post, New York Times, Harvard University Gazette, The Jerusalem Report, The Jewish Week, The Forward, China's Talents, Xinhua Daily, Modern Express, and China Daily.

== Awards ==
Xu Xin was awarded a Special Government Allowance by the State Council of the People's Republic of China in 1996. The Chinese edition of the Encyclopaedia Judaica won an award of Excellent Book by Bureau of Press and Publication of Shanghai and East China in 1994, and an award of Excellent Reference Book by General Administration of Press and Publication of the People's Republic of China in 1995. Xu's essay on "Modern Hebrew Literature" won a Second Place of Excellent essays on Social Sciences by the Bureau of Higher Education of Jiangsu province in 1994. His book, A History of Western Culture, was named as National Planned Textbook in 2006 for Chinese colleges. In 1995, his book Legends of the Chinese Jews of Kaifeng was named a Sydney Taylor Book Award Notable Book for Older Readers.

Xu has won five titles of Excellent Teacher Award from Nanjing University since 1994.

In 1995, he was honored with the "James Friend Memorial Award." In 2002, Bar-Ilan University's Board of Trustees and the Senate of Israel awarded him the degree of Doctor of Philosophy, Honoris Causa in recognition of the important research he has done on Jewish people in China.

He is a member of a number of academic organizations in China, such as Jiangsu Writers' Association, the Association of All-China Comparative Literature, the Association of Translators of Jiangsu, and the Society of World History Studies of China. Currently he serves as President of the China Judaic Studies Association and vice-president of China Association for Middle East Studies.
