= Klara Blum =

Chinese Writer

Klara Chaje Blum (simplified Chinese: 朱白兰; traditional Chinese: 朱白蘭; pinyin: Zhū Báilán; November 27, 1904 – May 5, 1971) was a Chinese writer who wrote in German.

== Early life and education ==
Klara Blum was born in 1904 to a Jewish family in Chernivtsi, in what is now Ukraine but at the time was controlled by Austria-Hungary. Her father, Josef Blum, was a landowner and local politician. He began to clash with her mother, Cipre Maschler Kaner, who was 26 years his junior and became empowered by the early feminist movement to challenge his authority; the two eventually divorced in 1913.

Around that time, as World War I began, 9-year-old Klara and her mother fled to Vienna. She later sought a Romanian passport, as her hometown had come under Romanian control, but she primarily lived in Vienna to care for her ailing mother.

After graduating high school in 1922, Blum undertook university studies in literature and psychology, but she likely did not complete them due to financial struggles.

== Career beginnings in Vienna ==
In the 1920s, Blum began writing poetry, as well as articles for such Jewish publications as the Ostjüdische Zeitung and Czernowitzer Allgemeine Zeitung. An active Zionist in this period, she migrated to Palestine in 1929, but she left shortly after, dissatisfied with her experience. After many years as a Zionist, she would turn away from the movement in her later years, writing in her will of "the disgrace that the state of Israel, this tool of U.S. imperialism, has brought upon my people."

After three years as a member of the Austrian Social Democratic Party in the early 1930s, in which time she wrote for such Viennese publications as the Arbeiter-Zeitung, she shifted her sympathies to the Communist Party, though she did not formally join.

== Soviet exile ==
After Hitler's rise to power, Blum was awarded a two-month fellowship in the Soviet Union for a poem she wrote in 1934, and she used the opportunity to settle in the country for what would become 11 years. She gained Soviet citizenship in 1935. While there, she wrote and translated literary works and reviews for the journal International Literature and other publications.

In 1939, she published the poetry collections Die Antwort in Moscow and Erst Becht! in Kyiv. Her other German-language poetry collections in this period included Wir entscheiden alles (1941), Donauballaden (1942), and Schlachtfeld and Erdball (1944).

== Move to China ==
In 1937, Blum began a love affair with the Chinese communist activist and journalist Zhu Xiangcheng (born 1901), whom she had met in Moscow. The two lost contact the following year, after spending only four months together, and while Zhu was thought to be dead, Blum was convinced he was still out there, working for the revolution. So when World War II ended and German exiles in the Soviet Union began to disperse, Blum headed for China in an effort to locate her lost love. After significant difficulty obtaining a visa, she arrived in China in August 1947 with the assistance of the Shanghai Jewish Rescue Committee.

Settling in Shanghai, she began teaching the following year at Tongji University, learning to lecture in Chinese, although she would have to leave the position after less than a year. She continued to search to no avail for Zhu, declaring herself her lover's "wife." Records later revealed, toward the end of Blum's life, that Zhu had died in a Siberian labor camp in 1943.

While in China, Blum continued to write poetry and fiction, which often touched on Chinese themes and echoed Chinese literary styles. In 1949, she produced the autobiographical novel The Shepherd and the Weaver (Der Hirte und die Weberin), which was published in East Germany in 1951. Her other works in this period include the collection of five novellas Das Lied von Hongkong (1959) and the unpublished 1962 autobiographical novel Die Schicksalsüberwinder ("Overcomer of Fate").

Blum is thought to be the only Jewish female poet of Chinese nationality to compose in German. Though she moved away from Jewish religiosity, she still identified strongly as a Jewish person throughout her life.

In her later career, she also worked as a translator; she had previously translated from Russian to German while still in the Soviet Union. In China, she translated poetry by Mao Zedong from Chinese to German. She also continued to publish German-language articles in East Germany. Starting in 1952, she became a German professor at Shanghai's Fudan University. She later left Shanghai after fighting with a fellow European professor, and beginning in 1957 she taught at Guangzhou's Zhangshan University.

Blum obtained Chinese citizenship on June 21, 1954. She adopted the Chinese name Zhu Bailan, taking her lost lover's family name and choosing a personal name meaning "white orchid."

== Death and legacy ==
Klara Blum died of liver disease in 1971, at age 67, in Guangzhou.

In 2008, a street in Vienna was renamed Klara Blum Gasse in her honor. Her novel Der Hirte und die Weberin, considered her most important work, was re-published in Germany in 2023.
