= Bombay Jews =

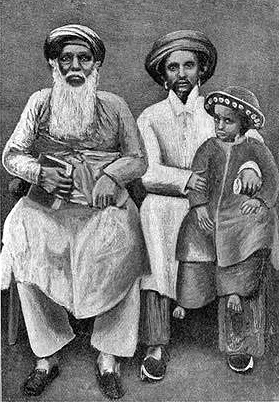
19th century Bene Israel

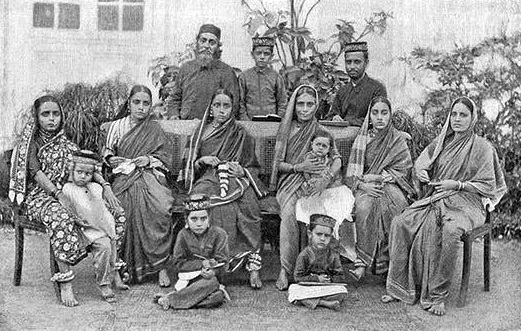
Bene Israel in Bombay

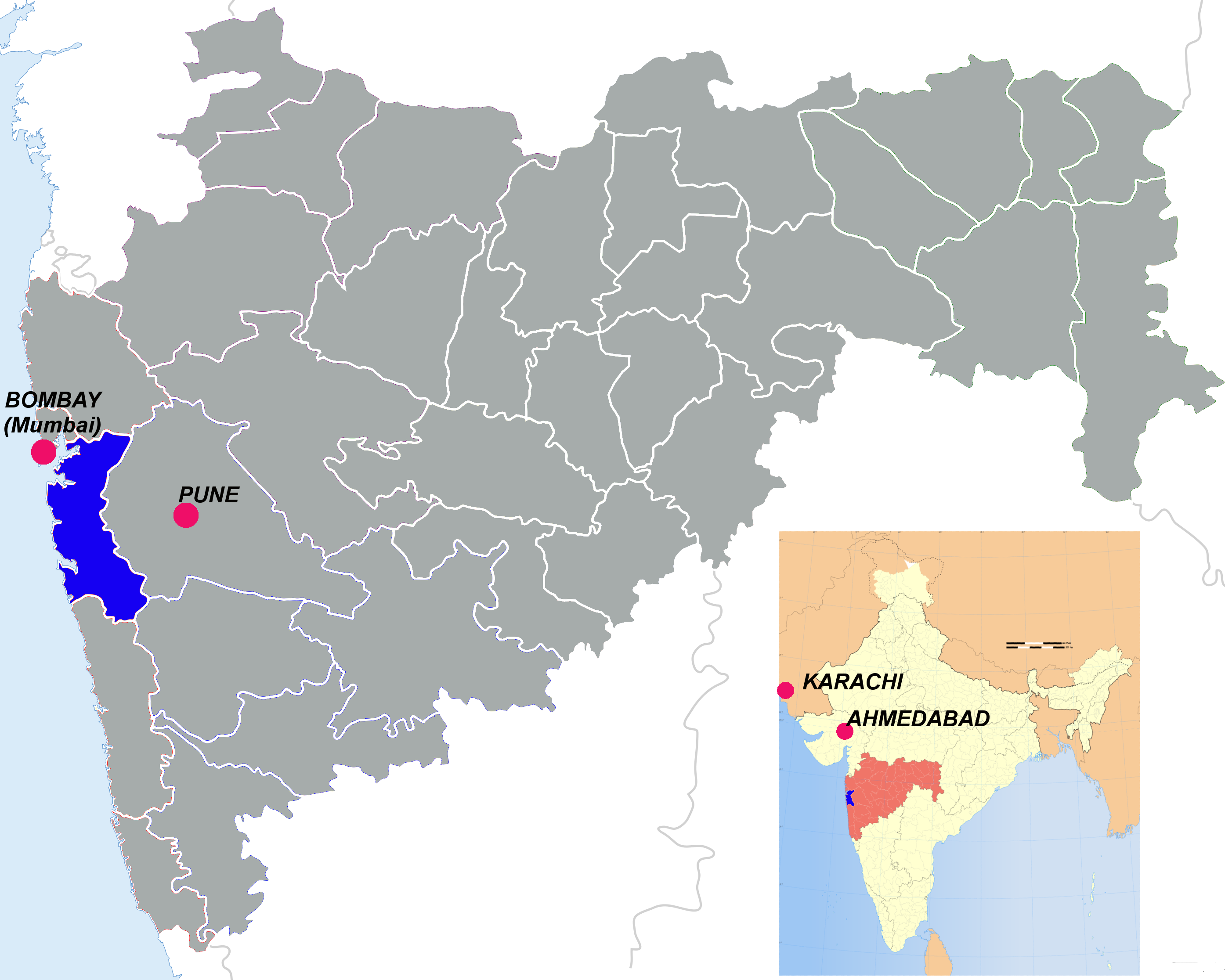

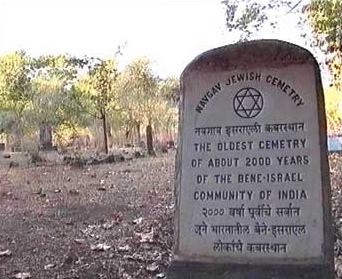
A Bene Israel cemetery in Bombay

Jews started settling in Bombay in the 2nd century. The Jewish community of Bombay consisted of three distant groups, the Bene Israeli Jews, the Baghdadi Jews, and the Cochin Jews.

The Bene Israeli Jewish community of Bombay, who migrated from the Konkan villages, south of Bombay, are believed to be the descendants of the Jews of Israel who were shipwrecked off the Konkan coast, probably in the year 175 BCE, during the reign of the Greek ruler, Antiochus IV Epiphanes. Following the pogroms of Daud Pasha of Baghdad, many Baghdadi Jews fled Iraq, and settled in Bombay.

== Culture ==
The Bene Israeli Jewish community of Bombay speak the Marathi language, an Indo-Aryan language spoken in the state of Maharashtra in India.
