= Aharon Moshe Kiselev =

Russian-born Manchurian rabbi

- Title: Chief Rabbi of Harbin

Personal life
- Born: 18 September 1866 Surazh, Russian Empire
- Died: 9 September 1949 (aged 82) Harbin, Soviet Zone
- Education: Volozhin Yeshiva

Religious life
- Religion: Judaism
- Began: 1913
- Ended: 1949
- Other: Chief Rabbi of the Far East 1937-1949
- Semikhah: Rabbi Chaim Ozer Grodzinski

Aharon Moshe Kiselev (1866–1949) was a Russian-born Manchurian rabbi.

== Early life ==
Kiselev was born in Surazh, Chernigov district. In his youth, he excelled in his studies, and was known as the “Vietker Illui”. He later studied in Minsk, and in Volozhin under the tutelage of Rabbi Chaim Soloveitchik. He was the rabbi of Barysaw from 1900 to 1913.

== Harbin ==
In 1913, he was appointed chief rabbi of Harbin, and tasked with overseeing Jewish cultural, educational, and social activities.

In 1915, detractors of Kiselev reported his efforts to aid German refugees in Harbin as collaboration with the enemy. He was detained for 2 months.

Following the death of the notorious bandit kingpin Ataman Woliewski, it was discovered that he had been planning to abduct Kiselev, with the hope of exacting a large ransom from the Jewish community.

In December 1937, at the first annual Far Eastern Jewish Conference, he was declared ‘Chief Rabbi of the Far East’.

As leader of the Harbin chapter of Agudas Chasidei Chabad, Kiselev assisted many wartime Jewish refugees who had fled German-occupied Europe.

== Works ==
- Mishberei Yam [The waves of the sea] (1926) - a collection of responsa.
- Natsionalizm i evreistvo: Sbornik statei i lektsii [Nationalism and the Jewry: Collection of articles and lectures] (1941) - a Russian-language compendium on Jewish nationalism.
- Imrei Shefer [Sayings by an author] (1951) - a compilation of sermons posthumously published by his widow.

== See also ==
- Abraham Kaufman
- History of the Jews in China
