= UCL Institute of Jewish Studies =

Academic institute in London, England

Coordinates: 51.52308°N 0.13242°W

- Established: 1954
- Location: London, England
- Website: UCL Institute of Jewish Studies

The UCL Institute of Jewish Studies is an institute located in London, England, dedicated to the academic study of all branches of Jewish history and civilization. It is a privately funded institute within the Department of Hebrew and Jewish Studies at University College London (UCL), the largest department of Hebrew and Jewish studies in Europe.

The institute is located at the main UCL campus in Bloomsbury, close to the British Library, the Wiener Library, the Warburg Institute, Dr Williams's Library, the library of the School of Oriental and African Studies and the UCL Jewish Studies Collection, which houses the Moccatta Library, the Altman Collection and a substantial collection of unique Yiddish material. The staff and students are mostly Jewish, unlike other UK faculties for Jewish studies in the UK.

== History ==
The institute was founded by Alexander Altmann in Manchester in 1954 as the Institute of Jewish Studies. In 1959, following the departure of Altmann as director, the institute moved to UCL.

Altmann's justification for the activities of the institute was given in a 1957 lecture to the Hillel Foundation of London (Ivry, Wolfson & Arkush 1998):

Being connected with our past, at home in our literature, and in sympathy with ourselves as it were, we shall find it easier to approach the ultimate questions.

Victor Mishcon became chairman of the institute in 1959.

== Activities ==
=== Events ===
The institute organises public lectures, symposia and seminars throughout the academic year, where leading scholars from Europe, Israel and the United States communicate the results of their research to scholars, students and the public, thereby creating the opportunity for regular exchange of ideas and interests.

The institute also hosts one or more major international conferences annually, which focus on significant themes relating to Jewish civilisation, and bring together eminent scholars from different countries working in the same or allied fields of research.

=== Research ===
The institute regularly sponsors research projects by postgraduates and scholars in important academic fields.

=== Publications ===
The institute sponsors the publication of its conference proceedings and other academic works in co-operation with publishers, including Cambridge University Press, Oxford University Press, and the Littman Library of Jewish Civilisation.

== See also ==
- Institute of Jewish Studies (Nanjing)
