= Zhao Yingcheng =

Chinese-Jewish philosopher and mandarin

Chinese name
- Traditional Chinese: 趙映乘
- Simplified Chinese: 赵映乘
Transcriptions
Standard Mandarin
- Hanyu Pinyin: Zhào Yìngchéng
- Wade–Giles: Chao^{4} Ying^{4}-ch'eng^{2}

Hebrew name
- Hebrew: מֹשֶׁה בֶּן־אַבְרָהָם

Zhao Yingcheng (Chinese: 趙映乘; Hebrew name: Moshe ben Avraham; 1619 – c. 1663) was a Chinese-Jewish philosopher and mandarin of the Ming dynasty. He and his brother Zhao Yingdou, also a mandarin, held important government posts in the 1660s.

== Life and career ==
Born to a Jewish family in the province of Henan, Zhao became proficient in both Hebrew and Chinese and obtained the jinshi degree in 1646. He was named director of the Ministry of Justice. Four years later he was sent to Fujian and Huguang as an official. He was remembered as an efficient administrator and excellent Confucian scholar who exterminated local bandits and founded schools.

In 1642, near the end of the Ming Dynasty, Kaifeng was flooded by the Ming army with water from the Yellow River to prevent the peasant rebel Li Zicheng from taking over. After this disaster, the city was abandoned. The synagogue of the Kaifeng Jewish community (reportedly dating from 1163) was destroyed, and the Jews took refuge on the north side of the Yellow River. They took with them the Torah scrolls, which had been saved after having been thrown into the river, though they had grown moldy and illegible.

Ten years later, Zhao was detailed to restore the city. With the aid of his brother, Zhao Yingdou (趙映斗), he induced the Jews to recross the river and take up their old quarters. The temple was rebuilt in 1653, with the personal financial support of Zhao. One complete scroll of the Law was made up out of the fragments which had been saved from the river, and other copies were made from this. A stone stele dated 1663 was afterward erected, giving the details of Zhao Yingcheng's action.

Zhao wrote an account of the saving of the scrolls and the rebuilding of the temple, Record of the Vicissitudes of the Holy Scriptures. His brother wrote Preface to the Illustrious Way, believed to be an exposition of the tenets of Judaism. Both works are now lost, although in recent years Chinese scholars have begun a search for them in the libraries of Kaifeng, Beijing, and elsewhere.

All known descendants of Zhao are recorded to have perished from dysentery by the 17th century.
