= History of the Jews in Taiwan =

Taiwanese Jews
在臺猶太人 יהודי טייוואן

Regions with significant populations
- Major populations in Taipei, also in Kaohsiung, Hsinchu, Taichung

Languages
- English, Hebrew, Mandarin

Religion
- Judaism

Related ethnic groups
- East Asian Jews; Jewish diaspora

The history of the Jews in Taiwan dates back to the mid-20th century. The first sizable presence began in the 1950s, when religious services were held in the United States military chapel, to which civilians also had access.

Currently, there are two synagogues in Taiwan. The Taiwan Jewish Community, which has been in Taiwan since the 1950s, and Chabad Taiwan, which began in 2011 and is also known by the name Taipei Jewish Center.

== History ==
The presence of Jews in Taiwan can be traced back to the mid-20th century when a small number of Jewish individuals and families arrived on the island. Most Jewish immigrants came to Taiwan for business and professional opportunities, attracted by the growing economic development and trade possibilities in the region.

In June 2026, Taiwan's first dedicated Jewish cemetery opened, allowing Jewish burials to take place locally rather than requiring the deceased to be transported abroad. The cemetery was established through the local Chabad, and members of the Jewish burial society in Hong Kong assisted with its first burial.

== Institutions ==
=== Taiwan Jewish Community ===
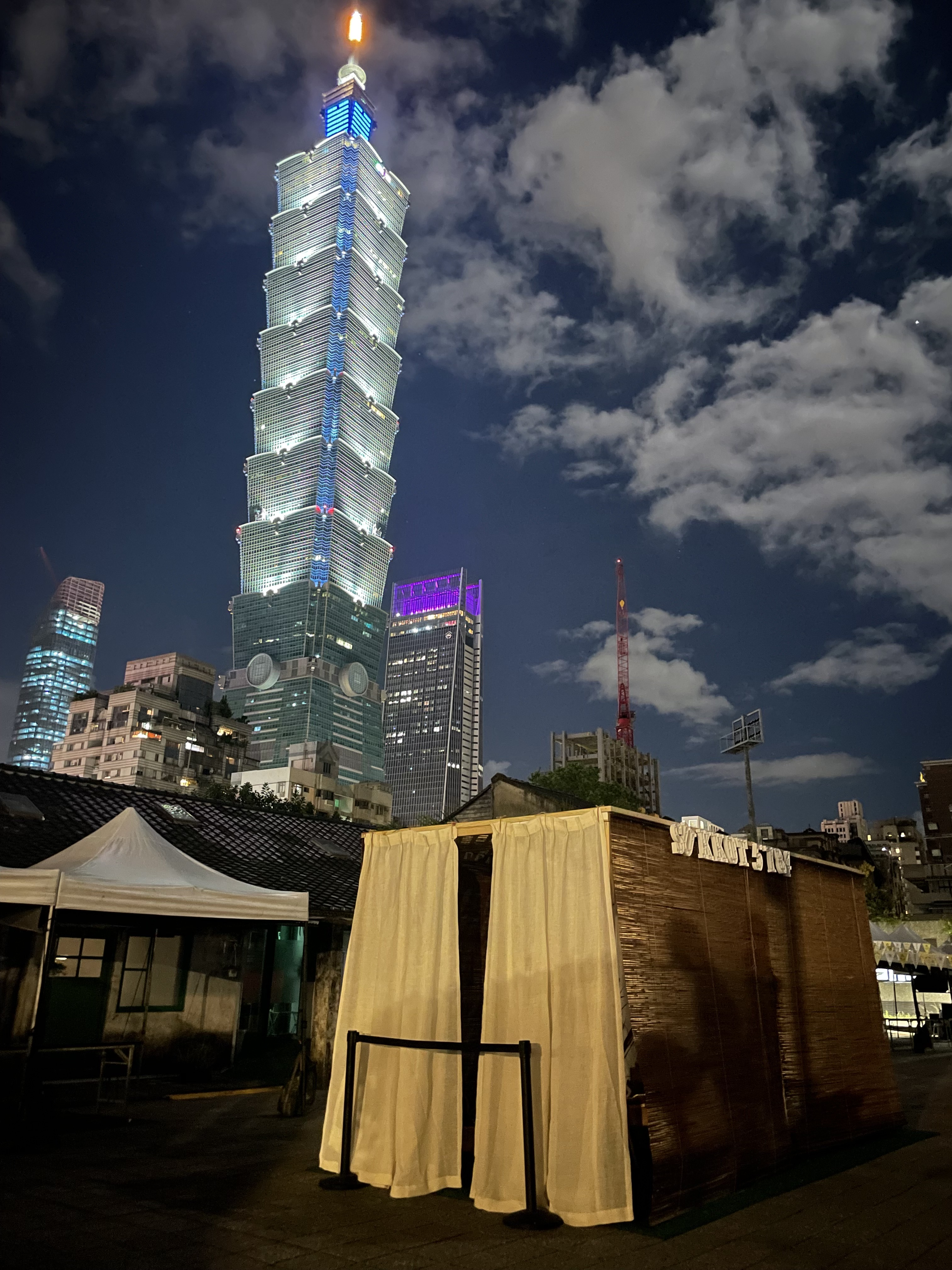
Taiwan Jewish Community's 2023 Sukkah across from Taipei 101

The Taiwan Jewish Community (TJC) is a non-denominational Jewish community in Taipei. During the 1950s, Jews in Taiwan would meet at the American military chapel. Expecting their support from the American military to end, they applied with the Taipei city government to register a Jewish foundation. This application was approved in 1978, officially establishing the Taiwan Jewish Community. In 1975, Rabbi Ephraim Einhorn (Hebrew: אפרים פרדיננד איינהורן; Chinese: 艾恩宏; pinyin: Ài Ēnhóng) arrived to serve as the island's sole rabbi. For many years Rabbi Einhorn officiated at Sabbath and holiday services at the Landis Hotel and later the Sheraton Taipei. In 2015 the venue for the services moved to space in an office building provided by one of the community members. In 2020 the Taiwan Jewish Community moved to a location funded by the entire community. Attendance peaks around the High Holy Days, numbering around 200 individuals. Rabbi Einhorn died in 2021 in Taipei and his role in running the organization Taiwan Jewish Community was passed on to Leon Fenster. In 2023 until 2025, Cody R. Bahir joined the Taiwanese Jewish Community as the congregation's first full-time rabbi, and Taiwan's first non-orthodox rabbi.

=== Jeffrey D. Schwartz Jewish Community Center of Taiwan ===
On December 29, 2021, the Jeffrey D. Schwartz Jewish Community Center of Taiwan was officially opened in Taipei. The 22,500 square-foot center features a synagogue, mikveh (ritual bath), kosher culinary lab and kitchen, 300-person ballroom, classroom, library, and a museum of Judaica and Jewish art containing over 400 rare items. The center was funded, designed, and built by the Jeffrey D. Schwartz & NaTang Jewish Taiwan Cultural Association (JTCA), a non-profit organization founded by Jeffrey D. Schwartz, Founder and CEO of Four Star Group, and his wife Na Tang, an actress, musician, and author. The center offers a variety of cultural activities and is open to membership and participation by everyone in the Taiwan community, including those who adhere to other faiths.

=== Chabad Taiwan ===
In the summer of 2011, upon the coming of the new Chabad emissaries, Rabbi Shlomi and Racheli Tabib, the Chabad Taiwan was founded.

== Interfaith and Cultural Exchange ==
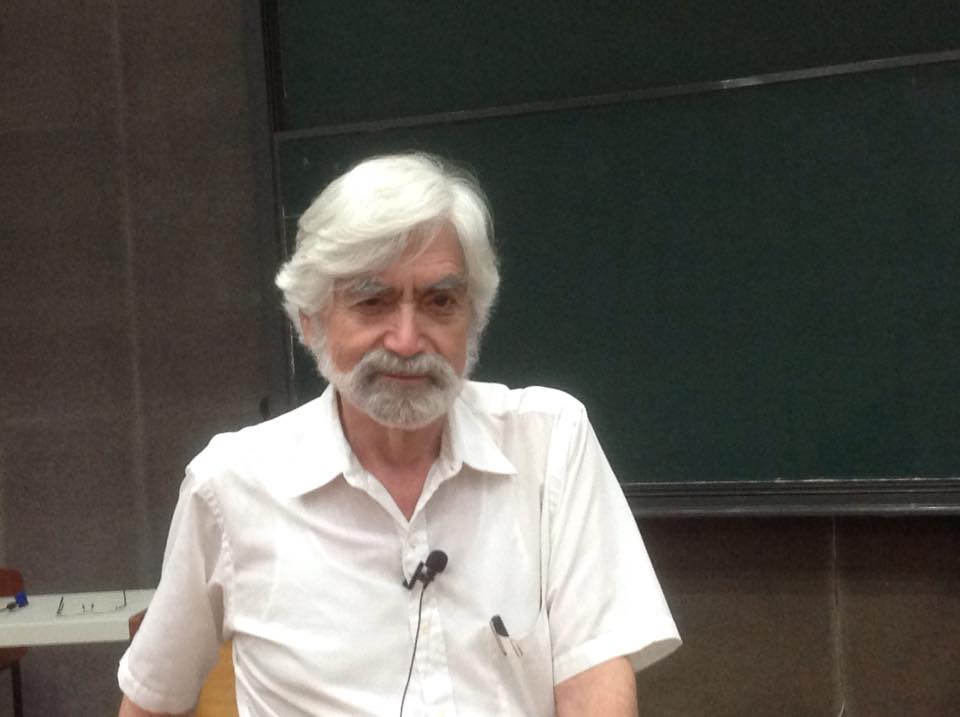
Jewish physicist George Zweig teaching at National Taiwan University.

=== Relations with Israel ===
Because the state of Israel has full diplomatic relations with mainland China, it cannot fully recognize the government of Taiwan, which China considers separatist. Nevertheless, Israel maintains the Israel Economic and Cultural Office in Taipei (ISECO). In 2006, there was $1.3 billion worth of bilateral trade between Israel and Taiwan.

In 2023 Ashkenazi Chief Rabbi of Israel David Lau visited Taiwan by invitation of Rabbi Shlomi Tabib to attend the opening of the new Jeffrey Schwartz Jewish Center.

=== Holocaust remembrance in Taiwan ===
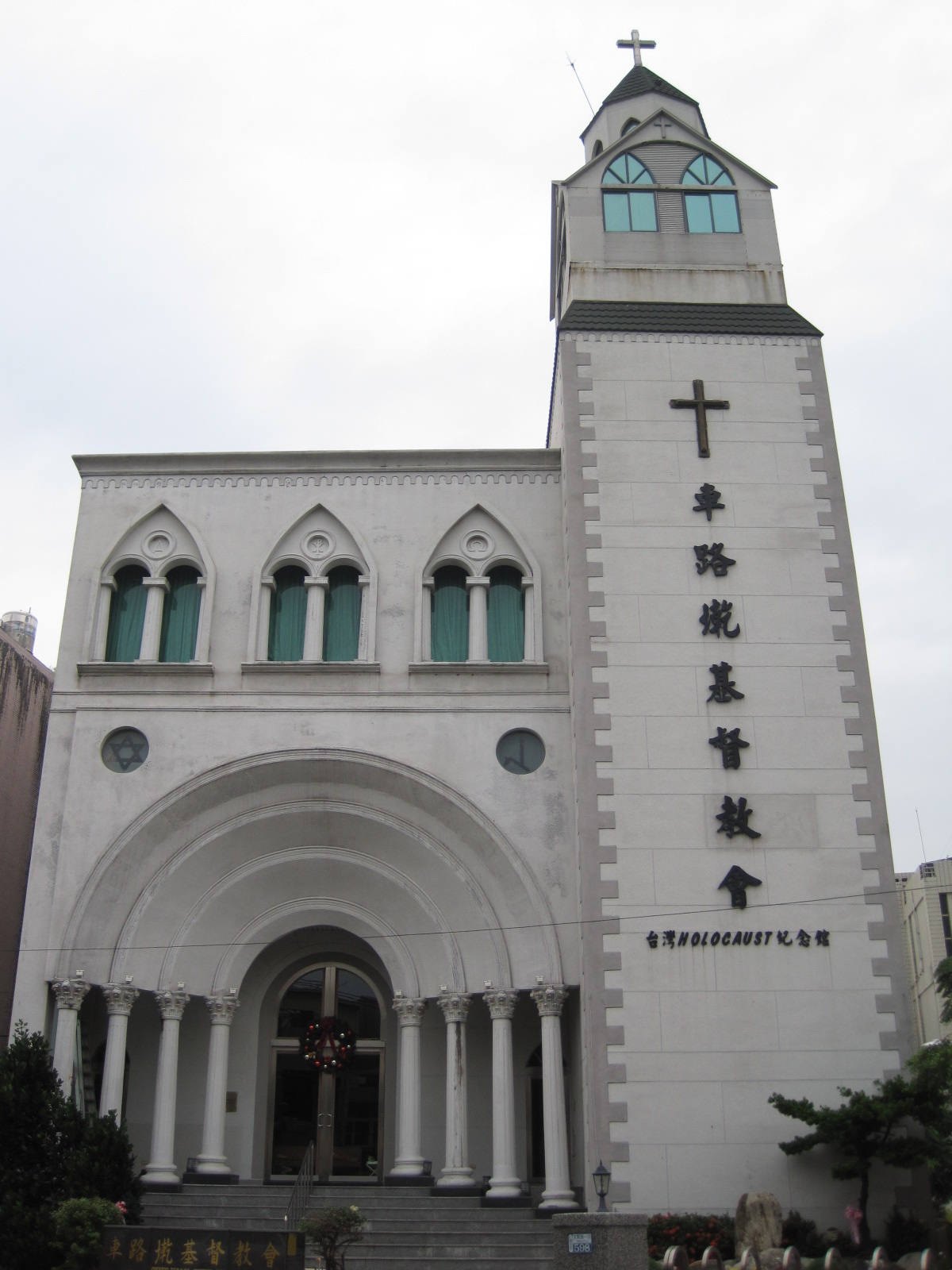
Chelujan Church (車路墘基督教會), site of the Taiwan Holocaust Museum.

In 2002 a Holocaust Museum was opened in Bao'an, Rende Township, Tainan County (now part of Tainan City). It was founded by Chou Chou An (Chinese: 卓枝安; pinyin: Zhuó Zhī'ān), a Taiwanese priest who follows Messianic Judaism, considered by many Christians and Jews to be a form of Christianity. Chou Chou An received his religious education in Japan. The Kyoto Holocaust Museum has donated several artefacts to the Holocaust Museum in Tainan.

In 2021 an International Holocaust Remembrance Day ceremony in Taipei was attended by Taiwanese President Tsai Ing-wen. The event was organized by the Israel Economic and Cultural Office in Taipei, the German Institute Taipei, and the Taiwan Foundation for Democracy.

== Population ==
As of 2023, the Jewish community is estimated to number 1500 to 2000, according to Chabad of Taiwan.

== Notable individuals ==
- Ephraim Einhorn: spiritual leader of Taipei's Jewish community

== See also ==
- Israel–Taiwan relations
- Jerome A. Cohen
