= Diane and Guilford Glazer Institute of Jewish Studies =

- Established: 1992
- Director: Xu Xin
- Location: Nanjing, Jiangsu, China
- Affiliations: Nanjing University
- Website: www.nju.edu.cn/EN/8c/3b/c7549a166971/page.htm

The Diane and Guilford Glazer Institute of Jewish Studies, formerly the Institute of Jewish Studies, is a center devoted to Judaic studies in Nanjing, China. It is associated with the Department of Religious Studies of Nanjing University.

The institute was founded in May 1992, a few months after the establishment of diplomatic relations between Israel and the People's Republic of China in January of that year. It offers courses in Jewish studies which now enroll over 200 students each year, has published a one-volume Chinese version of the Encyclopaedia Judaica, and other publications. It has now established both masters and Ph.D. program in Jewish studies, the only Chinese institution to do so. It held an International Seminar on Holocaust and Genocide in World War II on August 7–12, 2005, in Nanjing.

It was given its present name after the construction of a quarters for it from the Diane and Guilford Glazer Foundation in a new building at the university in 2006. It is planned that it will become part of a larger Nanjing University–Johns Hopkins University Institute for International Research.

The director is Professor Xu Xin.

== See also ==
- UCL Institute of Jewish Studies
