= China–Israel relations =

- China: Israel

Diplomatic mission
- Embassy of China, Tel Aviv: Embassy of Israel, Beijing

Envoy
- Ambassador Cai Run: Ambassador Irit Ben-Abba

The People's Republic of China (PRC) and the State of Israel formally established diplomatic relations in 1992. While the Republic of China had de jure recognized Israeli sovereignty in 1949, it eventually lost the Chinese Civil War, bringing the Chinese Communist Party (CCP) to power across mainland China. In 1950, Israel became the first country in the Middle East to recognize the PRC as the sole government of China, but the CCP did not reciprocate by establishing diplomatic ties due to Israel's alignment with the Western Bloc during the Cold War. This discontent persisted until the Cold War came to a close with the dissolution of the Soviet Union in 1991.

As of 2024, China is Israel's second largest trading partner globally and its largest trading partner in East Asia. Israel has traded significantly with China in technology and arms.

The relations between the two countries have been complicated by China's support for the Palestinians and close relations with Iran, both involved in ongoing conflicts with Israel, and the geopolitical rivalry between China and the United States, Israel's primary security guarantor. In the United Nations, China has long voted in support of Palestine and against Israel. China supports a two-state solution and the establishment of a Palestinian state based on the 1967 borders, with East Jerusalem as its capital. Relations deteriorated after the October 7 attacks and the subsequent Gaza war, with China supporting South Africa's genocide case against Israel, classifying Israel's actions in Gaza as a genocide, and calling for the "imperative" of an arms embargo on Israel in August 2025.

Israel maintains an embassy in Beijing and consulates-general in Guangzhou, Hong Kong, and Shanghai, while China maintains an embassy in Tel Aviv.

== History ==
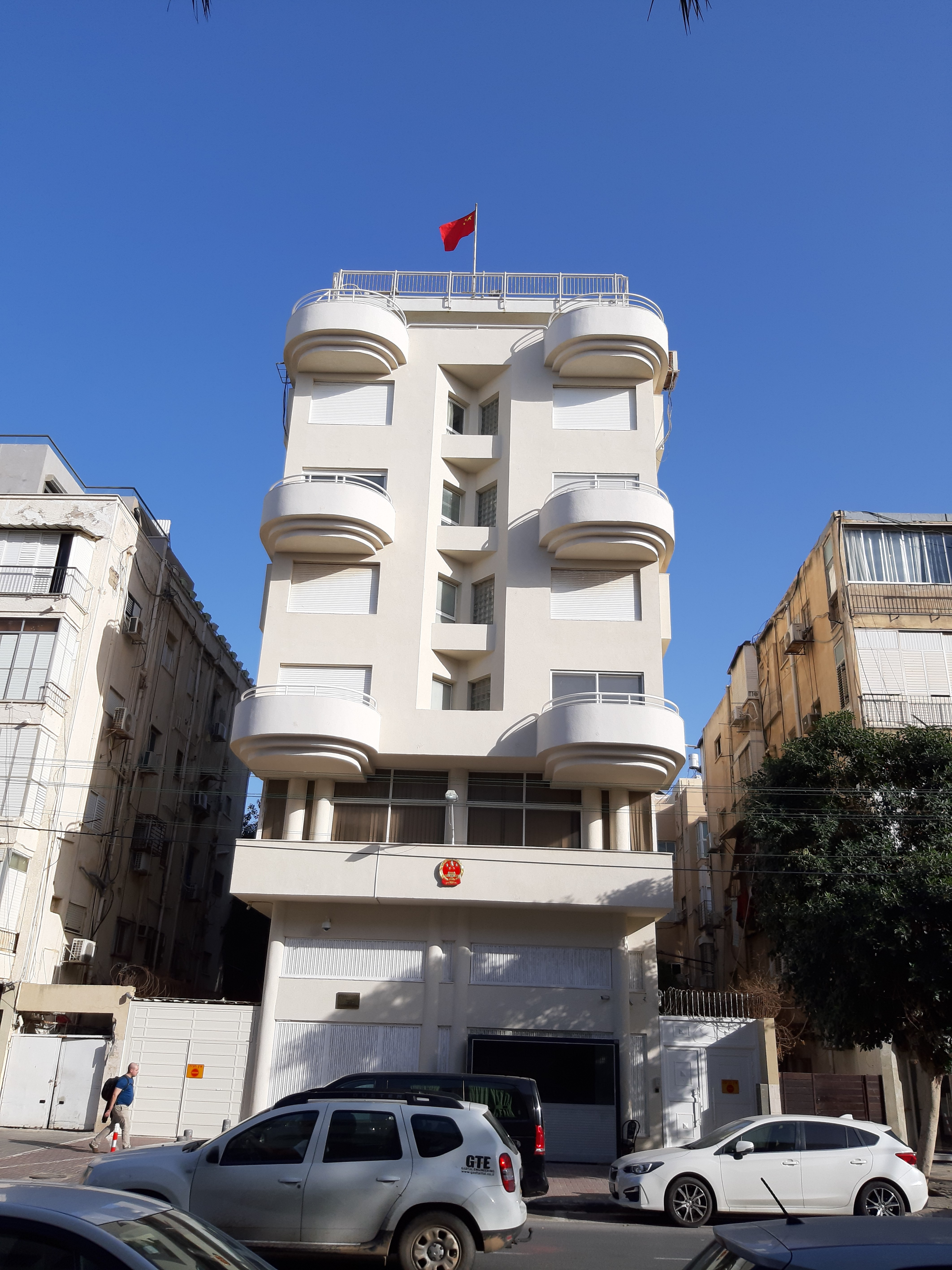
Embassy of China in Tel Aviv

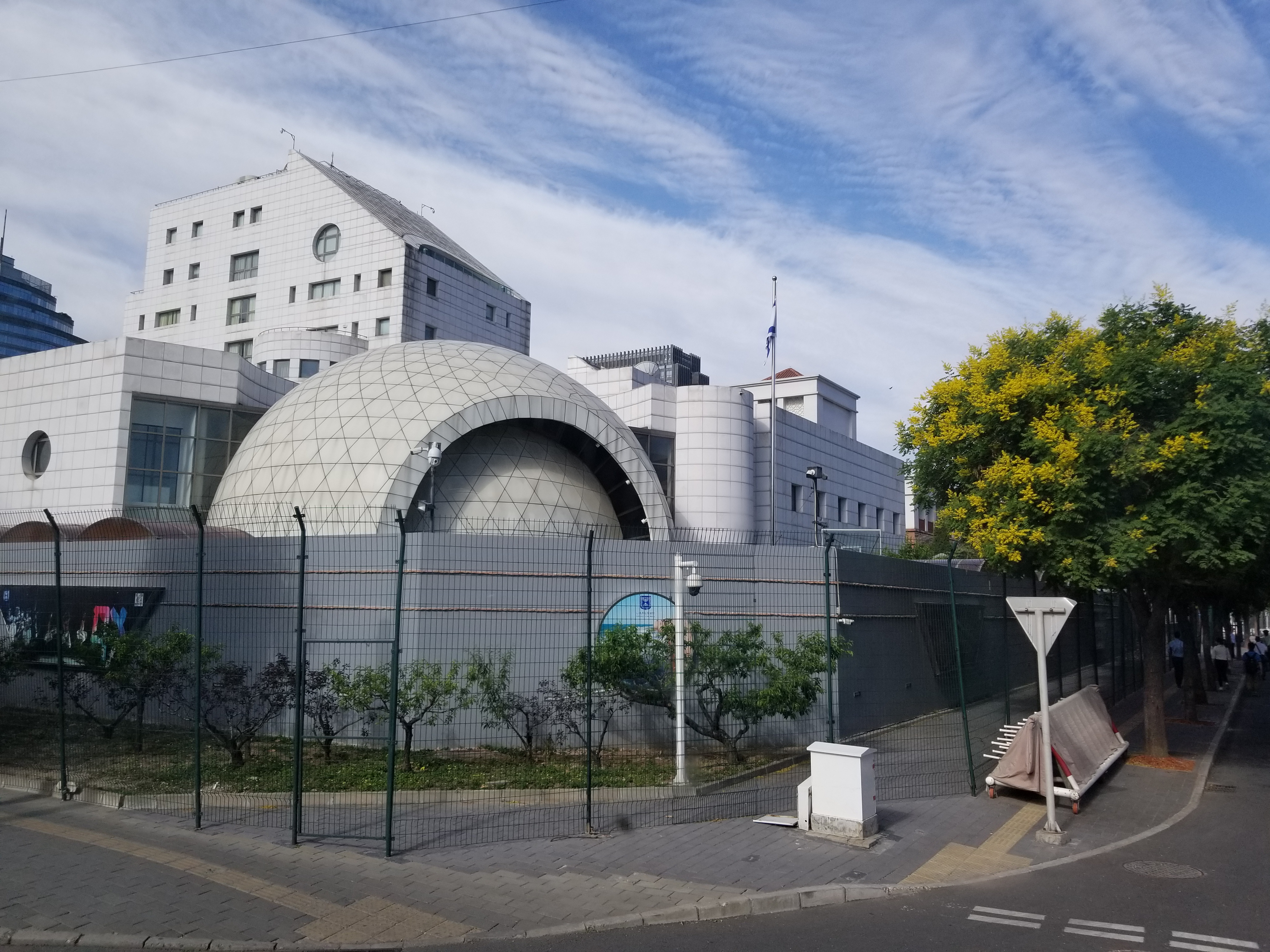
Embassy of Israel in Beijing

In the 1930s, David Ben-Gurion, then leader of the Yishuv in Palestine, proclaimed that China would be one of the great world powers of the future.

During the 1930s and 1940s, Shanghai was an important haven for Jewish refugees. Along with the legacies of individuals such as Ho Feng-Shan who protected Jews, this history continues to be a shared positive point of reference for contemporary relations between China and Israel. Major Israeli officials including Prime Minister Benjamin Netanyahu have emphasized this history during visits to the Shanghai Jewish Refugees Museum.

For some time after the Chinese Communist Revolution in 1949, the People's Republic of China (PRC) was diplomatically isolated, because the United States and its allies, including Israel, recognized the Republic of China (ROC, commonly known as Taiwan after 1949) as the sole legitimate government of China. The Nationalist government of the ROC had been historically sympathetic to the Zionist cause, while ROC founder Sun Yat-sen affirmed his support for the creation of a Jewish state.

Before 1955, the People's Republic of China (PRC) did not have a stance on the Arab-Israeli conflict. This was largely because the PRC had few diplomatic contacts with Israel and the independent Arab states recognized the ROC at the time and not the PRC.

During the 1955 Bandung Conference, the PRC expressed support for the Palestinian right of return, but refrained from denying Israel's right to exist and secretly pursued trade ties with the Israelis. In January 1950, Israel formally recognized the PRC, becoming the first Middle Eastern state to do so.

During the Suez Crisis in 1956, China made strong statements in support of Egypt but did not make references to Israel when it condemned France and Britain.

In 1975, the PRC supported United Nations General Assembly Resolution 3379 that stated that Zionism was a form of racism. Until the 1980s, China refused to grant visas to Israelis unless they held dual citizenship and carried a passport of a country other than Israel. However, following the Sino-Soviet split and China's 1979 establishment of diplomatic relations with the United States, China began to develop a series of secret, non-official ties with Israel.

=== Developing ties ===
China and Israel secretly began building military ties in the 1980s during the Soviet–Afghan War, which both Israel and China opposed. They both supplied weapons to the Afghan mujahideen (Israel sending captured Palestine Liberation Organization weapons via the United States and Pakistan), and military cooperation between the two began in order to assist the Islamic resistance against the Soviets. China and Israel subsequently started exchanging visits of delegations of academics, experts, businessmen and industrialists. Reportedly, a large number of the heavy tanks used in China's 1984 National Day parades were retrofitted by Israel from captured Six-Day War equipment.

China eased travel restrictions, while Israel reopened its consulate in Hong Kong (then under British administration), which would serve as the main point for diplomatic and economic contact between the two nations. In 1987 Israel's Prime Minister, Shimon Peres, appointed Amos Yudan to set up the first official Government owned company (Copeco Ltd) to establish and foster commercial activities between companies in China and Israel. The company was active until 1992, when official diplomatic relationships were announced between Israel and China. In the early 1990s, China joined a number of nations who established ties with Israel after the initiation of a peace process between Israel and the PLO in the early 1990s; it also desired to play a role in the peace process.

The two countries established full diplomatic relations in 1992. Previously, Israel and China's representative offices in Beijing and Tel Aviv functioned as de facto embassies. The Israeli office was formally known as the Liaison Office of the Israel Academy of Sciences and Humanities. This was opened in June 1990. China was similarly represented by a branch of the China International Travel Service, which also opened in 1990.

Zev Sufott, who had served in the liaison office of the Israel Academy of Sciences and Humanities in Beijing beginning in 1991, was appointed as Israel's first Ambassador to China upon the establishment of diplomatic relations in 1992.

Early bilateral cooperation including establishing the Sino-Israeli Agricultural Training Center at China Agricultural University.

=== Relations in the 21st century ===
In 2009, China Radio International (CRI) began broadcasting in Hebrew. In addition, the Chinese established Chinese institutes in Israel, to public and media activities of Israel-based Chinese diplomats.

Prime Minister Benjamin Netanyahu visited China in May 2013. Netanyahu visited China again in 2017 amid celebrations taking place to commemorate 25 years of ties between the two countries.

During the 2014 Israel–Gaza conflict, it was reported that Israel was winning the public opinion battle in China with most Chinese social media users siding with Israel.

Starting in 2019, Chinese state-sponsored cyberespionage group UNC215 targeted Israeli government institutions, IT providers, and telecommunication firms in a series of attacks that attempted to disguise themselves as Iranian hackers.

In May 2020, the Chinese ambassador to Israel, Du Wei, was found dead at his home in Herzliya. While the exact cause of his death is unknown, it is believed he died of natural causes.

In November 2021, Israeli President Isaac Herzog and Chinese leader, CCP general secretary Xi Jinping held the first-ever phone call between heads of state of Israel and China. According to the read-out from the Israeli President's Office, Herzog and Xi discussed opportunities to enhance Israeli-Chinese bilateral ties ahead of the 30th anniversary of the establishment of diplomatic relations, in honor of which Herzog and Xi invited each other to visit their respective countries.

On 26 July 2023, Chinese Ambassador to Israel Cai Run visited Prime Minister Benjamin Netanyahu's office and gifted him four autographed copies of Xi Jinping's book The Governance of China. The Prime Minister's Office released a picture of the meeting and Netanyahu skimming through the book, while a spokesperson for Netanyahu said "The ambassador told Prime Minister Netanyahu that President Xi read with interest and appreciation what the Prime Minister wrote in his memoir about China-Israel relations".

Multiple commentators have noted a worsening in relations between the two countries since the October 7 attacks and the subsequent Gaza war.

In 2025, Boaz Toporovsky led a Knesset delegation to Taiwan, the Chinese embassy in Israel objected strongly to the trip labeling Toporovsky a 'trouble-maker' and saying that such trips endanger the foundations of Israel-China relations. The statement also accused Toporovsky of violating the One China principle and said that "If he is not restrained, he will fall and shatter into pieces on the edge of the abyss." The statement also threatened Toporovsky, saying that he should "not delude himself that he can harm China's core interests... without paying a price." Ambassador Xiao Junzheng amplified the message by sharing it on social media. The Embassy later denied that it had threatened Toporovsky claiming that it had instead used a "popular Chinese saying." In October 2025 the Chinese embassy in Israel held a public presentation about the "Taiwan Question" for the first time, reiterating their pro-unification position.

Israel announced in June 2026 that it would close its consulate general in Chengdu, which subsequently closed in July. In October 2026, Chinese Foreign Minister Wang Yi met with Israeli President Isaac Herzog at the sidelines of the summit of the Conference on Interaction and Confidence-Building Measures in Asia in Baku, Azerbaijan, where he said "The imperative priority is to fully open access routes into Gaza. Two million civilians must not be left to struggle on the brink of survival, nor can this humanitarian catastrophe be allowed to spread" and called on Israel to halt and reverse the expansion of settlements in the West Bank.

== Military relations ==
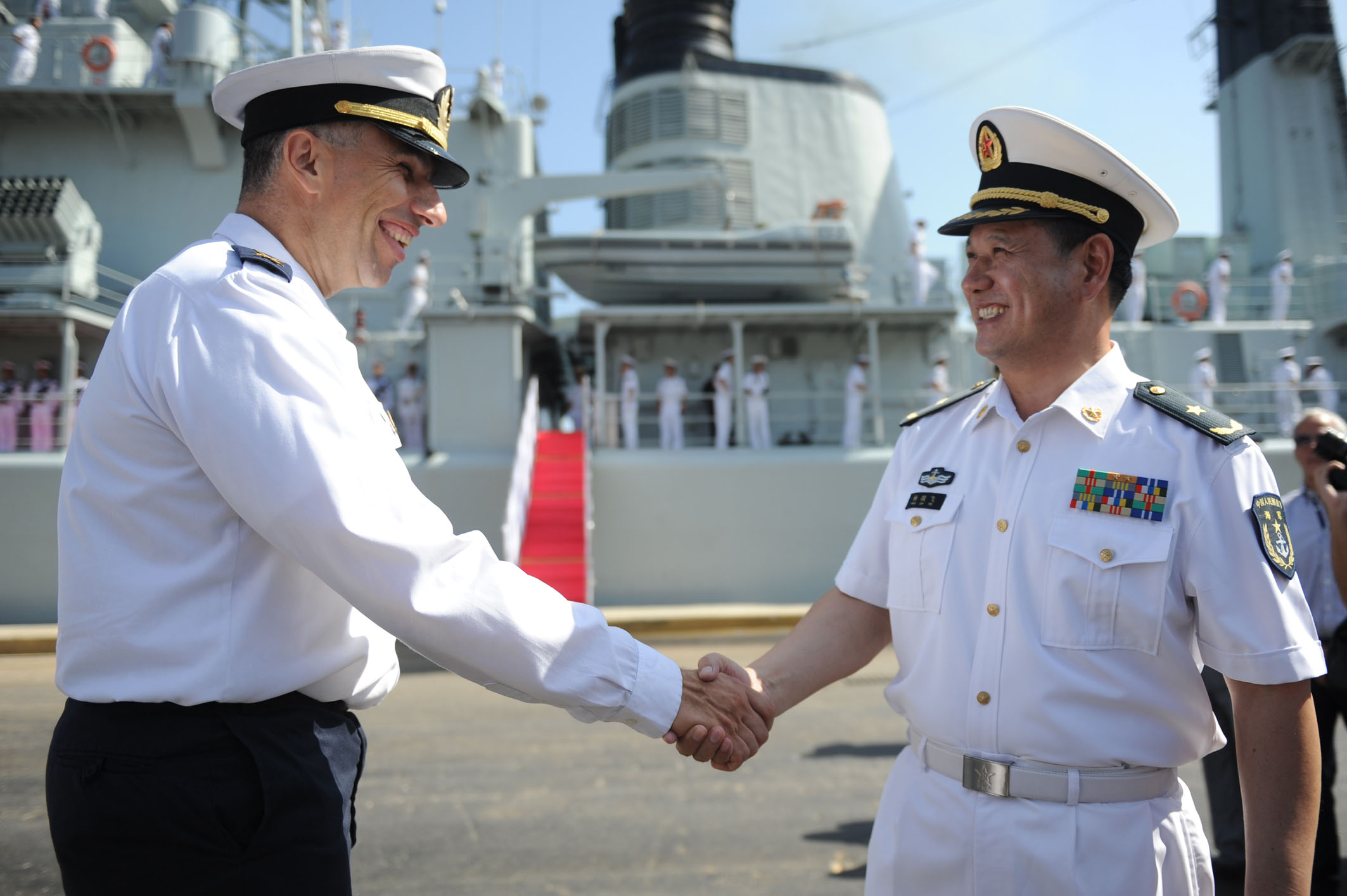
Haifa base commander Brig. Gen. Eli Sharvit welcomes RADM Yang Junfei to Israel

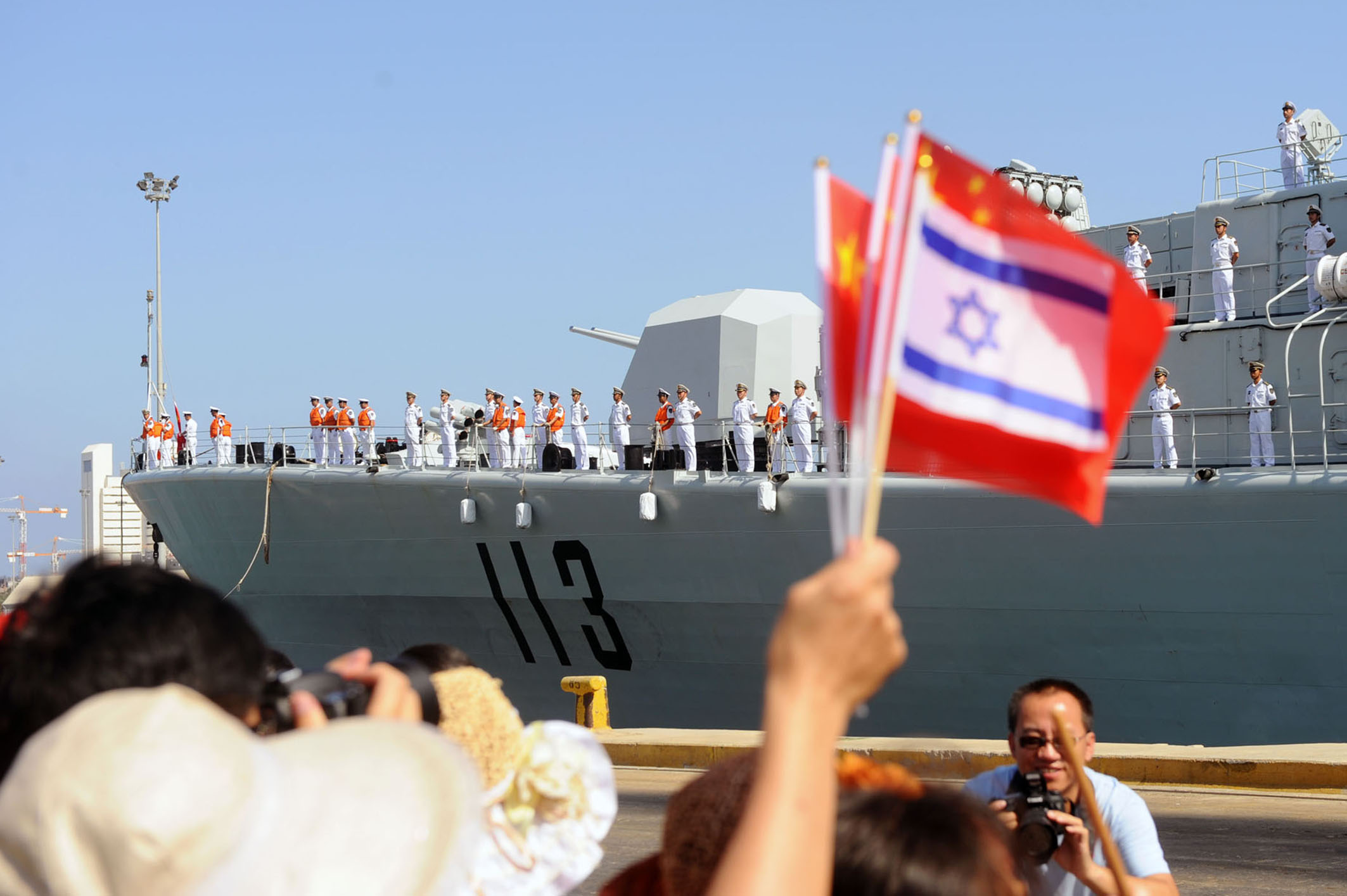
Chinese navy docks in Israel

Israel and China began military-to-military relations as early as the 1980s, even though no formal diplomatic relations existed. Before diplomatic relations were established in 1992 Israel had been selling arms to China. The use of military sales as a means of achieving foreign-policy goals was neither new nor unprecedented in Israeli foreign policy to promote its interests. Israel sold technology to upgrade Chinese tanks and planes in the 1980s. IAI Lavi and unmanned aerial vehicle technology seems to have been sold to China. Expertise in fitting western equipment in Soviet made hardware helped in modernization of Chinese army and air force, this way Chinese defense modernization complemented Israel's need of cash to fund its domestic made high-tech weapons programs.

The arms embargo imposed by Western countries on China after the 1989 Tiananmen Square protests and massacre offered an additional incentive for military relations and bilateral cooperation as a whole. Sanctions imposed by Western countries almost froze Chinese access to advanced military and dual-use technologies. Israel then sought to benefit from the situation and became China's backdoor for acquiring Western technology.

Israel was ready to sell China the EL/M-2075 Phalcon, an Israeli airborne early-warning radar system (AWACS), until the United States forced it to cancel the deal. Some estimate that Israel sold arms worth US$4 billion to China in this period.

China had looked to Israel for the arms and military technology it could not acquire from the United States, Europe and Russia. China is a vital market for Israel's aerospace and defense industry.

The U.S. Defense Intelligence Agency compiled evidence that Israel had transferred missile, laser and aircraft technology to China in the 1990s. On 19 October 1999, the Defense Minister of China, Chi Haotian, flew to Israel and met with Ehud Barak, then-Prime Minister and Defense Minister of Israel. They reached several high-level agreements, including a $1 billion Israeli-Russian sale of military aircraft to China. On 25 May 2011, the Commander of the People's Liberation Army Navy, Admiral Wu Shengli, made an official visit to Israel, meeting with Barak and Rear Admiral Eliezer Marom.

On 14 August 2011, General Chen Bingde, Chief of the People's Liberation Army General Staff Department, made an official visit to Israel. He came a guest of the Israeli Chief of Staff Benny Gantz, who received him with an honor guard at the Kirya military headquarters in Tel Aviv. The visit came after Defense Minister Ehud Barak's visit to China in June, the first visit of a defense minister to the country in a decade. Bingde's visit was part of a tour that included stops in Russia and Ukraine.

On 13 August 2012, vessels from the People's Liberation Army Navy's 11th escort fleet, led by Rear Admiral Yang Jun-fei, anchored at Israel's Haifa naval base for a four-day goodwill visit to mark 20 years of cooperation between the Israel Defense Forces and the PLA. The vessels and crewmen were welcomed by the Haifa base commander, Brigadier General Eli Sharvit, and Chinese embassy officials. In July 2018, 180 acres of the Northern port in Haifa were transferred to the state-owned Shanghai International Port Group (SIPG) for a 25-year period of management. This sparked a heated discussion in the Israeli press and the academy, as well as a special discussion by the Israeli cabinet. It also came up in discussions between US National Security Advisor John Bolton and Israeli prime minister Benjamin Netanyahu when they met on January 7, 2019.

In 2025, Israel's Ministry of Defense prohibited the use of certain BYD electric cars due to cyber-espionage concerns of unauthorized transmission of data to China. In January 2026, China prohibited domestic firms from using Israeli cybersecurity software.

== Economic ties ==
China is Israel's largest East Asian trading partner and has sought Israel's expertise in solar energy, manufacturing robotics, irrigation, construction, agricultural and water management and desalination technologies to combat drought and water shortages.

Since the 2010s, China and Israel enhanced bilateral economic ties with China connecting both Chinese and Israeli businessmen and investors to invest in each other's economies respectively. Chinese economic cooperation with Israel has seen substantial Chinese investment of more than US$15 billion in the Israeli economy, spawning seed capital in Israeli startup companies, as well as the acquisition of Israeli companies by major Chinese corporations that incorporate Israel's know how to help invigorate the development of the modern Chinese economy more efficiently. China ranked second in 2015 after the United States on collaboration with Israeli high-tech firms that are backed by Israel's Office of the Chief Scientist. Major Chinese firms such as Fosun, ChemChina, Brightfood, Horizons Ventures and China Everbright have invested significant amounts of financial capital and resources across numerous Israeli industries.

Investment from China in Israeli technology reached an aggregate of $15 billion from 2011 to 2017 with the surplus of Chinese investment capital finding its way through Israel's high technology sector, including agriculture, pharmaceutical, medical devices, artificial intelligence and autonomous driving.

On 3 July 2011, Israel and the People's Republic of China signed an economic cooperation agreement to boost trade between the two countries. According to Eliran Elimelech, Israel's commercial attaché in Beijing, the agreement was expected to deepen ties between Israeli and Chinese businessmen in the short term, and in the medium to long term to improve trade conditions between the countries. In January 2011, the Israeli Central Bureau of Statistics stated that Israeli exports to China had grown by an annual 95 percent in 2010 to $2 billion. In September 2011, the Israeli Minister of Transport, Israel Katz, stated that China and Israel were discussing the construction of a high-speed rail link joining the Mediterranean Sea with the Red Sea. This joint project would permit the mass overland transport of Chinese goods to Israel and Eastern Europe, and would involve both Chinese and Israeli railway developers. The following month, the Chinese and Israeli governments signed a memorandum of understanding regarding the joint construction of a 180-km (112-mile) railway linking the Israeli city of Eilat with the Negev Desert's Zin Valley, Beersheba, and Tel Aviv.

In August 2012, with Chinese-Israeli trade growing, the Beijing University of International Business and Economics in Beijing set up a department dedicated to studying Israeli economics and Judaism, while some Chinese universities began offering Hebrew courses. The group SIGNAL has established an exchange network of Chinese and Israeli scholars and academics to help them collaborate with each other on various academic projects.

In 2013, China and Israel began to boost the economic relations with respect to agriculture. The two countries decided to set up an agriculture technology incubator in Anhui Province, China enabling joint development of agriculture technologies and solutions in keeping with requirements on the ground. Israeli agriculture trade fairs such as Agrivest and AgriTech have witnessed large Chinese delegations and greater participation from Chinese state-owned enterprises and private companies as Chinese's growing middle class and increasing consumer demand as well as increased pressure on agricultural land has prompted the East Asian giant to increasingly look at Israeli agriculture technology to boost crop yields and dairy production. Horizons Ventures, a venture capital firm established by Hong Kong business magnate Li Ka-shing, led a US$10.8 million strategic investment in Windward, an Israeli maritime data and analytics company. MarInt, Windward's satellite maritime analytics system, is widely used by many security, intelligence and law enforcement agencies across the world. In 2013, Li donated US$130 million to Technion. A large part of the money came from the profits he made from the IPO of Waze, an Israeli GPS-based map software company, in which he held an 11 percent stake that eventually acquired by Google. His was the largest donation ever made to Technion and one of the biggest to any Israeli academic institution. Li has been the pioneer of Chinese investment in Israel.

Bilateral trade between the two nations increased from $50 million to $10 billion in 2013. Since 2013, Chinese investors have begun to show a growing interest in Israeli firms. Recent high end deals include Beijing winning a $2 billion tender to build the "Med-Red" railway linking Ashdod port with Eilat as well as a $1 billion Israeli port tender, a $300 million joint research center between Tel Aviv University and Tsinghua University, HK billionaire Li Ka-shing donating $130 million to Technion in return for building a technology school in Guangdong, and Chinese acquisition of a controlling stake in Israel's Tnuva dairy company for more than US$1 billion. The acquisition of Tnuva was the biggest Chinese buyout of an Israeli company since 2011 when state-owned ChemChina bought Adama, the pesticides and crop protection company then known as Makhteshim Agan, for US$2.4 billion. In 2014, Chinese-Israeli tech deals totaled $300 million, up from $50 million in 2013, according to Israel's National Economic Council.

Bilateral between the two countries reached in excess of $10 billion in trade since the start of 2015. In January 2015, a number of Chinese information technology companies began to make investments in Israel, Chinese e-commerce giant Alibaba invested an undisclosed sum in Visualead, an Israeli company specializing in QR code technology. Alibaba has also invested in Israel-based venture fund Jerusalem Venture Partners, becoming a limited partner joining Qihoo 360, another Chinese web company to have invested in the Jerusalem-based fund. Baidu, China's largest search engine, has put US$3 million into Pixellot, an Israeli video capture start-up and provided funds to Carmel Ventures, an Israeli venture capital firm as well as lead a $5 million investment round in the Israeli music education firm Tonara. In addition, leading Chinese technology firms such as Huawei, Legend and Xiaomi have set up R&D centers in Israel. In March 2015, Israel joined China's newly constituted Asian Infrastructure Investment Bank (AIIB).

Israel and China began negotiating a free trade agreement in 2019. The discussions coincided with China's beginning of free trade agreement negotiations with Palestine. According to academic Dawn C. Murphy, China likely proceeded concurrently with both countries in order to avoid perceptions of favoritism.

Al Jazeera reported in 2025 that China including Hong Kong is the second largest importer of Israeli goods ($4.8 billion) and the largest exporter ($19 billion) country to Israel.

== Bilateral issues ==
Following the October 7 attacks and the subsequent Gaza war, commentators generally note a worsening in relations between the two countries. In 2024, public opinion polling showed a majority of Israelis consider China to be unfriendly or hostile toward Israel, although data from the Pew Research Center found a sharp difference between Jewish and Arab Israelis in how they saw the East Asian country.

=== Security concerns ===
Israel's increasing defense cooperation with China has caused concern in Western nations, particularly the United States, which is the largest foreign supplier of military equipment to Israel. Owing to strategic Chinese rivalry with Japan, South Korea, the Philippines, India and Vietnam, as well as concerns over the security of Taiwan, the United States has pressured Israel against selling sophisticated equipment and technology to China. In 1992, The Washington Times alleged that exported American Patriot missiles and Israel's indigenous Lavi jet aircraft technology had been shared with China, although official U.S. investigations did not substantiate these charges. In 2000, Israel cancelled the sale to China of the Israeli-built Phalcon Airborne Warning and Control System (AWACS) in the wake of pressure from the U.S., which threatened to cut off US$2.8 billion in yearly aid if the deal went through. Israel's decision drew condemnation from China, which stated that the cancellation would hurt bilateral ties. China's record of proliferating arms and weapons systems has also concerned U.S. planners, as the U.S. worries that China may repackage advanced Israeli defense technologies for resale to America's rivals and nations hostile to it throughout the world.

Chinese involvement in the Israeli technology sector has also generated security concerns. The former head of Mossad, Efraim Halevy, is one of the major critics in Israel who believes that the country should examine the geopolitical considerations with China and has consistently warned the Israeli government against involving the Chinese in a proposed high-speed railway to Eilat, arguing that it could lead to a crisis in strategic relations with the United States. Other critics argue that growing Chinese involvement will endanger Israeli security and lead to theft of Israeli technology to be utilized in Chinese espionage further arguing that Israel should balance its burgeoning relations with China with maintaining a balance of relations with the United States at the same time. In 2025, the IDF banned all Chinese-made vehicles from entering military bases due to national security concerns about unauthorized data collection.

=== Taiwan ===
Since 1992, Israel has followed the one China principle, and recognizes government of the People's Republic of China as the sole legal government representing the whole of China and Taiwan as "an inalienable part" of China. Israel maintains unofficial relations with Taiwan.

=== Uyghurs ===
In August 2022, Liu Jianchao warned the Israeli ambassador to China, Irit Ben-Abba, against taking the U.S. stance on China's persecution of the Uyghurs as classifying it as a genocide.

=== Iran ===
In 2010, the United Nations Security Council passed Resolution 1929, imposing a fourth round of international sanctions against Iran for its nuclear enrichment program. China ultimately supported this resolution, although initially, due to the strong bilateral relations and nuclear cooperation between the China and Iran, China opposed the sanctions. According to The New York Times, Israel lobbied for the sanctions by explaining to China the impact of any pre-emptive strike on Iran would have on the world oil supply, and hence on the Chinese economy.

==== Twelve-Day War ====
In June 2025, China's ambassador to the UN, Fu Cong, condemned Israeli strikes on Iran while Wang Yi referred to Israel's strikes as "unacceptable". On 2 July 2025, Israel urged China to pressure Iran to restrain its nuclear ambitions.

==== 2026 Iran war ====
In March 2026, China's foreign ministry condemned Israeli and American strikes on Iran and declared its support for Iran "in defending its sovereignty, security, territorial integrity, and national dignity."

=== Israel–Palestine conflict ===
Publishing in 2025, academic Chuchu Zhang writes that China seeks to balance its approaches with Israel and Palestine, providing rhetorical support for Palestine and some criticism of Israel, but avoiding committing resources to Palestine that could jeopardize China's economic relationship with Israel.

China's then Foreign Minister Li Zhaoxing called the Israeli West Bank barrier wall an obstacle to peace in a September 2006 statement during a UN Security Council meeting on the Middle East. In November 2008, then China Ambassador to the United States Yesui Zhang stated that the "continued construction of settlements on the West Bank is not only in violation of Israel's obligations under international law, but is also detrimental to guaranteeing Israel's own security." According to analysis from the Jamestown Foundation, China's policy on Israel and Palestine is based on soft power diplomacy, and maintain a balancing act between its Israeli and Arab world ties. On June 8, 2015, China demanded Israel to refrain from utilizing Chinese migrant construction workers in Israeli settlements in the West Bank. China sought this ban out of concern for the Chinese workers' safety in areas beyond the Green Line, which marks Israel's pre-1967 borders. The government of Israel has been eager to negotiate a deal with China completed in the hope that an influx of foreign workers will increase the rate of housing construction in Israel and reduce the costs of new homes.

After the victory of Hamas in the 2006 elections in Gaza, China acknowledged Hamas as the legitimately elected political entity in the Gaza Strip despite Israeli and U.S. opposition. The Chinese government met with senior Hamas representative Mahmoud al-Zahar, who previously served as Palestinian foreign minister, during the June 2006 China-Arab States Cooperation Forum in Beijing which held direct bilateral talks despite protests from Israel and the United States. A spokesperson for the Chinese Foreign Ministry stated that "the Palestinian government is legally elected by the people there and it should be respected." Besides the Chinese recognition of Hamas, China also does not designate Hezbollah as a terrorist organization.

After the May 31, 2010 Gaza flotilla raid the Chinese Foreign Ministry spokesman Ma Zhaoxu condemned Israel. On April 28, 2011, after the rival Palestinian factions Fatah and Hamas formed a national unity government, Chinese Foreign Ministry spokesman Hong Lei said that China welcomed the internal reconciliation. During the November 2012 Operation Pillar of Defense in the Gaza Strip, the Ministry of Foreign Affairs of the People's Republic of China urged all sides to display restraint.

In 2012, the families of eight Israeli terror victims of the 2008 Mercaz HaRav massacre in Jerusalem filed a $1 billion lawsuit against the Bank of China. The suit asserted that in 2003 the bank's New York branch wired millions of dollars to Hamas from its leadership in Syria and Iran. The Bank of China subsequently denied providing banking services to terrorist groups: "The Bank of China has always strictly followed the UN's anti-money laundering and anti-terrorist financing requirements and regulations in China and other judicial areas where we operate." The case was dismissed in 2015.

On July 23, 2014, China was among the 29 nations who voted in favor of the investigation by the United Nations Human Rights Council of war crimes committed by Israel during Operation Protective Edge, with the United States being the only nation in dissent. In addition, Chinese Foreign Ministry Spokesperson Hong Lei earlier on 9 July 2014 issued a statement in response to the violence during the military operation, stating: "We believe that to resort to force and to counter violence with violence will not help resolve problems other than pile up more hatred. We urge relevant parties to bear in mind the broader picture of peace and the lives of the people, immediately realize a ceasefire, stick to the strategic choice of peace talks and strive for an early resumption of talks." In July 2017, Chinese leader Xi Jinping delivered a formalization of China's positions in his "Four Points" on the "issue of Israel-Palestine conflict", the first of which was that China supported the establishment of an independent, sovereign Palestine within the framework of the two-state solution based on the 1967 borders, with East Jerusalem as its capital.

In May 2021, Israel's embassy in Beijing accused Chinese state media outlet China Global Television Network of "blatant antisemitism" when host Zheng Junfeng broadcast a segment accusing US policy on Israel of being influenced by wealthy Jews, during the 2021 Israel–Palestine crisis.

==== Gaza war ====
Following the 2023 October 7 attacks, an Israeli embassy official said Israel expected to see a "stronger condemnation" of Hamas and that it was "not the time to call for a two-state solution" when people were "being murdered, slaughtered in the streets." The Israeli Ministry of Foreign Affairs later expressed "deep disappointment" over China not condemning Hamas. Commentary in Chinese state media and social media blamed the U.S. for the conflict and spread antisemitic tropes. Some people equated Israel's actions to Nazism by accusing them of committing genocide on Palestinians, prompting a rebuke from the German embassy in Beijing. Chinese foreign minister Wang Yi stated that in Gaza, "Israel's actions have gone beyond self-defense." In January 2024, Israel reported that it discovered a "massive" stockpile of Chinese weaponry used by Hamas. The same month, China voiced support for South Africa's genocide case against Israel.

Chinese suppliers as of December 2023 have created bureaucratic obstacles for Israeli tech factories, delaying shipments of electronic components to Israel for civilian and military use. The Chinese government, according to Israeli officials, has refused to send workers to Israel during the war. Chinese shipping companies COSCO Shipping and OOCL have suspended trade with Israel as early as 18 December 2023, sparking concerns by Israeli analysts that the Bayport terminal run by the state-owned Shanghai International Port Group in the Port of Haifa is a security risk.

On the first anniversary of the 7 October Hamas-led attack on Israel, Xinhua News Agency criticized U.S. diplomatic and military support for Israel. The Chinese government's Spamouflage influence operation has also criticized U.S. support for Israel and spread antisemitic tropes online.

In May 2025, Chinese Ambassador to Israel Xiao Junzheng stated the October 7 attacks was "inhumane, unforgivable and also outrageous", adding "China opposes and condemns what Hamas did on the seventh of October", while maintaining support for a two-state solution. In July 2025, Xiao rejected reports about Chinese dual-use technology exports to Iran to rebuild its missiles following the Twelve-Day War. He said that "China has made it clear and publicly that we oppose Iran’s development and possession of nuclear weapons" and that "We respect Israel’s right to subsistence and development. We are against some slogans by some people and some countries about wiping Israel off the map of the world." He added that China condemns "intrusion" by Hamas into Israeli territory, stating "international law grants occupied populations rights to employ armed resistance ending foreign occupation" but that "this stops there" and does not allow invading Israeli territory and violence against civilians.

In August 2025, China officially referred to genocide in Gaza with the U.S. as an "accomplice" and called for the "imperative of an arm embargo on Israel." In September 2025, Benjamin Netanyahu accused China, along with Qatar of orchestrating and leading a propaganda campaign to politically "besiege" Israel by undermining its global support, particularly in Western media and among allies.

== See also ==
- Antisemitism in China
- China–Palestine relations
- Chinese people in Israel
- Dates of establishment of diplomatic relations with the People's Republic of China
- History of the Jews in China
- Hong Kong–Israel relations
- International recognition of Israel
- Israelis in China
- Kaifeng Jews
- A Jewish Girl in Shanghai, a 2010 Chinese animated film

== Sources ==
- Wald, Shalom Salomon (2004). China and the Jewish People. Jerusalem: The Jewish People Planning Policy Institute / Gefen Publishing House. ISBN 965-229-347-4.
