= Chinese Israeli =

The terms Chinese Israeli or Israeli Chinese may refer to:

- People's Republic of China–Israel relations
- Republic of China–Israel relations
- Chinese people in Israel, including guest workers, Jews from China, and others
- Israelis in China
- Mixed race people of Israeli and Chinese descent
- Multiple citizenship of Israel and either the People's Republic of China or the Republic of China

== See also ==
- Aliyah
- Kaifeng Jews
- History of the Jews in China
