= Chinese people in Israel =

Total population
- 10,000

Regions with significant populations
- Tel Aviv, Haifa, Jerusalem

Languages
- Shanghainese, Mandarin Chinese, Hebrew

Religion
- Buddhism, Taoism, Christianity, Judaism.

Related ethnic groups
- Overseas Chinese

Chinese people in Israel comprise several separate groups, including the groups of Jews from China who have immigrated to Israel making aliyah, as well as foreign students studying in Israeli universities, businessmen, merchants, and guest workers, along with Israeli citizens of Chinese ancestry.

== Chinese immigrants ==
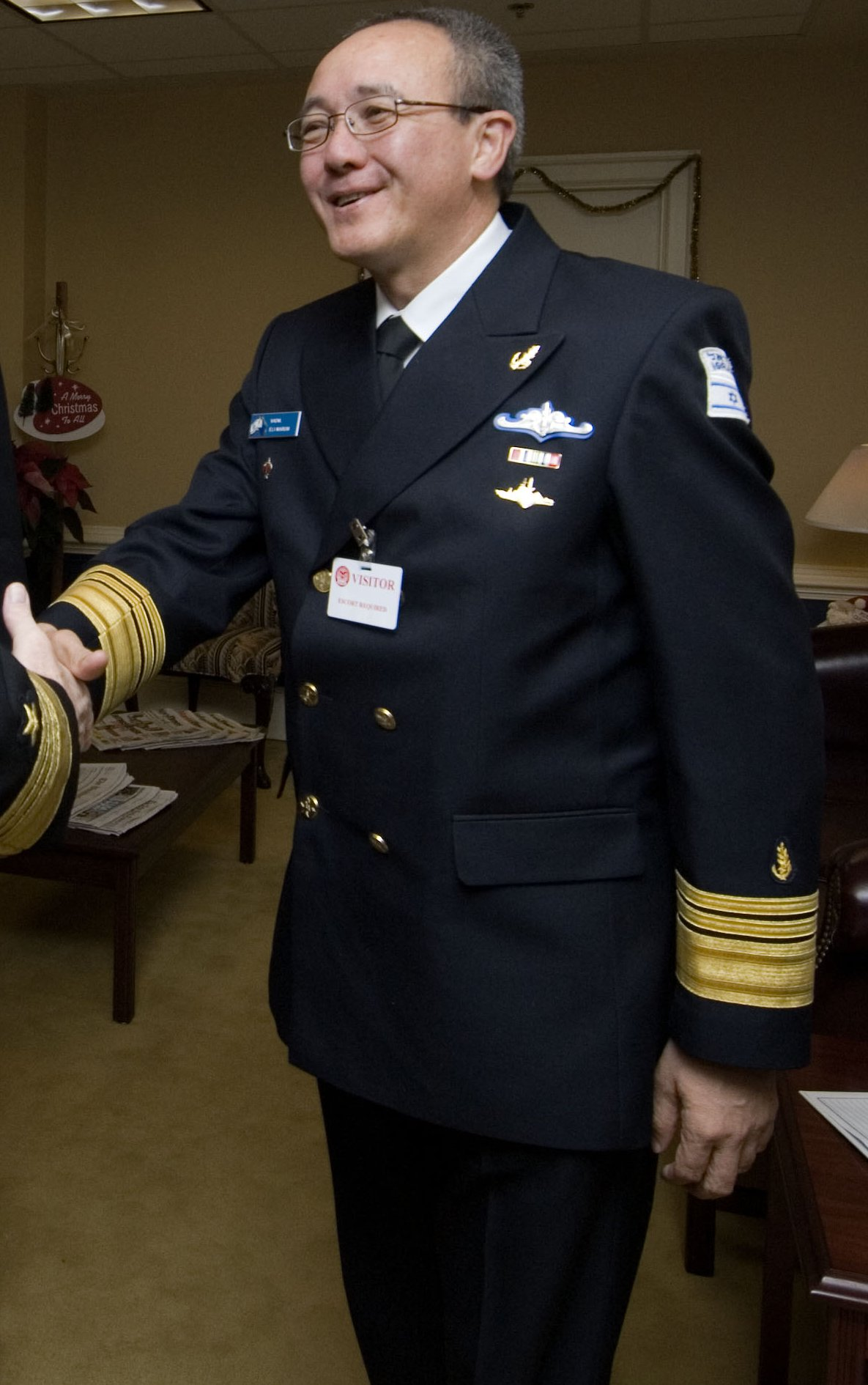
Eli Marom

=== Jews from Shanghai ===
An early immigrant to Israel of Chinese background was the mother of Eli Marom, Israel's first high-ranking military officer of Chinese descent, appointed Aluf of the Israeli Navy in 2007. His mother was a member of the Chinese Jewish community, the daughter of a local Chinese man and a Russian Jewish woman. She married Marom's father who had fled from Germany to China during World War Two. In 1955, the couple moved to Israel, where Eli Marom was born.

Another immigrant with a similar background is Sara Imas, the daughter of a German Jewish father and Jiangsu mother born and raised in Shanghai. She immigrated to Israel in 1991 at the age of 41 and was received by then Israeli Prime Minister Yitzhak Rabin as the first Jewish immigrant from the People's Republic of China to Israel after the two countries established diplomatic relations. After having received Israeli citizenship and living in Israel for ten years, she returned to Shanghai as the representative of a diamond company.

=== Kaifeng Jews ===
In 2005, Jerusalem-based Shavei Israel, a privately funded conservative religious organization, began assisting Kaifeng's Jewish descendants to make aliyah, first bringing them to Israel and then preparing them to undertake Orthodox conversion to Judaism, in order to legally qualify to remain under the Law of Return. Most of Kaifeng's Jewish descendants are of patrilineal rather than matrilineal Jewish descent. As a result, Israeli religious courts have required them to undergo Orthodox conversions in order to be recognised as Jews.

The first of the estimated 1,000 Jewish descendants currently living in China to arrive was Shlomo Jin who arrived in Israel with his wife Dina and daughter Shalva in 2000. He had entered the country on a tourist visa and overstayed and was almost deported before his right to remain was recognised.

Shavei Israel has helped 14 Chinese citizens make aliyah and undergo the process of immigration and conversion. Founder Michael Freund states that his organisation would bring more if the Israeli bureaucratic and religious procedures were less complicated.

== Guest workers ==
In 2001, the number of Chinese workers in Israel was estimated at 23,000, of whom less than half were employed. Many were in the country illegally and working in violation of the terms of their visas.

=== Working visa and wages ===
According to Kav LaOved (Worker's Hotline), a non-profit organization which promotes foreign worker interests, Chinese workers pay a $12,000 commission to mediators to receive a permit to work in Israel. Some allegedly pay up to US$19,000 for a work visa. This is usually paid by loans to which family members are guarantors. It was estimated that about 70 percent went to Israeli manpower companies. Wages can be as high as US$1,500, although they are not always paid the full sum. Manpower companies also often retain the passports of workers, allegedly for safekeeping, and force workers to pay to get their passports back.

In April 2011, eight persons involved in providing Chinese workers for the Israeli construction industry were arrested on charges of exploiting the workers.

As Chinese workers have no community in the country to help them, if they have visa problems, are not trained for the job for which they were brought to Israel, or find themselves with an unscrupulous employer, they may be deported. According to an Israeli State Comptroller report in 1998, an employer's failure to pay the requisite fees led to the arrest of his workers as a penalty. If the employer sent workers to a place other than that specified in their visas, the workers were arrested and deported.

When Wang Chang-Chi, a Chinese worker who was known for having exposed corrupt practices, helping his fellow workers, and serving as a liaison between the Chinese community, the police, and the press, he was arrested in 2003 in order to be deported after having stayed in Israel for seven years, six of them illegally. Interior Minister Avraham Poraz stated in response to a letter: "We're not interested in cultivating a local Chinese leadership. They come here to work for a few years and then return to their countries. They don't need to have leadership."

In 2017, Israel and China signed an agreement to bring some 6,000 Chinese construction workers to work in Israel.

=== Discrimination ===
While discrimination against Chinese people in Israel is not a common phenomenon, in 2001, then-labor and social affairs minister Shlomo Benizri said: "I just don't understand why a restaurant needs a slant-eye to serve me my meal", a comment which was called racist in the Israeli press.

In 2003, The Guardian claimed that Chinese workers at an unspecified company had been required to agree not to have sex with or marry Israeli women, including prostitutes, as a condition of getting a job. A police spokesperson said that there was nothing illegal about the requirement and that no investigation had been opened. Israeli lawyers, however, claim that these contracts violate Israeli law and would not be enforceable.

== See also ==
- Israelis in China
- China–Israel relations
