= Orjuwan =

Restaurant and nightclub in Ramallah

- Interactive map of Orjuwan
- Address: Ramallah
- Coordinates: 31°53′54″N 35°12′00″E
- Type: Restaurant; nightclub

Construction
- Opened: 2009

Orjuwan is an upscale restaurant and nightclub in Ramallah.

Orjuwan is located in the "fashionable" Ramallah neighborhood of Al-Masyoun. The restaurant was opened in 2009 by two brothers and a sister from the well-known Sakakini family, Sari, Salim; their sister, Katia. It offers an Italian-Palestinian fusion cuisine.

Co-owner Sari Sakakini told the New York Times, “We wanted to make five-star gourmet Palestinian food.” The restaurant's Italian-trained chefs, Iad Abu Khlaf and Samer Jadoun, are particularly proud of their fusion risottos. Their risotto al maklouba, is made with cauliflower, eggplant and spices.
