= Amos Yudan =

Israeli businessman

- עמוס יודן
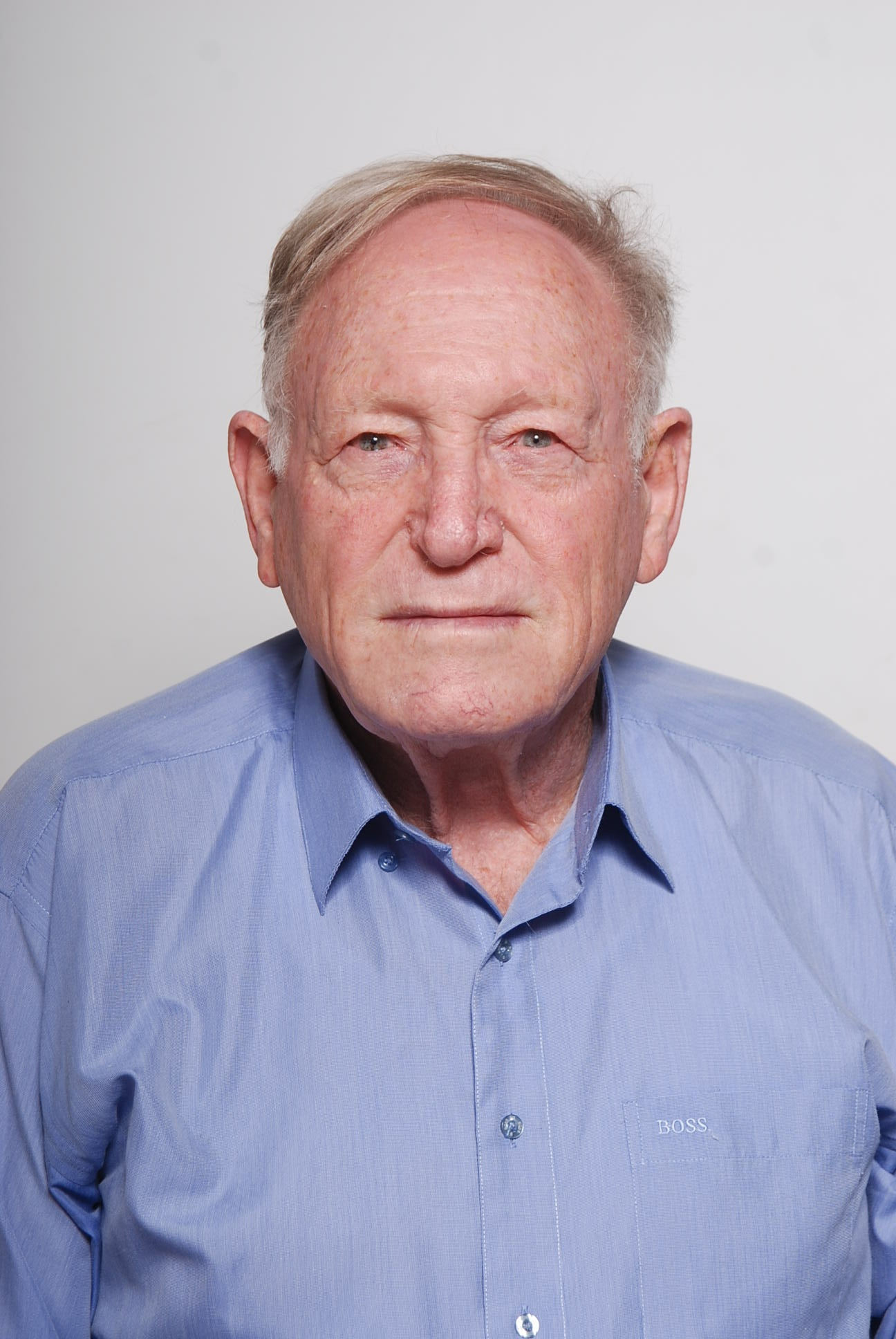
- Amos Yudan
- Born: November 5, 1936 (age 89); Haifa, Israel
- Education: Master of Science in economics
- Alma mater: Concordia University; Technion – Israel Institute of Technology
- Occupations: Chair & ceo of comodan
- Years active: 1956–present
- Spouse(s): Marriage, Carmela Yudan
- Children: Amit Yudan, Galit Ganor, Nitzan Yudan
- Relatives: Quirin Yudan, Gefen Ganor, Iris Yudan, Dekel Ganor, Dagan Ganor, Nadav Yudan, Roni Yudan

Amos Yudan (Hebrew: עמוס יודן; born November 5, 1936) is an Israeli businessman,. He is Chairman of the Israel-China and Hong Kong chamber of commerce and CEO of Comodan, a company that promotes Sino-Israeli business. Yudan was the first Israeli to initiate trade exchange with China in 1981.

== Early life ==
Yudan was born in Haifa, Israel to Walter and Chaya Yudenberg.

== Career ==
During the 80's, Yudan managed the International Trade Division of Koor Trade Corporation, and in 1984 initiated the first trade relationships with companies in China. In 1987 he was asked by Israeli prime minister Shimon Peres to set up the first official Government owned company (Copeco Ltd) to foster commercial activities between companies in China and Israel. The company was active until 1992, when Israel and China established diplomatic relations. During these years, Yudan led the first business delegations from Israel to China and managed the first joint projects in the field of Agriculture and Telecommunication.

In 1992, Yudan became CEO and President of Comodan Far East Ltd, which specialises in business development and trade between Israel and China. Yudan initiated and led numerous joint ventures, and implemented large scale projects of Israeli companies in China, and Chinese companies in Israel.

Yudan played an important role in the development of the Red Line section of Tel Aviv Light Rail.

== Recognition ==
- Life Achievement Prize of the Federation of Israeli Chambers of Commerce (FICC) (2011)
