= Al-Masyoun =

Neighborhood in Ramallah, Palestine

Al-Masyoun الماسيون
- Neighborhood
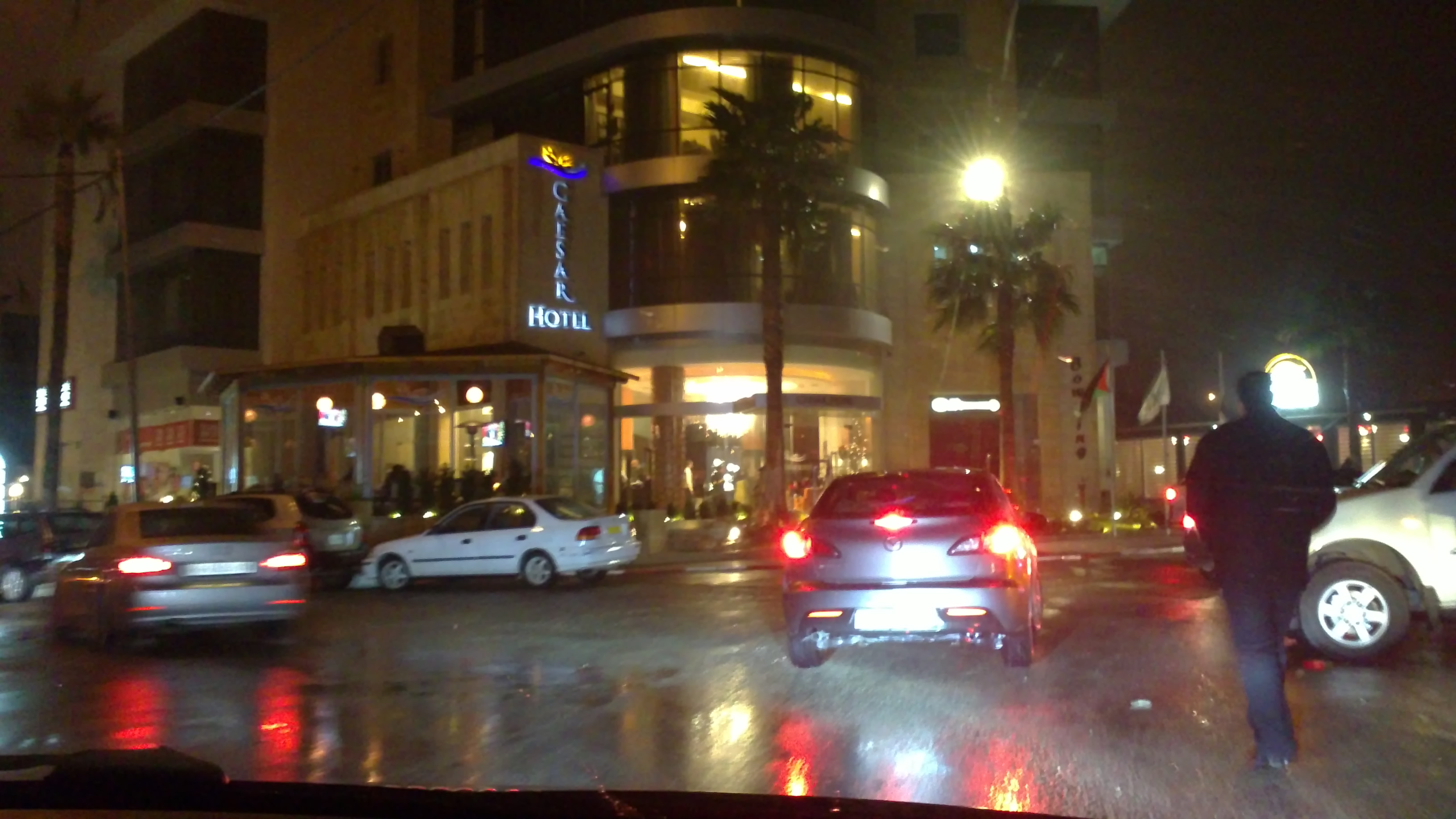
- Al-Masyoun neighborhood, Ramallah
- Interactive map of Al-Masyoun
- Location of Al-Masyoun in the West Bank
- Coordinates: 31.8896322°N 35.2006851°E
- Country: Palestine
- Governorate: Ramallah and al-Bireh Governorate
- City: Ramallah
- Time zone: UTC+2 (EET)
  - Summer (DST): UTC+3 (EEST)

Al-Masyoun (Arabic: الماسيون) is a residential neighborhood in Ramallah, located in the West Bank, Palestine. It is considered one of the city’s more upscale and modern districts.

In the first decade of the 21st century, Al-Masyoun experienced significant urban development, including new residential buildings, commercial centers, and upscale restaurants and cafés. The neighborhood also hosts several foreign diplomatic missions representing countries that recognize the State of Palestine.

== Diplomatic missions ==
Al-Masyoun is home to a number of foreign embassies and representative offices accredited to the State of Palestine, including:

- Embassy of China in Palestine.

== Gallery ==
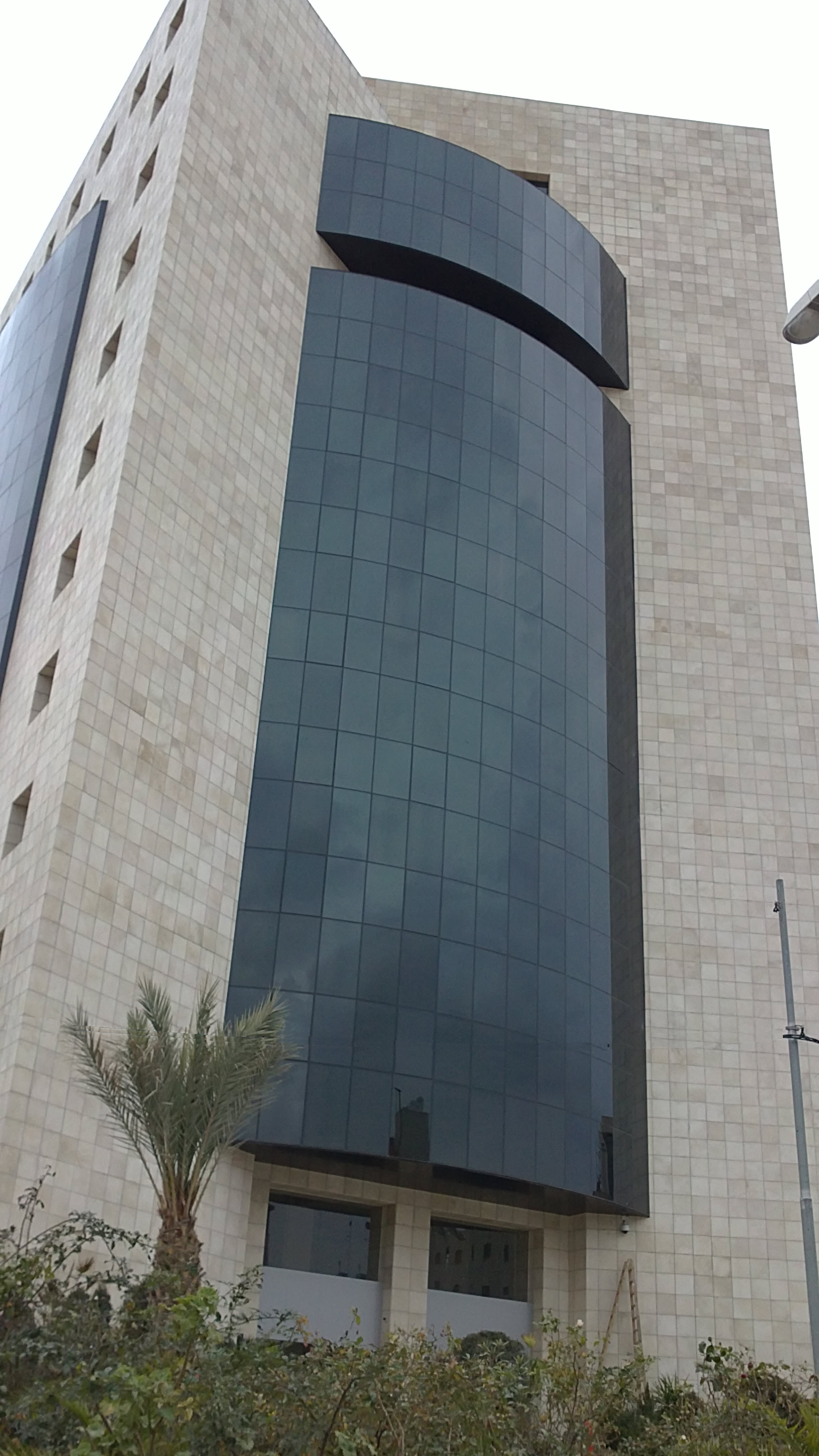
Al-Masyoun neighborhood

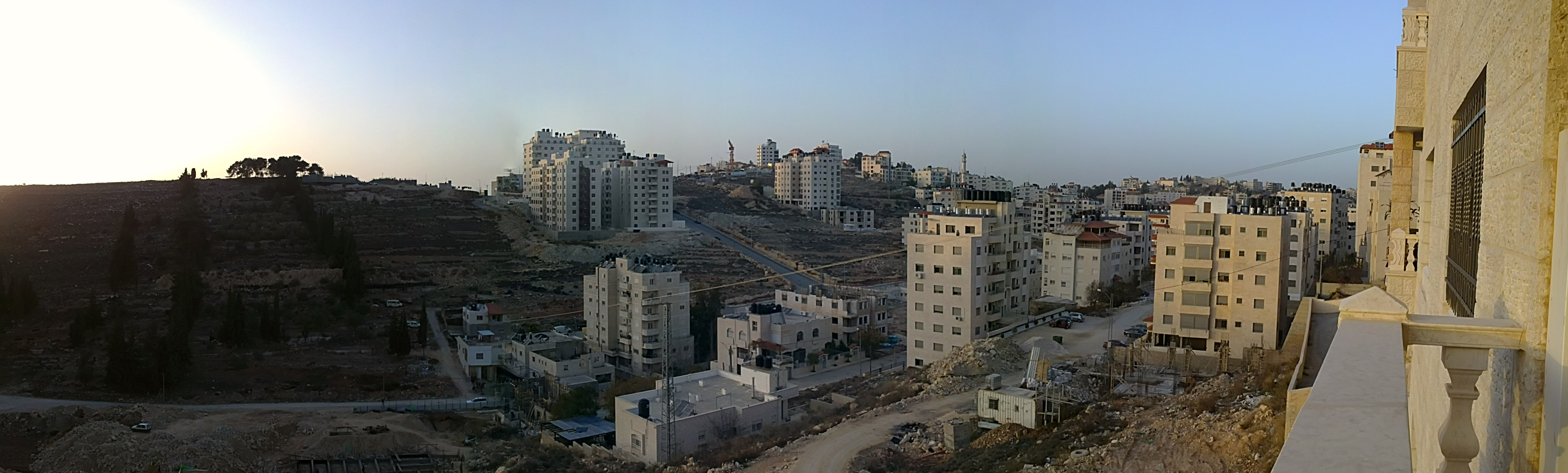
View of Al-Masyoun

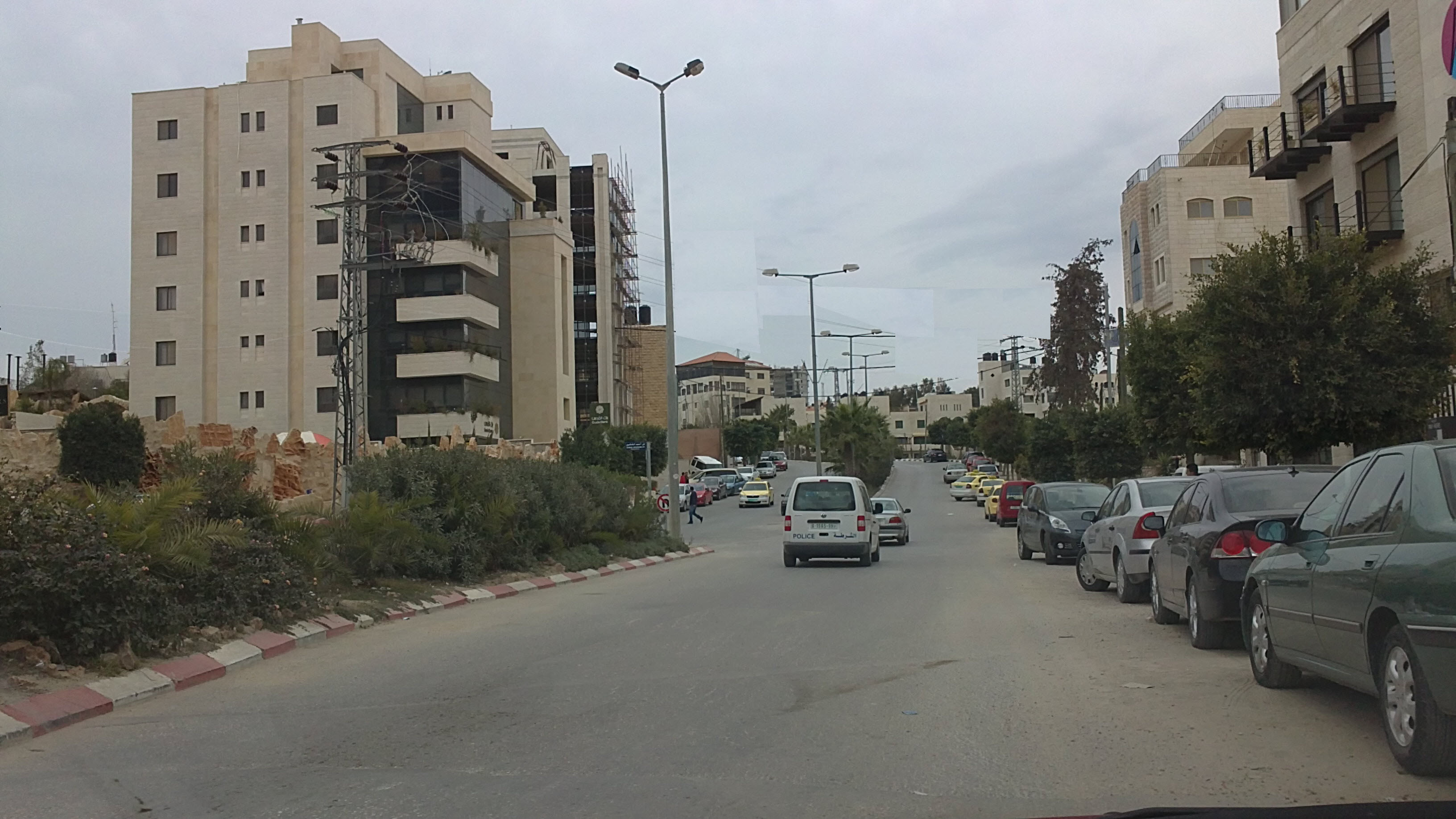
Street view in Al-Masyoun

== See also ==
- Ramallah
- Ramallah and al-Bireh Governorate
