= China–Palestine relations =

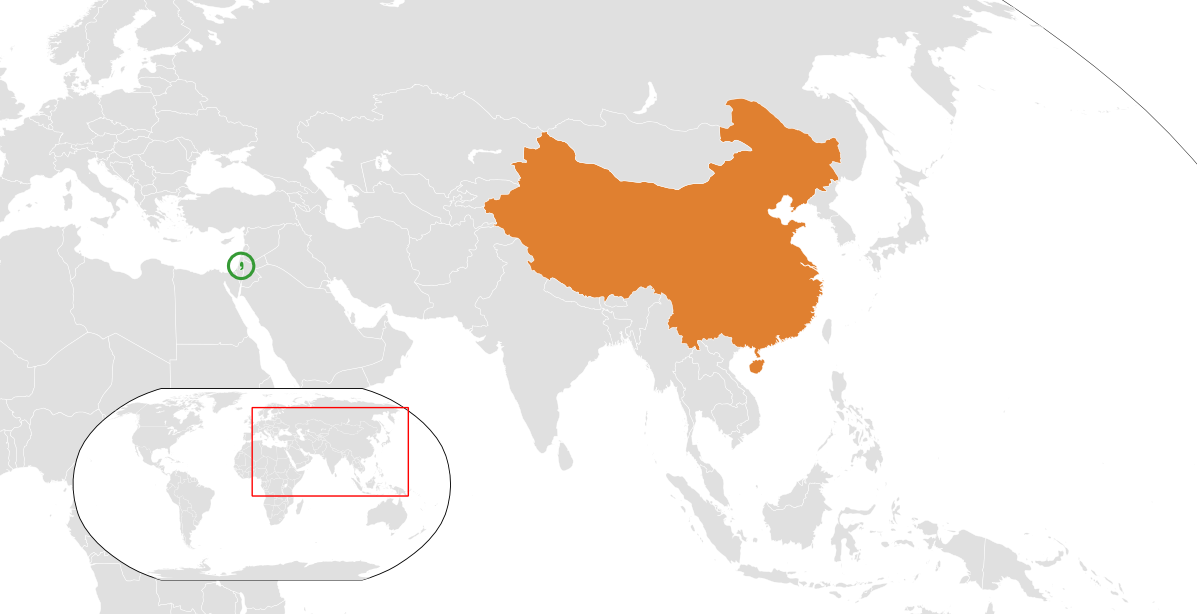

- Palestine: China

Diplomatic mission
- Embassy of Palestine, Beijing: Office of China, Ramallah

Envoy
- Ambassador Fariz Mehdawi: Ambassador Zeng Jixin

China–Palestine relations, also referred to as Sino–Palestinian relations, encompass the bilateral relationship between the People's Republic of China and Palestine dating back to the early years of the Cold War. China supports a two-state solution with the creation of a "sovereign and independent Palestinian state" based on the 1967 borders with East Jerusalem as its capital.

During the era of Mao Zedong, China's foreign policy was in support of Third World national liberation movements, with China extending support towards the Palestine Liberation Organization (PLO). In this period, China supported both Fatah, and smaller militant organizations such as the Popular Front for the Liberation of Palestine (PFLP) and the Democratic Front for the Liberation of Palestine (DFLP). In the post-Mao era, China continued to support the PLO in international forums, though it dropped its support for militant organizations. China has recognized the State of Palestine since 1988 and was one of the first countries to do so.

Palestinian leaders Yasser Arafat and Mahmoud Abbas both visited China in official capacities, and relations between the two countries have been considered as cordial. In an effort to maintain what it views as a balanced position and avoid alienating Hamas, China adheres to a policy of not referring to the group as a terrorist organization.

== History ==
After the victory of the Chinese Communist Party (CCP) in the Chinese Civil War in 1949, the People's Republic of China (PRC) was proclaimed under CCP chairman Mao Zedong. The PRC recognized the State of Israel, but during the 1950s and 1960s, the PRC began to support the Arabs and Palestinians. China began voicing support for Palestine at the 1955 Bandung Conference, at which Premier Zhou Enlai stated, "[T]here was a parallel between the problems of Palestine and Formosa; neither could be solved peacefully unless intervention by outside forces was excluded; China was suffering from the same problem as the Arab countries." In his closing statement at the conference, Zhou stated that China supported "the struggle of the Arab people of Palestine for human rights" and avoided condemning Israel as a state.

The 1960s and 1970 were a period of heightened PRC support for Palestine, including both diplomatic and material support, and in 1965 recognized the Palestine Liberation Organization (PLO) as the representative of the Palestinian people. China had also established close relations with the Fatah party as well. The CCP also supported Palestinian armed groups such as the Popular Front for the Liberation of Palestine (PFLP) as well as the Democratic Front for the Liberation of Palestine (DFLP).

In March 1965, Ahmad Shukeiri visited Beijing and negotiated the PLO's first arms agreement with China. According to some historical views, including statements by Yasser Arafat, China was the earliest non-Arab state supporter of the PLO. From 1965 to 1971, China held yearly military training for Palestinian fedayeen, including instruction in Mao Zedong Thought on guerilla warfare and people's war. The historical record regarding the extent of China's military support for the Palestinian liberation movements is unclear; Palestinian fedayeen leaders had reasons to exaggerate the significance of Chinese assistance, as did Arab, Israeli, and Western sources for different reasons.

The PLO established a diplomatic office in China on 22 March 1965. China provided formal diplomatic status to the PLO office in China. As the PLO's relations with China developed, it became involved in with Sino-Soviet split because China, having supplied arms to the PLO, sought diplomatic and rhetorical assistance from the PLO in return. China hoped that its support of Palestine would help improve its Middle Eastern ties while making the Soviet diplomatic position in the Middle East worse. Palestinian-Soviet relations also impacted Sino-Palestinian relations, as the Palestinian organizations sought help from China when the Soviet Union was more reserved. The PRC strongly supported Yasser Arafat and the PLO, providing arms and training.

Mao Zedong linked the existence of Israel to Taiwan, and described them as "bases of imperialism in Asia." In 1965, Mao stated:

Imperialism is afraid of China and the Arabs. Israel and Formosa are bases of Imperialism in Asia. You are the front gate of the great continent, and we are the rear. Their goal is the same ... Asia is the biggest continent in the world, and the West wants to continue exploiting it. The West does not like us, and we must understand this fact. The Arab battle against the West is the battle against Israel. So, boycott Europe and America.

During the early Cultural Revolution, China curtailed its diplomatic activities, including withdrawing its ambassadors from all of the Arab countries other than Egypt. China continued to maintain its diplomatic ties to the Palestinian organizations and other non-state groups which China also viewed as liberation groups.

After the PRC was admitted to the United Nations as a member in 1971, it continued to support the Palestinian cause. In 1971, China hosted a "Palestine International Week" which included public rallies, exhibitions, and documentary screenings on the Palestinian people; the Chinese People's Association for Friendship with Foreign Countries organized the event with the Arab League and PLO. An embassy of the PLO was opened in Beijing during the summer of 1974.

China supported the 1975 UN General Assembly Resolution 3379 which had equated Zionism with racism. The resolution was revoked with Resolution 4686 in 1991, which China did note vote in..

After the death of Mao Zedong in 1976 and the gradual rise of Deng Xiaoping to power, China reduced support for Palestinian militant groups, eventually cutting off support, and later supported the Camp David Accords in 1978. China still supported the Palestinians and their cause, albeit in a more limited fashion, and it strongly supported the 1988 Palestinian Declaration of Independence by Yasser Arafat in Algiers, Algeria despite the objections by both Israel and the United States. China recognised Palestine in 1988. It was one of the earliest states to do so.

China has assigned formal diplomatic staff to Palestine since 1990. Initially diplomatic affairs were conducted through the Chinese embassy in Tunisia. In December 1995, China has established a foreign office located in the Gaza Strip that acted as a de facto embassy and liaison office to the Palestinian Liberation Organization; however, the Ambassador to Tunisia continued to act as the main diplomatic officer to Palestine until 2008. In May 2004, the office, officially named Office of the People's Republic of China to the State of Palestine, was moved to Ramallah. The director of the office is accorded ambassadorial ranks in the Chinese foreign service.

== Contemporary relations ==
Under Deng's successors, China has continued its relations with both Israel and the Arab States. Under CCP general secretaries Jiang Zemin and Hu Jintao, China has supported the Middle East peace process and the Oslo Accords in principle. Yasser Arafat visited China on 14 occasions.

After the 2006 Palestinian legislative election, China referred to Hamas as the democratically elected representatives of the Palestinian people. China invited the Hamas Foreign Minister Mahmoud al-Zahar to attend the China-Arab Cooperation Forum in June 2006 ignoring protests by both the United States and Israel but received praise from Mahmoud Abbas. China continued to focus its Palestinian diplomacy with the PLO, however. Chinese contacts with Hamas decreased following Hamas' defeat of Fatah in the 2007 Battle of Gaza. As part of its view of maintaining a balanced posture and avoiding alienating Hamas, China's policy is to never label Hamas as a terrorist organization.

After the 2008–2009 Gaza War, Chinese Foreign Ministry spokesperson Qin Gang urged both parties to solve disputes through dialogue and denounces the use of military force in solving conflicts. After the 31 May, 2010 Gaza flotilla raid the Chinese Foreign Ministry spokesperson Ma Zhaoxu strongly condemned Israel and urged Israel to seriously implement the UN Security Council resolutions and to improve the situation in the Gaza Strip by lifting the blockade.

During the November 2012 Gaza War, a Chinese Foreign Ministry spokesperson told reporters in a news conference that China expressed "concern" to the clashes and urge all sides, particularly Israel, to display restraint and avoid civilian casualties. On 29 November 2012, China voted in favor of UN General Assembly Resolution 67/19 Palestine to non-member observer state status in the United Nations. In 2014, General Secretary of the Chinese Communist Party Xi Jinping stated that he supported Palestinian statehood.

During the 2014 Gaza War, Chinese Foreign Ministry spokesperson Hong Lei on 9 July 2014 in response to the violence said: "We believe that to resort to force and to counter violence with violence will not help resolve problems other than pile up more hatred. We urge relevant parties to bear in mind the broader picture of peace and the lives of the people, immediately realize a ceasefire, stick to the strategic choice of peace talks and strive for an early resumption of talks."

China voted in favor of UN Security Council Resolution 2334 condemning Israeli settlement building on the West Bank and typically takes positions sympathetic to the Palestinian cause at the United Nations. In early 2016, CCP general secretary Xi Jinping reasserted China's support for "the establishment of a Palestinian state with its capital being eastern Jerusalem" in a meeting with the Arab League. Xi also announced an aid project of 50 million yuan ($7.6 million) for a solar power stations in the Palestinian territories.

Chinese Foreign Minister Wang Yi called the lack of "an independent [Palestinian] state with full sovereignty" a "terrible injustice" in an April 2017 meeting between Palestinian Foreign Minister Riyad al-Maliki. Wang went on to say that China supports Palestinians' efforts to create an independent state based on the borders set before the 1967 Six-Day War as well as the establishment of its future capital in East Jerusalem. In July 2017, Xi delivered a further formalization of China's positions in his "Four Points" on the "issue of Israel-Palestine conflict", the first of which was that China supported the establishment of an independent, sovereign Palestine within the framework of the two-state solution based on the 1967 borders, with East Jerusalem as its capital.

In July 2019, Palestine was one of the 54 countries which issued a joint statement supporting China's policies in Xinjiang at the United Nations (UN). A year after in June 2020, Palestine also backed the Hong Kong national security law at the UN. After Palestinian ambassador to China Fariz Mehdawi visited Xinjiang in 2021, he praised China's upkeep of mosques on Chinese state media. Mehdaw's comments were criticised by Radio Free Asia journalist Shohret Hoshur who cited a past interview with Uyghur mother Patigul Ghulam saying the Uyghurs were in a worse situation than the Palestinians.

Palestine's President Mahmoud Abbas has visited China on five occasions as of June 2023 and has voiced support for Beijing's policies toward Muslim minorities in Xinjiang. During his fifth visit on 13 June 2023, he met with Chinese leader Xi Jinping and Chinese premier Li Qiang to discuss the latest developments in Palestine as well as other regional and international issues. China has stated its willingness to assist in facilitating peace talks between Israel and Palestine. During the trip, China announced a strategic partnership with the Palestinian Authority and Xi proposed a three-point proposal to solve the Israeli–Palestinian conflict, calling for a Palestinian state on the basis of 1967 borders, with East Jerusalem as its capital; humanitarian aid to Palestine; and the convening of a "larger, more authoritative, more influential international peace conference" to promote talks.

On 11 October early into Gaza war, China reiterated its support for a two-states solution and called for a ceasefire in the fighting. Following Russia and China's veto against a US draft resolution on 25 October in the UN Security Council, Hamas leader Ismail Haniyeh issued a statement praising the two countries' position. In January 2024, Israel reported that it discovered a stockpile of Chinese weaponry used by Hamas. The same month, China voiced support for South Africa's genocide case against Israel.

On 19 March 2024, Chinese Foreign Ministry ambassador Wang Kejian met with Hamas leader Ismail Haniyeh in Qatar, where they "exchanged views on the Gaza conflict and other issues". Following talks mediated by China, on 23 July 2024, Palestinian factions including Hamas and Fatah reached an agreement to end their divisions and form an interim unity government, which they announced in the "Beijing Declaration". The Palestinian reconciliation talks hosted by China generally increased international perceptions that China was a credible intermediary on these issues.

In August 2025, China officially referred to genocide in Gaza with the U.S. as an "accomplice" and called for the "imperative of an arm embargo on Israel." In November 2025, Xinhua News Agency and Wafa signed a cooperation agreement. On 31 December, Wafa reiterated Palestine's support of China's One-China policy and rejected "any interference in China's internal affairs." In October 2026, Wang Yi stated to Isaac Herzog that the "Palestinian question is the greatest historical injustice of this century" and reiterated support for a two-state solution.

=== Relations in the China-Arab States Cooperation Forum ===
Throughout the development of China-Arab States Cooperation Forum, Arab states have urged China to use the forum to strengthen its support for Palestine; CASCF's statements of support for Palestine have grown stronger over time.

CASCF's founding declaration in 2004 states, "China stresses support for the Middle Eastern peace process, land for peace principle and the Beirut Summit Arab Peace Initiative." The action plan from the 2004 summit called for strengthening the UN's peace process role and an independent state for Palestinians. The 2008 CASCF declaration went further, calling on Israel to end the occupation of lands occupied since 1967, for the work of the international community to lift the blockade on Palestinians, and for Israel to stop building settlements. In response to united pressure from the Arab states, CASCF agreed in 2010 to call specifically for an end of Israel's occupation in East Jerusalem. The 2012 CASCF declaration called for Palestine to become a full member of the UN and of UNESCO.

Subsequent CASCF declarations have echoed these positions. The 2018 declaration calls on all states to implement UN Security Council Resolution 2334 (2016) (which condemns measures designed to change the demographic make-up of occupied Palestinian territory, including East Jerusalem) and explicitly criticizes the United States for moving its embassy in Israel to Jerusalem.

During the 2024 CASCF Summit, Xi stated that a two-state solution must be upheld and that war must not continue indefinitely. China pledged a further US$69 million in emergency humanitarian relief for Palestine and US$3 million to the United Nations Relief and Works Agency for Palestine Refugees in the Near East.

== Economic relations ==
Palestine and China began negotiating a free trade agreement in 2019. The discussions coincided with China's beginning of free trade agreement negotiations with Israel. According to academic Dawn C. Murphy, China likely proceeded concurrently with both countries in order to avoid perceptions of favoritism. As of 2022, Palestine and China had not yet concluded their free trade agreement discussions.

== Public opinion ==
A survey published in 2026 by the Pew Research Center found that 57% of West Bank and East Jerusalem residents had a favorable view of China, while 27% had an unfavorable view.

== See also ==
- Foreign relations of China
- Foreign relations of Palestine
