= Pixellot =

Software development company

- Industry: software development, sports video creation
- Founded: 2013
- Founder: Gal Oz, Dr. Miky Tamir
- Headquarters: Israel
- Website: https://www.pixellot.tv/

Pixellot is a software development company focused on creation of automatic video and analytics for the sports market. It partners with leagues, football clubs, and federations worldwide, including MLB, colleges, CCAA, and high schools, NFHS, FC Barcelona, and serves broadcasters, such as ESPN.

The company is headquartered in Israel, with offices in Atlanta, Georgia, and Durham, North Carolina.

== History ==
Pixellot was founded in 2013 in Israel by Gal Oz and Dr. Miky Tamir. In 2016, Pixellot partnered with Prozone, a Stats Perform company, to provide automated video production technology to English Premier Leagues clubs globally.

In 2018, Pixellot and PlayOn! Sports partnered to bring automated sports production to U.S. high school sports, such as broadcast school events on the NFHS Network.

In 2019, Pixellot acquired VidSwap, a sports video analysis and editing platform. In 2021, the company launched Pixellot Air, an automated recording and video analysis camera, designed with FC Barcelona. At the same time, the company signed a partnership with FloSports, the streaming service for live digital sports and original content, to provide AI-Automated Technology for over 700 games live on FloHoops.com.

In April 2022, Pixellot partnered with Genius Sports Limited, a sports technology company, for streaming distribution and distributing Pixellot's camera systems to leagues and federations across more than a hundred competitions worldwide.

Pixellot AI-based technology served Spanish Ice Sports Federation, China Sports Media, Argentine Football Association, Grupo Globo – Latin America's largest media group in Brazil, NTT West and Asahi Broadcasting Group HD in Japan, the Croatian Basketball Federation and Israeli Basketball Association, Chile's National Football Association, National Federation of State High School Associations, etc.

In October 2022, Pixellot together with Whistle Sports Network launched the original series, "My First Coach", hosted by Dell Curry.

Pixellot raised over $200 million in funding through four rounds: $3 million in 2014, $30 million in 2018, $16 million in 2020, and $161 million in June 2022.

In March 2023 Pixellot signed a multi-year deal with Chinese company Baidu to install 6,000 systems across China.

In September 2023 Pixellot signed a strategic partnership with the Portuguese Football Federation.

In October 2026, Pixellot launched their partnership with Basketball Australia to stream games online. But some venues were using the technology in June, months before the announcement, including for children's games. The streaming website claims children's games are private by default. But an independent investigation discovered that domestic violence victims were put at risk from filming, and video of children's games were available to a newly created account on the platform. Players (or their parents) had not given explicit, informed consent to be filmed, or have the video transferred or stored overseas. A mandatory fee will be charged to all players from next season.

An August 2026 analysis by privacy experts raised similar concerns, including pedophiles accessing images and video of children published online. The proposed model limited access to players, parents, and coaches, however, a later investigation found videos of children's games were freely available after account creation.
