= List of ambassadors of Palestine to China =

Coordinates: 39.937704°N 116.460642°E

Ambassador of the State of Palestine to China
- Incumbent; Jawad Awad since November 14, 2025
- Inaugural holder: Moustapha Saphariny
- Formation: July 29, 1992

The Palestinian ambassador in Beijing is the official representative of the Palestinian government to the Government of China.

== List of representatives ==
Diplomatic agrément/Diplomatic accreditation	ambassador	Observations	President of Palestine	Premier of the People's Republic of China	Term end
November 20, 1988		The governments in Beijing and Ramallah established mutual recognition.	Yasser Arafat	Li Peng	
July 29, 1992	Moustapha Saphariny		Yasser Arafat	Li Peng	
November 22, 2002	Zakaria Ibrahim Abdul-Rahim		Yasser Arafat	Zhu Rongji	
December 28, 2005	Diab Nemer Mohammed Allouh		Mahmoud Abbas	Wen Jiabao	
December 1, 2010	Ahmad Abbas M. Ramadan		Mahmoud Abbas	Wen Jiabao	
May 17, 2016	Fariz Mehdawi	From 2006 to 2016 he was Palestinian Ambassador to Indonesia.	Mahmoud Abbas	Li Keqiang	
2024	Shadi Abu Zarqa	(Acting)	Mahmoud Abbas	Li Qiang	
November 14, 2025	Jawad Awad		Mahmoud Abbas	Li Qiang	

- People's Republic of China Ambassador to the Palestinian National Authority
