= Hong Kong–Israel relations =

- Israel: Hong Kong

Hong Kong–Israel relations refer to relations between Hong Kong and Israel. Israel has a consulate in Hong Kong, while Hong Kong is represented through the Hong Kong Economic and Trade Office in addition to the Chinese embassy in Tel Aviv.

== History ==
In 1958, the businessman Victor Zirinsky was appointed Israel's Honorary Consul in Hong Kong and served in this capacity until Israel's diplomatic presence was formally established in 1985, when Reuven Merhav was appointed to be the Consul General as a joint representative for Hong Kong and Macau.

Hong Kong's interest in Israeli high-tech start-ups has led to increasing economic ties between the two entities. InvestHK, a department of the Hong Kong Government, has stated it will help Israeli expatriate entrepreneurs set up operations in the city. Promising Israeli start-ups are enrolled in a business incubator and accelerator program called StartMeUpHK that offers investments of $500,000, a trip to Hong Kong, mentorship programs with East Asian business executives, and admission to major high-tech entrepreneurship and investment events hosted in the region.

In 2013, Hong Kong billionaire Li Ka-shing donated $130 million to the Technion-Israel Institute of Technology.

In 2015, Israel signed an agreement with Hong Kong to increase cooperation in technology and R&D. A new program was established for projects focusing on research and development in the industrial sector. In Hong Kong, entrepreneurs receive funding through the ESS (Enterprise Support Scheme) program, managed by the Innovation and Technology Fund (ITF); in Israel, funding is granted by the Office of the Chief Scientist at the Israeli Ministry of Economy and Industry and the program is managed by the Office of the Chief Scientist, the Israeli Industry Center for Research and Development (MATIMOP).

The Speaker of the Israeli parliament, Yuli Edelstein, traveled to Hong Kong in 2016 to strengthen the burgeoning ties between Israel and Hong Kong. He hailed the good ties between the two entities.

== Tourism and transportation ==
According to the Hong Kong Secretary for Commerce and Economic Development, who visited Israel in November 2016, Israel is Hong Kong's largest visitor source market in the Middle East. Some 64,000 Israelis traveled to Hong Kong in 2015.

Cathay Pacific, Hong Kong's flag carrier, inaugurated flights from Hong Kong to Tel Aviv in March 2017. However, the airline's flights between the two cities were cancelled in December 2023, following deteriorating situations in Israel due to the Gaza war.

== Controversy ==
In 2017, at a mass gathering of Hong Kong police officers and supporters after the beating of Ken Tsang, a speaker compared the public insults on police with the persecution of Jews during World War II. While the two cases are hardly comparable, the Israeli consulate on 23 February 2017 expressed regret over the speaker's comment. In response, a Hong Kong police force spokesman replied that the remarks did not represent the force.

== See also ==
- Foreign relations of Israel
