= Tonara (company) =

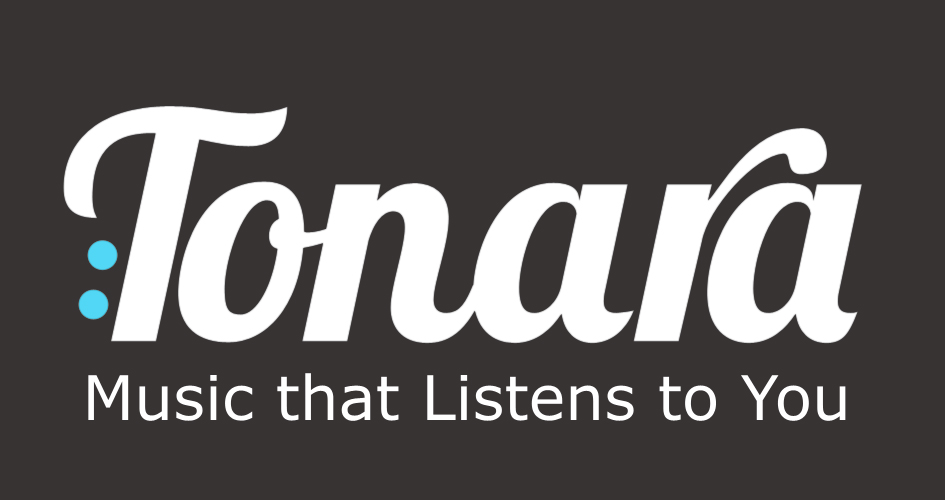
- Industry: Software
- Founded: 2008
- Founder: Yair Lavi; Evgeni Begelfor
- Defunct: December 8, 2023
- Headquarters: Ramat Gan, Israel
- Website: tonara.com

Tonara was an Israeli education and technology company that developed sheet music software of the same name. It allows music teachers to track the practice sessions of their students.

== Software ==
Tonara software is capable of acoustic polyphonic score following, showing the musician's real-time position on the score, and turning the pages automatically as the player reaches the end of a page. The software was initially launched as an iPad application in September 2011. The application includes several free music scores, and additional music scores can be acquired through in-app purchasing. The application also enables users to record their performances, and share them with friends. The Tonara app was discontinued and shut down on December 8th, 2023.

=== Wolfie ===
Wolfie was an app developed by Tonara for teaching music. It had the ability to track a student's practicing and set targets for them. On the student's side, it featured the ability to record your playing to share with the teacher, rewards for practicing, and Tonara's Magic Cursor technology for automatic page turning. The app was merged with the main Tonara app in 2017 and added a chat functionality for communication with the teacher.

== Reception ==
Tonara was launched as an iPad application during the TechCrunch Disrupt conference in San Francisco, on September 12, 2011. The presentation on stage included a live string quartet and a vocal performance by Randi Zuckerberg accompanied by Piano, all of them using Tonara. After its launch, CNN included Tonara in its "Startup stars" coverage of the Battlefield, The Guardian called it "very clever" and Wired magazine described it as “sheet music for the iPad generation… It’s pretty clear that something interactive like this will do to sheet music what Kindle did to hardback books". In October 2011, it was selected by Apple as "App of the Week" in China, Germany, Austria and Switzerland.

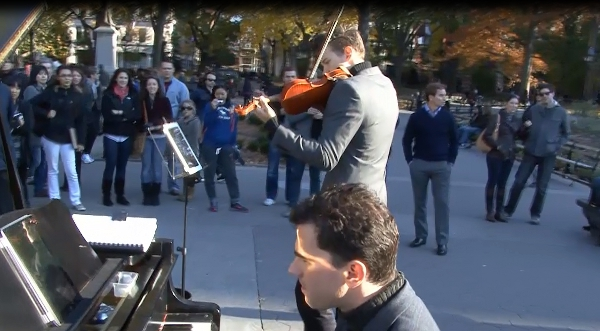
The first all-Tonara concert

The first all-Tonara concert took place on November 12, 2011, in New York's Washington Square Park. Two pianists and one violinist played a complete concert repertoire including pieces by Beethoven, Brahms, Bach and Chopin, all from the Tonara store.

== See also ==
- List of music software
