= Israelis in China =

Israelis in China, as compared to other foreign communities, are not large in number. There are at most a few hundred in each of a few major cities, and possibly more scattered around in other locations outside the major cities.

== Beijing ==
Roughly 130 Israelis were reported to live in Beijing in 2005. In 2005, the Israeli embassy to China held their Hanukkah celebrations at the Great Wall of China, the first such celebration in Chinese history.

== Shanghai ==
Shanghai's Israeli community may be the largest in mainland China. In 1995, when the Israeli consulate opened, only two Israelis lived in the city. However, by 2003 that number had grown to 70, and by 2005 over 200 Israelis were registered as living in Shanghai. The city also boasts an Israeli restaurant run by a husband-and-wife team from Israel who came with their three sons which is considered something of a gathering point for the city's Israeli community; the Israeli consul is also known to frequent the restaurant.

Many Israelis in Shanghai are involved in the diamond industry. Most notable among them is Sara Imas, a former Chinese citizen with a German Jewish father and Jiangsu mother, who was born and raised in China and later recognized by former Israeli Prime Minister Yitzhak Rabin as the first Jewish immigrant from China to Israel. Imas later returned to Shanghai as the representative of a diamond company after gaining Israeli citizenship and living in Israel for 12 years.

== Hong Kong ==
The Israeli community in Hong Kong is larger than those of Beijing and Shanghai combined.

== See also ==
- China–Israel relations
- Kaifeng Jews
- History of the Jews in China
