= Eli Marom =

Israeli general (born 1955)

Eliezer Marom
- אליעזר מרום
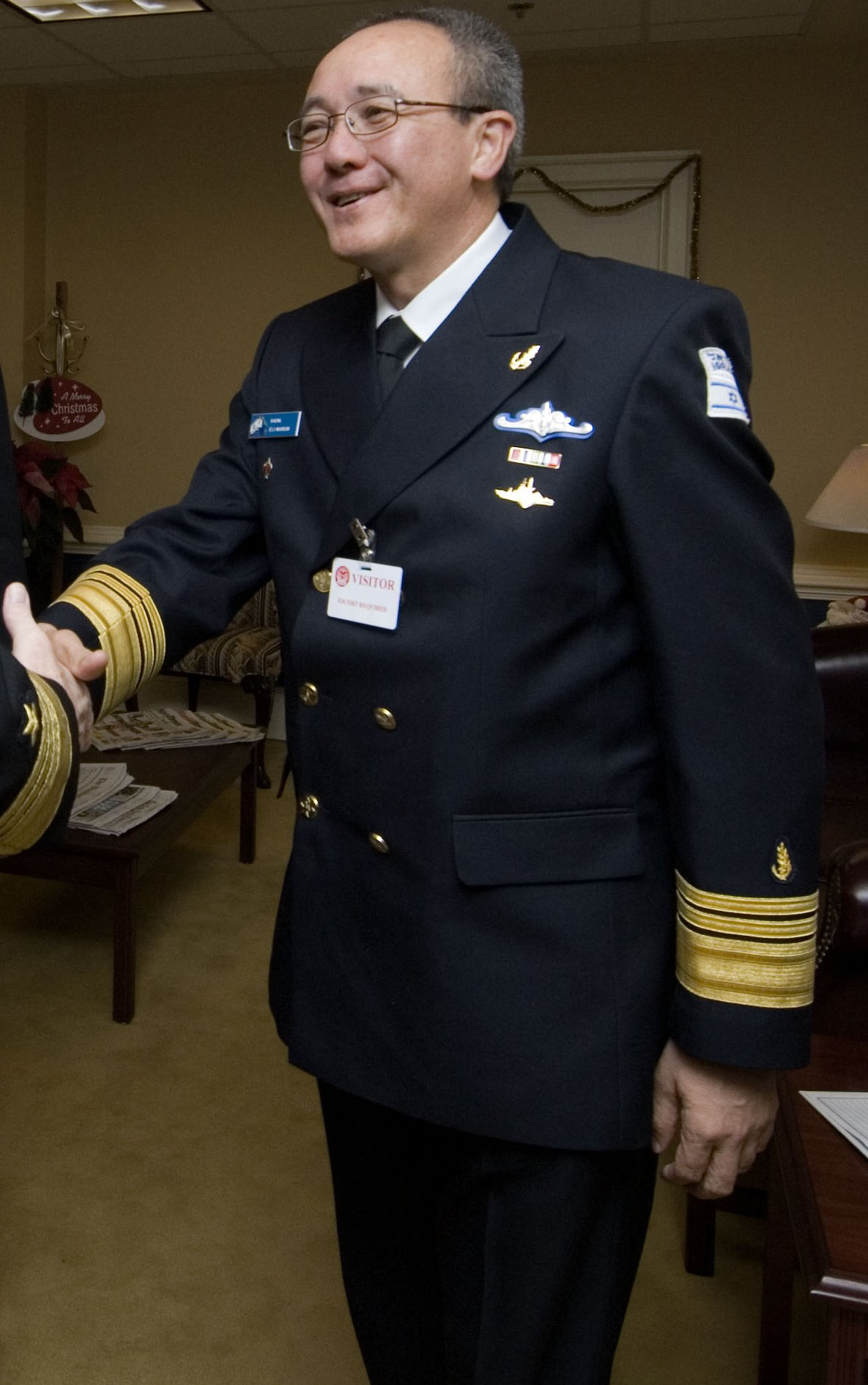
- Eli Marom, 2007
- Born: November 13, 1955 (age 70); Sde Eliezer, Upper Galilee, Israel
- Military career
- Allegiance: Israel
- Branch: Israeli Navy
- Rank: Aluf (Rear Admiral)
- Nickname: Chiney
- Commands: Commander of a Missile Boat, Commander F.M.B. (First Missile Boat) Squadron, Commander of the Advanced Naval Command Course, Head of Operational Intelligence Department, Commander of the F.M.B. Flotilla, Commander of the Haifa Naval Base and the North Arena, Chief of Staff of the Israel Navy, IDF representative at the United States Joint Forces Command, Defense and Armed Forces Attaché in Singapore, Commander in Chief of the Israel Navy
- Conflicts: 1982 Lebanon War; First Intifada; South Lebanon conflict (1985–2000); Second Intifada; Karine A Affair; Francop Affair

Eliezer "Eli" Marom "Chayni" (Hebrew: אליעזר "אלי" מרום "צ'ייני"; born 1955) is the former Commander of the Israeli Navy serving from 2007 to 2011. From 2015 to 2019 he served as chair of the Israel Airports Authority.

Born in Sde Eliezer, Israel, Marom is partly of Chinese descent. He held the rank of Aluf in the Israeli Navy.

== Early life and family ==
Marom was born and raised on moshav Sde Eliezer, in the Hula Valley, and was named after the moshav. His father Erik was a German-born Jew and his mother Leah (originally Chai Li) was born in China, the daughter of a Russian-Jewish woman and a Han Chinese man who had converted to Judaism. His parents met when his father escaped to China as a refugee from Europe during World War II. The family immigrated to Israel in 1955 and spent several month in an immigration camp before moving to Sde Eliezer. Marom was the seventh of his parents' eight children and was born weeks after his family immigrated to Israel.

Marom studied Marine Engineering in the Israel Nautical College in Akko. While he studied there, one of his commanders called him "Chayni" (Hebrew: "Chinese; Chinaman") because of his eyes, and that became his nickname. He began his career in the Israeli Navy in 1975 after completing a naval officers course.

== Career ==
Over the course of his career, Marom has held most of the senior positions in the Israeli Navy. According to Haaretz, Marom is widely praised for his abilities as a commander, but concerns about his character led to him being passed over as head of the Navy in 2004. However, Marom was finally appointed to the post in 2007. He was charged with rehabilitating the Navy after the 2006 Lebanon War, in the wake of a Hezbollah missile strike on INS Hanit.

In March 2009, Marom was embroiled in a scandal after he was caught partying at a strip club in Tel Aviv. MK Nachman Shai called for Marom's resignation and IDF Chief of Staff Gabi Ashkenazi verbally rebuked him for his behavior. Ashkenazi did not, however, attach a reprimand to Marom's personal file.

Marom was still head of the navy during the 2010 Gaza flotilla raid. In June 2011, as the Free Gaza Movement was preparing to launch Freedom Flotilla II to Gaza, Marom was quoted as calling the action a 'hate flotilla'.

After leaving the navy in 2011, he became involved in many projects, and serves as senior director at Seagull Maritime Security.

In October 2013, he was briefly detained for questioning over his role in the Gaza flotilla raid when he arrived at Heathrow Airport, during a visit to the United Kingdom. In June 2025, he described Israel’s handling of the Gaza Freedom Flotilla as a failure, arguing that it should have been resolved through diplomacy rather than military action, as had been done in previous cases. Marom emphasized his view that the Gaza blockade, imposed in 2009 and "recognized by the whole world", is essential to Israel’s security. He warned that allowing the ship through undermined the blockade and could open the door to Iranian vessels reaching Gaza within months.

In February 2015, he was appointed as Chairman of the Israeli Airports Authority.

== Personal life ==
Eliezer Marom is married to Ora and has three children.

== Timeline ==
- Israel Navy Advanced Command Course
- National Defense College
- U.S. Navy Senior International Defense Management Program
- Harvard Business School
- MA in Social Sciences from Haifa University
- 1975 Joins Israeli Navy as Engine Officer
- 1999 promoted as Rear Admiral and appointed Commander of the Haifa Naval Base and the North Arena
- 2001 appointed the Head of Naval Operations of the Israel Navy
- 2003 appointed Chief of Staff of the Israel Navy
- 2004-2005 IDF representative at the United States Joint Forces Command.
- August 2005 appointed Defense Armed Forces Attache at the Embassy of Israel in Singapore
- October 9, 2007 promoted to vice admiral and Commander in Chief of the Israel Navy.
