= Pavlos D. Vasileiadis =

Biblical scholar

Dr. Pavlos D. Vasileiadis
- Παύλος Δ. Βασιλειάδης
- Born: 11 January 1974 (age 52); Thessaloniki, Central Macedonia, Greece
- Occupations: teacher, researcher, translator, author
- Known for: research on the Tetragrammaton

Academic background
- Education: Aristotle University of Thessaloniki
- Thesis: The sacred Tetragrammaton and its reception in the Medieval literature: A study on the translation of the Hebrew theonymy with special emphasis on two Bible translations (2017)
- Doctoral advisor: Miltiadis Konstantinou
- Other advisors: Johannes Karavidopoulos, Petros Vassiliadis, Anna Koltsiou-Nikita, Ioannis Mourtzios

Academic work
- Discipline: Biblical Studies
- Institutions: Ministry of Education and Religious Affairs (Greece)
- Main interests: Tetragrammaton, Bible versions in Greek
- Influenced: https://www.academia.edu/34834209/
- Website: https://orcid.org/0000-0002-6529-9512

Pavlos D. Vasileiadis (Greek: Παύλος Δ. Βασιλειάδης; born 1974 in Thessaloniki) is a Greek biblical scholar. His research is focused on biblical theology and biblical translation, with emphasis on the textual criticism of the New Testament and the research of the diachronic reception of the Tetragrammaton in Greek literature. He has been a contributor to the Μεγάλη Ορθόδοξη Χριστιανική Εγκυκλοπαίδεια (MOXE) [Great Orthodox Christian Encyclopedia]. For over two decades he has been an educational professional in the field of information technology.

== Education and research ==
Vasileiadis got a B.A. degree in IT Engineering from the International Hellenic University (as it is currently named) of Thessaloniki (1996) and one in Theology from the Aristotle University of Thessaloniki (2011). In 2013 he obtained a M.Th. degree in the field of Biblical Literature and Religion, on the subject of the Comma Johanneum, under the supervision of Petros B. Vassiliadis.

In 2017, he defended his doctoral dissertation in Biblical Literature and Religion from the Aristotle University of Thessaloniki, entitled The sacred Tetragrammaton and its reception in the Medieval literature: A study on the translation of the Hebrew theonymy with special emphasis on two Bible translations, under the supervision of Miltiadis Konstantinou. He further advanced his study on the biblical name of God by his postdoctoral research at the same university, where he submitted his conclusions in 2020 under the title The rendering of the Tetragrammaton in Greek in the holy Scriptures and other literature: A study on the diachronic reception and development of the Hebrew theonymy. Since 2022, he is a research fellow at the Institute for Hebrew Bible Manuscript Research (IHBMR).

For the project of translating the Septuagint in Modern Greek, he participated in the Hellenic Bible Society Translation Training Seminars, coordinated by the Nida Institute for Biblical Scholarship at the American Bible Society, the Hellenic Bible Society, and the Faculty of Theology of the Aristotle University of Thessaloniki during the years 2012–2014. He studied palaeography at the Centre for Byzantine Research. He is a member of the European Association of Biblical Studies (EABS), the International Organization for Septuagint and Cognate Studies (IOSCS), and the Society of Biblical Literature (SBL).

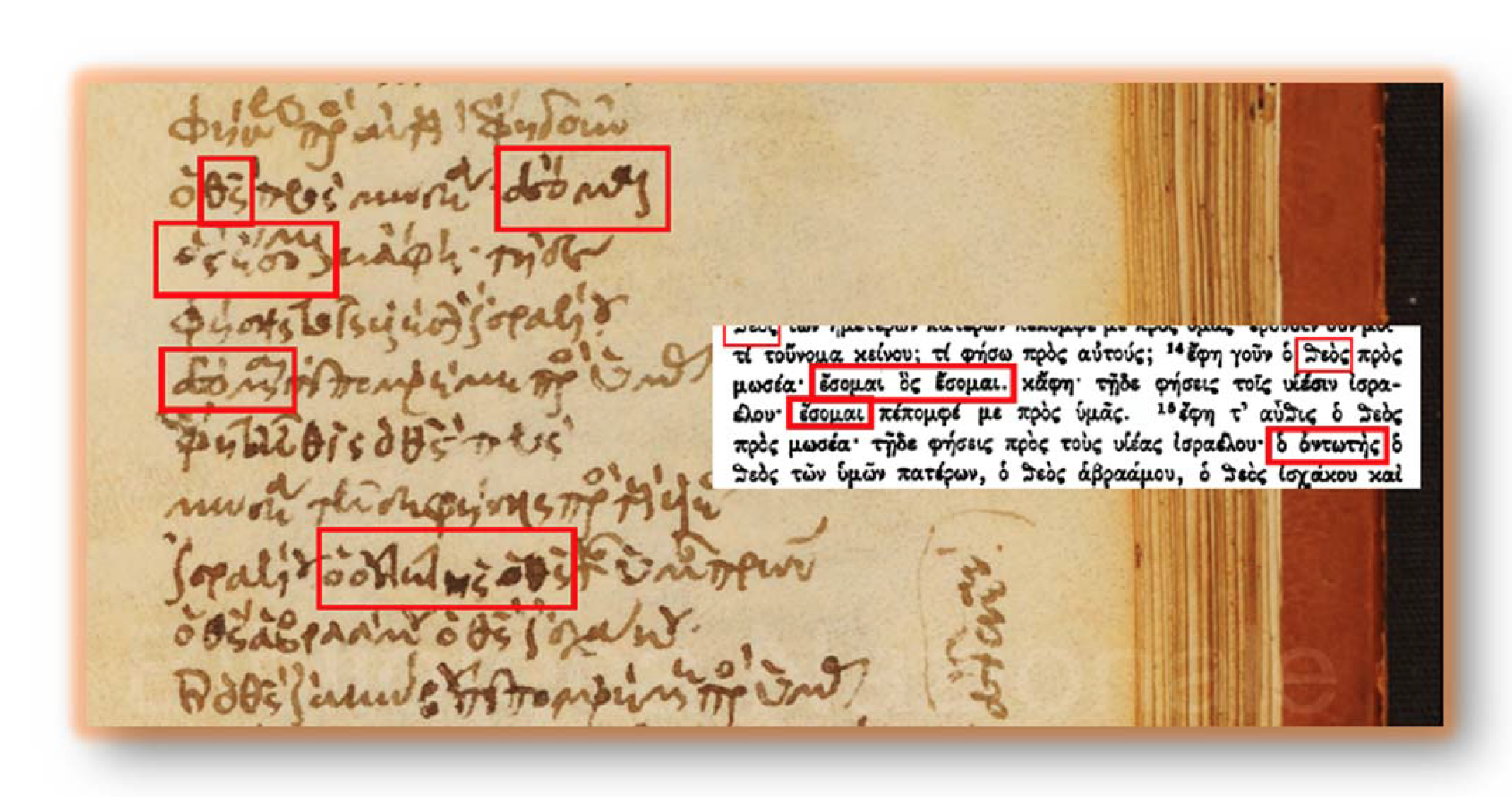
Exodus 3:14, 15 in Codex Marcianus gr. 7, as appears in Vasileiadis's doctoral dissertation (p. 65).

In 2022, he earned a MSc degree in Web Intelligence from the International Hellenic University, with his thesis entitled Intelligent Digital Assistants: A survey and overview of the current state of the art.

He was a member of the advisory board in the Twentieth Century Religious Thought Library, a multivolume, cross-searchable online collection that brings together the seminal works and archival materials related to worldwide religious thinkers from the early 1900s until the first decade of the 21st century, published by Alexander Street/ProQuest.

His research includes the rendering of the Tetragrammaton in the Syriac Old and New Testaments, the history and quality characteristics of the translations of the New Testament in Modern Greek, and the transcription and translation of Medieval Greek Bible versions.

== Bibliography ==
=== Theses ===
- Βασιλειάδης, Παύλος Δ. (2013). Κόμμα Ιωάννου (Α' Ιωάννη 5:7, 8): Μελέτη στην παρεμβολή και στην απομάκρυνσή του από το Βιβλικό κείμενο [Comma Johanneum (1 John 5:7, 8): A study on its interpolation and removal from the Biblical text] (MTh). Aristotle University of Thessaloniki, Greece. doi:10.26262/heal.auth.ir.132539.
- ——— (2017). Το ιερό Τετραγράμματο και η πρόσληψή του στη μεσαιωνική γραμματεία: Μελέτη στη μεταφραστική απόδοση της εβραϊκής θεωνυμίας με έμφαση σε δύο βιβλικές μεταφράσεις [The sacred Tetragrammaton and its reception in the Medieval literature: A study on the translation of the Hebrew theonymy with special emphasis on two Bible translations.] (PhD). Aristotle University of Thessaloniki, Greece. doi:10.26262/heal.auth.ir.292178.
- ——— (2020). Η απόδοση του Τετραγράμματου στα Ελληνικά στις ιερές Γραφές και την υπόλοιπη γραμματεία: Μελέτη στη διαχρονική πρόσληψη και εξέλιξη της εβραϊκής θεωνυμίας [The rendering of the Tetragrammaton in Greek in the holy Scriptures and other literature: A study on the diachronic reception and development of the Hebrew theonymy] (Post-Doc). Aristotle University of Thessaloniki, Greece. doi:10.5281/zenodo.4302702.
- ——— (2022). Ευφυείς Ψηφιακοί Βοηθοί: Συστηματική καταγραφή και κριτική παρουσίαση της τρέχουσας κατάστασης [Intelligent Digital Assistants: A survey and overview of the current state of the art] (MSc). International Hellenic University; Thessaloniki, Greece. doi:10.5281/zenodo.6791288.

=== Books ===
- Βασιλειάδης, Παύλος Δ. (2012). Κόμμα Ιωάννου: Μια προσέγγιση στη γνησιότητά του βάσει της κριτικής τού κειμένου και της ερμηνευτικής του [Comma Johanneum: An approach to its genuineness on the basis of textual criticism and its interpretation] (in Greek). Εκδόσεις Π. Πουρναράς. doi:10.5281/zenodo.4262411. ISBN 9789602425091.
- ——— (2025). Η Καινή Διαθήκη στη Δημοτική: Η ευόδωση ενός μακραίωνου αγώνα [The New Testament in Modern Greek: The culmination of a centuries-long struggle] (in Greek). Εκδόσεις Φυλάτος. ISBN 9789606583841.

=== Journal articles and book chapters ===
- Βασιλειάδης, Παύλος (2012). "Το ιερό Τετραγράμματο: Μια ιστορική και φιλολογική προσέγγιση του ονόματος του Θεού" [The sacred Tetragrammaton: A historical and philological approach to God's name]. Δελτίο Βιβλικών Μελετών (in Greek). 28 (1): 82–107. ISSN 1012-2311.
- Vasileiadis, Pavlos (1 December 2013). "The pronunciation of the sacred Tetragrammaton: An overview of a nomen revelatus that became a nomen absconditus". Judaica Ukrainica. 2. National University of Kyiv-Mohyla Academy: 5–20. ISSN 2305-4034.
- ——— (29 January 2015). "Aspects of rendering the sacred Tetragrammaton in Greek". Open Theology. 1 (1): 56–88. doi:10.2478/opth-2014-0006. ISSN 2300-6579. OCLC 927128789.
- ——— (2017). "The god Iao and his connection with the Biblical God, with special emphasis on the manuscript 4QpapLXXLevb". Vetus Testamentum et Hellas. 4. Aristotle University of Thessaloniki, Greece: School of Pastoral and Social Theology: 21–51. ISSN 2459-2552. OCLC 1085412017.
- ——— (2017). "Ісус, Новий Завіт І Священна Тетраграма" [Jesus, the New Testament, and the sacred Tetragrammaton]. In Теслюк, Галини (ed.). "Слово – живе й діяльне" (Євр 4:12): Біблійні дослідження, Захід і Схід: підходи, виклики та перспективи (in Ukrainian). Lviv, Ukraine: Ukrainian Catholic University. pp. 125–166. ISBN 9789662778908.
- ——— (30 November 2019). "Exodus 3:14 as an explanation of the Tetragrammaton: What if the Septuagint rendering had no Platonic nuances?". Biblische Notizen (183). Herder: 101–128. doi:10.5281/zenodo.4260245. ISSN 0178-2967.
- ——— (2019). "Jesus, the New Testament, and the sacred Tetragrammaton". Synthesis. 8: 27–87. doi:10.26262/syn.v8i1.7718.
- ———; Gordon, Nehemia (2019). "Transmission of the Tetragrammaton in Judeo-Greek and Christian Sources". Accademia Cahier. 12: 85–126.
- ——; Borshchevsky, Ivan (2019). "Aspects of rendering the sacred Tetragrammaton in Medieval Slavic religious and secular texts". Филология и Лингвистика (Philology and Linguistics). 3 (19): 1–15.
- ——— (2022). "Esodo 3:14, 15: Riesame della risposta di Dio a Mosè sull'Horeb" [Exodus 3:14, 15: Revisiting God's reply to Moses at Horeb]. In Arduini, Francesco (ed.). Il Dio della Bibbia (in Italian). Santena (Turin), Italy: Land University Press. pp. 45–99. ISBN 9791280806154.
- ——— (2024). "An Overview of the New Testament Translations into Vernacular Greek during the Printing Era". In Shuali, Eran; Biver-Pettinger, Fränz (eds.). Traduire la Bible : Hier & aujourd'hui. Strasbourg, France: Association Presses Universitaires de Strasbourg. pp. 81–115. ISBN 978-2-38571-008-8.
- ———; Gordon, Nehemia; Andrist, Patrick; Hahn, Oliver; Calvillo, Nelson; Rabin, Ira (2024). "Did the Original Scribes Write the Distigmai in Codex Vaticanus B of the Bible (Vat. gr. 1209)?". The Vatican Library Review. 3 (2): 125–156. doi:10.1163/27728641-00302005.
- ———; Borshchevsky, Ivan (2025). "Идентификация Неопознанной Библейской Цитаты В «пространном Житии Константина-кирилла»" [Identification of an Overlooked Bible Quote in the Vita of Constantine-Cyril]. Архонт / Arhont. 7 (58): 217–223. doi:10.1163/27728641-00302005. ISSN 2587-9464.

== Sources ==
- Petros Vassiliadis; et al., eds. (2013). "Βασιλειάδης, Παύλος Δ.". Μεγάλη Ορθόδοξη Χριστιανική Εγκυκλοπαίδεια (MOXE). Vol. 4. p. 30. ISBN 9789608094598.
- Vasileiadis (MTh), Pavlos (2013). "Κόμμα Ιωάννου (Α' Ιωάννη 5:7, 8): Μελέτη στην παρεμβολή και στην απομάκρυνσή του από το Βιβλικό κείμενο". "Comma Johanneum (1 John 5:7, 8): A study on its interpolation and removal from the Biblical text.".
- Vasileiadis (PhD), Pavlos (2017). "The sacred Tetragrammaton and its reception in the Medieval literature: A study on the translation of the Hebrew theonymy with special emphasis on two Bible translations". Aristotle University of Thessaloniki, PhD thesis.
- Vasileiadis (Post-Doc), Pavlos (2020). "The rendering of the Tetragrammaton in Greek in the holy Scriptures and other literature: A study on the diachronic reception and development of the Hebrew theonymy". Aristotle University of Thessaloniki, Postdoctoral research.
- Vasileiadis (MSc), Pavlos (2022). "Intelligent Digital Assistants: A survey and overview of the current state of the art". International Hellenic University; Thessaloniki, Greece, Postdoctoral research.
- IHBMR (2022). "Institute of Hebrew Bible Manuscript Research, Researchers". Researchers at the Institute of Hebrew Bible Manuscript Research.
