= Barnet Nover =

American journalist (1899–1973)

- Born: Barnet Novogrudsky; February 11, 1899; New York City
- Died: April 15, 1973 (aged 74); Boston
- Citizenship: United States
- Education: Cornell University
- Occupation: journalist
- Spouse: Naomi Nover

Barnet Nover (born Barnet Novogrudsky; February 11, 1899 – April 15, 1973) was an American journalist from New York. Over the course of his 50-year career, Nover covered public affairs and foreign policy for the Buffalo Evening News, Washington Post, and Denver Post. An honorable mention for the 1930 Pulitzer Prize, Nover briefly served as acting chair of the Standing Committee of Correspondents of the Capitol Press Gallery. After death, the Washington Press Club's Barnet Nover Memorial Award was established in his memory.

== Early life and education ==
Barnet Novogrudsky was born in New York City and attended DeWitt Clinton High School. At Cornell University, from which he graduated in 1919, he began using the last name Nover and was a member of Phi Beta Kappa. The following year, he received a Master of Arts degree from the same university.

== Career ==
Nover began his career as a reporter for the Buffalo Evening News in 1920, a position he would hold for the next 16 years while simultaneously lecturing on international relations at the University of Buffalo. As a reporter for the Buffalo Evening News, Nover traveled extensively in Europe and Asia and received honorable mention for the 1930 Pulitzer Prize.

In 1936 Nover was hired as a reporter for The Washington Post, where he covered foreign policy. His 1939 article "British Surrender – a Munich for the Holy Land", which compared the White Paper of 1939 to the Munich Agreement, was inserted into the Congressional Record by then United States Senator Harry Truman. For a three-year period, beginning in 1944, he hosted the nationally syndicated radio program Washington Views and Interviews simultaneous to his work with The Washington Post. In 1947, Nover left The Washington Post to accept an assignment as Washington bureau chief of The Denver Post, a position he held until his 1971 retirement. Following retirement, Barnet Nover kept his foreign policy column going through syndication.

During the 89th Congress, Nover served as acting chair of the Standing Committee of Correspondents of the Capitol Press Gallery.

== Personal life ==
Nover was married to Naomi Goll in 1934. He had at least one sister, Mary, who married Isaac Edward Kiev and worked as a librarian at Congregation Emanu-El of New York from 1949 to 1964.

Nover was a member of the Council of Foreign Relations, the White House Correspondents Association, and the National Press Club. He died at Massachusetts General Hospital April 15, 1973, aged 74.

== Legacy ==
In 1976, Naomi Nover financially endowed the Washington Press Club's Barnet Nover Memorial Award, named after her late husband.

According to Marlin Fitzwater, in 1988 Naomi Nover also donated a refrigerator in Barnet Nover's memory to the White House Briefing Room, which was subsequently used to store turkey sandwiches and soft drinks. Over a period of years the door of the Nover memorial refrigerator stopped functioning and rust developed on it, until it was finally removed sometime prior to 1995.
