= Vasiliades =

Vasiliades is a surname. Notable people with the surname include:

- Constantine Vasiliades (born 1985), Cypriot weightlifter
- William Vasiliades (born 1987), Cypriot weightlifter

== See also ==
- Vasiliadis
