= Vasiliadis =

Vasileiadis or Vas[s]iliadis (Greek: Βασιλειάδης) is a Greek surname. It is a patronymic surname which literally means "the child of Vasileios". The feminine form is Vasileiadou or Vas[s]iliadou (Βασιλειάδου). Notable people with the surname include:

- Aggelos Vassiliadis, Greek footballer
- Georgia Vasileiadou (1897–1980), Greek actress
- Kostas Vasileiadis (born 1984), Greek basketball player
- Pavlos D. Vasileiadis (born 1974), Greek biblical scholar
- Petros B. Vassiliadis (born 1945), Greek biblical scholar and Professor Emeritus of the Department of Theology of the Aristotle University of Thessaloniki (AUTh)
- Sebastian Vasiliadis, Greek-German footballer
- Spyridon Vassiliadis (1845–1877), Greek poet and playwright
- Yiannis Vasiliadis (1924–2012), Greek politician and naval admiral
