= Naomi Nover =

American journalist

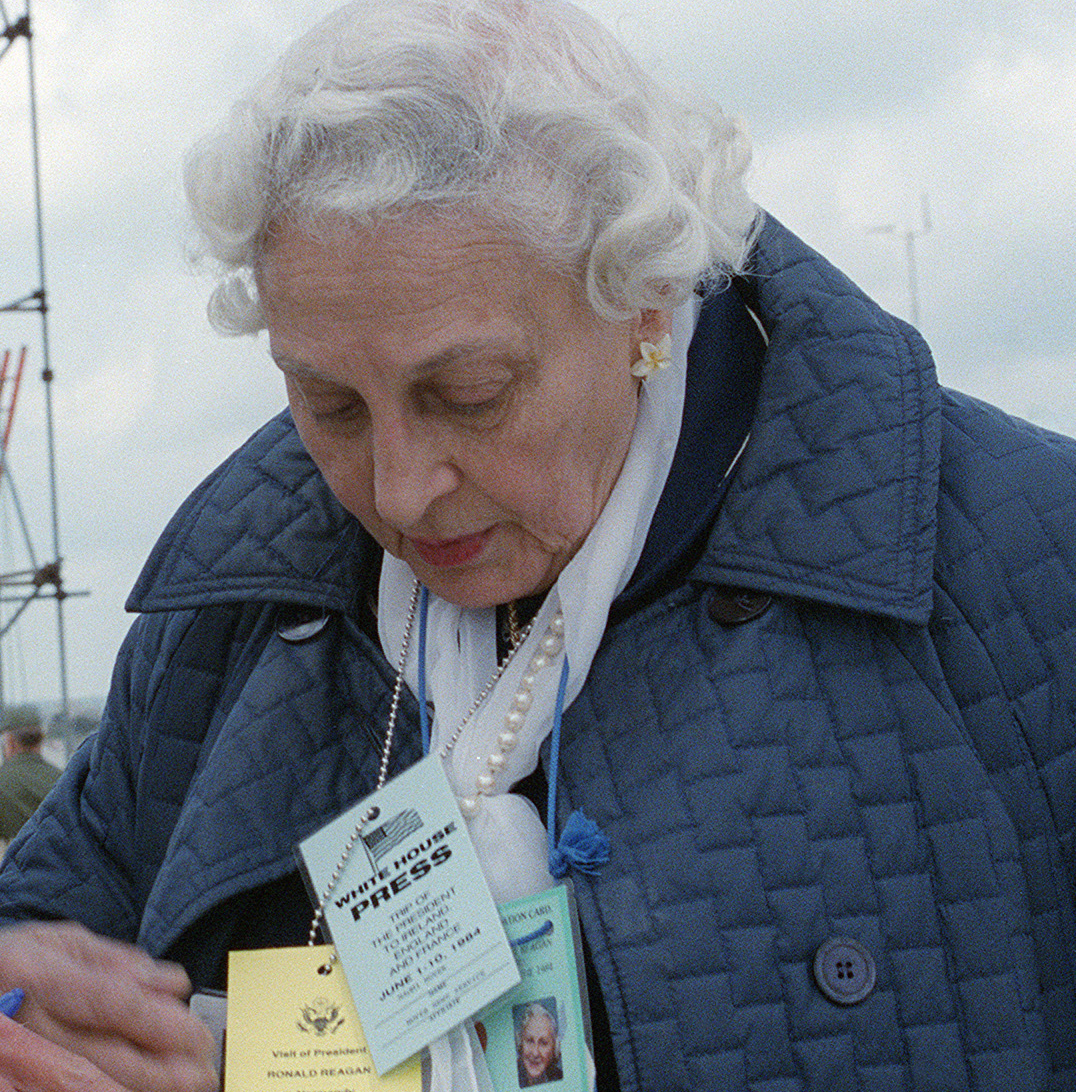
- Naomi Nover pictured in 1984
- Born: Naomi Goll; December 25, 1910; Buffalo, New York, United States
- Died: April 22, 1995 (aged 84); Howard University Hospital
- Citizenship: United States
- Education: University at Buffalo
- Occupations: journalist, teacher
- Height: 4 ft 11 in (150 cm)
- Spouse: Barnet Nover

Naomi Nover (née Goll; December 25, 1910 – April 22, 1995) was an American journalist who was a longtime member of the White House Press Corps remembered for her combative, and sometimes abusive, relationship with other journalists.

== Early life and education ==
Naomi Goll was born in Buffalo, New York and attended the University at Buffalo. She taught school in Buffalo, and worked at the Buffalo Times.

In 1934 she married Buffalo News columnist Barnet Nover and, in 1936, moved with him to Washington, D.C., where he had been hired as a reporter for The Washington Post. In Washington, she earned a master's degree in education from George Washington University and taught at Washington's Murch Elementary School.

In 1947, Barnet Nover was hired as Washington bureau chief of the Denver Post, a position he held until his 1971 retirement. Following retirement, Barnet Nover kept his foreign policy column going through syndication.

== Later life ==
After Barnet Nover's 1973 death, Naomi Nover attempted to take over his column; however, soon no newspapers were carrying it. Despite this, Nover continued to renew the White House press pass and congressional press gallery pass that had originally been issued to her late husband, attending White House press briefings and other media events in the Washington area. According to Foreign Policy, Nover "paid her own way on nearly every presidential trip abroad until her death in 1995 despite never actually doing any reporting".

In 1976, Nover financially endowed the Washington Press Club's Barnet Nover Memorial Award, named after her late husband. According to Marlin Fitzwater, in 1988 Naomi Nover also donated a refrigerator in Barnet Nover's memory to the White House Briefing Room, which was subsequently used to store turkey sandwiches and soft drinks. Over a period of years the door of the Nover memorial refrigerator stopped functioning and rust developed on it, until it was finally removed sometime prior to 1995.

In later life, she was said to have physically resembled George Washington. Marlin Fitzwater wrote that Nover died in a hallway in the Dirksen Senate Office Building while carrying her bag and an old camera.

=== Relationship with other journalists ===
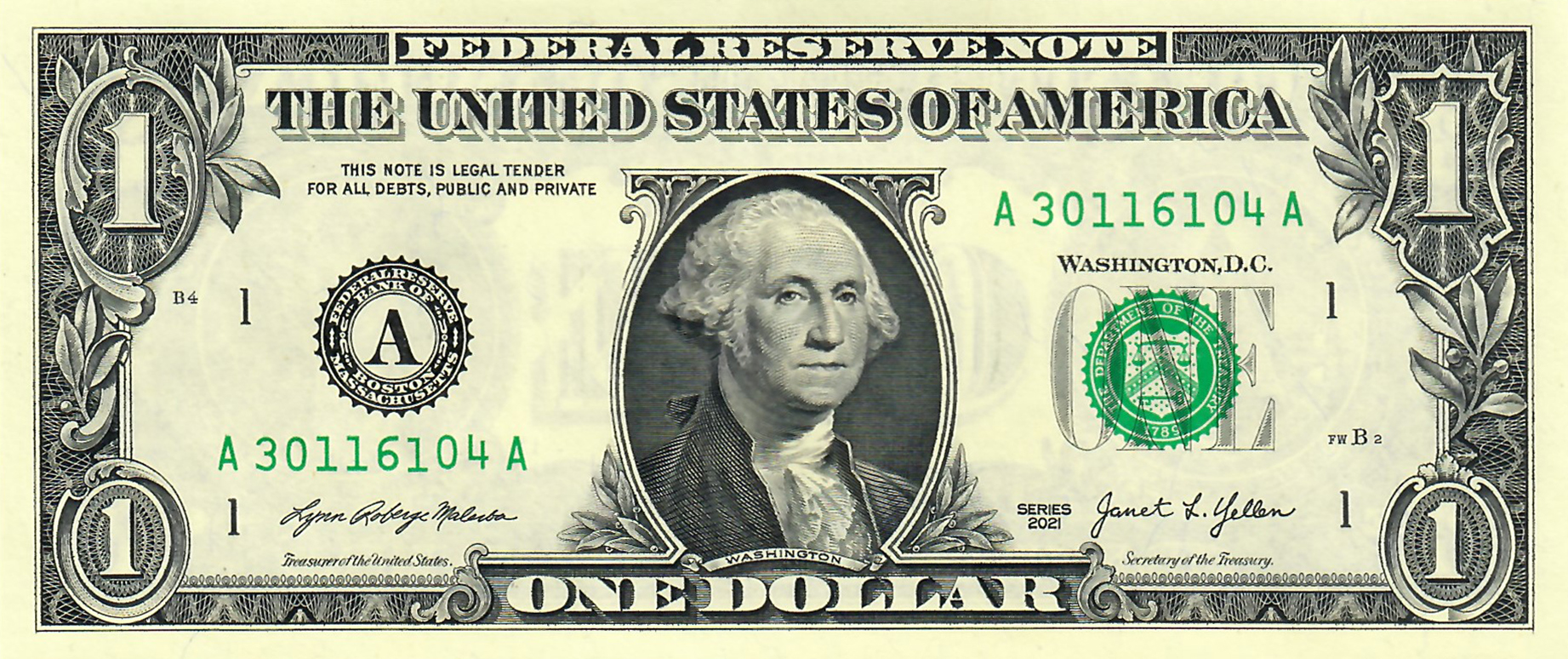
Once, to deescalate a confrontation between Nover and a Chinese guard, Detroit News correspondent Gary Schuster displayed a U.S. dollar bill and implied Nover was the person pictured on it.

Nover was known to be physically and verbally abusive towards journalists and others. While part of the press gaggle accompanying President of the United States Ronald Reagan to Xi'an, China, she pushed a Chinese guard with her umbrella who had blocked her path. The confrontation was deescalated when Detroit News correspondent Gary Schuster displayed a United States dollar to the guard and implied that the portrait of George Washington on it was, in fact, a portrait of Nover who was "a very important person". On another occasion, she publicly prayed for God to strike dead the Baltimore Sun's Nancy Schwerzler, whose hair annoyed her. When Los Angeles Times photojournalist Bernie Boston positioned himself in a way that interfered with Nover's attempt to photograph Ronald Reagan and Mother Teresa, Nover began beating him with her umbrella "as President Reagan and Mother Teresa looked on in total amazement". On yet another occasion, during the presidency of Jimmy Carter, Nover – responding to a perceived slight – assaulted the Baltimore Sun's Carl Leubsdorf with her purse and then, when he retreated, gave chase.

According to The Independent 's Andrew Stephen, he once arrived with George H. W. Bush's Air Force One party at Andrews Air Force Base and, after booking a taxi with four other journalists, Nover "simply got in and refused to budge before bursting into tears and loudly howling that the taxi was hers. A kindly Secret Serviceman carried her gently to another taxi while she screamed that he was killing her". Stephen would characterize Nover as "anything but a sweet old lady ... cursing at people, screeching and crying without any provocation, and continually beating innocent cameramen". Dan Froomkin, meanwhile, has described her as the "grand dame of White House eccentrics" while The Washington Post's Lloyd Grove would recall that Nover had a "habit of not taking notes at news conferences but instead demanding that colleagues tell her what was happening at the very moment something important was being said". In her autobiography, NBC News' Andrea Mitchell recalled that, on foreign presidential trips, "while we covered the president, she shopped", a fact that created logistical issues for other members of the press corps. Mitchell would say that "her shopping bags would block us from making a quick exit from a bus or plane".

Nover's ire was not always reserved for her fellow reporters. During an incident in the United States Capitol, Nover – upon finding all toilet stalls in a public restroom occupied – physically expelled a woman from one so she herself could use it. During one trip abroad, a witness recalled her "plowing eight helpless Mexicans into a ditch" with her cane.

Multiple attempts by some members of the White House Press Corps to have Nover's media credentials revoked produced no result.

== Legacy ==
Following her death, President Bill Clinton released a statement that read "Hillary and I were so saddened to learn of the death of Naomi Nover. Naomi's years of dedication to her craft, and her efforts to cover events here at the White House up until just a few months before her death, were a lesson to us all in hard work and the persistence of the human spirit".
