= Ukrainian Association for Jewish Studies =

Ukrainian academic organization

- Українська асоціація юдаїки
- Formation: 2015
- Legal status: Non-profit academic NGO
- Location: Kyiv, Ukraine
- President: Vitaly Chernoivanenko
- Vice President: Oleksiy Khamray
- Secretary: Serhiy Hirik
- Website: www.uajs.org.ua

The Ukrainian Association for Jewish Studies (UAJS) is a non-profit academic and professional non-governmental organization that brings together Ukrainian scholars and students who work in the field of Jewish studies. The UAJS was established in 2015.

The mission of the UAJS is to coordinate efforts of the scholars resident in Ukraine and abroad, aimed at the development of research on history, languages, art and other aspects of Jewish life in Ukraine and worldwide. There are two membership categories, Full membership and Student membership. The UAJS’ Articles of Association allows membership for foreign academicians.

Current UAJS President is Vitaly Chernoivanenko, PhD, Associate Professor in the History Department at the National University of Kyiv-Mohyla Academy (NaUKMA), the Vice President is Oleksiy Khamray, Dr. hab. in Philology, Director of the Near and Middle East Department at the Ahatanhel Krymskyi Institute of Oriental Studies of the National Academy of Sciences of Ukraine. Secretary of the UAJS is Serhiy Hirik, PhD in history, Senior Research Fellow at the State Research Institution "Encyclopedia Press".

== Activity ==
Practical activity of the UAJS includes the organization of the academic conferences, roundtables, workshops, public talks, and mini courses on Jewish Studies.

The UAJS publishes an annual academic journal Judaica Ukrainica, established in 2012. The UAJS also is a publisher of “Library of Judaica Ukrainica journal”.

The Ukrainian Association for Jewish Studies co-administers the MA in Jewish Studies Program at the National University of Kyiv Mohyla Academy (founded in 2012).

The organization cooperates with a number of academic and educational institutions and non-governmental organizations from Ukraine and abroad: National University of Kyiv-Mohyla Academy, Ukrainian Catholic University, Jewish Studies Department of the Jagiellonian University, Hebrew University of Jerusalem, Université de Montréal, Jewish Theological Seminary of America, United States Holocaust Memorial Museum, Ukrainian Jewish Encounter Initiative, Nadav Foundation, Vaad of Ukraine, European Association for Jewish Studies, World Union of Jewish Studies etc. In cooperation with its partner institutions, the UAJS acts as a co-organizer of academic events in educational and research institutions of Ukraine.

In 2015–2016 academic year, in partnership with the Institute for the Study of Global Antisemitism and Policy (Canada–USA), the UAJS organized at the NaUKMA the series of public lectures and discussions "Contemporary Antisemitism in Ukraine and Worldwide" by well known researchers, public figures and journalists from Ukraine and abroad: Yaroslav Hrytsak, Yosyf Zisels, Vakhtang Kipiani, Taras Voznyak, Vitaly Portnikov etc.

In October 2017, the Ukrainian Association for Jewish Studies and the NaUKMA's Master Program in Jewish Studies with the support of the European Association for Jewish Studies organized the International conference “Ukrainian Jews: Revolution and Post-Revolutionary Modernization. Policy, Culture, and Society”, dedicated to the destiny of Ukrainian Jews during 1917–1920s. The event brought together the scholars from Ukraine, Austria, Germany, Hungary, Israel, the UK, the USA.

In October 2018, the UAJS has organized the international conference "Modern Israel: From State in Construction to State Facing Challenges" on occasion of the 70th anniversary of the State of Israel. The researchers from Canada, the US, Germany, Israel, Poland, Sweden, the UK, and Ukraine participated in this event. The topics of the history of Israel and Zionism, relations between Israel and another countries, Israeli society and culture etc. were discussed during the conference. The event was supported by the Nadav Foundation, the European Association of Israel Studies and the Masoret Kiev community.

In 2019, with the support of the Dutch Jewish Humanitarian Fund, the Ukrainian Association for Jewish Studies organized a popular science lecture series "Jews of Ukraine: From Ancient Rus to Independence." The project events were held at the Halom Jewish Center (Kyiv). 18 lectures on various topics related to the history and traditions of Eastern European Jewish communities, Jewish culture, literature, and modern translations from the Yiddish language were delivered by leading researchers, teachers of the Master's and Certificate programs in Jewish Studies at the National University of Kyiv-Mohyla Academy, and specialists from other academic institutions of Ukraine.

In 2020–2021, as part of the UAJS' Yiddish project, with the support of the Omelian Pritsak Center for Oriental Studies at the Ukrainian Catholic University of Kyiv-Mohyla Academy and the Jewish Theological Seminary (New York), the association will organize academic language courses and a Yiddish conversation club.
