= Judaica Ukrainica =

Judaica Ukrainica is an international interdisciplinary peer-reviewed annual journal in Jewish history and culture. The languages of the journal are Ukrainian, English, and Russian. The journal was established in 2012 as a publication of the National University of Kyiv-Mohyla Academy. Since 2015 it is also a journal of the Ukrainian Association for Jewish Studies.

Founder and Editor-in-chief of the journal is Vitaly Chernoivanenko, Associate Professor of the History Department at the National University of Kyiv-Mohyla Academy, Co-Director of the NaUKMA’s Master Program in Jewish Studies, President of the Ukrainian Association for Jewish Studies. The Editorial Board of the journal includes Norman Golb (USA), Ola Hnatiuk (Poland, Ukraine), Yaroslav Hrytsak (Ukraine), Serhiy Kvit (Ukraine), Iwan Monolatij (Ukraine, Poland), Moshe Rosman (Israel), Myroslav Shkandrij (Canada), Shaul Stampfer (Israel), Natalia Yakovenko (Ukraine).

After the submission the manuscripts go through the blind peer-review process. Judaica Ukrainica accepts original papers, previously unpublished in other journals.

The annual journal includes general sections that cover different variety of subfields of Jewish Studies: Biblical Studies, Jewish Thought, Ukrainian-Jewish Discourses, Jewish Art, Source Publications. Every volume contains the Book Reviews section. Occasionally the special issues are published. The 2017 volume was dedicated to the Centennial of the 1917 Revolution and included primarily articles on the fate of the Ukrainian Jews in revolutionary epoch.

The journal publishes the scholarly contributions by the researches from Ukraine, Israel, the Netherlands, Russia, the USA etc.
