= Jewish studies =

Academic discipline centered on the study of Jews and Judaism

Jewish studies (Hebrew: מדעי היהדות, romanized: madʿê ha-yahadut, lit. 'sciences of Judaism'), or Judaic studies, is an academic discipline centered on the study of Jews and Judaism. Jewish studies is interdisciplinary and combines aspects of history (especially Jewish history), Middle Eastern studies, Asian studies, Oriental studies, religious studies, archeology, sociology, languages (Jewish languages), political science, area studies, women's studies, and ethnic studies. Jewish studies as a distinct field is mainly present at colleges and universities in North America.

Related fields include Holocaust research and Israel studies (where a difference must be made between Israel studies, which deal with the modern State of Israel, and Land of Israel studies, which deal with the general study of the Land of Israel), and in Israel, Jewish thought. Bar-Ilan University has the world's largest school of Jewish studies, while Harvard University was the first American university, and perhaps the first in the world, to appoint a full-time scholar of Judaica to its faculty.

== History ==
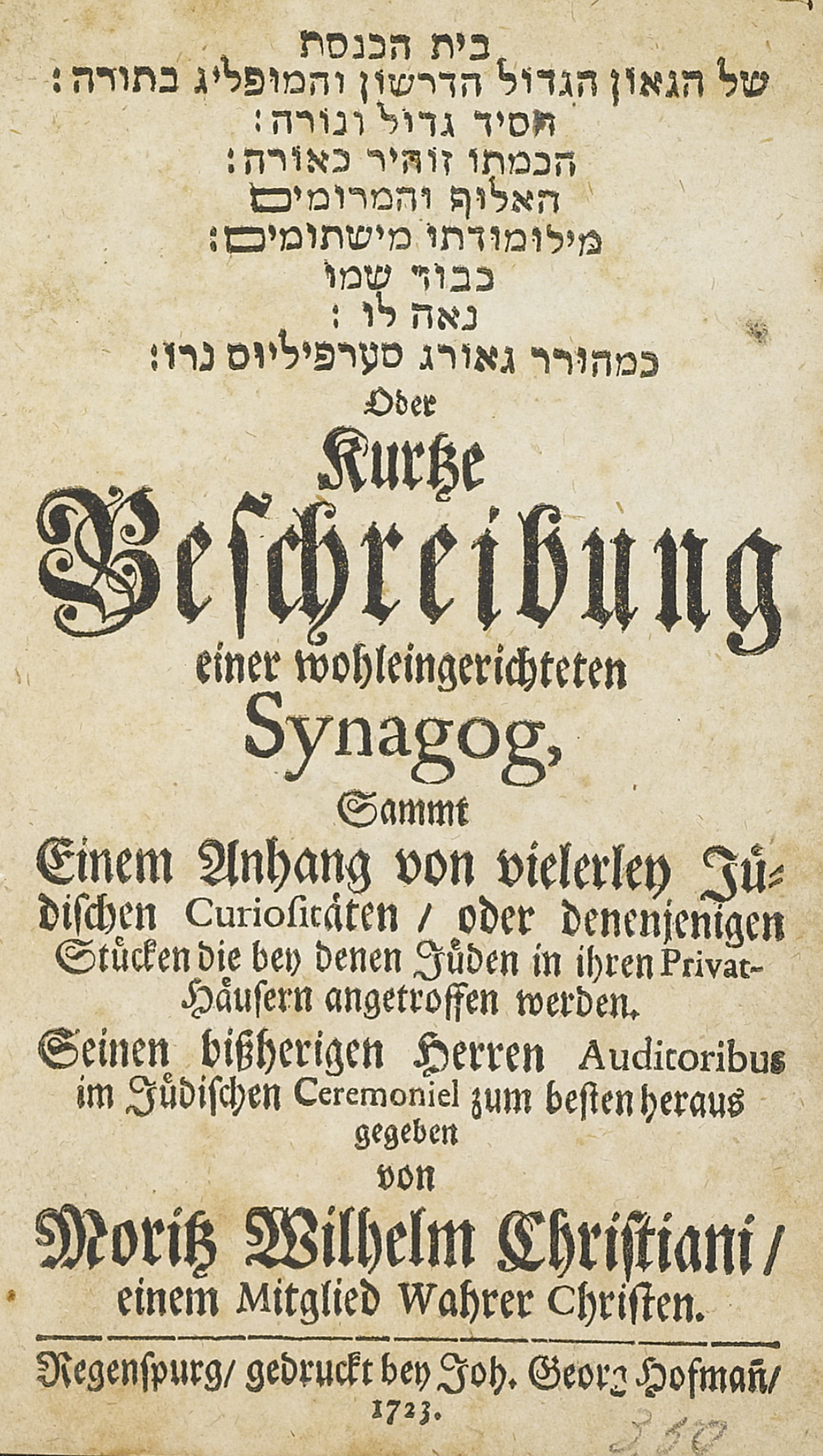
In the 18th century, as interest in the "curiosities" of the Jewish religion rose, some non-Jews had models of synagogues erected, furnished with a full array of Jewish books and ceremonial objects, and accessible to a broad public, constituting the world's first "Jewish museums." This title page is from a book by Moritz Wilhelm Christiani, which describes such a replica, owned by Georg Serpilius, a Christian Hebraist.

The Jewish tradition generally places a high value on learning and study, especially of religious texts. Torah study—the study of the Torah, and more broadly, the entire Hebrew Bible and Rabbinic literature, including the Talmud and Midrash—is considered a religious obligation. Since the Renaissance and the growth of higher education, many people, including those not of the Jewish faith, have chosen to study Jews and Judaism to better understand the Jewish religion, heritage, and history.

The term Wissenschaft des Judentums ('science of Judaism') first appeared among young Jewish intellectuals in Berlin during the 1810s and 1820s. The first organized attempt at developing and disseminating Wissenschaft des Judentums was the Verein für Kultur und Wissenschaft der Juden (Society for Jewish Culture and Science of the Jews), founded around 1819 by Eduard Gans—a pupil of Hegel)—and his associates, among them Leopold Zunz, Moses Moser, and later Heinrich Heine. Its principal objective, as it was then defined in the Zeitschrift für die Wissenschaft des Judentums (1822), was the study of Judaism by subjecting it to criticism and modern research methods. With the development of the "science of Judaism" throughout the 19th and 20th centuries and its ramifications into many spheres and subjects (e.g., biblical criticism, Talmud, Jewish literature of all periods, history and archaeology, and religious philosophy), "science of Judaism" came to signify the totality of studies concerning the Jewish people and Judaism. In English-speaking countries, these studies came to be referred to by such terms as Judaistica, Judaica, and Jewish studies or Judaic studies.

Religious instruction specifically for Jews—especially for those who wish to join the rabbinate—is taught at Jewish seminaries; in Orthodox Judaism, foundational education is conducted in yeshivas. Among the most prominent rabbinical schools outside of Orthodox Judaism are the Conservative Jewish Theological Seminary of America and the Reform Hebrew Union College.

For the majority of Jewish students attending regular academic colleges and universities, there is a growing choice of Jewish studies courses and even degrees available at many institutions. The topics of antisemitism, the Holocaust, the State of Israel, and the revival of the Hebrew language have sparked increased academic study, research, and lecturing. In the US, American Jews' unique social position has led to considerable scholarship, especially on interfaith marriage, political activism, and cultural influence.

In a 1966 article published in the American Jewish Year Book, the Hebrew literature scholar Arnold Band was among the first to call attention to the "spread of Jewish studies as an accepted academic discipline in the American liberal arts colleges and universities since the Second World War". In his article, Band defined Jewish (Judaic) studies as "the discipline which deals with the historical experiences, in the intellectual, religious, and social spheres, of the Jewish people in all centuries and countries".

The political situation in the Middle East, especially the Arab–Israeli conflict and the Israeli–Palestinian conflict, has raised the profile of Jews, Judaism, and Zionism on campuses, spurring many to study the subject for non-degree as well as for credits in obtaining Bachelor of Arts or Master of Arts degrees. A growing number of students are earning PhDs in Jewish studies, as evidenced by the number of courses and programs available. Many hope to obtain employment in Jewish education or in Jewish communal service agencies.

Some Christians seek an understanding of the Jewish background of Jesus and Christianity, and of the source of monotheism that sprang from Judaism. There are those who are seeking an understanding of the complex and volatile relationship between Islam and Judaism. Others are searching for spirituality and philosophy and therefore seek classes in Kabbalah (Jewish mysticism) and Jewish philosophy. Some have a genuine concern and attachment to modern Israel as Christian Zionists and therefore seek to learn more about the subjects related to their beliefs.

== Schools that offer Jewish studies ==
Jewish studies have been offered at universities around the world.

=== Israel ===
==== Hebrew University of Jerusalem ====
The Institute of Jewish Studies of the Hebrew University of Jerusalem was established in 1924, a few months before the official opening of the university. Widely considered to be the world's premier center of Jewish studies, the institute includes eight teaching departments and 18 research institutes, oversees the publication of a wide variety of journals and periodicals and has a student body of over 1200 students pursuing undergraduate, graduate and doctoral degrees in Jewish studies. In addition, the university has several institutes dedicated to specific subjects of Jewish studies, such as the Institute of Contemporary Jewry, the Institute for Research in Jewish Law, the Institute of Archaeology, the Center for Jewish Art, the Jewish Music Research Center, the Center for Jewish Education, and the Department of Jewish Thought. The Jewish National and University Library, which serves as the library of The Hebrew University of Jerusalem, houses the world's largest collection of Hebraica and Judaica. The university also benefits from Jerusalem's unparalleled concentration of resources, which include: some 50 museums, most of which are dedicated to, or contain significant exhibits pertinent to, Jewish studies; dozens of independent research institutes and libraries dedicated to Jewish studies; over 100 rabbinical colleges representing all streams of Judaism; and the city of Jerusalem itself, the ancient and modern center of Jewish life, thought and study.

==== Bar-Ilan University ====
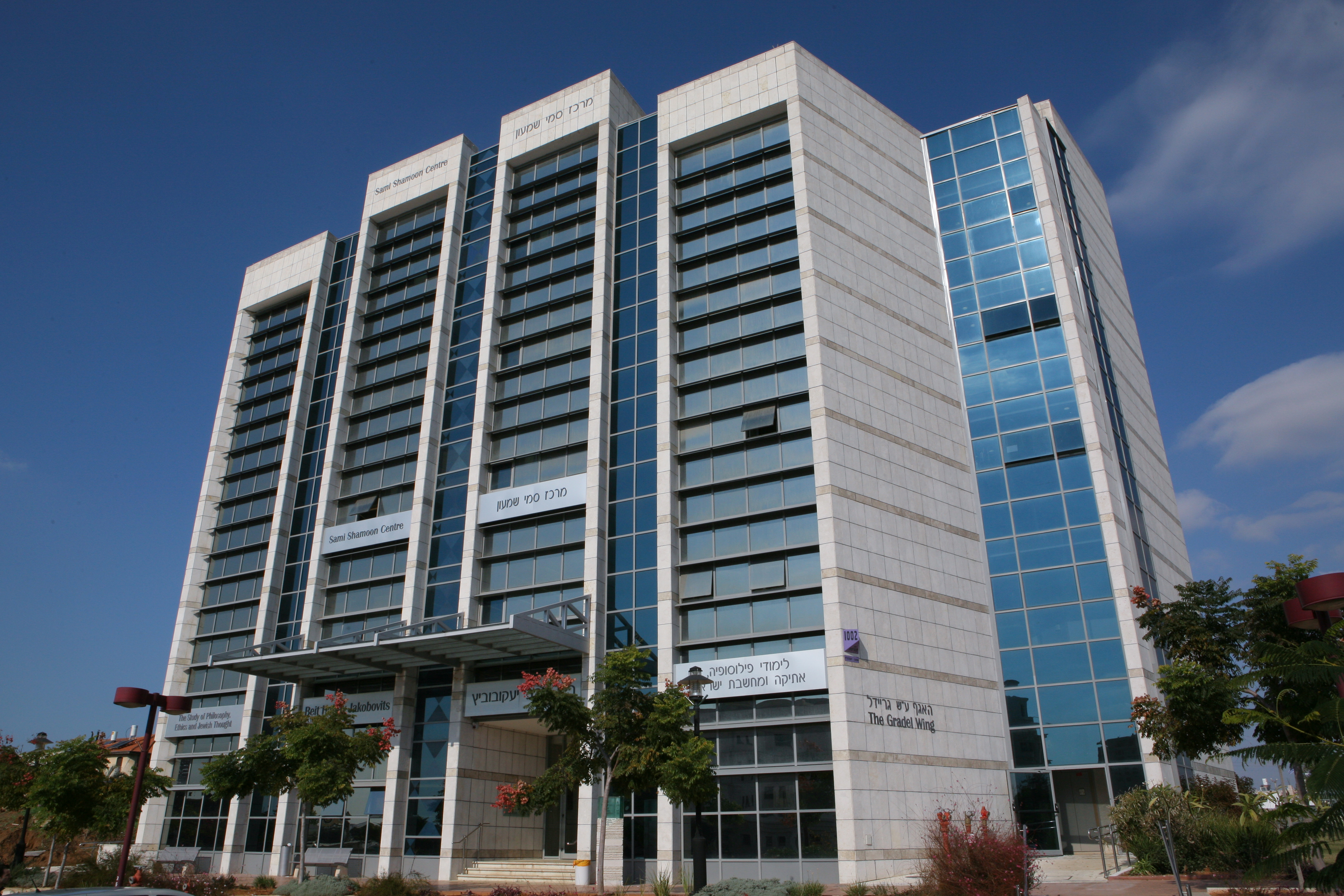
Bar Ilan University – Centre for the study of philosophy, ethics and Jewish thought

Bar-Ilan University in Ramat-Gan, Israel, has the world's largest school of Jewish studies, which includes 14 teaching departments, 21 research institutes, some 300 faculty members and over 2,000 students. The school publishes 11 journals and the only internet journal in Jewish Studies — Jewish Studies. Flagship projects of the Faculty of Jewish Studies include: the Responsa Project which is the largest database of classical Jewish sources throughout the ages; The "Mikraot Gdolot Haketer" which is the most accurate edition of the Mikraot Gdolot; The Ingeborg Rennert Center of Jerusalem Studies; and the Tell es-Safi/Gath Archaeological Project, the excavations of the site of biblical Gath of the Philistines under the auspices of Prof. Aren Maier.

==== Tel Aviv University ====
Tel Aviv University's Department of Hebrew Culture Studies is the single largest integrative Jewish studies department in the world today. It covers a wide range of periods, methodologies, and scholarly interests. The Jewish Studies International MA provides tools and skills for further graduate studies in Jewish studies and other fields involving text work. It attracts Humanities graduates from all over the world. Its graduates are equipped for work in many branches of education, in Jewish and other communities, Jewish cultural institutions, synagogues and churches and charities.

=== North America ===
==== American Jewish University ====
The American Jewish University, formerly the separate institutions University of Judaism and Brandeis-Bardin Institute, is a Jewish, non-denominational and highly eclectic institution. Its largest component is its Whizin Center for Continuing Education in which 12,000 students are enrolled annually in non-credit granting courses. A prominent program of the Center is the university's annual speaker series. AJU's academic division includes the College of Arts and Sciences, leading to a B.A. degree in majors such as Bioethics (pre-med), Business, Communication Arts & Advocacy, Jewish Studies, Political Science, and Psychology. In addition, AJU offers graduate degrees through the Fingerhut School of Education, The David L. Lieber Graduate School, and the Ziegler School of Rabbinic Studies, a Conservative Jewish rabbinical seminary. AJU is host to two "think tanks," the Center for Israel Studies (CIS) and the Sigi Ziering Institute: Exploring the Ethical and Religious Implications of the Holocaust. Through the Brandeis-Bardin Institute, the University has oversight over Camps Ramah, Alonim, and Gan Alonim.

==== American University ====
The American University, located in Washington, D.C., is a private university that offers degrees in Jewish studies (both BA and minors). American University's Jewish Studies Program emphasizes the rich tradition of Jewish heritage in Western Civilization. The interdisciplinary Jewish Studies Program encompasses more than a dozen award-winning faculty from a variety of departments across the University. AU's Jewish studies professors and scholars include prize-winning authors; internationally renowned experts in the humanities, social sciences, and the arts; and several recipients of the Scholar/Teacher of the Year Award, AU's highest faculty honor. In addition to spending time in the classroom, these faculty make frequent media appearances and work with a wide range of scholarly and cultural institutions in our nation's capital and beyond dedicated to advancing knowledge of Jewish civilization to a wider public. Internships and other opportunities enable AU students to join with the faculty as they reach out to the wider community. A degree in Jewish studies enables students to analyze the civilizations of the Jewish people and their various cultural and religious expressions from the antiquity to the present. The Jewish Studies Program offers a major in Jewish studies, and minors in Jewish studies and in Israel studies.

==== Binghamton University ====
Binghamton University (SUNY) offers a major and a minor in Judaic studies (JUST). The department offers two concentrations: 1) Jewish history and culture and 2) Hebrew language and literature. There are a wide variety of courses offered. Internship credits are available. It also is home to a new Center For Israel Studies.

==== Brandeis University ====
The Lown School of Near Eastern and Judaic Studies is a comprehensive center for Judaic studies. It houses the department of Near Eastern and Judaic Studies, "one of the oldest and largest programs of its type outside of the State of Israel, with the largest faculty in Jewish Studies of any secular American university." The department's founding chairman was Simon Rawidowicz. The graduate program grants MA and PhD degrees in Bible and Ancient Near East, Jewish Studies, and Arab and Islamic Civilizations. The building also houses the Maurice and Marilyn Cohen Center for Modern Jewish Studies, the Steinhardt Social Research Institute, the Tauber Institute for the Study of European Jewry, the Jacob and Libby Goodman Institute for the Study of Zionism, the Bernard G. and Rhoda G. Sarnat Center for the Study of Anti-Jewishness, and the Benjamin S. Hornstein Program in Jewish Communal Service. The National Center for Jewish Film and the American Jewish Historical Society are associated with the Lown School.

==== Brown University ====
Brown University in Providence, Rhode Island offers an interdisciplinary Judaic studies program that includes an undergraduate concentration and graduate MA and PhD degrees. Faculty areas of focus include the Hebrew language, Jewish thought, modern Hebrew and Jewish literature, ancient Judaism, modern Jewish history, Biblical studies, rabbinics and early Judaism, and Latin American Jewish literature.

==== Columbia University ====
The Institute for Israel and Jewish Studies at Columbia University in New York City is supported by access to rare books and over 35,000 Hebrew and Yiddish titles in Columbia's Library. Columbia offers a joint undergraduate degree with the Jewish Theological Seminary. Columbia offers graduate programs in Jewish history, Yiddish studies, Talmud and Judaism.

==== Cornell University ====
The Program of Jewish Studies at Cornell University in Ithaca, New York is an interdisciplinary program. The scope of the Jewish studies curriculum covers Jewish civilization from its ancient Near Eastern origins through its contemporary history and culture in Israel and the diaspora communities around the world. Instruction is offered in Semitic languages; the Hebrew Bible; medieval and modern Hebrew literature; ancient, medieval, and modern Jewish history; and Holocaust studies.

==== Emory University ====
The Tam Institute for Jewish Studies (TIJS) at Emory University in Atlanta, Georgia, established in 1999 to bring together students and scholars in the interdisciplinary exploration of Jewish civilization and culture, is the largest Jewish studies program in the southern United States. The Institute's core endowment was provided by the Arthur M. Blank Family Foundation. The Blank family named the Institute in honor of its spiritual leader, Rabbi Donald A. Tam, the founding rabbi of Temple Beth Tikvah of Roswell, Georgia and a community leader known for his wisdom, compassion, and public service (click here for a full bio of Rabbi Donald A. Tam). TIJS boasts nineteen core faculty members in seven departments across the Emory College of Arts and Sciences, plus one each in the Law School and the Candler School of Theology. In addition, seventeen affiliated faculty members offer occasional courses. Strengths of the program include modern and American Jewish history, Jews in Eastern Europe and in Islamic Civilizations, the Jewish textual tradition, modern Judaism, Jewish ethnography, Holocaust studies, Hebrew and Yiddish literatures and cultures, and Israel studies.

TIJS offers an undergraduate major and minor, graduate fellowships and a graduate certificate program. The Institute also supports undergraduate and graduate students with a wide range of grants for travel and research, study abroad, and intensive language study. In addition to its robust academic program, TIJS engages with the broader community through public events, most notably the Tenenbaum Family Lecture Series in Jewish Studies and the Rabbi Jacob M. Rothschild Memorial Lecture, which bring distinguished visiting scholars to campus.

==== Fairfield University ====
The Carl and Dorothy Bennett Center for Judaic Studies at Fairfield University in Connecticut was founded in 1994 with an initial endowment of $1.5 million from Carl and Dorothy Bennett. The Bennett Center's goal is to provide Fairfield University students exposure to and contact with Jewish ideas, culture, and thinking through lectures and other events.

Fairfield University also offers a minor in Judaic studies within the Religion Department. Courses cover the Jewish faith, history, and culture. It seeks to integrate Judaic studies into the curriculum of the Fairfield College of Arts and Sciences.

==== Florida Atlantic University ====
The Jewish Studies program at Florida Atlantic University provides an interdisciplinary approach to the academic study of Jewish culture, society and religion. As part of the Dororthy F. Schmidt College of Arts and Letters, the curriculum emphasizes historical transformations and comparative frameworks among various Jewish communities and with other groups and religions. Students may pursue an undergraduate major or minor in areas such as Jewish Civilization, History, Israel, Holocaust Studies, Arts and Culture, Religion, Politics and Social Issues.

==== George Washington University ====
Through the Columbian College of Arts and Sciences, the Judaic Studies Program at The George Washington University in Washington, D.C. offers students the ability to study in the proximity to some of the most influential Jewish and Jewish-related institutions in the United States. Because of its location on the Foggy Bottom campus in downtown Washington, D.C., internships with organizations such as the American Jewish Committee, American Israel Public Affairs Committee (AIPAC), the Embassy of Israel in Washington, the Sixth & I Historic Synagogue, and the United States Holocaust Memorial Museum are not only easily accessible but also very common.

The Gelman Library also hosts the I. Edward Kiev Collection, one of the largest Jewish academic archives on the East Coast.

==== Harvard University ====
The Center for Jewish Studies at Harvard University is the focal point for the study and teaching of Judaica through publications, fellowships, lectures, and symposia on topics of interest to scholars and to the general public. The Center sponsors visiting scholars and post-doctoral research fellows and coordinates undergraduate and graduate studies on an interdisciplinary basis. The Center does not offer degrees but degrees focusing on Judaic studies are available in various departments. See Harry Austryn Wolfson for history.

==== Hebrew Union College-Jewish Institute of Religion ====
HUC-JIR's Pines School of Graduate Studies features a community of graduate students from diverse faiths and international backgrounds in a rabbinical seminary environment. Leading scholars guide individualized doctoral programs in Hebrew Bible & History of Biblical Interpretation, Jewish and Christian Studies in the Greco-Roman Period, Rabbinic Literature, and Jewish Thought. Also offered are a joint doctoral program in Modern Jewish History and Culture with the Department of History at the University of Cincinnati. The Pines School provides unrestricted access to resources at HUC's Cincinnati campus: the Klau Library network (the second-largest Jewish library in the world), the Jacob Rader Marcus Center of the American Jewish Archives, the Archaeology Center, and the Skirball Museum, as well as the Nelson Glueck School of Biblical Archaeology in Jerusalem. Options include a two-year M.A. in Jewish studies in Cincinnati as a foundation for doctoral studies, which provides a mastery of Hebrew languages of all periods, skills to teach seminal Hebrew texts within their historical contexts, and treatment of all areas of Jewish studies as they relate to core academic disciplines, including history, literature, law, philosophy, and religion. The M.A. in Jewish Studies program also offers the opportunity for lay or professional leaders or non-Jewish clergy to expand their Judaic knowledge. The Summer-In-Israel Program for Ph.D. and M.A. students offers an archaeological dig into ancient Israel, coursework, and experiencing Israel as a modern state. Rabbis ordained at HUC or another accredited Jewish seminary can enroll in the Doctor of Hebrew Letters Program, with opportunities for non-residency independent study and coursework. HUC's New York campus offers the Interfaith Doctor of Ministry Program in Pastoral Counseling, designed for ordained clergy of all faiths. HUC's other graduate programs include the Rabbinical School's Master's in Hebrew Letters/Literature and ordination, the Debbie Friedman School of Sacred Music's Master's in Sacred Music and ordination, the School of Education's Master of Educational Leadership and concurrent option of Master of Arts in Jewish Learning, and the Zelikow School of Jewish Nonprofit Management's Master's in Jewish Nonprofit Management (24 months) and a Master's in Organizational Leadership (14 months), with limited summer residencies that allow students to work or complete another graduate school. The Jerome H. Louchheim School for Judaic Studies, based at HUC-JIR's Jack H. Skirball Campus in Los Angeles, offers courses for undergraduate students at the neighboring University of Southern California. Courses are held on both the HUC and USC campuses, and they are open to all undergraduates at the University of Southern California. The Louchheim School offers a minor in Judaic studies, a minor in Jewish American studies, and a concentration in Jewish studies within a religious studies major.

==== Indiana University ====
The Borns Jewish Studies Program offers an undergraduate major (with a Jewish sacred music curriculum in conjunction with the Jacobs School of Music at Indiana University); a certificate (8 courses); a minor in Hebrew; an undergraduate and graduate minor in Yiddish studies (via the Department of Germanic Studies); a master's degree; and a PhD minor.

==== Jewish Theological Seminary of America ====
The Jewish Theological Seminary of America is a graduate school which describes itself as offering "the most extensive academic program in advanced Judaic studies in North America." The school grants MA, DHL, and PhD degrees in the areas of: ancient Judaism; Bible and ancient Semitic languages; interdepartmental studies; Jewish art and visual culture; Jewish history; Jewish literature; Jewish philosophy; Jewish studies and public administration; Jewish studies and Social Work; *Jewish women's studies; Jewish liturgy; medieval Jewish studies; Midrash; modern Jewish studies; and Talmud and rabbinics. In addition to its graduate school, JTS also runs the Albert A. List College of Jewish Studies (which is affiliated with Columbia University and offers joint/double bachelor's degree programs with both Columbia and Barnard College); the William Davidson Graduate School of Jewish Education; the H. L. Miller Cantorial School and College of Jewish Music; and the Rabbinical School. The school's library "contains 425,000 volumes, making it the largest and most extensive collection of Hebraic and Judaic material in the Western Hemisphere."

==== Miami University (of Ohio) ====
The Jewish Studies Program at Miami University offers students a minor, which requires 18 credit hours, and a thematic sequence . The minor requires a balance of pre-modern and modern courses. At Miami, thematic sequence typically consists of three related courses designed with an intellectual or pedagogical progression. Undergraduates must take a thematic sequence outside the department(s) in which they major, according to the Global Miami Plan for Liberal Education.

Miami's program began in 2000, with the support of Thomas Idinopulos (d. 2010) and Karl Mattox. The proposal for Miami's Jewish Studies Program was developed partly by Allan Winkler. In 2006 and 2007, Miami University received grants from the Posen Foundation for the study of secular Judaism. Professor Sven-Erik Rose

==== Michigan Jewish Institute ====
Michigan Jewish Institute provides academic baccalaureate and other degree granting programs that combine an arts and sciences foundation with concentrations in Education, Leadership and General Judaic Studies for career development in applied Judaic disciplines. The Institute is part of the Chabad-Lubavitch movement.

==== New York University ====
The Skirball Department of Hebrew and Judaic Studies offers one of the most comprehensive Jewish studies programs in North America, encompassing Hebrew language and literature as well as all facets of Jewish history and culture, from the ancient through the medieval to the modern. Courses are taught by faculty whose specialties include ancient Judaism, medieval Jewish history, modern Jewish history, Biblical studies, Middle Eastern studies, Postbiblical and Talmudic literature, Jewish mysticism, Jewish philosophy, and related fields. The school will grant eight elective credits to students who score 75 or more on the Jerusalem Exam Students may also receive credits for approved classes taken at NYU Tel Aviv.

==== Northwestern University ====
Northwestern University is home to the Crown Family Center for Jewish Studies, which offers both a minor and major in Jewish studies. The center consists of faculty across various departments, and offers courses in Hebrew, Yiddish, Jewish history, rabbinics, Jewish literature, and political science. Notable faculty include Yohanan Petrovsky-Shtern, Irwin Weil, Jacob Lassner, Beverly Mortensen and Elie Rekhess.

==== Portland State University ====
The Harold Schnitzer Family Program in Judaic Studies at Portland State University (PSU) is located in Portland, Oregon. The program offers both a Bachelor of Arts major and minor in Judaic studies. Majors may choose one of five areas of concentration: Jews in Antiquity; Israel Studies; Judaism; Literature, Culture, and the Arts; or Modern Jewish History. Hebrew language instruction is also available.

==== Princeton University ====
The Program in Judaic Studies at Princeton University offers a certificate program. It includes a mandatory course called Great Books of the Jewish Tradition. and four other classes.

==== Rutgers University ====
Rutgers University has the largest department of Jewish studies among public research universities in the U.S. The department serves as the academic home of seven full-time faculty members, who are supported by a dozen associated faculty members from other academic departments, Hebrew and Yiddish language instructors, and visiting fellows sponsored by the Allen and Joan Bildner Center for the Study of Jewish Life Students pursuing a B.A. degree may major or minor in Jewish studies. In addition, the department offers two specialized minors, one in Modern Hebrew Language and one in the Language and Culture of Ancient Israel.

The M.A. degree in Jewish studies is designed for those seeking to advance their knowledge at the graduate level to prepare for doctoral-level work in Jewish studies or other careers. The department also offers a Certificate in Jewish Studies to graduate students at Rutgers pursuing master's level or doctoral level work.

The program offers six free, non-credit, online courses in Jewish studies. Topics include Zionism, Rabbinic literature, Bible History, Jews under Islam and more.

==== San Diego State University ====
The Jewish Studies Program at San Diego State University (SDSU), located in San Diego, California, is an interdisciplinary program serving the students of SDSU as well as the greater San Diego community. SDSU offers a Major in Modern Jewish Studies and a Minor in Jewish Studies, teaching a broad range of topics related to Jewish history, religion and culture from the biblical through the modern periods. SDSU also offers a minor in Hebrew language within SDSU's Department of Linguistics, Asian/Middle Eastern Languages program In addition, SDSU hosts the Archives of the Jewish Historical Society of San Diego as well as The Lipinsky Institute for Judaic Studies. SDSU is ranked #28 in the country in public universities for Jewish students. SDSU has the largest Jewish student population in San Diego, and the fourth (4th) largest in California.

==== Spertus Institute for Jewish Learning and Leadership ====
Previously Chicago's College of Jewish Studies, the predecessor of Spertus Institute, was founded in 1924. In its first year it offered three courses: Jewish history, religion, and language. By 1948, a Department of Graduate Studies offering bachelors, masters, and doctoral degrees had been initiated. Today Spertus Institute offers accredited master's degree programs in Jewish Studies, Jewish Professional Studies, and Doctoral degree programs in Jewish Studies. Distance learning options serve students in 38 U.S. states and nine foreign countries.

==== State University of New York, Albany ====
The Judaic Studies (JST) department at UAlbany offers undergraduate courses at elementary and advanced levels in Jewish history and culture, as well as Hebrew. Both a major and a minor in Judaic studies are offered, as well as a minor in Hebrew

Courses range from basic introductory courses on particular topics in Judaic studies to more advanced seminars where students can explore questions and ideas in more depth. Many of the courses, both upper- and lower-level courses, are cross-listed with other departments, providing students with exposure to different disciplinary methods. There are also opportunities for students to earn independent study credit through which they can work on an idea or question particular to their own interests, while also gaining valuable research and writing experience. Practicum credit may also be earned by assisting a professor in a course, and Internship credit is available through community service

Qualified students also have the option of enrolling in the Honors Program to be considered for a BA in Judaic Studies with Honors upon successful completion of an honors thesis.

Hebrew language classes are also available at the elementary, intermediate, and advanced levels, and for students who are advanced in their language studies, Practicum and Independent study credit may also be earned.

The Center for Jewish Studies, which is affiliated with the Judaic studies department, sponsors several talks each semester, which are open to both the local, as well as academic communities, and include lectures and discussions by Jewish studies scholars and writers.

SUNY offers their students an opportunity to study abroad, including in Israel, which is overseen by the Judaic studies department and is open to everyone.

==== Syracuse University ====
The Judaic Studies Program at Syracuse University offers an Undergraduate Major in Modern Jewish Studies and a minor in Jewish studies. Additionally, the School of Education offers a minor in Jewish Education to "better prepare SU undergraduates to teach in Jewish congregational schools, camps, community centers, youth organizations." Syracuse University also offers classes in the Hebrew language.

==== Touro College ====
Touro College in New York City takes its name from Judah Touro and Isaac Touro, Jewish community leaders of colonial America, who represent the ideals upon which the College bases its mission. The college supports the faith of its Jewish students in addition to offering a variety of degrees.

==== University of Arizona ====
The Arizona Center for Judaic Studies at the University of Arizona operates within the School of Global Studies. It offers interdisciplinary courseworks for undergraduates and a minor in Judaic Studies, as well as a stand-alone Graduate Certificate in Judaic Studies.

==== University of California-Berkeley ====
The University of California-Berkeley offers the Joint Doctoral Program in Jewish Studies (JDP) in collaboration with the Graduate Theological Union. Graduate students in this interdisciplinary program pick one major and one minor period as well as a discipline. The JDP includes classes in Hebrew and Yiddish literature, rabbinics, cultural studies and critical theory. Professors and graduate students with scholarly interest in Jewish studies can be found across the humanities.

==== University of California-San Diego ====
The Judaic Studies Program at UC San Diego offers an undergraduate major in Judaic studies, a minor in Judaic studies, and a minor in Hebrew language and literature. Additionally, the History Department offers a master's degree in Judaic studies and a Ph.D. in ancient history with relevant major fields including the history of Israel in the biblical period and the history of the Jewish people in antiquity. The Anthropology Department, in conjunction with the Judaic Studies Program, offers graduate training in Near Eastern archaeology with a focus on Israel and Jordan. The school is also involved with the USC Shoah Foundation/The Visual History Archive an academic "authority on the study of genocide and personal testimony." Many free interviews and videos may be accessed online or at a partner site.

==== University of Michigan ====
The Jean and Samuel Frankel Center for Judaic Studies at the University of Michigan was formed as an independent program under the leadership of Jehuda Reinharz in 1976 and expanded into its current model in 1988. A strong faculty with a variety of expertise has allowed the interdisciplinary program to grow significantly in recent years. Areas of special interest include numerous faculty with strengths in rabbinics, Yiddish literature and modern Jewish history. The current director, Dr. Deborah Dash Moore, is the author of GI Jews, chronicling the role of Jews in the United States military and co-editor of the two-volume Jewish Women in America: An Historical Encyclopedia. Other leading faculty members include Zvi Gitelman, Todd Endelman, Anita Norich, Madeline Kochen, Mikhail Krutikov, Elliot Ginsburg, Scott Spector and Julian Levinson. Recent arrivals include Ryan Szpiech (Spanish, Sephardic Culture, Medieval Iberia) and Rachel Neis (rabbinics, Late Antique Judaism).

==== University of Oklahoma ====
The University of Oklahoma offers a Bachelor of Arts degree in Judaic studies and minors in Judaic studies and Hebrew. It also offers fellowships to students pursuing graduate degrees in history. The University is home to the Schusterman Center for Judaic and Israel Studies which began in 1993 as the Schusterman Program in Judaic and Israel Studies with the establishment of a Chairmanship by the Schusterman Family Foundation as a memorial to Sam Schusterman and Harold Josey. The program expanded to include a major in 2009. Classes include Hebrew, Jewish Literature, Jewish Mysticism, Israel, the Shoah, and Jewish History. Students can find other Jewish learning opportunities at the OU Hillel.

==== University of Pennsylvania ====
The Herbert D. Katz Center for Advanced Judaic Studies at the University of Pennsylvania is the only institution in the world devoted exclusively to post-doctoral research on Jewish civilization in all its historical and cultural manifestations. The Center was created in the fall of 1993 by the merger of the Annenberg Research Institute and the University of Pennsylvania. The library contains vast holdings of Judaica. There are several online exhibits as well.

University of Pennsylvania students can major or minor in Jewish studies in different departments.

Other resources are available at the Weigle Judaica and Ancient Near Eastern Studies (JANES) Reading Room (in the Van Pelt Library). It contains about 6,000 non-circulating resources for study including "...the Chicago Assyrian Dictionary (CAD); Biblical and multi-lingual dictionaries; grammars; important facsimiles and transcriptions of Sumerian and Northwest Semitic primary sources; critical Biblical editions and commentaries; Tannaitic, Amoraic, Midrashic, Geonic, and Responsa literatures; sixty-nine scholarly journals, including thirty-nine currently received periodicals." The Freedman Jewish Sound Archive contains over 4,000 Yiddish and Hebrew sound recordings and sheet music.

==== University of Texas at Austin ====
The Schusterman Center for Jewish Studies of The University of Texas at Austin, founded in 2007, is the hub for Jewish studies at UT Austin. It offers an undergraduate JS major; a network of graduate students pursuing Jewish research interests is organized through the Center. The Schusterman Center sponsors or cosponsors visiting speakers, film series, performing arts events, and exhibits, among other activities, and hosts visiting Israeli faculty. While it strives to include all Jewish topics, its areas of emphasis are Israel, which is covered by the Institute for Israel Studies within the Schusterman Center, Central and Eastern European Jewish history and culture and the Holocaust, Jewish Life in the Americas (including Latin America, the United States, and Canada), under the aegis of the Edwin Gale Collaborative for the Study of Jewish Life in the Americas, and Jewish Futures. The Schusterman Center houses the Nathan Snyder Memorial Library and a collection of original artwork by Latin American Jewish visual artists. It has close ties to the Latin American Jewish Studies Association (LAJSA) and hosts the LAJSA website.

==== University of Toronto ====
The University of Toronto offers degrees in Jewish studies through the Anne Tanenbaum Centre for Jewish Studies within the Faculty of Arts & Science. It offers undergraduate specialist, major, and minor programs, as well as collaborative programs with other departments at the graduate (MA and PhD) level. Its areas of emphasis are Classical Judaism, Jewish Philosophy and Thought, Jewish History and Social Sciences, and Jewish Cultures, Languages, and Literatures. Courses in Yiddish, Hebrew, Jewish history, philosophy, Bible studies, political thought, art history, and literature are cross-listed with other departments, and the Centre hosts its own seminar courses on a variety of topics. Students at the graduate level regularly publish the University of Toronto Journal of Jewish Thought.

==== University of Virginia ====
Jewish studies at the University of Virginia allows students to focus on the history, languages, and literature of the Jewish people; the beliefs and practices of Judaism; and the enduring contributions of Jewish wisdom to human civilization. Courses in Biblical and Modern Hebrew, Yiddish, Bible, Rabbinic literature, Jewish ancient and modern history, Jewish literature and culture, Holocaust studies, Jewish theology, and Jewish communities and cultures worldwide. Study abroad in Israel or in other centers of Jewry beyond North America.

==== University of Washington ====
Jewish studies at UW began in the 1970s and today includes 30 faculty members. Pillars of the program include the Stroum Lecture Series, and the Hazel D. Cole Fellowship.

==== Yeshiva University ====
Yeshiva University in New York City has one of the largest departments of Jewish studies outside Israel and is the home of the Rabbi Isaac Elchanan Theological Seminary, the leading modern-orthodox rabbinical college in the United States. Its Jewish studies library contains over 300,000 volumes. It also houses the Bernard Revel Graduate School of Jewish Studies. Prominent Jewish studies faculty members include Richard C Steiner, Barry Eichler, Debra Kaplan, Haym Soloveitchik, Ephraim Kanarfogel, David Berger, Mordechai Z. Cohen, Shalom Carmy, Steven Fine, Adam Zachary Newton, and Jeffrey S. Gurock.

==== Youngstown State University ====
The Center for Judaic and Holocaust Studies at Youngstown State University offers students a minor, which requires 18 credit hours. The minor focuses on the Holocaust, and modern Judaism. The Center for Judaic Studies also organizes various community educational events, talks, and collaboration between Youngstown State University and the Youngstown Area Jewish Federation.

=== Europe ===
- Institute of Jewish Studies (Free University) at the Free University of Berlin
- St. Petersburg Institute of Jewish Studies

==== University College London ====
University College London (UCL) houses the largest department of Hebrew and Jewish studies in Europe. The department is the only one in the UK to offer a full degree course and research supervision in Jewish studies at the BA Honours, MA, MPhil and PhD levels in every subject of Hebrew and Jewish studies—philology, history, and literature—covering virtually the entire chronological and geographical span of the Hebrew and Jewish civilisation from antiquity through the Middle Ages to the modern period. As the first university in England to open its doors to Women, Roman Catholics and Dissenters, UCL was also the first to admit Jewish students. This traditional link of the College with the Anglo-Jewish community is very much alive today. Sir Isaac Lyon Goldsmid (1778–1859), one of the leading figures in the struggle for Jewish emancipation in England, was among the principal founders of University College and the chief promoter of its Hebrew department. At his instigation, Hyman Hurwitz was appointed as the first Professor of Hebrew in 1828. In 1967 the department was renamed the Department of Hebrew and Jewish Studies and extended to include, in addition to the established courses in Hebrew language and literature, a much wider range of courses with an emphasis on Jewish history. The department acts as host to both the Jewish Historical Society of England (JHSE) and the UCL Institute of Jewish Studies, which organises annual public lecture series and international conferences on all aspects of Jewish civilisation.

==== Oxford University ====
A nine-month course at Oxford University offers a chance to study Judaism at many different stages in its history – from its roots as the religion of the Israelites to the 20th century – as well as the opportunity to develop skills in a language important to the knowledge, understanding, practice and interpretation of the Jewish faith (or learn a language from scratch).

==== University of Cambridge ====
Cambridge has long been a centre for Hebrew and Semitic studies, the Regius Professorship of Hebrew having been founded by Henry VIII in 1540. The Hebrew degree at the Faculty of Asian and Middle Eastern Studies (FAMES) takes four years, with the third year spent abroad. Along with general courses on Middle Eastern history and culture, students in the FAMES Hebrew programme study Hebrew language, literature, and culture of all periods (ancient, medieval, and modern). The teaching staff include specialists in each of these periods, including Dr. Aaron Hornkohl, Prof. Geoffrey Khan, Prof. Nicholas de Lange, Dr Yaron Peleg, and Dr. Michael Chaim Rand. A student may officially combine Hebrew with Arabic or a Modern European Language.

==== Birobidzhan Jewish National University ====
The Birobidzhan Jewish National University, a Russian university, works in cooperation with the local Jewish community of Birobidzhan. The university is unique in the Russian Far East. The basis of the training course is study of the Hebrew language, history and classic Jewish texts.

In recent years, the Jewish Autonomous Oblast has grown interested in its Jewish roots. Students study Hebrew and Yiddish at a Jewish school and Birobidzhan Jewish National University. In 1989, the Jewish center founded its Sunday school, where children studyYiddish, learn Jewish folk dance, and learn about the history of Israel. The Israeli government helps fund the program.

==== Center for Jewish Studies Heidelberg ====
The Center for Jewish Studies Heidelberg (Hochschule für Jüdische Studien Heidelberg) is an accredited non-denominational institution of higher learning that delves into a range of research topics within the field of Jewish Studies. With its ten chairs working in cooperation with the University of Heidelberg, the Center for Jewish Studies Heidelberg is a point of continuuous scholarly discussion, incorporating multiple different facets of Jewish religion, history, cultures and societies. While the proximity to the historical heritage of Ashkenaz provides impetus for both academic and religious work, its interest extends beyond to all areas of geography and chronology as to consider Jewish cultures at large.

==== University of Wrocław ====
The Taube Department of Jewish Studies of the University of Wrocław offers bachelors, masters, and doctoral programs with learning modern Hebrew, Yiddish, biblical Hebrew, and Ladino.

=== Asia ===
- Diane and Guilford Glazer Institute of Jewish Studies, Nanjing China

== Organizations ==
- Australian Association for Jewish Studies
- Association for Jewish Studies
- British Association for Jewish Studies
- Hochschule für die Wissenschaft des Judentums
- Jewish Theological Seminary of America
- Marshall Sklare Award
- Rohr Jewish Learning Institute
- Spertus Institute
- Ukrainian Association for Jewish Studies
- Yeshiva

== See also ==
- Antisemitism studies
- Baltimore Hebrew University
- Gender and Judaism
- Genetic studies on Jews
- Gratz College
- Hebrew College
- Hebrew studies
- Reconstructionist Rabbinical College
- Sociology of Jewry
- Study of the Hebrew language
