= Miltiadis Konstantinou =

Greek academic

- Born: Μιλτιάδης Δ. Κωνσταντίνου; August 1952; Kozani
- Education: Doctor of Philosophy
- Alma mater: Aristotle University of Thessaloniki
- Position held: professor emeritus, dean

Miltiadis Konstantinou (Greek: Μιλτιάδης Δ. Κωνσταντίνου; born in August 1952, Kozani) is a Greek professor emeritus, translator and dean of the school of theology at the Aristotle University of Thessaloniki. He is the head and a founding member of the Ελληνικής Βιβλικής Εταιρείας (Hellenic Bible Society) in charge of the programme for the translation of the Old Testament in Modern Greek. He is also member of the scientific committee for the translation project of the United Biblical Companies worldwide.

== Life ==
Miltiadis Konstantinou was born in Kozani in 1952 and has been living in Thessaloniki since 1957.

=== Education ===
From 1983 Konstantinou holds a Ph.D. in Biblical Hermeneutics at the Aristotle University of Thessaloniki with the thesis Ο Κύριος εβασίλευσεν.

=== Teaching ===
From 1982 to 1988 he has taught as a lecturer Old Testament and Biblical Hebrew language at the department of theology of the Aristotle University of Thessaloniki. From 1989 to 1997 he become as an assistant professor at the Aristotle University of Thessaloniki, and then, a full professor. From 2002 to 2006 he become visiting professor at the theological school of the University of Balamand.

=== Academic work ===
From 1997 to 1999 he was vice-chairman, from 2001 to 2003 and from 2005 to 2007 he was chairman of the department of theology of the Aristotle University of Thessaloniki. From 2014 to 2018 he become dean of the school of theology of the Aristotle University of Thessaloniki.

== Award ==
Konstantinou was awarded by the Ecumenical Patriarchate with the honorary title of the "Teacher of the Gospel" while he is the delegate of the Greek church to the International Commission for the Anglican-Orthodox dialogue (ICAOTD).

== Sources ==
- Οι εκδόσεις Ροπή (2015-06-06). "Miltiadis Konstantinou". www.ropipublications.com.
- AUTh (2008). "Μιλτιάδης Κωνσταντίνου". Αριστοτέλειο Πανεπιστήμιο Θεσσαλονίκης.
- "Μιλτιάδης Κωνσταντίνου". Αριστοτέλειο Πανεπιστήμιο Θεσσαλονίκης. 2018. Archived from the original on 2018-10-24.
