= Petros Vassiliadis =

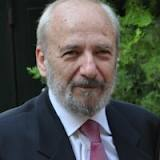
- Born: 6 August 1945; Thessaloniki, Greece
- Occupations: Biblical scholar, Professor Emeritus, author
- Notable work: LOGOI IESOU: Studies in Q, Lex orandi: Λειτουργική θεολογία και λειτουργική αναγέννηση
- Spouse: Marina
- Children: Anastasia, Katerina, Vasileia
- Theological work
- Era: 20th century
- Tradition or movement: Orthodox Christianity
- Main interests: Biblical Theology, Interfaith dialogue, Q source
- Website: https://auth.academia.edu/PetrosVassiliadis/

Petros B. Vassiliadis (Greek: Πέτρος Βασιλειάδης; born 1945) is a Greek biblical scholar and Professor Emeritus of the Department of Theology of the Aristotle University of Thessaloniki (AUTh), honorary president of the Center of Ecumenical, Missiological and Environmental Studies “Metropolitan Panteleimon Papageorgiou” (CEMES) and the World Conference of Associations and Theological Institutions and Educators (WOCATI).

== Biography ==
Vassiliadis was born in Thessaloniki on August 6, 1945.

=== Education ===
Vassiliadis pursued undergraduate studies in Theology and Mathematics in AUTh, and post-graduate studies in Biblical Criticism and Biblical Theology at British (King's College London) and German (Heidelberg) universities. Vassiliadis studied at the University of Athens, where he submitted his doctoral dissertation entitled On the Hypothesis of the Q-Document. A Critical Consideration of Current Literary and Theological Problems of the Q-Document (1977).

=== Teaching ===
Petros Vassiliadis started his academic career by serving as an assistant to the late professor Savvas Agouridis (1974-1977) at the Theological School of the University of Athens.

He then moved to his home town, Thessaloniki, where he was elected lecturer in 1982, assistant professor in 1983, associate professor in 1985, and full professor in 1989, at the Department of Theology of the Aristotle University of Thessaloniki. There he taught for almost 35 years New Testament and Interfaith dialogue, being also assigned for some time the courses of Missiology, Liturgics and Ecumenical Dialogue. He also taught as a visiting professor at various institutions, universities and colleges of USA (St. Vladimir's, St. Athanasius, Smith College, Lynchburg), of Europe (Bossey, Bologna Bari, Ravenna, Copenhagen, Lund, Oslo, Joensuu, Reykiavik), and Asia (South Korea).

Vassiliadis supervised more than 17 master and 10 doctoral dissertations (promoting, in addition to the traditional, the sociological, feminist and other contemporary exegetical methods of biblical analysis), but also of missiological, ecumenical and liturgical character.

=== Career ===
He was for many years the departmental coordinator of the Erasmus/Socrates program of inter-university cooperation of the European Union. From 1986 he is co-editor of the Greek biblical series “Hermeneia of the New Testament” (ΕΚΔ) and “Bibliotheca Biblica” (ΒΒ), editor of the ecumenical series “Ecclesia-Koinonia-Oecumene” (ΕΚΟ), and of the CEMES series, editor-in-chief for East and South Europe of the “International Studies in Formative Christianity and Judaism” of the University of South Florida, and editor of the Great Orthodox Christian Encyclopedia (Μεγάλη Ορθόδοξη Χριστιανική Εγκυκλοπαίδεια, MOXE) in its early stages.

He also served as an Orthodox commissioner of CWME of the WCC (1998-2006), and chief organizer of the 14th World Mission Conference, officially hosted on his recommendation by the Church of Greece in Athens (2005), for the first time in an Orthodox setting. He was coordinator of the Biblical Studies in the 12th World Mission Conference in San Antonio, Texas of USA (1989), and the 8th General Assembly in Harare, Zimbabwe (1998). In addition, he served in various Synodical Committees of the Church of Greece (of Liturgical Renewal, and of Inter-Orthodox and Inter-Christian Relations), consultant of the United Bible Societies for the improvement of the relations with the Orthodox Churches and the presentation of the Orthodox understanding of the Bible to the global family of the Bible Societies, institutional coordinator of the Forum Mediterraneum, dealing with issues pertinent to faith, history of religions, and cultural anthropological research on the three monotheistic religions of the Mediterranean sea, and member of the editorial committee of the Orthodox biblical journal Δελτίο Βιβλικών Μελετών (Bulletin of Biblical Studies) of the “Artos Zoes” foundation, and of the Regnum Edinburgh 2010 Mission Series of the Oxford Center of Mission Studies.

He is Honorary President of the WOCATI, a founding member, secretary, and vice-president of the Society for Ecumenical Studies and Inter-Orthodox Relations (SESIOR), founding member, first secretary, and now president of the CEMES, member of the Q International Project of the Society of Biblical Literature, as well as of the Studiorum Novi Testamenti Societas (SNTS), and among the coordinators of the regular conferences of Eastern and Western N.T. Scholars. He was one of the main contributors of the Inter-Christian Symposia of the Department of Theology of the Aristotle University of Thessaloniki and the Pontifical University Antonianum of Rome, and a close friend of the ecumenical monastic community of Bose in Italy.

Together with his colleagues, professors S. Agouridis, G. Galitis, J. Karavidopoulos, B. Stoyannos and J. Galanis, he translated the New Testament into Modern Greek (1977-1989). He published, edited in Greek and English nearly 20 books, and 300 articles in scientific journals, conference proceedings, and collective volumes, as well as in the conventional and electronic press. He also participated in radio and television discussions, and gave numerous interviews on a variety of themes. He participated in more than 100 international conferences.

After his becoming an Emeritus Professor, and his being honored by his colleagues of the Department of Theology for his contribution to the ecumenical dialogue, he was devoted to the establishment of the CEMES scientific foundation, directing as its president the projects on Ecumenical Dialogue, Inter-faith Dialogue, the Orthodox Mission, the Order of Deaconesses, the Holy and Great Council of the Orthodox Church, and the Ukrainian Autocephaly. He also set up and is directing the Inter-Orthodox, Inter-Jurisdictional Master Program in Orthodox Ecumenical Theology (ΜΟΕΤ).

=== Awards ===
He was awarded with the highest honour of the municipality of Neapoli, Thessaloniki, for his contribution to the religious and cultural development of his home town, and also from the municipality of Edessa for his overall scientific contribution.

==== Contribution to theological education ====
In 2002, after more than a decade in WOCATI, having also served as member of the executive committee, he was elected WOCATI's president (2002–2008), and for his contribution he was awarded for life the title of its honorary president. His scholarly contribution on the world ecumenical theological education is specified in combining the new challenges with the traditional Christian presuppositions. On the basis of his international experience and the nearly 40 years academic service in Greece he is one of the contributors to the revision of the religious course in the public secondary education (Lyceum) of his country, and a fervent supporter of the constitutional changes in Greek public higher education, and a member of the Association of Professors of the Aristotle University of Thessaloniki.

=== Contributions ===
==== Biblical studies ====
In the field of biblical literature his scholarly speciality was mainly the Sayings of the Historical Jesus, the Q-Document, the Pauline theology, and the theology of Liturgy and Eucharist.

Ηis contribution to the Synoptic (Q) scholarship was mainly his widely accepted and used procedural principles for the reconstruction of the Q-Document and the consequences of the Q Hypothesis, not so much as a solution to the Synoptic Problem, but as a change of the conventional picture of Christian origins. With regard to the Pauline collection project, on the basis of a thorough examination of 2 Corinthians 8-9, he is among those specialized scholars who support the social character of this ancient radical institution of Christianity, the main purpose of which was the ideal of “equal distribution and permanent sharing of the material wealth.” As to the Pauline (and general New Testament) Theology his recommendation is a combination of historical and thematic approach of this discipline, with a parallel recognition and use of such semi- and extra-canonical texts and traditions, as Q and the Gospel of Thomas among others, suggesting what he calls a “Eucharistic Paradigm”.

==== Theology ====
Although his primary scholarly profession is biblical, he has deliberately chosen to engage with the wider theological scholarship. With the decline of the word of God, the Gospel and the overall biblical foundation of the Orthodox theology, mainly as a result of the predominance of the institutional expression of the Church at the expense of her charismatic character, he attempted in many of his works a creative encounter between the later development of the ecclesiastical tradition and the modern theological problematic with the foundational biblical tradition. Realizing the fragmentation of contemporary theological scholarship, and wishing to overcome it, he extended his scholarly and practical engagement to other areas, such as ecumenical movement and theology, missiology, liturgical theology, and world theological education.

Among his characteristic theological propositions is the priority of the eschatological experience of the early Christian community over against its literary products (texts, Bible etc.), although from the time of St. Paul there has been a shift of the center of gravity from the (Eucharistic) experience to the (Christian) message, from eschatology to Christology (and further and consequently to soteriology), from the event (the Kingdom of God), to the bearer and center of this event (Christ, and more precisely his sacrifice on the cross). This basic theological positions of his, i.e. the priority of the horizontal (ecclesiological and eschatological) perspective, both in the N.T. and in the early Church, as well as in later Christian literature, with the vertical soteriological (Pauline?) teaching placed always within the framework of the horizontal eschatological as complementary, has determined his extra-biblical theological activity and research.

Basing his theological endeavour on the foundational, yet marginalized, incarnational Christian doctrine, and maintaining the overcoming the traditional patristic “exclusivity” of modern Orthodox theology, and in addition promoting the necessity of the biblical foundation of the Eucharistic ecclesiology, he adamantly promotes – following the legacy of his Doctor Vater, the late Savvas Agouridis – the Prophetic theology, above and beyond the contemporary classical “theologies”, which dominated his country since the decade of the ‘60s, i.e. the Eucharistic and the therapeutic. In quite a number of his works he opined that the relegation of the biblical word has inevitably resulted in limiting contemporary theology in dilemmas of the type: therapeutic or Eucharistic theology, gerontes/starets or bishop, theosis or sacraments etc. Following the general line of Metropolitan of Pergamon, John (Zizioulas’) Eucharistic ecclesiology for the necessity of the “primacy” on a theological and not just historical basis, he also brought into the fore for reconsideration the views expressed by the pioneer in the field Nicholas Afanasiev, underlining Pneumatological (in addition to the Christological) and the Missiological (beyond the Eucharistic) dimension of the Church, thus coming closer to the theological views supported by the Archbishop Anastasios (Yannoulatos) of Tirana, Durrës and All Albania.

==== Missiologic ====
Based on this position and relying on the biblical data he suggested a reconsideration of the Orthodox position on intercommunio and of the exclusivistic character of the Eucharist, as well as of the Orthodox position on Christian anthropology.

From the mid-80s he promotes a new “paradigm” of Christian witness (mission) in the post-modern era, being at the same time systematically engaged with the Orthodox understanding of the ecumenical theology, underlining the Christian witness as the real Liturgy after the liturgy and insisting on the necessity of the inter-Christian and inter-faith dialogue, and especially the biblical and liturgical renewal.

During the last decade (since 2006, as a member of the WCC program on Poverty-Wealth-Ecology [PWE]) he is specialized and practically engaged in the alternative (to the neo-liberal economic globalization) Christian proposal. His engagement with the interfaith dialogue, and his position for an encounter between Christianity and modernity (and post-modernity) made him aware of the need of a legally established and internationally binding Universal Declaration of Human Responsibilities, along with the Human Rights. He suggested that the interfaith dialogue and cooperation are necessary in the areas, where the “modern paradigm” failed to succeed, i.e. in the spiritual and material welfare of the people, the degradation in social and moral values, in the inability of our world order to enforce a lasting just peace on earth, and especially in its unwillingness to preserve the natural environment, and its surrender to the rules of the dominant world economic system.

== List of books and publications ==
His most influential books are:

- Η περί της Πηγής των Λογίων θεωρία, 1977.
- Σταυρός και Σωτηρία, 1983.
- Χάρις-Κοινωνία-Διακονία, 1985.
- Eucharist and Witness, 1998.
- LOGOI IESOU: Studies in Q, 1999.
- Μετανεωτερικότητα και Εκκλησία: Η Πρόκληση της Ορθοδοξίας, 2002.
- Τα Λόγια του Ιησού: Το αρχαιότερο Ευαγγέλιο, 2005.
- Lex orandi: Λειτουργική θεολογία και λειτουργική αναγέννηση, 2005.
- Παύλος: Τομές στη θεολογία του Α΄, 2004.
- Ενότητα και μαρτυρία: Ορθόδοξη χριστιανική μαρτυρία και διαθρησκειακός διάλογος. Εγχειρίδιο ιεραποστολής, 2007.

Professor Vassiliadis has been member of the translation committee of the Modern Greek Bible Η Αγία Γραφή, Μετάφραση από τα Πρωτότυπα Κείμενα, 1989. He also published collections of studies:

- Βιβλικές ερμηνευτικές μελέτες, 1988.
- Ερμηνεία των Ευαγγελίων: Θεολογικές και ιστορικο-φιλοσοφικές προϋποθέσεις καθώς και ερμηνείες στα τέσσερα Ευαγγέλια, 1990.
- Επίκαιρα αγιογραφικά θέματα: Αγία Γραφή και Ευχαριστία, 2000.

=== E-books ===
- Θέματα Βιβλικής Θεολογίας, 2012.
- Βιβλικά, Ιστορικά και Θεολογικά Ανάλεκτα, 2013.

=== As editor ===
- Ορθόδοξη θεολογία και οικουμενικός διάλογος, 2004.
- Μνήμη Μητροπολίτου Παντελεήμονος Παπαγεωργίου, 2006.
- Orthodox Perspectives on Mission, 2013.
- Ορθόδοξη προσέγγιση για μια θεολογία των θρησκειών, 2014.
