= Isaac Edward Kiev =

Isaac Edward Kiev (1905 in New York, NY – 1975 in New York, NY) was a librarian, a rabbi, and an expert on Hebrew and Judaic literature. For over 50 years, he was the head librarian of Hebrew Union College in New York City, as well as serving as a pulpit rabbi for the Congregation Habonim and as a chaplain at the tuberculosis sanitarium Seaview Hospital from 1927 to 1975.

== Professional life ==
In 1924, Kiev entered the Jewish Institute of Religion under the tutelage of Stephen Wise, and was a bibliographer and cataloger until he was made chief librarian in 1943. After World War Two, Kiev worked with the Jewish Cultural Reconstruction, an organization that distributed heirless Jewish books and artifacts after the Holocaust. He was also president of the Jewish Librarians Association (1951–1959), worked extensively with the Jewish Book Council throughout his career, and served as editor for Library Trends and Studies in Bibliography and Booklore. He also translated the Kafra Haggadah (1949).
