= Nordic Israelism =

Belief about Scandinavian descent

Nordic Israelism or Norse Israelism is the belief that Scandinavian peoples, or the Nordic countries (Sweden, Denmark, Faroe Islands (part of Denmark), Iceland and Norway) descend from the Ten Lost Tribes of Israel. Although there is evidence of such a belief from literature during the Early Modern Period, Nordic Israelism as a movement and ideology only emerged in the latter half of the 19th century among several early proponents of British Israelism.

== History ==
=== Early predecessors ===
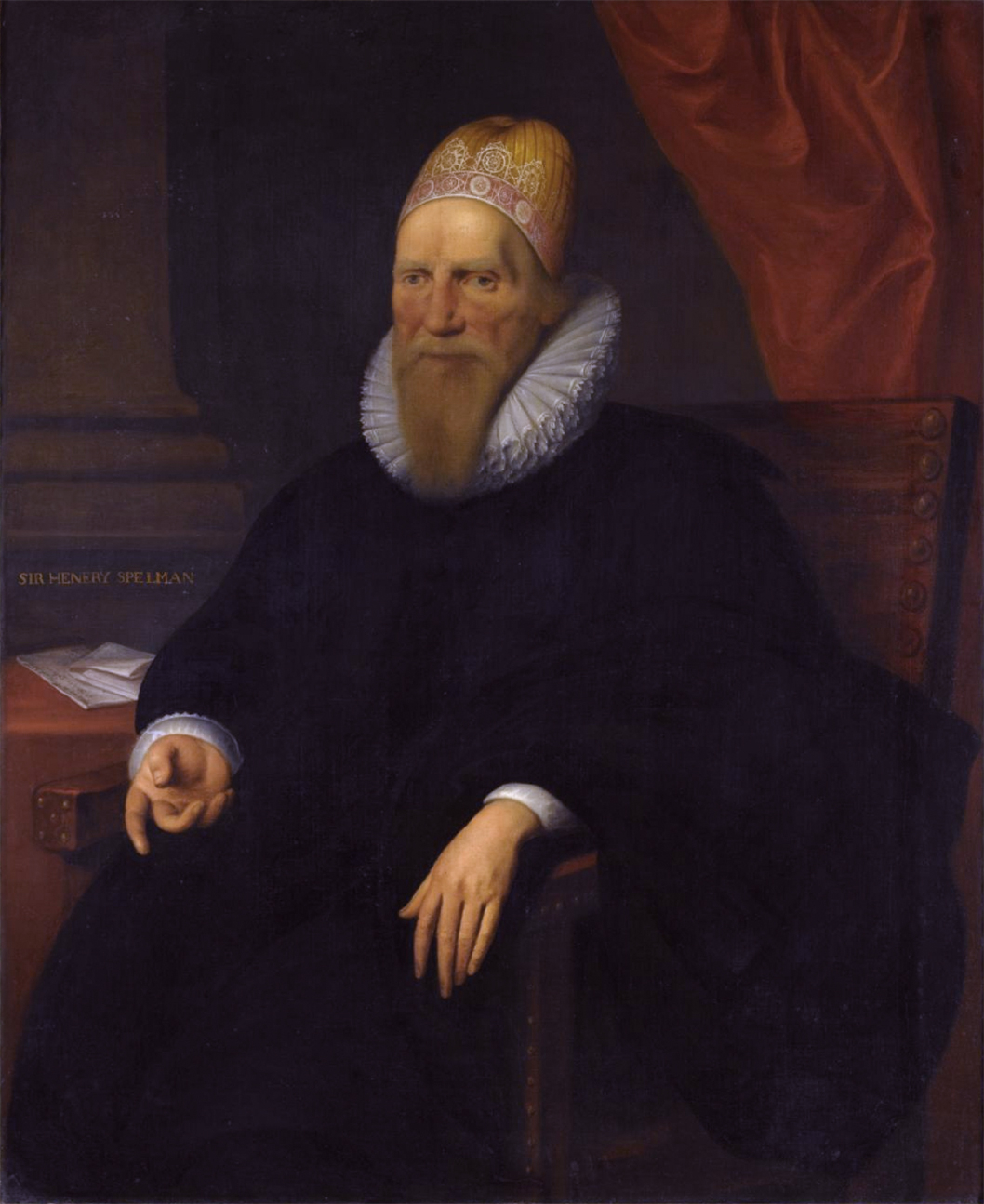
Henry Spelman, who connected the Danes to the Tribe of Dan in 1620.

A 15th-century Latin chronicle, "Chronicon Holsatiae vetus", found in Gottfried Leibniz's Accessiones historicae (1698), states that the Danes were the descendants of the Tribe of Dan, while the Jews were the descendants of the Jutes. Later, in 1620, the antiquarian Henry Spelman also claimed that the Danes were descended from the Israelite Tribe of Dan, based on the apparent similarity between the spelling of the names Dan and Dane.

John Eurenius (1688–1751), a Swedish pastor in Torsåker, Angermanland, Sweden, also connected the Israelites to the inhabitants of the Nordic countries. In his Atlantica Orientalis (1751), he theorized that the Gods of Norse mythology were the deified ancestors of people who migrated from the Levant, especially from Ancient Israel. In the 18th century, Olof Rudbeck the Younger also attempted to prove that the Nordic languages were derived from Hebrew.

=== Birth of the movement, 1850s ===
As an established movement, Nordic Israelism emerged as an offshoot of British Israelism in the 1850s. Key British Israelite authors such as John Cox Gawler and J. H. Allen first identified the Tribe of Dan with Denmark and others with different Scandinavian countries (e.g. Naphtali with Norway), while the remaining tribes they equated with Britain. Other British Israelites such as Edward Hine, however, took a more particularist view, deciding that only the British nation fulfilled the prophecy for Israel and that all the Israelites should be identified with Britain, not Scandinavia. Nonetheless, Hine still believed that the Tribe of Dan had at one stage been in Denmark, from which he believed the name of the country derived, but that Dan's final destined resting place (as well as the other tribes of Israel) was Britain. Other British Israelites took this view, maintaining that the Israelites migrated across Europe, having entered from Asia, leaving their name across various locations, but ultimately their final resting place was Britain. British Israelites who did not subscribe to this more particularist view initially attacked Hine's identifications in The Standard of Israel magazine quarterly of the "Anglo-Israel Association". Later, however, most British Israelites fused their views with the Nordic-Israelism offshoot, as identity groups were set up across Scandinavia promoting the identification of certain Israelite tribes with the Nordic countries and they remained closely linked to British-Israel organisations such as the British-Israel-World Federation.

=== Anna, Sigurd Bjørner and Albert Hiorth ===
Anna Bjørner and Sigurd Bjørner

Anna Larssen Bjørner (1875–1955) and Sigurd Bjørner (1875–1953), the founders of Danish Pentecostalism and the founders of the "Apostolic Church" in Denmark, are considered early pioneers in the history of Nordic-Israelism. In the 1920s, they published Evangeliebladet, a quarterly magazine in which they promoted their belief that the Ten Lost Tribes of Israel were the ancestors of the inhabitants of Denmark as well as the ancestors of the inhabitants of other Scandinavian countries, and they also published some British Israelite literature. Additionally, they regularly published articles which were written by other proponents of Nordic Israelism, including articles which were written by Ole Jørgen Johnsen, a Norwegian preacher from Hasla who authored Israel i de siste dage ("Israel in the Last Days") in 1924.

The renowned author and engineer Albert Hiorth was a prominent promoter of Nordic Israelism during the early 20th century.

=== Contemporary movement ===
Nordisk Israel is a Scandinavian organization which is still active, promoting the Nordic variant of British Israelism.

== Tenets ==
Many of the tenets or beliefs which are at the core of Nordic Israelism cross over with the tenets of British Israelism; however, there are notable differences between Nordic Israelism and British Israelism's identifications of the ten lost tribes.

=== Denmark ===
Proponents of Nordic Israelism accept John Cox Gawler's identification of the Tribe of Dan with Denmark. However, Gawler also placed Dan in Scotland and Ireland, an identification which British Israelites accept, but proponents of Nordic Israelism place more emphasis on the identification of Dan with Denmark.

=== Norway ===
Nordisk Israel identifies the Tribe of Naphtali with Norway.

=== Iceland ===
The pyramidologist Adam Rutherford in 1937 published Iceland's Great Inheritance (1937) in which he connected the Tribe of Benjamin to Iceland. Modern proponents of Nordic Israelism follow this identification, and articles have been published further on the identification.

=== Thor Heyerdahl's Jakten på Odin ===
Modern Nordic Israelites frequently cite Thor Heyerdahl's Jakten på Odin to justify their theories.

== See also ==
- Anglo-Saxonism in the 19th century
- Antisemitism in Sweden
- Assyria and Germany in Anglo-Israelism
- Christian Identity
- Dutch Israelism
- French Israelism
- German Christians (movement)
- Groups claiming affiliation with Israelites
- Khazar hypothesis of Ashkenazi ancestry
- Kinism
- Positive Christianity
- Red Jews
