= John Gawler =

John Gawler may refer to:

- John Cox Gawler, keeper of the Jewel House and British Israelite author
- John Bellenden Ker Gawler, English botanist
