= Groups claiming affiliation with Israelites =

Non-Jewish/Samaritan claimants of Israelite descent

Several groups of people have claimed lineal descent from the Israelites (or Hebrews), an ancient Semitic-speaking people who inhabited Canaan during the Iron Age. The phenomenon has become especially prevalent since the founding of the State of Israel in 1948. The country's Law of Return, which defines Jewishness for the purpose of aliyah, prompted many individuals to claim Israelite ancestry with the expectation that it would make them eligible for Israeli citizenship. The abundance of these claims has led to the rise of the question of "who is a Jew?" in order to determine the legitimacy of one's Jewish identity. Some of these claims have been recognized, while other claims are still under review, and others have been outright rejected.

There were numerous events in Jewish history that forced the Jewish people into exile from the Land of Israel, compelling them to disperse throughout many of the world's regions. The most significant of these events are recorded in the Hebrew Bible, but have been attested by extra-biblical evidence as well. The most notorious exilic occurrences were: the fall of the Kingdom of Israel to the Neo-Assyrian Empire in c. 720 BCE; the fall of the Kingdom of Judah to the Neo-Babylonian Empire in c. 586 BCE; the Roman siege of Jerusalem in 70 CE; and the Bar Kokhba revolt in the 130s CE. A number of these communities of the Jewish diaspora came into existence (sometimes voluntarily) as a result of Israelites and Jews emigrating before the onslaught of invading armies; because of forced deportations; or because of enslavement, including the Assyrian captivity and the Babylonian captivity. Some Jewish families or even some whole Jewish communities were forced to relocate on a near-consistent basis because of anti-Jewish persecution, while many were wiped out entirely. Although some form of contact had been maintained between most of the mainstream Jewish diaspora communities over the millennia, contact had been lost with some of them, and as a result, they came to be regarded as lost by mainstream Jewry.

As a result of the isolation of some Jewish communities, their practices and observances have diverged in some respects. The claims made by individuals and groups to Israelite heritage are rooted in different factors, including race, ethnicity, and religion. Some claim this affiliation on the basis of affinity with the Jewish people, while other groups claim this affiliation independent of this affinity, such as those who base their claim on the legacy of the Ten Lost Tribes.

Modern-day consensus accepts that the Jewish people and the Samaritan people originate from the ancient Hebrew/Israelite civilization; the Jews are affiliated with Judah, whereas the Samaritans are affiliated with Israel. The Israelite religion, known as Yahwism, diverged into what is today known as Judaism and Samaritanism, both of which share an extremely close relationship as ethnic religions with an overlapping theology and tradition.

== Claimed Israelite descent, with lineage proven, recognized as Jewish ==
=== Bukharan Jews ===
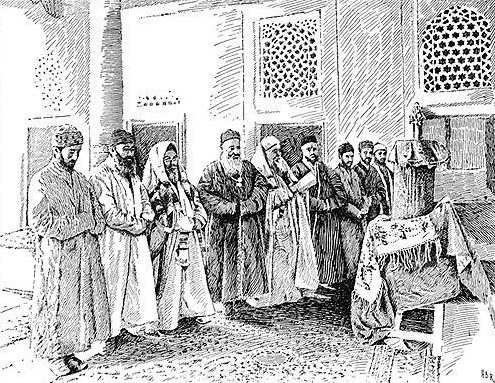
Interior of the Great Synagogue in Bukhara, sketch based on a photograph by Elkan Nathan Adler

According to ancient texts, Israelites began traveling to Central Asia to work as traders during the reign of King David of Jerusalem as far back as the 10th century BCE. Bukharan Jews contain descendants from the Tribe of Naphtali and the Tribe of Issachar of the Ten Lost Tribes, who were exiled during the Assyrian captivity of Israel in the 7th century BCE. Isakharov (in different spellings) is a common surname.

The Bukharan Jews originally called themselves Bnei Israel, which relates specifically to the Israelites of Assyrian captivity. The term Bukharan was coined by European travelers who visited Central Asia around the 16th century. Since most of the Jewish community at the time lived under the Emirate of Bukhara, they came to be known as Bukharan Jews. The name by which the community called itself is "Bnei Isro'il" (Israelites of the Northern Kingdom of Israel). Their Muslim neighbors would call them Yahudi, which is misidentification, since it is specific to the southern Kingdom of Judah, but the Bnei Israel self-designation emphasizes their Israelite origins from the northern Kingdom of Israel.

In 1793, Rabbi Yosef Maimon, a Sephardic Jew originally from Tetuan, Morocco and a missionary kabbalist in Safed, traveled to Bukhara to collect money and spread the Sephardic beliefs amongst the native Israelites of the regions. Prior to Maimon's arrival, the Jews of Bukhara followed the Persian religious tradition. Maimon aggressively advocated that the Israelites of Bukhara adopt Sephardic traditions. Many of the Israelites wanted to keep their ancient Israelite traditions and were opposed to this and the community split into two factions. The followers of the foreign Maimon clan eventually won the struggle against the native Israelites for religious authority, and Bukharan Israelites lost their Israelite traditions and were forced to adopt to Sephardi customs. Some people credit Maimon with causing a revival of Jewish practice among Bukharan Jews which they claim was in danger of dying out. There is evidence that there were Torah scholars present upon his arrival to Bukhara, but because they followed the Persian rite their practices were forcefully rejected as incorrect by Maimon.

=== Cochin Jews ===
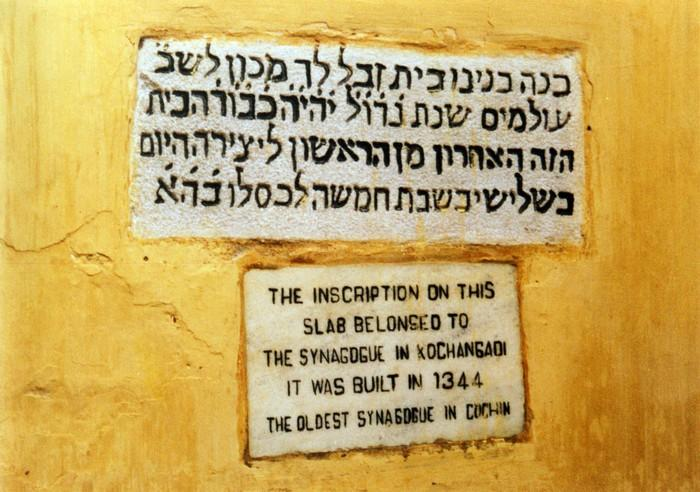
Hebrew inscription at the Synagogue in Cochin.

Israelite traders came to Kerala, India, as early as 700 BCE and settled there. Cochin Jews, also called Malabar Jews, are the descendants of Israelites who settled in the South Indian port city of Cochin. They traditionally spoke Judæo-Malayalam, a form of the Malayalam tongue, native to the state of Kerala. Several rounds of immigration of the Jewish diaspora into Kerala led to a diversity among the Cochin Jews.

Some sources say that the earliest Jews were those who settled in the Malabar Coast during the reign of Solomon, and after the Kingdom of Israel split into two. They are sometimes referred to as the "black Jews". The Paradesi Jews, also called "White Jews", settled later, coming to India from Middle Eastern and European nations such as the Netherlands and Spain, and bringing with them the Ladino language. A notable settlement of Spanish and Portuguese Jews (Sephardim) starting in the 15th century was at Goa, but this settlement eventually disappeared. In the 17th and 18th centuries, Cochin received an influx of Jewish settlers from the Middle East, North Africa and Spain.

An old but not particularly reliable tradition says that Cochin Jews came en masse to Cranganore (an ancient port, near Cochin) after the destruction of the Temple in 70 CE. They had, in effect, their own principality for many centuries until a chieftainship dispute broke out between two brothers in the 15th century. The dispute led neighboring princes to dispossess them. In 1524, the Muslims, backed by the ruler of Calicut (today called Kozhikode), attacked the Jews of Cranganore on the pretext that they were tampering with the pepper trade. Most Jews fled to Cochin and went under the protection of the Hindu Raja there. He granted them a site for their own town that later acquired the name "Jew Town" (by which it is still known).

Unfortunately for the Cochin Jews, the Portuguese occupied Cochin during this same period and they indulged in persecution of the Jews until the Dutch displaced them in 1660. The Dutch Protestants were tolerant, and the Jews prospered. In 1795 Cochin passed into the British sphere of influence. In the 19th century, Cochin Jews lived in the towns of Cochin, Ernakulam, Aluva and Parur.

After India gained its independence in 1947 and Israel was established as a nation, most of the Cochin Jews made Aliyah and emigrated to Israel in the mid-1950s.

== Claimed Israelite descent, with lineage proven, not recognized as Jewish ==
=== Samaritans ===
The Samaritans, once a comparatively large, but now a very small ethnic and religious group, consist of about 850 people who are currently living in Israel and Samaria. They regard themselves as the descendants of the tribes of Ephraim and Manasseh, the sons of Joseph.

Several genetic studies on the Samaritan population have been conducted by using haplogroup comparisons as well as the results of wide-genome genetic studies. Of the 12 Samaritan males who were used in the analysis, 10 (83%) had Y chromosomes which belong to haplogroup J, which includes three of the four Samaritan families. The Joshua-Marhiv family belongs to Haplogroup J-M267 (formerly "J1"), while the Danafi and Tsedakah families belong to haplogroup J-M172 (formerly "J2"), and can be further distinguished by M67, the derived allele of which has been found in the Danafi family. The only Samaritan family not found in haplogroup J was the Cohen family (Tradition: Tribe of Levi), which was identified with the haplogroup E-M78 (formerly "E3b1a M78"). This article predated the change of the classification of haplogroup E3b1-M78 to E3b1a-M78 and the further subdivision of E3b1a-M78 into 6 subclades based on the research of Cruciani, et al.

The 2004 article on the genetic ancestry of the Samaritans by Shen et al. concluded from a sample comparing Samaritans to several Jewish populations, all currently living in Israel—representing the Beta Israel, Ashkenazi Jews, Iraqi Jews, Libyan Jews, Moroccan Jews, and Yemenite Jews, as well as Israeli Druze and Palestinians—that "the principal components analysis suggested a common ancestry of Samaritan and Jewish patrilineages. Most of the former may be traced back to a common ancestor in what is today identified as the paternally inherited Israelite high priesthood (Cohanim) with a common ancestor projected to the time of the Assyrian conquest of the kingdom of Israel."

Archaeologists Aharoni, et al., estimated that this "exile of peoples to and from Israel under the Assyrians" took place during ca. 734–712 BC. The authors speculated that when the Assyrians conquered the Northern Kingdom of Israel, resulting in the exile of many of the Israelites, a subgroup of the Israelites that remained in the Land of Israel "married Assyrian and female exiles relocated from other conquered lands, which was a typical Assyrian policy to obliterate national identities." The study goes on to say that "Such a scenario could explain why Samaritan Y chromosome lineages cluster tightly with Jewish Y lineages, while their mitochondrial lineages are closest to Iraqi Jewish and Israeli Arab mtDNA sequences." Non-Jewish Iraqis were not sampled in this study; however, mitochondrial lineages of Jewish communities tend to correlate with their non-Jewish host populations, unlike paternal lineages which almost always correspond to Israelite lineages.

The Samaritans also retain ancient Israelite traditions that predate Judaic customs and the Oral Law. The Samaritan Pentateuch is preserved in a Paleo-Hebrew derived script that predates the Babylonian exile and further lends credence to the Israelite lineage of the Samaritans. Samaritans adhere to a version of the Torah, known as the Samaritan Pentateuch, which differs from the Masoretic Text in some respects. Sometimes, it differs from the Masoretic Text in important ways, and to a lesser extent, it also differs from the Septuagint. The Samaritans do not regard the Tanakh as an accurate or a truthful history. They only regard Moses as a prophet, speak their own version of Hebrew, and while they do not consider themselves a part of Judaism, the Samaritans do consider Jews fellow Israelites and they also view themselves and Jews as the two authentic houses of Israel. Less archaeological work has been performed on investigating the direction and the regions of the post-Assyrian exile largely because those enthusiastic in pursuing this path of research usually lack skills while archaeologists lack funds; this is contrary to the situation in Israel, where the period of the Judges has been to some degree substantiated by physical finds, and because the interest in pursuing this subject is seen as a semi-mythical pursuit at the edge of serious research. Usually, the lack of archaeological evidence has been explained by the assimilation theory, which proposes that the exiled Israelites adopted so many of the traits of the surrounding cultures and that any unearthed artefacts cannot be linked to them with any certainty.

Since 539 BC, when the Jews began to return from the Babylonian captivity, many Jews have rejected the Samaritan claim of descent from the Israelite tribes; however, some Jews have considered them a sect of Judaism. The advent of genetic studies, the discovery of the Paleo-Hebrew script, and textual comparisons between the Samaritan Pentateuch and the Masoretic text have all made it very difficult to refute the Israelite origin of the Samaritans, causing the majority of the Jewish world in modern times to view the Samaritans as an authentic Israelite group.

== Claimed Israelite descent, with lineage unproven, recognized as Jews ==
=== Bene Israel ===
The Bene Israel claim a lineage to the kohanim, descendants of Aaron. According to Bene Israel tradition, the Bene Israel arrived in India after a shipwreck stranded fourteen Jewish survivors, seven men and seven women, at Navagaon near Alibag, just south of Mumbai in the first century BCE. The families grew and integrated with the local Maharashtrian population, adopting their language, dress and food. They were nicknamed the śaniwar telī ("Saturday oil-pressers") by the local population as they abstained from work on Saturdays, the Jewish Sabbath.

Genetic analysis shows that the Bene Israel of India "cluster with neighbouring autochthonous populations in... western India... despite a clear paternal link between the Bene Israel and the Levant."

=== Beta Israel ===
Beta Israel (Ethiopian Jews) have a tradition of descent from the lost tribe of Dan. Their tradition states that the tribe of Dan attempted to avoid the civil war in the Kingdom of Israel between Rehoboam, son of Solomon and Jeroboam, son of Nebat, by resettling in Egypt. From there they moved southwards up the Nile into Ethiopia, and the Beta Israel are descended from these Danites.

They have a long history of practicing such Jewish traditions as kashrut, Sabbath and Passover (see Haymanot) and for this reason their Jewishness was accepted by the Chief Rabbinate of Israel and the Israeli government in 1975.

They emigrated to Israel en masse during the 1980s and 1990s, as Jews, under the Law of Return, during Israel's Operation Moses and Operation Solomon. Some who claim to be Beta Israel still live in Ethiopia. Their claims were formally accepted by the Chief Rabbinate of Israel, and they are accordingly recognized as Jews.

Genetic studies upon them had found that the Beta Israel as a general community do not cluster with the rest of the world's Jewry; but in fact are indistinguishable from local non-Jewish Ethiopians. The fact that analyses of Ethiopian Jewish DNA cluster separately from other Jewish groups does not rule out gene flow from a presently undetected founder population. It also does not negate the authenticity of their Judaism, since Jewish practice among Ethiopian Jews dates back centuries.

== Claimed Israelite descent, with lineage unproven, not recognized as Jews ==
=== Banu Israil ===
The Banu Israil is a Muslim community found in the state of Uttar Pradesh, India. The name means "Children of Israel", and the community claims descent from the Jewish community of Medina. They belong to the Shaikh caste, and typically carry the surname Israily.

=== Bnei Menashe ===
The Bnei Menashe is a group along the India–Myanmar border who claim to be the descendants of the Tribe of Manasseh. In 2005, members of the Bnei Menashe who have studied Hebrew and who observe the Sabbath and other Jewish laws received the support of the Sephardic Chief Rabbi of Israel in arranging formal conversions to Judaism. Israel approved a plan to take in around 5,800 members of the Bnei Menashe community by 2030.

=== Bene Ephraim ===
The Bene Ephraim, also called Telugu Jews because they speak Telugu, are a small community of Jews living primarily in Kottareddipalem, a village outside Guntur, India, near the delta of the River Krishna.

The Bene Ephraim trace their observance of Judaism back to ancient times, and they recount a history which is similar to that of the Bnei Menashe in the northeastern Indian states of Mizoram and Manipur. They adopted Christianity after the arrival of Baptist missionaries around the beginning of the 19th century.

Since 1981, about 50 families around Kottareddipalem and Ongole (capital of the nearby district of Prakasham) have learned Judaism, learned Hebrew, and have sought recognition from other Jewish communities around the world. Because of the very recent reemergence of this community, and also because of the current overwhelming emphasis on the use of Hebrew as a living language, rather than merely as a liturgical language, the impact of Hebrew on the daily speech of this community has not led to the development, as yet, of a distinctly identifiable "Judæo-Telugu" language or dialect. (See Jewish languages.)

The community has been visited over the years, by several groups of rabbis, who have thus far not seen it fit to extend the same recognition to this community as that which was recently extended to the Bnei Menashe.

=== Falash Mura ===
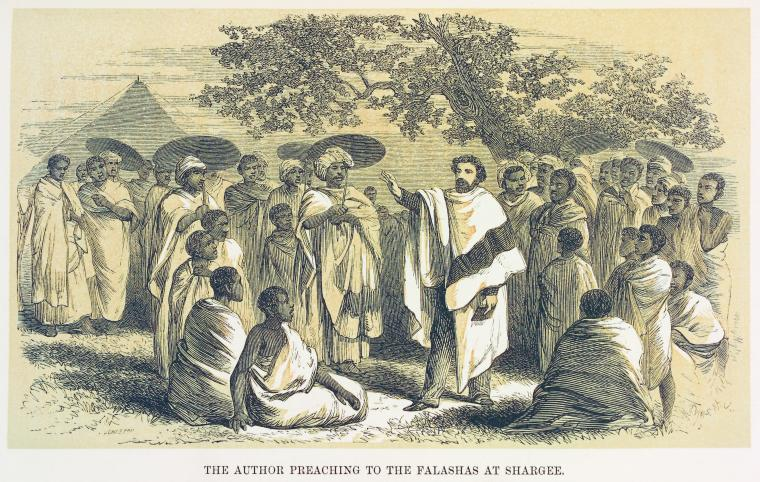
Missionary Henry Aaron Stern preaches Christianity to Beta Israel.

Falash Mura is the name given to descendants of the Beta Israel community in Ethiopia who converted to Christianity, primarily as a consequence of Western proselytization during the late 19th and early 20th centuries. This term also includes Beta Israel who did not adhere to any Ethiopian Jewish practices, as well as the aforementioned historical converts to Christianity. While most voluntarily converted, some were also forcibly converted against their will, or felt compelled to convert due to economic hardship and social exclusion in a majority Christian population.

Many have immigrated to Israel, but there are around 12,000 members of the Beta Israel communities in Addis Ababa and Gondar who are awaiting Aliyah, according to community records and lists compiled by SSEJ, which are in the hands of Israel's Ministry of the Interior.

Around 2010, Israeli officials claimed that many of the Falash Mura converted back to Christianity once safely out of Africa, however activists claimed that most Falash Mura converted to Judaism permanently.

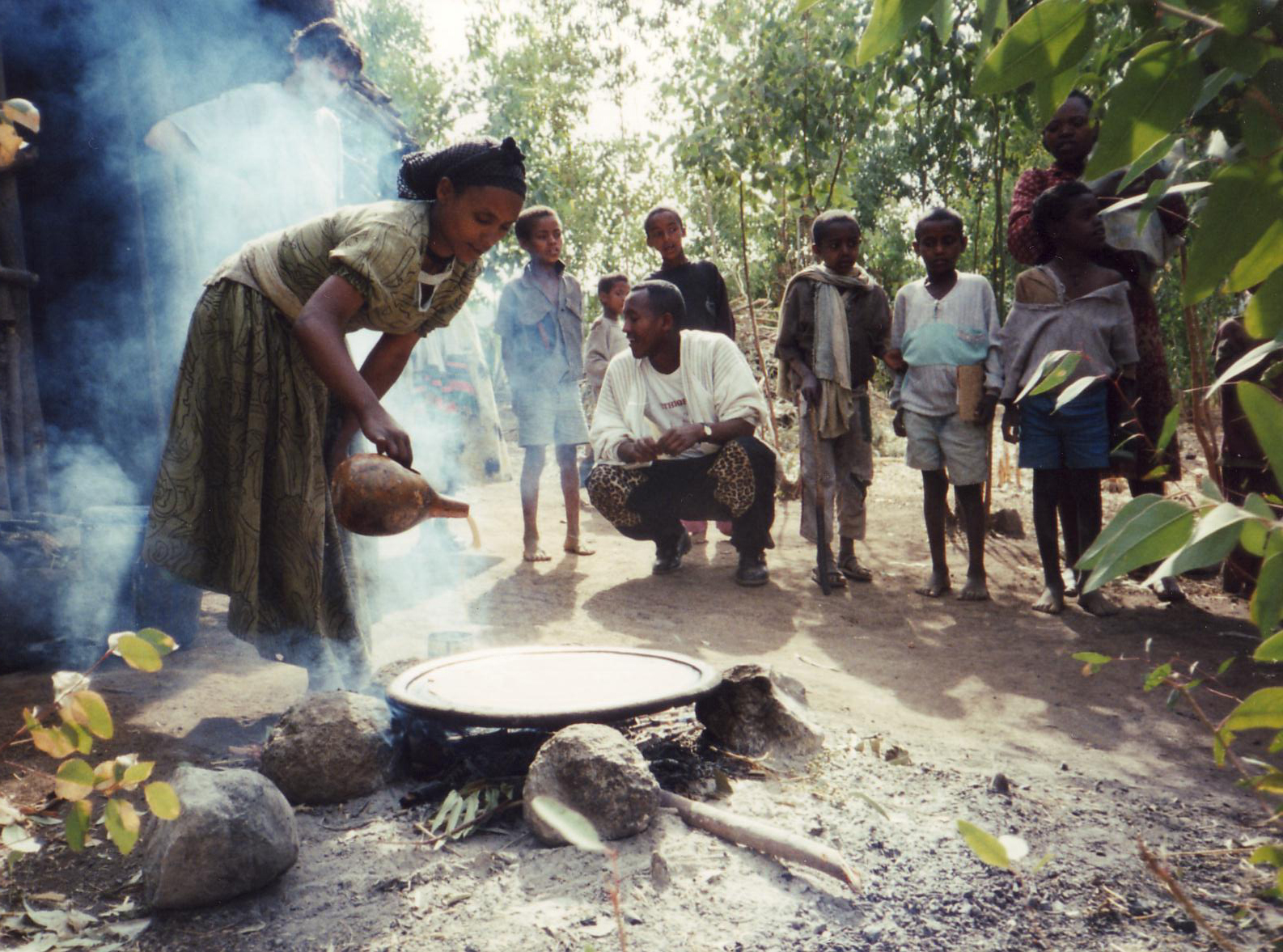
Falash Mura woman making injera in Gondar in 1996.

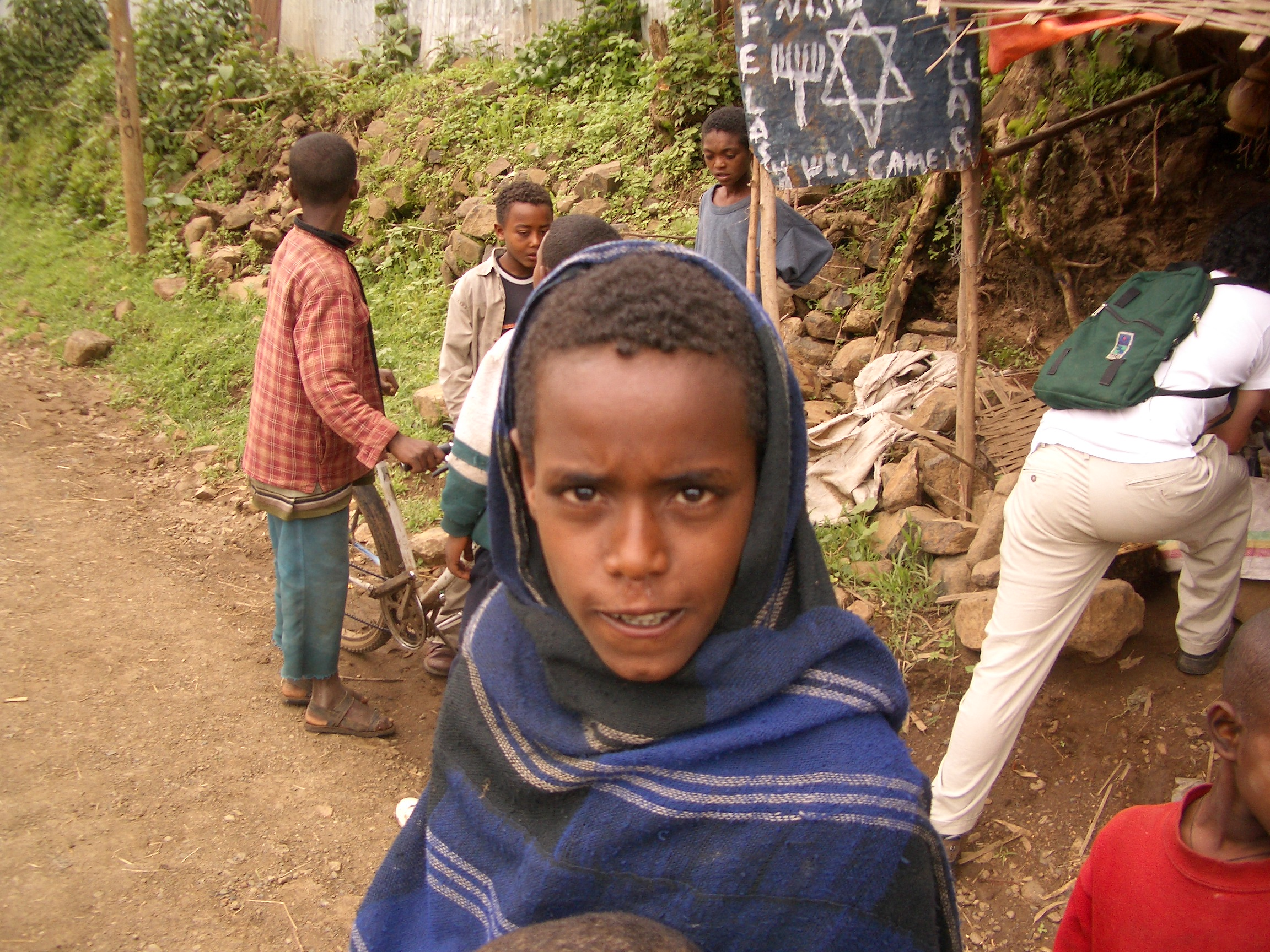
Falash Mura child, 2005

=== Igbo Jews ===
Igbo Jews are members of the Igbo people of Nigeria who practice Judaism. It is a tenet of their beliefs that they have ties to one of the lost tribes of Israel, the tribe of Gad.

Jews have been documented in parts of Nigeria since the precolonial period, but it is not known for the Igbo to have claimed Israelite descent or practiced Judaism prior to colonial times. Significant Igbo identification with Jews concretized during and after the Biafran War (1967–1970).

No formal census has been taken in the region and the precise number of Igbo in Nigeria who practice Judaism is not known. An estimated 30,000 Igbo Jews, having at least 26 synagogues of various sizes, were said to exist in 2008. In 2021 there were said to be approximately 12,000-15,000 practicing Igbo Jews in Nigeria, comprising some 70 active communities. A more conservative figure of at least 2,000-3,000 Igbo practicing Judaism, and at most 5,000, has also been given.

=== Lemba people ===
As recounted in Lemba oral tradition, the ancestor of the Buba clan "had a leadership role in bringing the Lemba out of Israel" and eventually into Southern Africa. A genetic study found that 50% of the males in the Buba clan has the Cohen marker, a proportion higher than that which is found in the general Jewish population. While not defining the Lemba as Jews, the genetic results confirm the oral accounts of ancestral males originating from outside Africa, and specifically from southern Arabia.

More recently, Mendez et al. (2011) observed that a moderately high frequency of the studied Lemba samples carries Y-DNA haplogroup T, which is also considered to be of Near Eastern origin. The Lemba T carriers belonged exclusively to T1b, which is rare and was not sampled in indigenous Jews of the Near East or North Africa. T1b has been observed at low frequencies in the Bulgarian and Ashkenazi Jews as well as in a few Levantine populations.

Recent research published in the South African Medical Journal studied Y chromosome variations in two groups of Lemba, one South African and the other Zimbabwean (the Remba). It concluded that "While it was not possible to trace unequivocally the origins of the non-African Y chromosomes in the Lemba and Remba, this study does not support the earlier claims of their Jewish genetic heritage." The researcher suggested "a stronger link with Middle Eastern populations, probably the result of trade activity in the Indian Ocean."

=== Knanaya ===
Knanaya, a endogamous ethnic group found among the Saint Thomas Christian community, claim to be the descendants of 72 Jewish-Christian families, led by Thomas of Cana, that settled in Kerala.

== Israelite affiliation claimed independent of affiliation with the Jewish people ==
=== Ten Lost Tribes ===
Claims of descent from the Ten Lost Tribes have been made for a variety of non-Jewish groups. These groups include the Pashtuns (see Theory of Pashtun descent from Israelites), the British (see British Israelism and Christian Identity), the French (see French Israelism), the Scandinavians (see Nordic Israelism), the Native Americans (see Jewish Indian theory), the Japanese (see Japanese-Jewish common ancestry theory), and many others.

Similarly, Black Hebrew Israelites are groups of African Americans who claim that they are the descendants of the ancient Israelites. To varying degrees, Black Hebrews adhere to the religious beliefs and practices of both Christianity and Judaism. However, they are not recognized as Jews by the Jewish community, nor are they recognized as Christians. Many of them choose to identify themselves as Hebrew Israelites or Black Hebrews rather than identify themselves as Jews in order to indicate their claimed historic connections.

=== The Church of Jesus Christ of Latter-day Saints ===
Members of the Latter Day Saint movement believe that after they have been baptized and after they have received the Gift of the Holy Ghost, they have become "regathered" as Israelites, either as people who have been recovered from the scattered tribes of Israel, or as Gentiles who have been adopted and grafted into Israel, and as a result, they have become the chosen people of God. Members receive a declaration of lineage (which tribe they belong to) as part of their patriarchal blessing.

These religious denominations are derived from a movement which was launched by Joseph Smith, and almost half of all of their members live in the United States; the movement's members do not strictly believe that they are ethnic Jews as such, instead, they believe that they can use the term Israelites in reference to members of many different cultures, including Jews. They believe that certain Old Testament passages are prophecies which imply that the tribe of Joseph (Ephraim and Manasseh) will play a prominent role in the spreading of the gospel to all scattered Israelites in the last days, and the tribe of Judah will also play a prominent role in the last days as well as during the Millennium.

== See also ==
- Anti-Judaism
- Genetic history of the Middle East
- Genetic studies on Jews
- History of ancient Israel and Judah
- History of the Jews and Judaism in the Land of Israel
- Jewish diaspora
- Jewish ethnic divisions
- Jewish history
- Jewish views on religious pluralism
- Jews as the chosen people
- Judaizers
- Judaism's view of Jesus
- Khazars
- Philosemitism
- Race and appearance of Jesus
- Religious antisemitism
- Religious perspectives on Jesus
- Supersessionism
