= Assyria and Germany in Anglo-Israelism =

Fringe theory that Germans descend from the ancient Assyrians

Edward Hine originated the notion, still current in Anglo-Israelism and some strains of U.S. Christian fundamentalism, that modern Germans are partly descended from the ancient Assyrians. In this belief system, the British are the sole descendants of the Ten Lost Tribes of Israel, in opposition to other Anglo-Israelism advocates who included Germans in the lost tribes. Hine's view, instead, is that the Germans are descendants of the Assyrians. Hine's view, thus, considers the British as the Kingdom of Israel and the Germans as the Neo-Assyrian Empire. Those who believe this hold many pseudohistorical views in an attempt to back this view. This primordialist idea, like the Anglo-Israelism out of which it emerged, has no foundation in modern history, linguistics, or genetics.

== British Israelism ==
The idea can be traced to Edward Hine, an early proponent of British Israelism, deriving the Anglo-Saxons from the Ten Lost Tribes of Israel. The link between British Israelism, Assyrian, and Germanic ties is in a hypothetical sense by British novelist Edward Hine comparing ancient Assyria and neighboring Israel to 20th century Britain and Germany. John Wilson, the intellectual founder of British Israelism, had considered that not only the people of Great Britain, but all the Germanic peoples were descended from the Ten Lost Tribes. Hine took a more particularist view, deciding that only the British nation fulfilled the prophecy for Israel — he acknowledged an ethnic affiliation between Britons and Germans, but thought this reflected what he considered was a close relationship between the ancient Israelites and their neighbors the Assyrians (who had taken the Ten Lost Tribes into captivity in Assyria). Likewise, Britain and Germany's status as two great powers of the modern age he considered reflective of the ancient glories of the Kingdom of Israel and of Assyria. So there were two original competing views as to the relationship between the Germans and British-Israel; either the British people, alone, were identified with the Tribes of Israel (Edward Hine) or they included the Germans (John Wilson) and other European peoples (including the Dutch and Scandinavians). Hine maintained that only the Ten Tribes of Israel were included within the British race and excluded the Continental Teutonic or German peoples, who he instead believed descended from Assyrians not Israelites. Hine believed all the tribes of Israel settled in Britain only, with Manasseh who became the Americans (who mostly descended from British stock). Hine had identified the Ten Tribes as being together in Britain in that Ephraim were the drunkards and ritualists, Reuben the farmers, Dan the mariners, Zebulan the lawyers and writers, Asher the soldiers etc., or that these tribes were regional or local people in Britain. Hine's particularist view was received with some hostility by other British Israelites, who maintained that other Europeans descended from the lost tribes of Israel, not solely Britain.

Hine believed that all of the ancient peoples mentioned in the Bible must also be present in the modern world, in order for the prophecies concerning them to be fulfilled. If a people was "lost" to the ages, it meant simply that the people must have migrated to a new region, changed their ethnonym, and forgotten their history. Hine considered the Assyrians as such a "lost" people (unlike for example, the Egyptians), and he made no mention in his writings of the modern Assyrian community in the Middle East — a community that was largely unknown to Europe in his time. Although Assyria is portrayed as one of the great enemies of Israel in the Bible, Hine took pains to explain that he did not consider Germany to be an enemy of Britain, and his writings do not betray any anti-German feelings. In his Forty Seven Identifications, he did admit 'The Germans are not our enemies, and there is evidence to show that they could not become our enemies'. Later writers in his tradition, however, have often set Germany in the biblical role of Assyria as an enemy to Britain.

British Israelism often compares the militarism of the German Empire with that of the Neo-Assyrian Empire as narrated in the Bible, by analogy establishing Britain, as the threatened party, with the Kingdom of Israel. After World War II, the comparison was also extended to the supposed brutality towards the Jewish population.

== Revision of Assyrian extent of territory ==
Adherents of the Assyria-Germany connection often revise the extent of land the Assyrians controlled (see Neo-Assyrian Empire). British Israelites, for example, who equate Assyria to Germany claim that the Neo-Assyrian Empire extended to the Black Sea region and further north. In reality land controlled by the Assyrians during the Neo-Assyrian Empire did not stretch that far, but only reached into southern, south western and north eastern Anatolia, bordering Armenia. The Assyrians never crossed the Caucasus into Europe based on Assyrian records of the time, and the furthest extent of their conquests would have been the southern borders of the Caucasus and the south eastern edge of the Black sea. However, the Persian Achaemenid Empire, which took control over the Assyrians and Babylonians in the 6th century BC did extend its territory to the Black Sea and north-west into Thrace. British Israelites, however, maintain that this extended territory already existed before the Persians, often quoting as evidence the Periplus of Pseudo-Scylax, which lists Assyria as having already extended to the Black Sea region. British Israelites also cite Pliny the Elder, who mentioned a tribe dwelling around the north-western regions of the Black Sea (Romania or Ukraine) in the 1st century AD called the Assyriani, who they believe were Assyrians.

The Gesta Treverorum record a legend of one Prince Trebeta who allegedly colonized what is today Trier. Taking the legends of Trebeta as having founded Trier in Germany in 2053 BC (1300 years before the establishment of Rome in 753 BC) as literal fact, and revising the extent of the Neo-Assyrian Empire into south-western parts of Europe, British Israelites believe that the ancient Assyrians had a vast territory. To further corroborate this belief, British Israelites often quote from the Austrian Chronicle of 95 Seigneurs (see below).

== Jews deported by Assyrians to Germany ==
British Israelites who adhere to the Assyria-German identification believe that a small portion of Jews were deported to Germany by the Assyrians. They cite II Kings 18: 13 which notes that the Assyrian king Sennacherib sacked several cities of Judah and captured several Jewish inhabitants. This deportation has been verified by archaeology, since an ancient Assyrian prism records Sennacherib deported a population of Judah (see Taylor and Sennacherib Prisms). This population of Judah was deported (with the House of Israel) to the Medes but British Israelites believe that the Jews and Israelites who were deported by the Assyrians to the Medes, did not stay there, but migrated over time into parts of Europe.

The 14th-century Austrian Chronicle of 95 Seigneurs is usually cited by British Israelites, as it purports to trace an early Jewish settlement in Germany or Austria. The Chronicle connects the Dukes of Austria with the Jews rather than the Assyrians but states that Central Europe became to accept the Jewish faith or Jewish customs from 708 to 704 BC. British Israelites provide an answer for this: they believe since the Assyrians had long controlled parts of Europe (especially Germany) that the Germans or Austrians became to accept Jewish customs and faith in the 8th century BC because Sennacherib (who captured several cities in Judah) had deported its Jewish inhabitants into Eastern Europe along the Danube River, eventually reaching Austria and Germany. The Chronicle lists 'Jewish Kings' who began from 708 to 704 BC during which a duke called Gennan converted to Judaism. Consequently, this Jewish population intermarried with the local rulers in the regions of Austria and Hungary, the pagans were subdued and the whole country was Jewish until c. 227 CE.

Often cited to support these theories, is the legend of Judaesaptan. According to the Jewish Virtual Library, this was a legendary Jewish kingdom, which several thousands of years ago sat in Austria or central Europe; it first appeared in writing in Gottfried Hagen's chronicle Reimchronik (1270).Wolfgang Lazius in the 16th century attempted to find the remains of the kingdom but was unsuccessful.

== Anglo-Saxons not Germanic ==
British Israelites who are proponents of Hine's German-Assyria connection do not believe that the Anglo-Saxons were Germanic, but instead of Scythian heritage, who ultimately descended from the ancient Israelites. Hine pointed out that the Anglo-Saxons only spoke a Germanic language, and that the term 'German' was an exonym and that the Saxons were distinct to the other continental Germanic tribes. Hine believed that the Anglo-Saxons were only in Germany for a short time as part of their migration to the appointed 'Islands' (which he identified as Britain) as their final resting place, as told where the Israelites would be resettled in Isaiah 24: 15; 42: 4; 49: 1; 51: 5 and Jeremiah 31: 10.

== Worldwide Church of God ==
Herbert W. Armstrong in Chapter 5 of his Mystery of Ages (1985), "The Assyrians settled in central Europe, and the Germans, undoubtedly, are, in part, the descendents of the ancient Assyrians." (p. 183). In this, Armstrong draws upon the opinions of Herman L. Hoeh, published in his 1963 Compendium of World History.

Such suggestions are informed by Jerome's simile with Psalms 83:8.

Hoeh (1963) draws on Verstegan (1605) and Johannes Turmair (1526) to conclude that Deutsch really derives from Tuisto whom he in turn identifies with Shem:

Tuitsch or Tuisto: Chief of thirty-two dukes. Noah gave him all the land between the Don River and the Rhine or what was called Grossgermania. This is the beginning of the 'neolithic' settlement of Europe. Tuitsch is, according to all ancient German commentaries and chronicles, a son of Noah. But which son? Noah adopted Tuitsch's children as his own. The ancient Germans understood the name Tuitsch to be the title 'Teacher.' He was therefore the great patriarch of his family who taught the divine will to his children. Tuitsch is the father of Mannus (who is the Assyrian Ninus). The son of Mannus, Trebeta, is the same man who is called the son of Ninus in classical writers. The son of Mannus or Ninus — Trebeta — built Trier, the first town of Germany. Since the Bible calls this Ninus (who built Nineveh), Asshur, Tuitsch is therefore Shem! (Hoeh 1963 vol. 2 ch. 2)

== Controversy ==
As with Anglo-Israelism itself, proposed German-Assyrian connections enjoy no empirical support and as such, do not reflect the beliefs of mainstream historians, anthropologists, archaeologists or historical linguists. Those who disagree with the idea of a German-Assyrian connection consider the entire belief system to be an element of pseudohistory.

== See also ==
- Ashkenazim
- Khazar theory
- Red Jews
- Seyfo
