= Alexander James Ferris =

Alexander James Ferris or A. J. Ferris was an author on British Israelism. His most successful work When Russia Bombs Germany (1940) sold over 60,000 copies.

He is a graduate of the University of New Zealand.

== When Russia Bombs Germany ==
A. J Ferris in his When Russia Bombs Germany (1940) wrote that the Book of Revelation contains cryptic references to the defeat of Nazi Germany and bombing of their cities. The work sold over 60,000 copies and was very popular amongst Christians. George Orwell however negatively reviewed the work and considered Ferris to be a "religio-patriotic lunatic".

== Works ==
- Armageddon is at the doors (1933)
- British-Israel teaching concerning the "Signs of the approaching end of the age" (1933)
- Why the British are Israel: nine conclusive facts proving that the Anglo-Saxons represent the House of Israel of scripture (1934)
- British-Israel teaching concerning the Great Pyramid of Gizeh (1934)
- The Everlasting Throne of David (1935)
- The Second Advent. How: when: where? (1935)
- The great pyramid: a simple explanation of the divine message of the great pyramid to the Anglo-Saxon race (1935)
- The Book of Revelation (1936)
- The coronation and the throne of David (1940)
- When Russia Bombs Germany (1940)
- Great Britain & The U.S.A. Revealed as Israel The New Order (1941)
- The British Commonwealth & The United States Foretold in The Bible (1941)
- Books which convince (1941)
- The great tribulation: past, present or future? (1941)
- Germany's Doom Foretold (1942)
- When Russia invades Palestine (1945)
- What is wrong with the churches?: and the remedy (1946)
- Palestine for Jew or Arab? (1946)
- Deliverance from Russia: how it will come (1947)
- The Three-Headed Eagle. A foreview of the nations of Europe and their destiny according the prophet Esdras (1944)
- The Assyrian in Bible prophecy (1950)
- Elijah the prophet is nigh at hand (1951)
- Daniel's seventieth week, or the years 1951 to 1958 in prophetic chronology (1951)
- The jubilee, 1957-1958 (1954)
- The resurrection of the twelve apostles (1955)
- Peace: how it will come; or, Why there will be no third world war (1956)

== See also ==
- William Pascoe Goard
- John Cox Gawler
