= Edward Wheler Bird =

Edward Wheler Bird (16 April 1823 – 21 May 1903) was a British civil servant in the Indian Civil Service.

He was born in Trichinopoly, British India, in 1823, the son of John Bird, a provincial judge, and Mary. He returned to London for schooling and is listed in London's University College School's alumni as having attended from '32-38 and being "a great Tamil scholar." He went back to India for a career in the Madras Civil Service and is listed as having been "special assistant to collector and magistrate, Masulipatam."

In 1868, he retired from civil service and moved to Bristol, where he became involved in various missionary organizations, including the London Society for Promoting Christianity Amongst the Jews and the Bible Society.

Bird became active in the British Israelite Movement in 1874, after having read a book by John Wilson. He helped found the Anglo-Israel Association, which merged with the Anglo-Ephraim Association in 1878. Bird became president of the newly formed Metropolitan Anglo-Israel Association. He oversaw an excavation of the Hill of Tara that caused irreparable damage in the early years of the 20th century.

He died at his home, Woodcote Villa, in Tyndall's Park, Bristol.

== See also ==
- Edward Hine
