= Austrian Chronicle of the 95 Rulers =

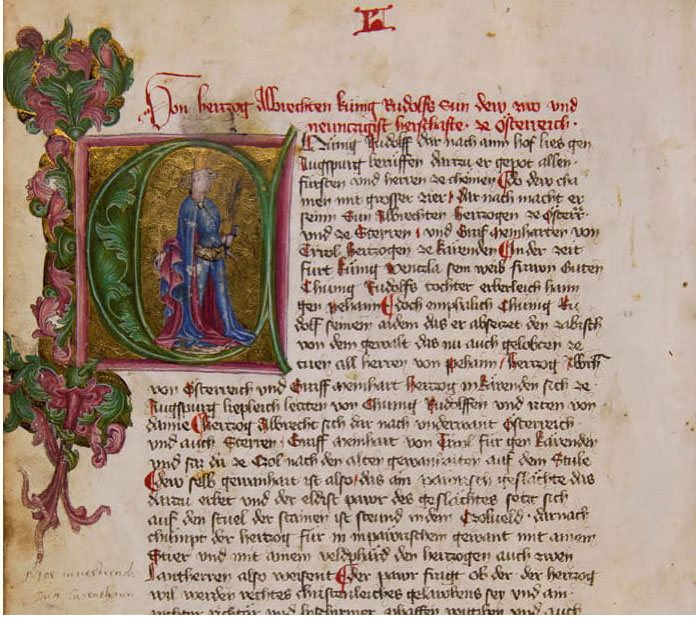
Rudolf I (Innsbruck, Universitäts- und Landesbibliothek Tirol, Cod. 255, fol. 65v)

The Austrian Chronicle of the 95 Rulers (Österreichische Chronik von den 95 Herrschaften ) of Leopold von Wien (formerly known as Leopold Steinreuter) of Vienna (lived ca. 1340–1400) is a 14th-century chronicle compiled by order of Albert III, Duke of Austria.

The chronicle is notable for recording legendary history from the time of Noah, constructing an ancestry of the Dukes of Austria connecting them with biblical rulers of the Kingdom of Israel. It exerted considerable influence on 15th century Austrian historiography, a fact underscored by its preservation in more than 50 manuscripts (among these Cod. 2820 foll. 33ra–171vb in the Austrian National Library).

In the 16th and 17th centuries, the popularity of the chronicle waned rapidly due to its assumed fictional content, and it remained unedited until the early 20th century.

Since its edition, it has played a certain role in proving Biblical history, particularly in US American Biblical literalism, in publications such as those of Herman L. Hoeh and Herbert W. Armstrong of the Worldwide Church of God, who took the chronicle's genealogies at face value to postulate that, e.g.,

"European civilization — and its history — is as old as Egypt's. But it has been suppressed. Not since the close of the seventeenth century has it been allowed to be taught publicly." (Hoeh (1963), vol. 2 ch. 3 )

== Edition ==
- Joseph Seemüller (ed.), "Österreichische Chronik von den 95 Herrschaften", Monumenta Germaniae Historica (Deutsche Chroniken 6.1, 1909), 1980 reprint: ISBN 3-921575-53-2 (facsimile)

== See also ==
- British Israelism
