= John Pym Yeatman =

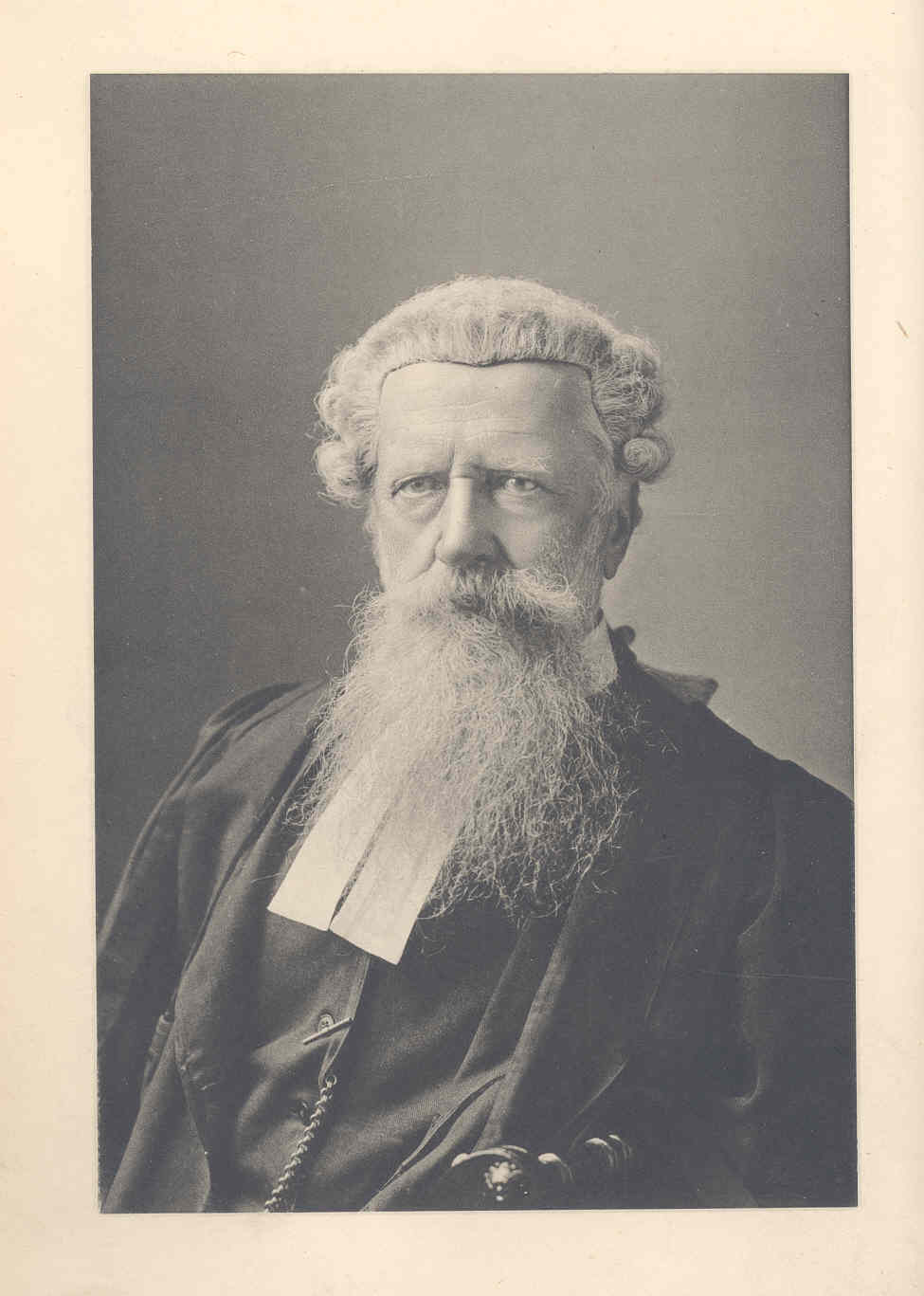
John Pym Yeatman

John Pym Yeatman (1830–1910) was a barrister and influential proponent of British Israelism. He has been described as "outspoken, quarrelsome, no respecter of rank and reputation and cursed with a self-destructive streak".

== Life ==
Yeatman obtained a degree in law at Emmanuel College, Cambridge and later became a Fellow of the Royal Historical Society, he authored several successful works on law and history. His An Introduction to the Study of Early English History (1874) was widely read upon its release and received favourable reviews by historians.

Yeatman married Charlotte McDonough, daughter of Captain Alan McDonough, of Athgarvan Lodge, Curragh, Ireland. The Yeatmans both converted to Catholicism.

Yeatman worked as a lawyer in the Midlands Circuit, but resigned after a dispute in which he supported another lawyer. When he applied for readmission, he was rejected. Blaming Lord Esher for his woes, Yeatman accused him of participation with others in a "conspiracy to destroy his career", claiming "an additional 10,000 pounds for alleged slander from the bench". He was unsuccessful. Yeatman pursued his vendetta against Esher in The Judicature Quarterly Review, only one issue of which ever appeared, published in January 1896 and entirely written by Yeatman. The contents were noted for "pouring vitriol over all and sundry", but especially Esher.

In his book The Gentle Shakspere: A Vindication, Yeatman attempted to prove that Shakespeare was a devout Roman Catholic whose works communicated his beliefs and who hated Queen Elizabeth. He also claimed that Shakespeare could not have written the sonnets because they were irreligious. Yeatman wrote the 300 page work in three weeks with, he admitted, only little research, saying "I have written this book with very little preparation, and with only a previous very general knowledge of the works of Shakspere". Critics were scathing, citing numerous errors. Yeatman claimed he was being discriminated against because of his own Catholicism, and unsuccessfully sued the Saturday Review for libel.

He later turned to writing on British Israelism, which due to his earlier literature success and membership of the Royal Historical Society won over many converts.

== Works ==
=== Law ===
The history of the Common Law of Great Britain and Gaul (1874)
An exposure of the mismanagement of the Public record office (1875)
Some observations upon the law of ancient demesne (1884)

=== History ===
An Introduction to the Study of Early English History (1874)
The early genealogical history of the House of Arundel (1882)
The Feudal History of the County of Derby (1886)
The history of the borough of Chesterfield (1890)

=== British Israelism ===
The Shemetic Origin of the Nations of Western Europe (1879)

== See also ==
- Dominick McCausland
- Edward Hine
