= John Wilson (Israelist) =

Proponent of British Israelism (1799–1870)

- Born: June 8, 1799; Kilmarnock, Scotland
- Died: January 22, 1870 (aged 70); Brighton, England
- Notable work: Our Israelitish Origin
- Movement: British Israelism

John Wilson (8 June 1799 – 22 January 1870) was a proponent of the British Israelism movement, along with Edward Wheler Bird and Edward Hine.

Wilson was a self-educated man. In 1840, he published Our Israelitish Origin, a book of his lectures, in which he claimed that the Ten Lost Tribes of Israel had made their way from the Near East, across the continent of Europe, to the British Isles. He believed the Northern European people to be descended from the Ten Lost Tribes, with the people of Britain being the Tribe of Ephraim. Wilson relied on philological "evidence" of English, Scottish, and Irish words that were similar to Hebrew words, even though he lacked formal training in language or seminary.

It was in Wilson's house in St Pancras, London, that the Anglo-Israel Association was founded in 1874.

On the death of Wilson's daughter in 1904, his manuscripts passed into the possession of Rev. A. B. Grimaldi.
