= Tribe of Dan =

One of the twelve Tribes of Israel

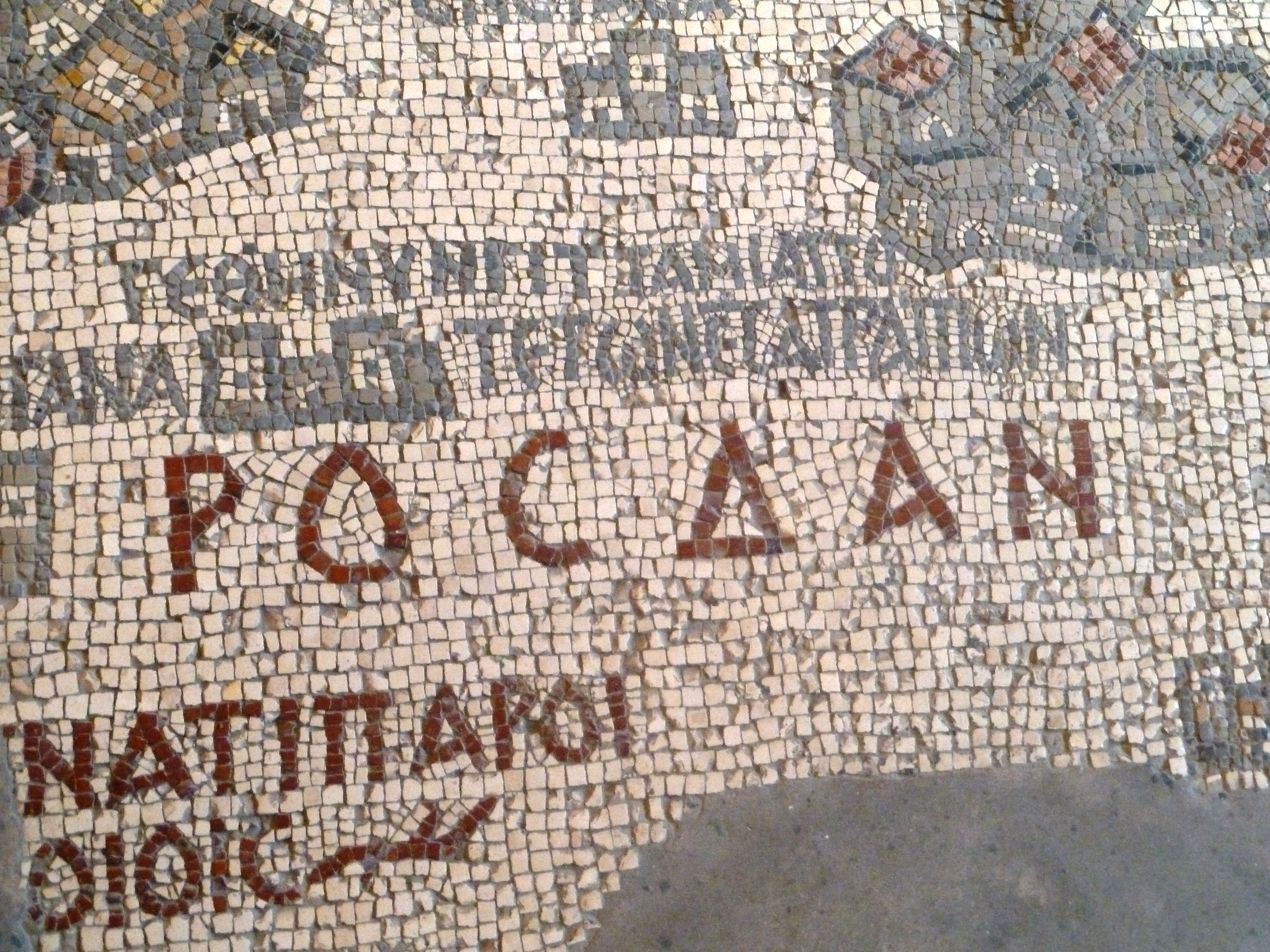
[Kle]ros Dan, "Dan's lot," marked on the 6th-century Madaba Map. Above it (to the east) is Geth, now Gitta, one of the five satrapies. The sea is to the west (bottom).

The Tribe of Dan (Hebrew: דָּן, "Judge") was one of the twelve tribes of Israel, according to the Torah. According to the Hebrew Bible, the tribe initially settled in the hill lands bordering Ephraim and Benjamin on the east and Judah and the Philistines on the south but migrated north due to pressure of their enemies, settling at Laish (later known as Dan), near Mount Hermon.

Biblical judge Samson was a hero of the Dan tribe.

== Biblical narrative ==
The initial territory of Dan appears in dark green north of Philistia on this map of the tribes.

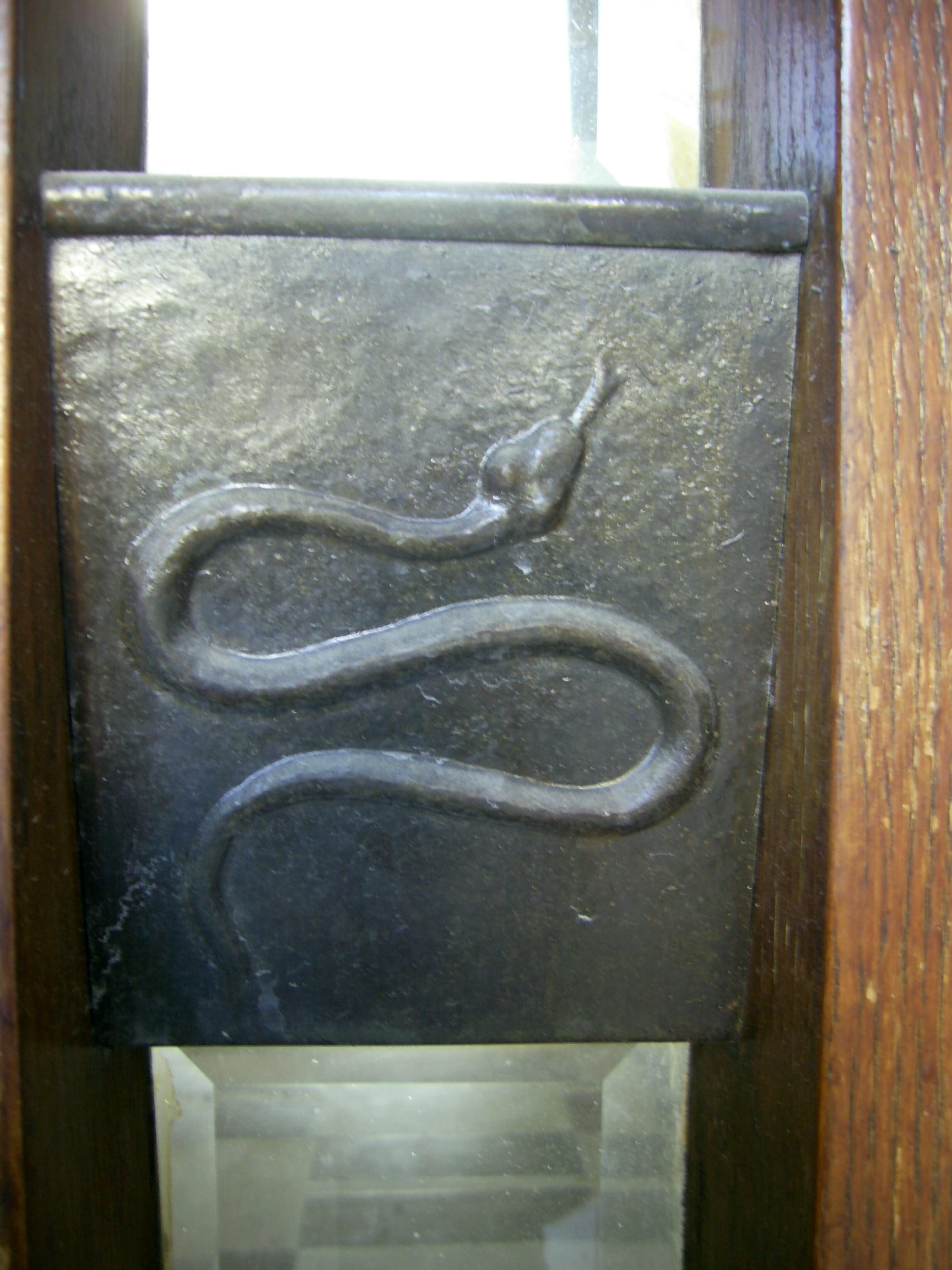
The Dan tribe's serpent plate on the Heichal Shlomo's door in Jerusalem.

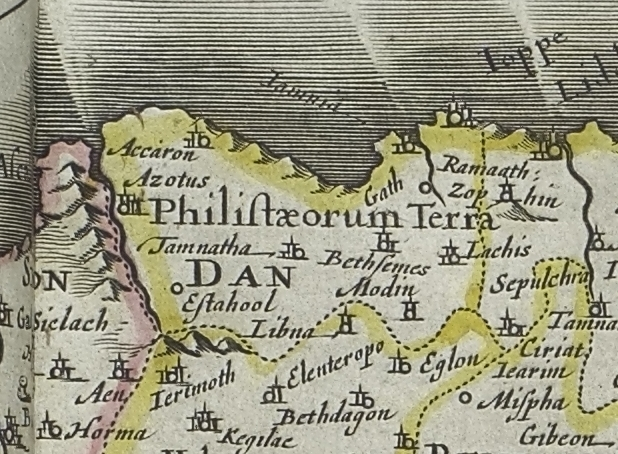
Map of Dan, 17th century Dutch map

In the Biblical census of the Book of Numbers, the tribe of Dan is portrayed as the second largest Israelite tribe (after Judah). Some textual scholars regard the census as being from the Priestly Source, dating it to around the 7th century BC, and more likely to reflect the biases of its authors. In the Blessing of Moses, which some textual scholars regard as dating from only slightly earlier than the deuteronomist, Dan is prophesied to "leap from Bashan"; scholars are uncertain why this should be since the tribe did not live in the Bashan plain, east of the Jordan River.

=== Conquest and territory ===
According to the biblical narrative, following the completion of the conquest of Canaan by the Israelite tribes after about 1200 BC, Joshua allocated the land among the twelve tribes. Dan was the last tribe to receive its territorial inheritance. The land originally allocated to Dan was a small enclave in the central coastal area of Canaan, between Judah, Benjamin, Ephraim and the Philistines.

To the north the territory of Dan abutted Joppa, the modern Jaffa. This territory, not very extensive originally, was soon diminished by its dangerous neighbors, the Philistines. The tribe was only able to camp in the hill country overlooking the Sorek Valley, the camp location becoming known as Mahaneh Dan ("Camp of Dan"). (Joshua 19) The region they were trying to settle extended south into the Shephelah in the area of Timnah; as a result, the modern state of Israel refers to the region as Gush Dan ("the Dan area").

The Danites' lot included all that part of the valley which respects the sun-setting, and were bounded by Azotus and Dora; as also they had all Jamnia and Gath, from Ekron to that mountain where the tribe of Judah begins.

From after the conquest of the land by Joshua until the formation of the first united Kingdom of Israel in c. 1050 BC, the Tribe of Dan was a part of a loose confederation of Israelite tribes. No central government existed, and in times of crisis the people were led by ad hoc leaders known as Judges.

The most celebrated Danite was Samson, a Danite judge from the period of settlement in the lands allotted by Joshua. Pnina Galpaz-Feller sees similarities between the story of Samson and Denyen tribal legends. Excavations conducted at Tel Dan by David Ilan of the Hebrew Union College show support for the Danites' potential Aegean connections. In Greek mythology, the Denyen and Tribe of Dan are associated with the Libyan King Danaus.

As a consequence of the pressure from the Philistines, a portion of the tribe abandoned hopes of settling near the central coast, instead migrating to the north of Philistine territory, and after conquering Laish, refounded it as the city of Dan (Judges 18). Thus their territory in the end lay northeast of that of Naphtali, east of the upper Jordan River, near its eastern sources, and defining the northern extent of the land of the Israelites. A number of biblical texts thus refer to "All Israel, from Dan to Beersheba".

=== United Monarchy ===
With the growth of the threat from Philistine incursions, the Israelite tribes decided to form a strong centralised monarchy to meet the challenge, and the Tribe of Dan joined the new kingdom with Saul as the first king. After the death of Saul, all the tribes other than Judah remained loyal to the House of Saul. But after the death of Ish-bosheth, Saul's son and successor to the throne of Israel, the Tribe of Dan joined the other northern Israelite tribes in making David, who was then the king of Judah, king of a re-united Kingdom of Israel. The tribe provided substantial military support for the kingdom in the form of 28,600 soldiers, being considered "experts in war".

=== Northern Kingdom of Israel ===
However, on the accession of Rehoboam, David's grandson, in c. 930 BC the northern tribes split from the House of David to re-form a Kingdom of Israel as the Northern Kingdom.

=== Assyrian conquest and demise ===
The Neo-Assyrian Empire conquered the territory of Dan as part of the Kingdom of Israel. Many were exiled into the Assyrian captivity; Dan is considered one of the Ten Lost Tribes. Some of the Dan's inhabitants fled south into the Kingdom of Judah, gradually assimilating into the kingdom's population.

== Claims of descent from Dan ==
A 15th-century Latin chronicle, "Chronicon Holsatiae vetus", found in Gottfried Leibniz's Accessiones historicae (1698), states that the Danes were of the Tribe of Dan. The antiquarian Henry Spelman in 1620 had made a similar claim that the Danes were the Israelite Tribe of Dan, based on the apparent similarity in name. Additionally, proponents of Nordic and British Israelism have made similar claims about descent from the tribe of Dan. British Israelite authors such as John Cox Gawler and J. H. Allen identified the Tribe of Dan with Denmark. While another prominent British Israelite author, Edward Hine, took the view that the tribe of Dan had colonized Denmark and Ulster in Ireland. Modern proponents of British Israelism continue to identify both the Danes and the Irish with the Tribe of Dan.

Some of the Ethiopian Jews, also known as Beta Israel, claim descent from the Tribe of Dan, whose members migrated south along with members of the tribes of Gad, Asher, and Naphtali, into the Kingdom of Kush, now Ethiopia and Sudan, during the destruction of the First Temple. This position is supported by former Sephardic Chief Rabbi Ovadia Yosef. They are said to have fought with the natives.

== Characteristics ==
The primary characteristic of the tribe of Dan was seafaring. In the Song of Deborah the tribe is said to have stayed on their ships with their belongings. Animal magnetism has been attributed to the tribe.

== Iconography ==
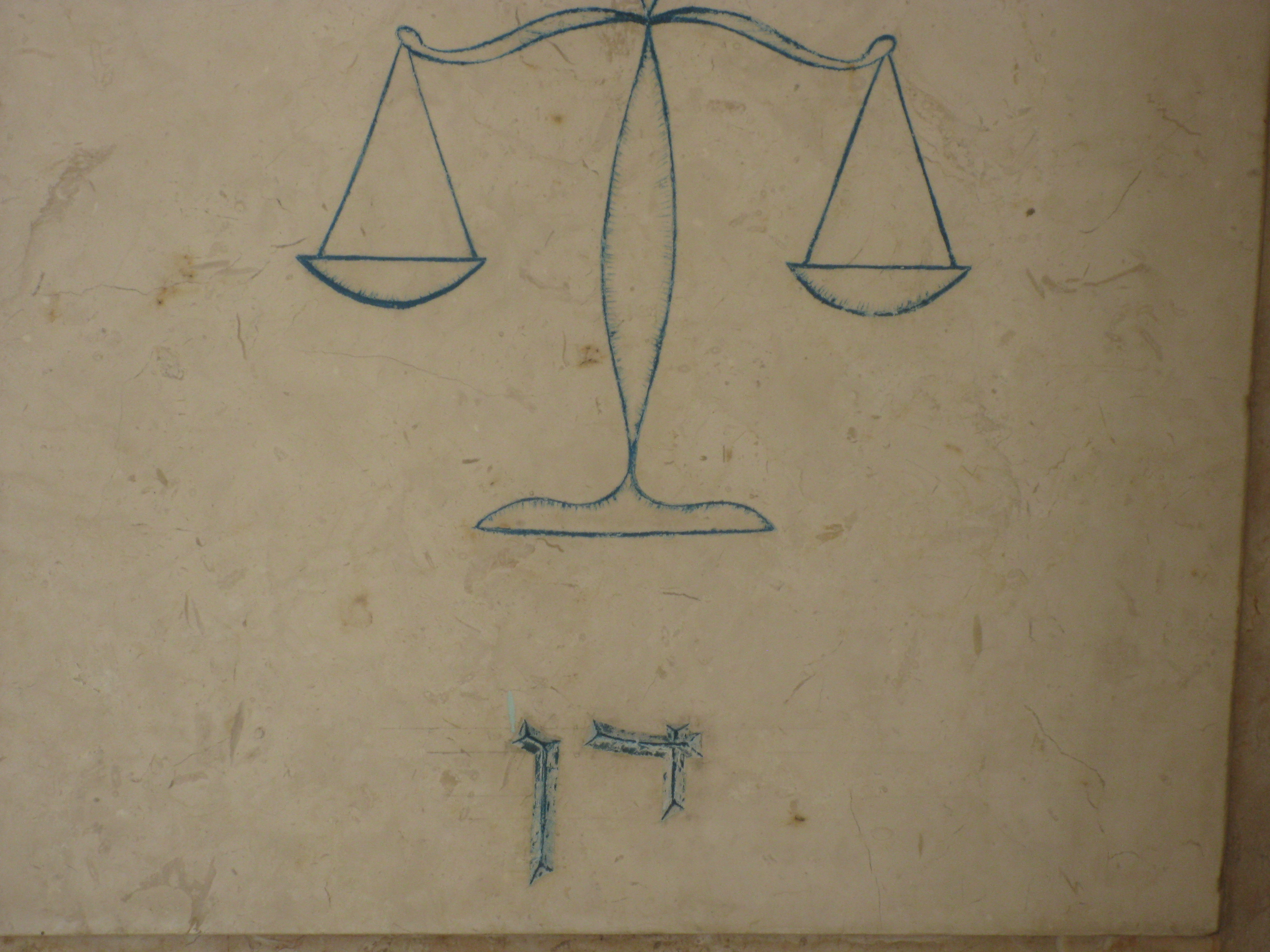
The scales of justice emblem of the tribe of Dan.

Modern artists use the "scales of justice" to represent the Tribe of Dan due to Genesis 49:16 referencing Dan "shall achieve justice for his kindred". More traditional artists use a snake to represent Dan, based upon Genesis 49:17, "Let Dan be a serpent by the roadside, a horned viper by the path, That bites the horse's heel, so that the rider tumbles backward."

== Book of Revelation ==
Revelation 7:4–8 prophecies that people from the twelve tribes of Israel will be marked on the forehead with the seal of God. The list does not mention the tribe of Dan, although it was included among the twelve tribes described as having settled in the Promised Land in the book of Joshua. It has been suggested by some biblical scholars that this omission could be a punishment for pagan practices conducted by the tribe. This led Irenaeus, Hippolytus of Rome and some Millennialists to propose that the Antichrist will come from the tribe of Dan.

== See also ==
- Book of Judges
- British Israelism
- Dan (biblical figure)
- Denyen
- Ten Lost Tribes
