= Ten Lost Tribes =

Israelites exiled from ancient Israel by the Assyrians

The Ten Lost Tribes were those from the Twelve Tribes of Israel that were said to have been exiled from the Kingdom of Israel after it was conquered by the Neo-Assyrian Empire around 720 BCE. They were the following tribes: Reuben, Simeon, Dan, Naphtali, Gad, Asher, Issachar, Zebulun, Manasseh, and Ephraim – all but Judah and Benjamin, both of which were based in the neighbouring Kingdom of Judah, and therefore survived until the Babylonian siege of Jerusalem in 587 BCE. Alongside Judah and Benjamin was part of the Tribe of Levi, which was not allowed land tenure, but received dedicated cities. The exile of Israel's population, known as the Assyrian captivity, was an instance of the long-standing resettlement policy of the Neo-Assyrian Empire implemented in many subjugated territories.

The Jewish historian Josephus wrote that "there are but two tribes in Asia and Europe subject to the Romans, while the ten tribes are beyond Euphrates till now, and are an immense multitude, and not to be estimated by numbers." In the 7th and 8th centuries CE, the return of the Ten Lost Tribes was associated with the concept of the coming of the Hebrew Messiah. Claims of descent from the "lost tribes" have been proposed in relation to many groups, and some Abrahamic religions espouse a messianic view that Israel's tribes will return.

In Samaria many Israelites survived the Assyrian conquest and remained in the land. The Samaritans, developed as a distinct religious community in the region and trace their ancestry to the ancient Israelites.Persistent claims have been made that some of the lost tribes survived as distinct entities. Zvi Ben-Dor Benite, a professor of Middle Eastern history at New York University, states: "The fascination with the tribes has generated, alongside ostensibly nonfictional scholarly studies, a massive body of fictional literature and folktale." Anthropologist Shalva Weil has documented various differing tribes and peoples claiming affiliation to the Ten Lost Tribes throughout the world.

== Scriptural basis ==
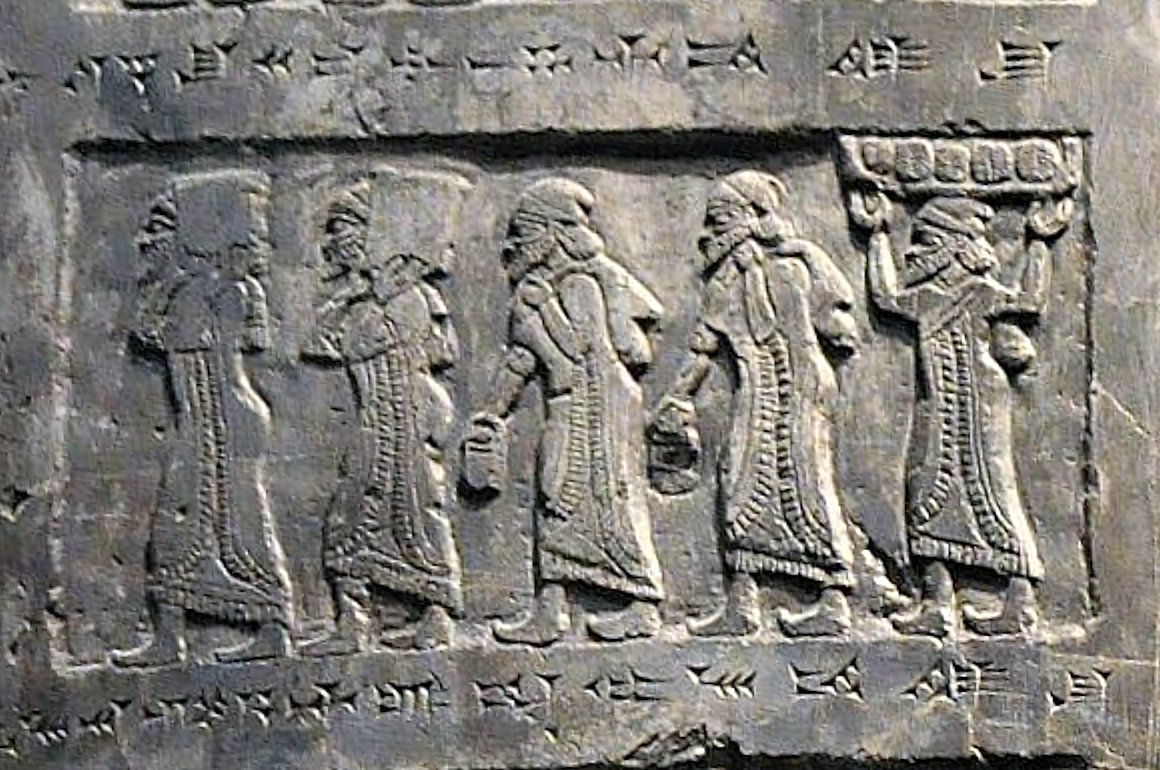
Delegation of the Northern Kingdom of Israel, bearing gifts to the Assyrian ruler Shalmaneser III, c. 840 BCE, on the Black Obelisk, British Museum

The scriptural basis for the idea of lost tribes is 2 Kings 17:6: "In the ninth year of Hoshea, the king of Assyria took Samaria, and carried Israel away unto Assyria, and placed them in Halah, and in Habor, on the river of Gozan, and in the cities of the Medes."

According to the Bible, the Kingdoms of Israel and Judah were the successor states to the older United Monarchy of Israel. The Kingdom of Israel came into existence c. 930 BCE after the northern tribes of Israel rejected Solomon's son Rehoboam as their king. Ten tribes formed the Kingdom of Israel: The bible does mention that the Kingdom of Judah consisted of the tribes of Judah and Benjamin. The bible does not specifically name the ten tribes but there are commentaries that say that they consisted of the tribes of Reuben, Issachar, Zebulun, Dan, Naphtali, Gad, Asher, Ephraim, Simeon and Manasseh. However it is not clear how Simeon, whose territory was within the Judean territory, could ever have been a part of the northern kingdom. Additionally the territory of Asher was basically Phoenician, and that of Reuben was mostly overlapping with Moabite territory.

Members of the Tribe of Levi were located in cities in both kingdoms. According to 2 Chronicles 15:9, members of the tribes of Ephraim, Manasseh, and Simeon fled to Judah during the reign of Asa of Judah (c. 911–870 BCE).

In c. 732 BCE, the Assyrian king Tiglath-Pileser III captured Damascus and conquered and annexed Aram-Damascus, as well as the northern part of the Kingdom of Israel, while leaving a reduced Israelite kingdom centered on Samaria.

Israel Finkelstein estimated that only a fifth of the population (about 40,000) were actually resettled out of the area during the two deportation periods under Tiglath-Pileser III, Shalmaneser V, and Sargon II. Many also fled south to Jerusalem, which appears to have expanded in size fivefold during this period, requiring a new wall to be built, and a new source of water (Siloam) to be provided by King Hezekiah. Furthermore, 2 Chronicles 30:1–11 explicitly mentions northern Israelites who had been spared by the Assyrians—in particular, members of Dan, Ephraim, Manasseh, Asher, and Zebulun—and how members of the latter three returned to worship at the Temple in Jerusalem at that time.

The New Testament identifies Anna the Prophetess, who appears in the account of the Presentation of Jesus at the Temple, as being "of the tribe of Asher."

=== Biblical apocrypha ===
According to historian Zvi Ben-Dor Benite:

Centuries after their disappearance, the ten lost tribes sent an indirect but vital sign ... In 2 Esdras, we read about the ten tribes and "their long journey through that region, which is called Arzareth" ... The book of the "Vision of Ezra", or Esdras, was written in Hebrew or Aramaic by a Jew in Israel sometime before the end of the first century CE, shortly after the destruction of the temple by the Romans [in 70 CE]. It is one of a group of texts later designated as the so-called Apocrypha—pseudoepigraphal books – attached to but not included in the Hebrew biblical canon.

In Second [also called Fourth] Esdras, 13:39–47:

^{39}And as for your seeing him [a man seen in a vision] gather to himself another multitude that was peaceable, ^{40}these are the ten tribes which were led away from their own land into captivity in the days of King Hoshea, whom Shalmaneser, the king of the Assyrians, led captive; he took them across the river, and they were taken to another land. ^{41}But they formed this plan for themselves, that they would leave the multitude of the nations and go to a more distant region, where mankind had never lived, ^{42}that there at least they might keep their statutes which they had not kept in their own land. ^{43}And they went in by the narrow passages of the Euphrates river. ^{44}For at that time the Most High performed signs for them, and stopped the channels of the river until they had passed over. ^{45}Through that region there was a long way to go, a journey of a year and a half; and that country is called Arzareth. ^{46}Then they dwelt there until the last times; and now, when they are about to come again, ^{47}the Most High will stop the channels of the river again, so that they may be able to pass over.

In Second Baruch, also called the Syriac Apocalypse of Baruch, 77:17–78:4:

^{77:17}But, as you asked me, I will write a letter to your brothers in Babylon, and I will send it by the hands of men; and I will write also a similar letter to the nine and a half tribes, and send it by means of a bird. ^{18}And on the twenty-first day of the eighth month, I, Baruch, came and sat down under the oak in the shade of its branches, and no one was with me – I was alone. ^{19}And I wrote two letters: one I sent by eagle to the nine and a half tribes; and the other I sent to those that were in Babylon by the hands of three men. ^{20}And I called the eagle and said to it, ^{21}"The Most High created you to be the king of all the birds. ^{22}Go now: stop nowhere on your journey: neither look for any roosting place, not settle on any tree, till you have crossed the broad waters of the river Euphrates, ands come to the people who dwell there, and laid this letter at their feet." [....] ^{78:1}This is the letter that Baruch, the son of Neriah, sent to the nine and a half tribes, which were across the river Euphrates, in which these things were written. ^{2}"Baruch, the son of Neriah, to his brothers in captivity, Mercy and peace to you. ^{3}I can never forget, my brothers, the love of him who created us, who loved us from the beginning and never hated us, but rather subjected us to discipline. ^{4}Nor can I forget that all we of the twelve tribes are united by a common bond, inasmuch as we are descended from a single father. [....]"

== Views ==
=== Judaism ===
The Talmud debates whether or not the ten lost tribes will eventually be reunited with the Tribe of Judah; that is, with the Jewish people:

The ten tribes will not eventually return, as is said: "He sent them to another land as it is this day" (Deuteronomy 29:27), just as the day departs and does not return, similarly they depart and do not return – according to Rabbi Akiva. Rabbi Eliezer says: "as it is this day" – just as this day grows dark and then bright again, so too the ten tribes who have been darkened will eventually be brightened [i.e. they will return]. ... Rabbi Shimon ben Yehuda of the village of Akko says in the name of Rabbi Shimon: If their deeds remain "as this day" [i.e. they continue to sin], they will not return; otherwise they shall return.

An Ashkenazi Jewish legend speaks of these tribes as Die Roite Yiddelech, "the red Jews", who were cut off from the rest of Jewry by the legendary river Sambation, "whose foaming waters raise high up into the sky a wall of fire and smoke that is impossible to pass through."

=== Christianity ===
To varying degrees, Apocryphal accounts concerning the Lost Tribes, based on biblical accounts, have been produced by Jews and Christians since at least the 17th century. An increased currency of tales relating to lost tribes that occurred in the 17th century was due to the confluence of several factors. According to Tudor Parfitt:

As Michael Pollack shows, Menasseh's argument was based on "three separate and seemingly unrelated sources: a verse from the book of Isaiah, Matteo Ricci's discovery of an old Jewish community in the heart of China and Antonio Montezinos' reported encounter with members of the Lost Tribes in the wilds of South America".

In 1649, Menasseh ben Israel published his book, The Hope of Israel, in Spanish and Latin in Amsterdam; it included Antonio de Montezinos' account of the Lost Tribes in the New World. An English translation was published in London in 1650. In it, Menasseh argued that the native inhabitants of America which were encountered at the time of the European discovery were actually the descendants of the [lost] Ten Tribes of Israel and for the first time, he tried to gain support for the theory from European thinkers and publishers. Menasseh noted how important Montezinos' account was,

for the Scriptures do not tell what people first inhabited those Countries; neither was there mention of them by any, til Christop. Columbus, Americus, Vespacius [sic], Ferdinandus, Cortez [sic], the Marquesse Del Valle [sic], and Franciscus Pizarrus [sic] went thither ...

He wrote on 23 December 1649: "I think that the Ten Tribes live not only there ... but also in other lands scattered everywhere; these never did come back to the Second Temple and they keep till this day still the Jewish Religion ..."

==== Latter-day Saint Movement ====
According to the Book of Mormon, two families of Nephites escaped from Israel circa 600 BC shortly before the sacking of Jerusalem by Nebuchadnezzar, constructed a ship, sailed across the ocean, and arrived in the Americas in the Pre-Columbian era. These Nephites are among the ancestors of Native American tribes and possibly also the Polynesians. Adherents believe the two founding tribes were called Nephites and Lamanites, that the Nephites obeyed the Law of Moses, practiced Christianity, and that the Lamanites were rebellious. The Book of Mormon claims that the Nephites and Lamanites were who Jesus Christ was referring to when he taught, "And other sheep I have, which are not of this fold: them also I must bring, and they shall hear my voice; and there shall be one fold, and one shepherd." Eventually the Lamanites wiped out the Nephites around 400 CE, and they are among the ancestors of Native Americans. The Book of Mormon claims that other groups of Israelites, besides the Nephites, were led away by God from the time of the Exodus through the reign of King Zedekiah, and that Jesus Christ also visited them after His resurrection. Some Latter-day Saints believe the ancient accounts of Quetzalcoatl and Shangdi, among others, support this doctrine.

The Church of Jesus Christ of Latter-day Saints (LDS Church) believes in the literal gathering of Israel, and as of 2006 the Church actively preached the gathering of people from the twelve tribes. "Today Israelites are found in all countries of the world. Many of these people do not know that they are descended from the ancient house of Israel," the church teaches in its basic Gospel Principles manual. "The Lord promised that His covenant people would someday be gathered ... God gathers His children through missionary work. As people come to a knowledge of Jesus Christ, receiving the ordinances of salvation and keeping the associated covenants, they become 'the children of the covenant' (3 Nephi 20:26)."

The church also teaches that

The power and authority to direct the work of gathering the house of Israel was given to Joseph Smith by the prophet Moses, who appeared in 1836 in the Kirtland Temple. ... The Israelites are to be gathered spiritually first and then physically. They are gathered spiritually as they join The Church of Jesus Christ of Latter-day Saints and make and keep sacred covenants. ... The physical gathering of Israel means that the covenant people will be 'gathered home to the lands of their inheritance, and shall be established in all their lands of promise' (2 Nephi 9:2). The tribes of Ephraim and Manasseh will be gathered in the Americas. The tribe of Judah will return to the city of Jerusalem and the area surrounding it. The ten lost tribes will receive from the tribe of Ephraim their promised blessings (see D&C 133:26–34). ... The physical gathering of Israel will not be complete until the Second Coming of the Savior and on into the Millennium (see Joseph Smith—Matthew 1:37).

The tenth Article of Faith, written by Joseph Smith, states: "We believe in the literal gathering of Israel and in the restoration of the Ten Tribes; that Zion (the New Jerusalem) will be built upon the American continent; that Christ will reign personally upon the earth; and, that the earth will be renewed and receive its paradisiacal glory." (LDS Articles of Faith #10)

In Ezekiel 37 15-19 he is told to take two sticks, one for Judah and one for Ephraim (or Joseph), and join the two sticks together. The church teaches that the Book of Mormon is the stick of Ephraim (or Joseph) mentioned and that the Bible is the stick of Judah, thus comprising two witnesses for Jesus Christ. The church considers the Book of Mormon one of the main tools for the spiritual gathering of Israel.

=== Historical view ===
The Samaritans constitute a distinct surviving tradition of ancient Israel, with their own Torah, holy mountain at Mount Gerizim, priesthood, ancestry traditions, and claims to the twelve tribes.

It has been proposed that some Israelites joined the southern tribes in the Kingdom of Judah; however, this theory is debated. The Israelites who were deported are thought to have assimilated with the local populace.

For instance, the New Standard Jewish Encyclopedia states: "In historic fact, some members of the Ten Tribes remained in the land of Israel, where apart from the Samaritans some of their descendants long preserved their identity among the Jewish population, others were assimilated, while others were presumably absorbed by the last Judean exiles who in 597–586 BCE were deported to Assyria ... Unlike the Judeans of the southern Kingdom, who survived a similar fate 135 years later, they soon assimilated".

== Search ==
The enduring mysteries which surround the disappearance of the tribes later became sources of numerous (largely mythological) narratives in recent centuries, with historian Tudor Parfitt arguing that "this myth is a vital feature of colonial discourse throughout the long period of European overseas empires, from the beginning of the fifteenth century, until the later half of the twentieth". Along with Prester John, they formed an imaginary guide for exploration and contact with uncontacted and indigenous peoples in the Age of Discovery and colonialism.

However, during his other research projects, Parfitt discovered the possible existence of some ethnic links between several older Jewish Diaspora communities in Asia, Africa and the Middle East, especially in those Jewish communities which were established in pre-colonial times. For example, in his Y-DNA studies of males from the Lemba people of Southern Africa, Parfitt found a high proportion of paternal Semitic ancestry, DNA that is common to both Arabs and Jews from the Middle East.

During his later genetic studies of the Bene Israel of India, the origins of whom were obscure, he also concluded that they were predominantly descended from males from the Middle East, a conclusion which was largely consistent with their oral histories of their origin. These findings subsequently led other Judaising groups, including the Gogodala tribe of Papua New Guinea, to seek help in determining their own origins.

== Ethnology and anthropology ==
Expanded exploration and study of groups throughout the world through archaeology and the new field of anthropology in the late 19th century led to a revival or a reworking of accounts of the Lost Tribes. For instance, because the construction of the Mississippian culture's complex earthwork mounds seemed to be beyond the skills of the Native American cultures which European Americans knew about when they discovered them, it was theorized that the ancient civilizations which were involved in the construction of the mounds were linked to the Lost Tribes. The discoverers of the mounds tried to fit the new information which they acquired as the result of their archaeological findings into a biblical construct. However, the earthworks across North America have been conclusively linked to various Native groups, and today, archaeologists consider the theory of non-Native origin pseudo-scientific.

== Groups which claim descent from the Lost Tribes ==
=== Samaritans ===
Samaritans consider themselves to be descended from tribes of Ephraim and Manasseh who stayed in their land and kept their religion. The Jewish belief is that Samaritans are descended from foreigners who replaced the exiled northern tribes and took on the customs of natives.

=== Kurdish Jews ===
Many travelers and researchers have reported that the traditional folklore of Kurdish Jews claims they are descended from the Ten Lost Tribes. According to the memoirs of Benjamin of Tudela and Pethahiah of Regensburg, there were about 100 Jewish settlements and substantial Jewish population in Kurdistan in the 12th century. Benjamin of Tudela also gives the account of David Alroi, the messianic leader from central Kurdistan, who rebelled against the Seljuk Sultan Muktafi and had plans to lead the Jews back to Jerusalem.

=== Pashtuns of Afghanistan and Pakistan ===
Among the Pashtuns, there is a tradition of being descended from the exiled lost tribes of Israel. This tradition was referenced in 19th century western scholarship and it was also incorporated in the "Lost Tribes" literature which was popular at that time (notably George Moore's The Lost Tribes of 1861). Recently (2000s), interest in the topic has been revived by the Jerusalem-based anthropologist Shalva Weil, who was quoted in the popular press as stating that the "Taliban may be descended from Jews".

The traditions surrounding the Pashtuns being the remote descendants of the "Lost Tribes of Israel" are to be distinguished from the historical existence of the Jewish community in eastern Afghanistan or northwest Pakistan which flourished from about the 7th century to the early 20th century, but has essentially disappeared from the region due to emigration to Israel since the 1950s.

==== Mughal-era historiography ====
The theory of Pashtun descent from Israelites appears in Makhzan-e-Afghani, a history book which was compiled by Niamat Ullah Harvi, a scholar at the court of the Mughal Emperor Jahangir in the 17th century.

==== Modern findings ====
The Pashtuns are a predominantly Sunni Muslim Iranic people, native to southern Afghanistan and northwestern Pakistan, who adhere to an indigenous and pre-Islamic religious code of honor and culture, Pashtunwali. The belief that the Pashtuns are descended from the lost tribes of Israel has never been substantiated by concrete historical evidence. Many members of the Taliban hail from the Pashtun tribes and they do not necessarily disclaim their alleged Israelite descent.

In Pashto, the tribal name 'Yusef Zai' means the "sons of Joseph".

A number of genetic studies on Jews refute the possibility of a connection, whereas others maintain a link. In 2010, The Guardian reported that the Israeli government was planning to fund a genetic study to test the veracity of a genetic link between the Pashtuns and the lost tribes of Israel. The article stated that "Historical and anecdotal evidence strongly suggests a connection, but definitive scientific proof has never been found. Some leading Israeli anthropologists believe that, of all the many groups in the world which claim to have a connection to the 10 lost tribes, the Pashtuns, or Pathans, have the most compelling case."

=== Assyrian Jews ===
Some traditions of the Assyrian Jews claim that Israelites of the tribe of Benjamin first arrived in the area of modern Kurdistan after the Neo-Assyrian Empire's conquest of the Kingdom of Israel during the 8th century BCE; they were subsequently relocated to the Assyrian capital. During the first century BCE, the Assyrian royal house of Adiabene—which, according to the Jewish historian Flavius Josephus, was ethnically Assyrian and whose capital was Erbil (Aramaic: Arbala; Kurdish: Hewlêr)—was converted to Judaism. King Monobazes, his queen Helena, and his son and successor Izates are recorded as the first proselytes.

=== Claims from India ===
==== Bnei Israel ====
The Bene Israel are a community of Jews in the Indian state of Maharashtra, residing particularly in the Konkan region. Since the formation of the State of Israel, thousands of Bene Israelis have made aliyah, although large numbers still remain in India.

==== Bnei Menashe ====
Since the late 20th century, some tribes in the Indian North-Eastern states of Mizoram and Manipur have been claiming that they are Lost Israelites and they have also been studying Hebrew and Judaism. In 2005, the chief rabbi of Israel ruled that the Bnei Menashe are descended from a lost tribe. Based on the ruling, Bnei Menashe are allowed to immigrate to Israel after they formally convert to Judaism. In 2021, 4,500 Bnei Menashe had made aliyah to Israel; 6,000 Bnei Menashe in India hope to make aliyah.

==== Kashmiri Jews ====
According to Al-Biruni, the famous 11th-century Persian Muslim scholar: "In former times the inhabitants of Kashmir used to allow one or two foreigners to enter their country, particularly Jews, but at present they do not allow any Hindus whom they do not know personally to enter, much less other people."

François Bernier, a 17th-century French physician and Sir Francis Younghusband, who explored this region in the 1800s, commented on the similar physiognomy between Kashmiris and Jews, including "fair skin, prominent noses", and similar head shapes.

Baikunth Nath Sharga argues that, despite the etymological similarities between Kashmiri and Jewish surnames, the Kashmiri Pandits are of Indo-Aryan descent while the Jews are of Semitic descent.

==== Bene Ephraim ====
The Bene Ephraim, also called Telugu Jews, claim descent from the tribe of Ephraim. Since the 1980s, they have learned to practice modern Judaism. They say that they traveled from Israel through western Asia: Persia, Afghanistan, Tibet and into China for 1,600 years before arriving in southern India more than 1,000 years ago. They hold a history which they say is similar to that of the shift of Afghan Jews, Persian Jews, Bene Israel, and Bnei Menashe. The community has been visited over the years by rabbis from the chief rabbinate in Israel to study their Jewish tradition and practices. They have sought recognition from many rabbis around the world, and they always practiced their own oral traditions and customs (caviloth), such as: burying the dead; marrying under a chuppah; observing Shabbat and other Jewish festivals, and maintaining a beit din. However, they adopted some aspects of Christianity after the arrival of British Baptist missionaries during the early 19th century although nominally practicing Judaism. Because of the long period in which the people were not practicing Judaism, they did not develop any distinctly identifiable Judæo-Telugu language as other groups did.

=== Beta Israel of Ethiopia ===
The Beta Israel ("House of Israel") are Ethiopian Jews, who were also called "Falashas" in the past. Some members of the Beta Israel, as well as several Jewish scholars, believe that they are descended from the lost Tribe of Dan, as opposed to the traditional account of their origins which claims that they are descended from the Queen of Sheba and the Israelite king Solomon. They have a tradition of being connected to Jerusalem. Early DNA studies showed that they were descended from Ethiopians, but in the 21st century, new studies have shown their possible descent from a few Jews who lived in either the 4th or 5th century CE, possibly in Sudan. The Beta Israel made contact with other Jewish communities in the later 20th century. In 1973 Rabbi Ovadia Yosef, then the Chief Sephardic Rabbi, based on the Radbaz and other accounts, ruled that the Beta Israel were Jews and should be brought to Israel; two years later that opinion was confirmed by a number of other authorities who made similar rulings, including the Chief Ashkenazi Rabbi Shlomo Goren.

=== Igbo Jews ===
The Igbo Jews of Nigeria variously claim descent from the tribes of Ephraim, Naphtali, Menasseh, Levi, Zebulun and Gad. The theory, however, does not hold up to historical scrutiny. Historians have examined the historical literature on West Africa from the colonial era and they have elucidated that such theories served diverse functions for the writers who proposed them.

=== Black Hebrew Israelites ===
The Black Hebrew Israelites are an African American new religious movement which claims that African Americans are the descendants of the Ten Lost Tribes. The group believe that, following their displacement, the Ten Lost Tribes migrated to and settled in West Africa and they were subsequently enslaved and transported to America in the Transatlantic slave trade; where their white slave masters forced them to abandon their Jewish culture and adopt Christianity. The Black Hebrew Israelites also believe that European Jews are not descended from the original Israelites, instead, Black Hebrew Israelites believe that European Jews are "impostors". For this reason, the group is frequently considered antisemitic. They are not recognized as Jews by any major Jewish organization and they are also not recognized by the modern State of Israel.

=== Gogodala people ===
Some Gogodala people of Papua New Guinea claim to be one of the lost tribes, adopting some Jewish customs to reflect this.

== Speculation regarding other ethnic groups ==
There has been speculation regarding various ethnic groups, which would be regarded as fringe theories.

=== Japanese people ===
Some writers have speculated that the Japanese people may be the direct descendants of some of the Ten Lost Tribes. Parfitt writes that "the spread of the fantasy of Israelite origin ... forms a consistent feature of the Western colonial enterprise. ... It is in fact in Japan that we can trace the most remarkable evolution in the Pacific of an imagined Judaic past. As elsewhere in the world, the theory that aspects of the country were to be explained via an Israelite model was introduced by Western agents."

In 1878, Scottish immigrant to Japan Nicholas McLeod self-published Epitome of the Ancient History of Japan. McLeod drew correlations between his observations of Japan and the fulfillment of biblical prophecy: The civilized race of the Ainus,^{[sic: read Ainus]} the Tokugawa and the Machi No Hito of the large towns, by dwelling in the tent or tabernacle shaped houses first erected by Jin Mu Tenno, have fulfilled Noah's prophecy regarding Japheth, "He shall dwell in the tents of Shem."

Jon Entine emphasizes the fact that DNA evidence shows that there are no genetic links between Japanese and Israelite people.

=== Lemba people ===
The Lemba people (Vhalemba) of Southern Africa claim to be the descendants of several Jewish men who traveled from what is now Yemen to Africa in search of gold, where they took wives and established new communities. They specifically adhere to religious practices which are similar to those which exist in Judaism and they also have a tradition of being a migrant people, with clues which point to their origin in either West Asia or North Africa. According to the oral history of the Lemba, their ancestors were Jews who came from a place called Sena several hundred years ago and settled in East Africa. Sena is an abandoned ancient town in Yemen, located in the eastern Hadramaut valley, which history indicates was inhabited by Jews in past centuries. Some research suggests that "Sena" may refer to Wadi Masilah (near Sayhut) in Yemen, often called Sena, or alternatively to the city of Sana'a, which is also located in Yemen.

DNA tests have not supported their claims of a Jewish heritage.

=== Māori ===
Some early Christian missionaries to New Zealand speculated that the native Māori were descendants of the Lost Tribes. Some Māori later embraced this belief.

=== Native Americans ===
In 1650, an English minister named Thomas Thorowgood, who was a preacher in Norfolk, published a book entitled Jewes in America or Probabilities that the Americans are of that Race, which he had prepared for the New England missionary society. Parfitt writes of this work: "The society was active in trying to convert the Indians but suspected that they might be Jews and realized that it had better be prepared for an arduous task. Thorowgood's tract argued that the native populations of North America were descendants of the Ten Lost Tribes."

In 1652 Hamon L'Estrange, an English author who wrote literary works about topics such as history and theology published an exegetical tract called Americans no Jews, or improbabilities that the Americans are of that Race in response to the tract by Thorowgood. In response to L'Estrange, in 1660, Thorowgood published a second edition of his book with a revised title and a foreword which was written by John Eliot, a Puritan missionary to the Indians who had translated the Bible into an Indian language.

The American diplomat and journalist Mordecai Manuel Noah also proposed the idea that the indigenous peoples of the Americas are descended from the Israelites in his publication The American Indians Being the Descendants of the Lost Tribes of Israel (1837).

That some or all American Indians are part of the lost tribes is suggested by the Book of Mormon (1830) and it is also a popular belief among Latter-day Saints.

=== Neuri ===
The Swedish historian of the 18th century Olof von Dalin suggested that the Scythian tribe Neuri mentioned by Greek authors were descendants of the ten lost tribes of Israel; at the same time, he considered the Neuri to be the ancestors of the Finns, the Sami, and the Estonians.

=== Scythian/Cimmerian theories and British Israelism ===
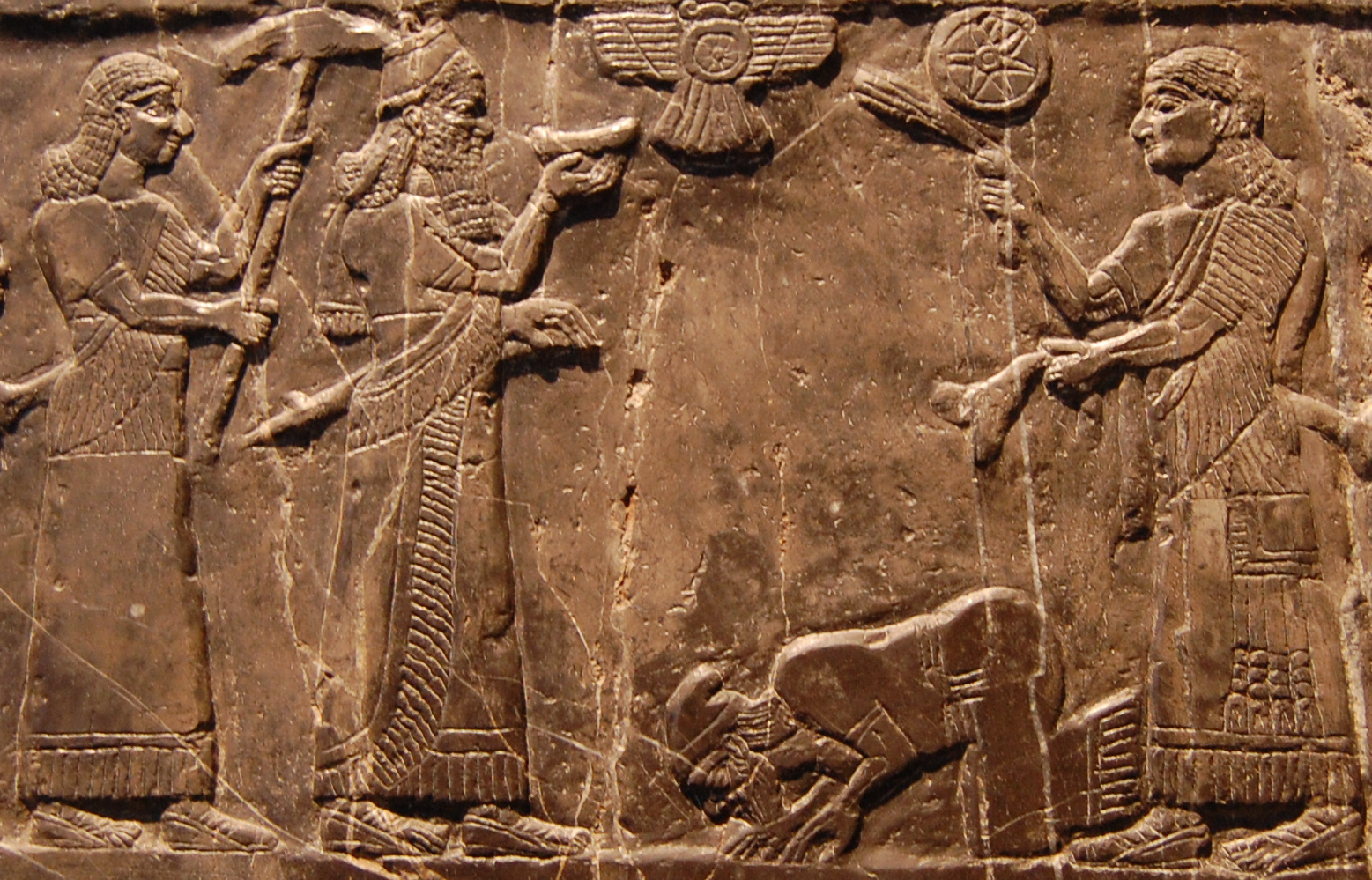
A depiction of either King Jehu, or Jehu's ambassador, kneeling at the feet of Shalmaneser III on the Black Obelisk

Adherents of British Israelism and Christian Identity both believe that the lost tribes migrated northward, over the Caucasus, and became the Scythians, Cimmerians and Goths, as well as the progenitors of the later Germanic invaders of Britain.

The theory first arose in England and then it spread to the United States. During the 20th century, British Israelism was promoted by Herbert W. Armstrong, founder of the Worldwide Church of God.

Tudor Parfitt, author of The Lost Tribes: The History of a Myth, states that the proof which is cited by adherents of British Israelism is "of a feeble composition even by the low standards of the genre", and these notions are widely rejected by historians.

== In literature ==
In 1929 Yiddish-writing author Lazar Borodulin published one of the very few Yiddish science fiction novels, אויף יענער זייט סמבטיון : וויסענשאפטליכער און פאנטאסטישער ראמאן (Oyf yener zayt sambatyun, visnshaftlekher un fantastisher roman, in English: On the other side of the Sambation, a scientific and fantastic novel), a novel in the "lost world" genre, written in a Jewish perspective. In the novel a journalist meets a mad scientist with a ray gun in the land of the Red Jews.

In a 1934 adventure novel by Ben Aronin, The Lost Tribe. Being the Strange Adventures of Raphael Drale in Search of the Lost Tribes of Israel, a teenager, Raphael, finds the lost tribe of Dan beyond the Arctic Circle.

== See also ==
- Zera Yisrael, a legal category in Halakha that denotes those who are not legally Jewish, but have some kind of Jewish ancestry
- Genetic studies of Jews
- Groups claiming affiliation with Israelites
- Islamic–Jewish relations
- Jewish ethnic divisions
- Assyria and Germany in Anglo-Israelism
- Black Hebrew Israelites, an extremist group that states African-Americans and indigenous Americans are the descendants of the ancient Israelites
- British Israelism
- Christian Identity
- Christianity and Judaism
- Christian Zionism
- French Israelism
- Judaism and Mormonism
- Khazar hypothesis of Ashkenazi ancestry
- Mandaeans
- Native American people and Mormonism
- Nordic Israelism
- Pacific Islanders and Mormonism
- Shavei Israel, an organization which seeks to find "lost Jews".
- Theory of Kashmiri descent from lost tribes of Israel
- Joseph Wolff, Messianic Jewish missionary who travelled in search of the Lost Tribes
- Who is a Jew?
