= John Cox Gawler =

British Israelite author (1830–1882)

Col. John Cox Gawler (1830–1882) was a Keeper of the Jewel House and British Israelite author.

== Life ==
Gawler was the son of Lieutenant-Colonel George Gawler. Like his father he served in the military, he first joined the 73rd Regiment and fought in the 8th Xhosa War, 1850 to 1853, later being promoted to a colonel. In September, 1855, he was appointed a special magistrate in British Kaffraria. Later in 1861 he fought in Sikkim, India. In the 1870s Gawler became the Keeper of the Jewel House at the Tower of London, a position he held until his death in 1882. He wrote numerous works on war and British Israelism.

== Works ==
=== War ===
- The British line in the attack, past and future (1872)
- Sikkim, with hints on Mountain and Jungle Warfare (1873)

=== British Israelism ===
- Our Scythian Ancestors (1875)
- Dan, the pioneer of Israel (1880)
- The Two Olive Trees (1881)
