= Aleksei (convert) =

Russian archpriest and Jewish convert (1425–1488)

Aleksei (Russian: Алексей; c. 1425 – 1488) was a Russian archpriest who became known for converting to Judaism.

== Life ==
Aleksei was born probably in Novgorod around 1425.

Aleksei became a convert to Judaism in the last quarter of the fifteenth century during a schism within the Russian Orthodox Church under the influence of Skhariyah (Zechariah), of Kiev whose judaising idea spread among Orthodox believers Pskov and Novgorod. Skhariyah belonged to the suite of the Gediminid prince Michael Olelkovich, who came to Novgorod in 1471. The first convert in Novgorod was the priest Dionisy (Denis), who introduced to Skhariyah his colleague, the archpriest (protopop) Aleksei. The latter was the most zealous of the new converts, and did successful missionary work among all classes, especially among the clergy. The new community appreciated his labors so highly that the name of Abraham was conferred upon him, while his wife's name was changed to Sarah. The works of Joseph of Volokolamsk tells how the Jew "first of all seduced the priest Denis and converted him to Judaism; and Denis brought to him the archpriest Aleksey, and he also was an apostate from the unsillied, true and Christian faith".

When the grand prince of Moscow, Ivan III, visited Novgorod in 1480, Aleksei found favor in his eyes. The grand prince took Aleksei with him to Moscow and put him at the head of the Cathedral of the Dormition, while his friend Dionisy was at the same time appointed priest of the Archangel Cathedral in the same city. Aleksei enjoyed the confidence of the grand prince in a high degree and had free access to him. The court party of Sophia Paleologue alleged that he succeeded in converting his secretary, Fyodor Kuritsyn, the archimandrite Zosima, the monk Zechariah, Elena of Moldavia (wife of Ivan the Young), and many other prominent personages. The grand prince at first, probably for political reasons, protected the heretics, but later on was constrained to persecute them. This campaign resulted in Helena's son Dmitry being disinherited in favour of Sophia's son Vasily.

He died in Moscow in 1488.

== Resources ==
- Rosenthal, Herman, "Aleksei". Jewish Encyclopedia. Funk and Wagnalls, 1901–1906, citing:
  - Platon, Kratkaya Tserkovnaya Rossiskaya Istoriya, Moscow, 1833;
  - N. Rudnev, Rassuzhdenie o Yeresyakh i Raskolakh Byvshikh v Russkoi Tserkvi so Vremeni Vladimira Velikago do Ioanna Groznago (Treatise on the Sects and Schism in the Russian Church, from the time of Vladimir the Great to Ivan the Terrible), Moscow, 1838;
  - Karamzin, Istoriya Rossii, vi. 154;
  - Panov, Zhurnal Ministerstva Narodnago Prosvyeshcheniya, No. 159, p. 261.
