= Heresy of the Judaizers =

15th–16th-century religious sect in Russia

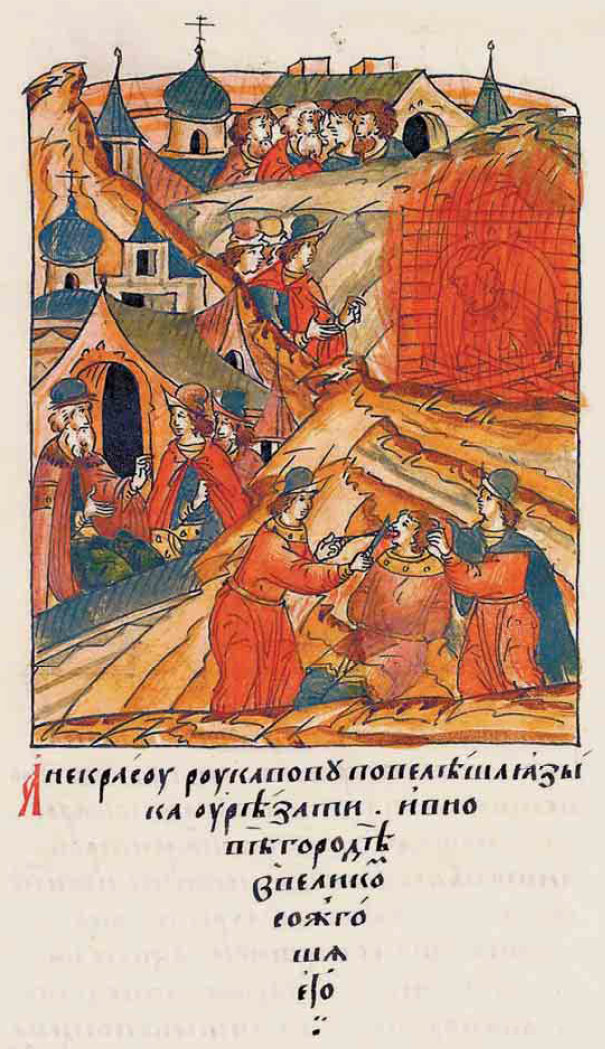
Execution of the Judaizers in 1504, miniature from the Illustrated Chronicle of Ivan the Terrible

The Heresy of the Judaizers (Russian: ересь жидовствующих, romanized: yeres zhidovstvuyushchikh) was a religious movement that emerged in Novgorod and later Moscow in the second half of the 15th century which marked the beginning of a new era of schism in Russia. Initially popular among high-ranking statesmen and even the royal court, the movement was persecuted by the hegumen Joseph Volotsky and the archbishop Gennady of Novgorod. Several councils of the Russian Orthodox Church later condemned the Judaizers as heretics.

Some scholars see them as a Russian variant of the pre-Reformation era. Any filiation with the strigolniki, who appeared in the 14th century, remains conjectural, but highlights the religious situation in Novgorod at the time.

== Terminology and beliefs ==
The term zhidovstvuyushchiye (Russian: жидовствующие), as it is known in the sources, is derived from the Russian word жид (zhid, from Judea, an older Russian term for Jew which is now considered pejorative). Zhidovstvuyuschiye may be loosely translated as "those who follow Jewish traditions" or "those who think like Jews". The hegumen Joseph Volotsky, the main critic and persecutor of this thought, considered the founder of this religious movement to be a certain Skhariya (also known as Zakhariya or Skara; Russian: Схария, Захария, Скара). This was Zacharia ben Aharon ha-Cohen, a scholar from Kiev brought to Novgorod by Mikhailo Olelkovich from the Grand Duchy of Lithuania in 1470. Zacharia translated a number of Hebrew texts on astronomy, logic and philosophy.

Their nickname arbitrarily presupposed their adherence to "Judaism", even though most of Skhariya's followers had been ordinary Russians of Russian Orthodox faith and low-ranking Orthodox clergy and had never confessed Judaism. Some scholars suggest that the pejorative label of "Judaizers" was given to scare off potential members. Almost all we know about their religious beliefs is found in accounts left by their accusers. This makes it rather difficult to determine the exact beliefs of the adherents, since the aim of the accusers was to blacken the name of the "sect" and crush it. According to most accounts though, the Belief of Skhariya renounced the Holy Trinity and the divine status of Jesus, monasticism, ecclesiastic hierarchy, ceremonies, and immortality of the soul. Some adherents also professed iconoclasm. The adherents also promoted the idea of "self-authority", or the self-determination of each individual in matters of faith and salvation. The priests Denis and Aleksei, who converted from Russian Orthodoxy to Judaism, were considered ideologists of this movement.

== History ==
In the late 15th century, the movement had spread to Moscow. In 1480, Ivan III himself invited a few prominent adherents to visit the city. The grand prince's behavior could be explained by the fact that he had sympathized with ideas of secularization and the struggle against feudal division. Thus, the heretics enjoyed the support of some high-ranking officials, statesmen, merchants, Yelena Stefanovna (wife of Ivan the Young, heir to the throne), and Ivan's favorite deacon and diplomat, Fyodor Kuritsyn. Many of the adherents of the movement had centred around Kuritsyn, who was the Russian diplomat to Hungary at the time. Kuritsyn also authored the Laodicean Epistle, which may have used some aspects of Jewish mysticism known as Kabbalah.

Despite the growing popularity of this religious movement in Novgorod and Moscow, Ivan III was wary of the fact that it could irreversibly infiltrate broader masses of ordinary people and deprive him of ecclesiastic support in his foreign policy. Indeed, a denial of the Trinity and the divinity of Christ would destroy Christianity, while the adherents' opposition to the clergy and the secular authorities would have undermined the entire society. This made Ivan III renounce his ideas of secularization and ally with the clergy.

=== Persecution ===
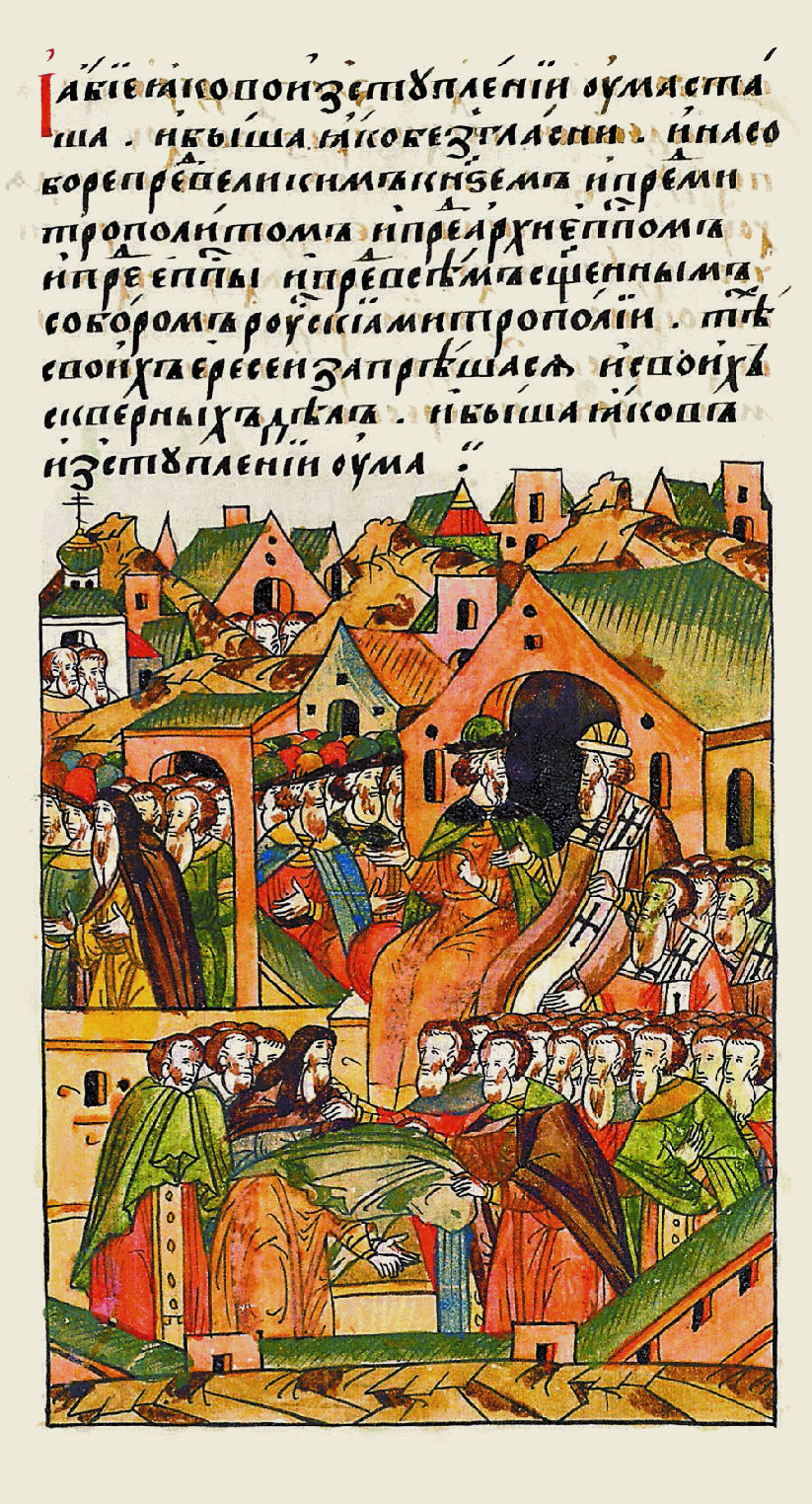
Sobor of 1490, miniature from the Illustrated Chronicle of Ivan the Terrible

The struggle against the adherents was led by hegumen Joseph Volotsky and his followers (Russian: иосифляне, romanized: iosiflyane, lit. 'Josephinians') and Archbishop Gennady of Novgorod. After uncovering adherents in Novgorod around 1487, Gennady wrote a series of letters to other churchmen over several years calling on them to convene a sobor (church council) with the aim "not to debate them, but to burn them". Such councils were held in 1488, 1490, 1494 and 1504. The councils outlawed religious and non-religious books and initiated their burning, sentenced a number of people to death, sent adherents into exile, and excommunicated them. In 1491, Skhariya was executed in Novgorod by the order of Ivan III. More adherents were executed with Gennady's approval, including the archimandrite Kassian of the Iuriev Monastery (who had allowed a number of adherents to hide there), Nekras Rukavov (they first tore out his tongue and then burnt him at the stake), a Pskovian monk Zakhar and others.

By the end of the 15th century, some of the adherents remained under the protection of Yelena Stefanovna and her son Dmitry, the grandson of Ivan III. However, in 1502 Dmitry was stripped of his title (transferred to Vasili III, the son of Ivan III and Sophia Paleologue). As soon as Ivan III died in 1505, Yelena and Dmitry were arrested and imprisoned, leaving the adherents vulnerable to attacks from the authorities. In 1504, diak (secretary) Ivan-Volk Kuritsyn, Dmitry Konoplev and Ivan Maksimov were burnt at the stake. Other adherents were banished, imprisoned, or excommunicated. Feodor Kuritsyn's adherents' club ceased to exist.

== 19th-century groups ==
In the early 19th century, a number of communities appeared in Tula, Voronezh and Tambov, which followed Jewish traditions and halacha. They were also called zhidovstvuyuschiye and were persecuted severely in the times of Nicholas I. Since the beginning of the 20th century, they have been also called iudeystvuyuschie, from iudeystvo, a neutral term for the Jewish religion. Now they are generally considered a part of Jewish people and some of them have immigrated to Israel. These groups, however, are not linked to the teaching of Skhariya.

== See also ==
- Jewish Christians
- Non-possessors
- Ewostatewos
- Subbotniks
- Szekler Sabbatarians

== Bibliography ==
- "Жидовствующие" . Brockhaus and Efron Encyclopedic Dictionary (in Russian). 1906.
- Langer, Lawrence N. (15 September 2021). Historical Dictionary of Medieval Russia. Rowman & Littlefield. pp. 93–95. ISBN 978-1-5381-1942-6.
- Vernadsky, George (1933). "The Heresy of the Judaizers and the Policies of Ivan III of Moscow". Speculum. 8 (4): 436–454. doi:10.2307/2855886. ISSN 0038-7134. JSTOR 2855886.
