= Russian Karaites =

Russian Karaites may refer to:

- Crimean Karaites in Russian Empire and modern Russia
- Subbotnik Jews, adherents of Karaite Judaism
