= Russian Karaite =

Russian Karaite may refer to:

- Karaite Subbotniks, also described as Russian Karaites, adherents of Karaite Judaism
- Crimean Karaites, adherents of Karaite Judaism in central and eastern Europe especially in the former Russian Empire
