= Lalchhanhima Sailo =

Lalchhanhima Sailo may refer to:

- Lalchhanhima Sailo (rabbi)
- Lalchhanhima Sailo (footballer)
