= Shavei =

Shavei, a Hebrew word meaning returnee, may refer to:

== Places ==
- Shavei Shomron
- Shavei Tzion

== Other uses ==
- Shavei Israel
