= Bnei Menashe =

Group of self-claimed Jews from northeast India

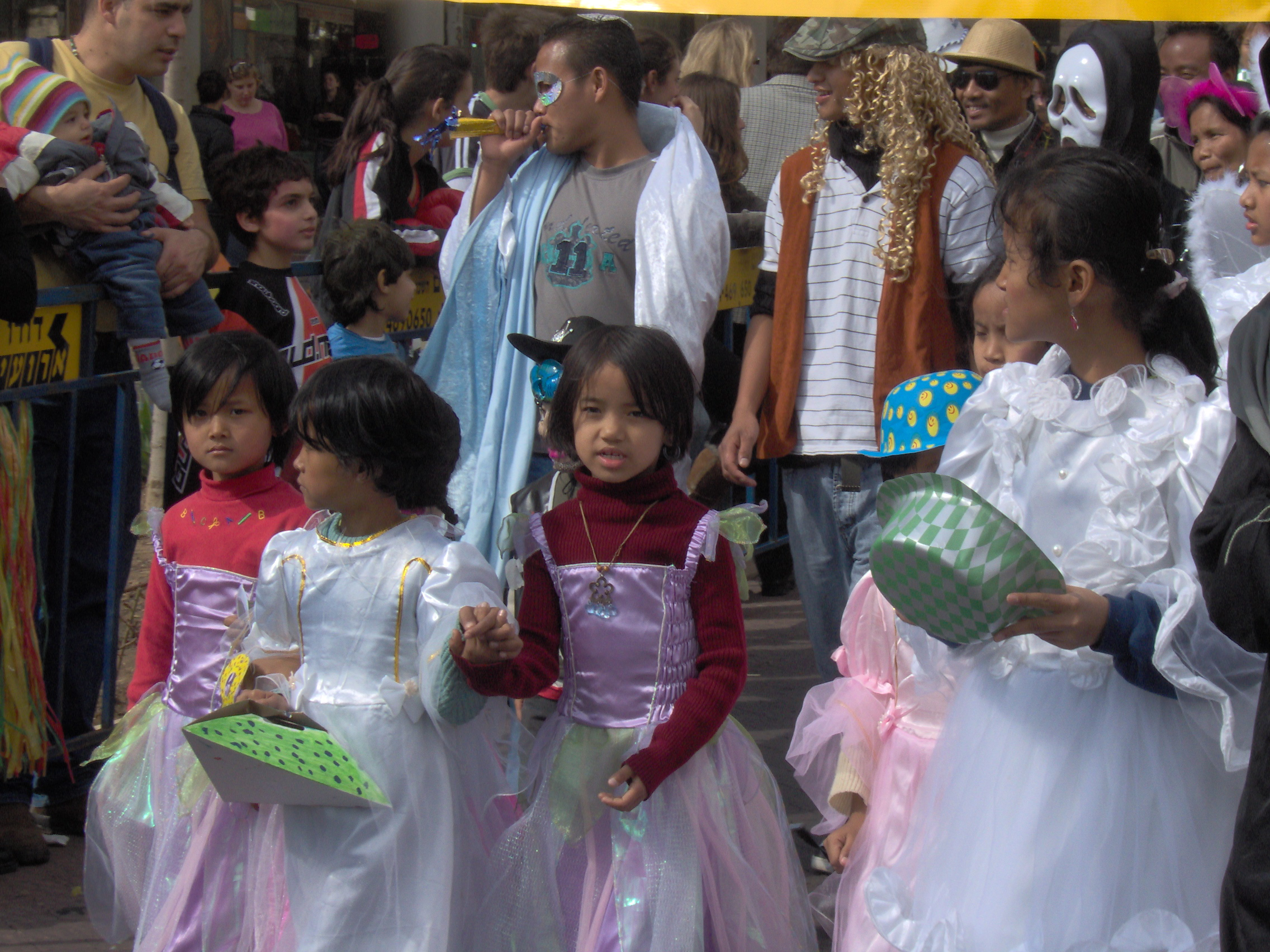
- Bnei Menashe in Adloyada of Purim in Karmiel

Total population
- 10,800

Regions with significant populations
- India: 5,800
- Israel: 5,000

Languages
- Various Kuki-Chin languages, Judeo-Zo, Hebrew

Religion
- Judaism

Related ethnic groups
- Other Zo peoples and Jews; Especially Hmars, Mizos, Thadou speakers, and Indian Jews

The Bnei Menashe (Hebrew: בני מנשה, lit. 'Children of Menasseh', known as the Shinlung in India) are a community of Indian Jews from various Tibeto-Burman speaking ethnic groups from the border of India, Bangladesh and Myanmar who claim descent from one of the Ten Lost Tribes, allegedly based on the Hmar belief in an ancestor named 'Manmasi'. Some of them have adopted Judaism. The community has around 10,000 members.

The movement began in 1951, when a tribal leader reported having a dream that his people's ancient homeland was Israel; some tribal members began embracing the idea that they were Jews. Before the movement's start, the community was largely a Christian one. Members are from the Chin, Kuki, and Mizo ethnic groups, amongst others.

In the late 20th century, the Israeli rabbi Eliyahu Avichail, of the group Amishav, named these people the "Bnei Menashe" based on their account of descent from Manasseh. In 2003–2004, DNA testing of several hundred male community members did not yield conclusive evidence of Middle Eastern ancestry. In 2005, a Kolkata-based study found evidence of maternally descended Near Eastern ancestry but suggested the findings were an artifact of thousands of years of intermarriage between peoples of the Near and Middle East.

Research from Mizoram University reveals that many customs, like ritual songs and animal sacrifices, which the Bnei Menashe point to as Jewish parallels through their oral history, were already present in the region, and to this day, there’s no written evidence suggesting a connection. Israel did not formally support immigration of the Bnei Menashe until 2005, when Shlomo Amar, then Sephardi Chief Rabbi of Israel, recognized the Bnei Menashe as a lost tribe. Bnei Menashe must obtain special dispensation from the Knesset to make aliyah.

== History ==
=== Biblical background ===
In the time of the First Temple, Israel was divided into two kingdoms. The southern one, known as the Kingdom of Judah, was made up mostly of the tribes of Judah, Benjamin, Simon and Levi. Most Jews today are descended from the southern kingdom. The northern Kingdom of Israel was made up of the other ten tribes (which include half of Levi). In approximately 721 BCE, the Assyrians invaded the northern kingdom, exiled the leading ~20% of the ten tribes living there, and took them to Assyria (present-day Iraq).

=== Adoption of modern Judaism ===
According to Lal Dena, the Bnei Menashe have come to believe that the legendary Hmar ancestor Manmasi was the Hebrew Menasseh, son of Joseph. During the 1950s, this group of Chin-Kuki-Mizo people founded a Messianic movement. In 1951, Challianthanga (Challa), a leader in the United Pentecostal Church in Mizoram, had a vision claiming the Mizo people were descendants of the Israelites.

David Siama Hmar, a native of Vairengte near the Mizoram–Manipur border, was among those influenced by Challa’s early spiritual movement. In 1953, while residing in Thringmun, he reportedly experienced a vision of a stone inscribed with the words “Rock of Israel” descending from the sky toward Manipur. In contrast to Challa, who did not fully embrace Judaism, Siama adopted it in its entirety, becoming one of the earliest known adherents in Mizoram. Challa died in 1959, prior to the formal introduction of Judaism to the Mizo community.

While they believed that Jesus is the promised messiah for all Israelites, these pioneers also adopted the observance of the Jewish Sabbath, the celebration of holidays, the observance of dietary laws and other Jewish customs and traditions which they learned from books in the early 1960s. They had no connections with other Jewish groups in either the diaspora or Israel.

Significant pioneering research into the Judaic identity of the Manmasi people was undertaken by Thangkholun Daniel Lhungdim—a poet, educator, and headmaster based in Churachandpur. Demonstrating deep commitment to this cause, he embraced Judaism and authored the seminal work Israel Ihiuve (“We Are Israel”) in 1974. Lhungdim collaborated closely with Samuel Sumkhothang Haokip and Yosef Jangkhothang Lhanghal, both of whom were early advocates of the Judaic revival in Northeast India.

Lhungdim’s views were met with strong opposition at the local level. In 1968, he was compelled to resign from his post and leave his village. He found refuge with Chief David Jamkhosem Lhungdim of Gelmuol, who supported his research efforts and sponsored his journeys to Calcutta and Bombay in 1969 and 1973.

In a 2001 publication, Holkholun Lhungdim reflected on the early skepticism surrounding the theory that the Manmasi were descendants of a Lost Tribe of Israel. He critiqued both proponents and opponents of the theory for their biased interpretations and called for objective, scholarly investigation. Notably, he had himself been a skeptic in 1974, attributing his doubts at the time to a lack of sufficient knowledge rather than to religious motivations.

On May 31, 1972, a group based in Churachandpur founded the Manipur Israel Family Association—the first organization representing the emerging Bnei Menashe community. In 1973, Daniel Lhungdim and Israel Ginjamung Suantak visited Calcutta and subsequently Bombay, where Lhungdim met Esther David Immanuel, the first known external Jewish supporter of the Bnei Menashe. He returned with three pivotal messages: (1) Judaism is the religion of the Jewish people; (2) circumcision is a religious obligation; and (3) Jews do not recognize Jesus as the Messiah.

These doctrinal assertions generated internal tensions within the Manipur Jewish Organization (MJO), ultimately leading to the formation of the United Jews of North East India (UJNEI) on October 10, 1974. This new organization aimed to unify the communities that had begun practicing Judaism in earnest. A defining moment occurred in February 1976 when Lhungdim was again dispatched to Bombay by UJNEI, marking his final research trip. His return on April 21, 1976, during Chol HaMoed Pesach, symbolized the spiritual rebirth of Judaism among the Manmasi. Reinvigorated by the formal instruction he had received, Lhungdim brought back a Sefer Torah, tefillin, tzitzit, and halachic literature. For the first time, the community began to observe Judaism in accordance with Jewish law, although formal conversion (giyur) had yet to be undertaken.

After these people established contacts with other Jewish religious groups in Israel and other countries, they began to practice more traditional rabbinic Judaism in the 1980s and 1990s. In 1978, UJNEI's outreach to Jewish organizations worldwide eventually drew the attention of Rabbi Eliyahu Avichail, founder of Amishav, an organization which is dedicated to finding the Lost Tribes and facilitating their aliyah. He investigated this group's claims of Jewish descent in the 1980s and named the group the Bnei Menashe.

Avichail proposed sending a young representative to Israel for formal religious training. In 1979, Gideon Rei (also known as Vankhuma Chongthu) and Simon Gin Vaiphei were selected for this mission. They departed India in January 1981 and enrolled at Machon Meir Yeshiva in Jerusalem, where they received instruction in Hebrew and foundational Jewish law. In 2005, the Chief Rabbinate of Israel ruled that the Bnei Menashe would be accepted as Jews, based on the devotion displayed by their practice through the decades, but still required individuals to undergo formal ritual conversion.

=== History of the Chin-Kuki-Mizo people ===
Prior to their conversion to Christianity in the 19th century, the Chin-Kuki-Mizo people practiced animism; ritual headhunting of enemies was part of their culture. Depending upon their affiliations, each tribe identifies primarily as Kuki, Mizo/Hmar, or Chin. The people identify most closely with their subtribes in the villages, each of which has its own distinct dialect and identity.

They are indigenous peoples who had migrated in waves from East Asia and settled in what is now northeastern India. They have no written history, but their legends refer to a beloved homeland that they had to leave, called Sinlung/Chinlung. The tribes speak languages that are branches of indigenous Tibeto-Burman.

=== Influence of revivalism ===
During the first Welsh missionary-led Christian Revivalism movement, which swept through the Mizo hills in 1906, the missionaries prohibited indigenous festivals, feasts, and traditional songs and chants. After missionaries abandoned this policy during the 1919–24 Revival, the Mizo began writing their own hymns, incorporating indigenous elements. They created a unique form of syncretic Christian worship. Christianity has generally been characterized by such absorption of elements of local cultures wherever it has been introduced.

Shalva Weil, a senior researcher and noted anthropologist at Hebrew University, wrote in her paper, Dual Conversion Among the Shinlung of North-East (1965):

Revivalism (among the Mizo) is a recurrent phenomenon distinctive of the Welsh form of Presbyterianism. Certain members of the congregation who easily fall into ecstasy are believed to be visited by the Holy Ghost and the utterings are received as prophecies." (Steven Fuchs 1965: 16).

Anthony Gilchrist McCall, in 1949, recorded several incidents of revivalism, including the "Kelkang incident", in which three men "spoke in tongues", claiming to be the medium through which God spoke to men. Their following was large and widespread until they clashed with the colonial superintendent. He put down the movement and removed the "sorcery".

In a 2004 study, Weil says, "although there is no documentary evidence linking the tribal peoples in northeast India with the myth of the lost Israelites, it appears likely that, as with revivalism, the concept was introduced by the missionaries as part of their general millenarian leanings."

In the 19th and 20th centuries, Christian missionaries "discovered" lost tribes in far-flung places; their enthusiasm for identifying such peoples as part of the Israelite tribes was related to the desire to speed up the messianic era and bring on the Redemption. Based on his experience in China, for example, Scottish missionary Rev. T.F. Torrance wrote China’s Ancient Israelites (1937), expounding a theory that the Qiang people were lost Israelites. This theory has not been supported by any more rigorous studies.

Some of the Mizo-Kuki-Chin say they have an oral tradition that the tribe traveled through Persia, Afghanistan, Tibet, China and on to India, where it eventually settled in the northeastern states of Manipur and Mizoram.

According to Tongkhohao Aviel Hangshing, leader of the Bnei Menashe in Imphal, the capital of Manipur, when the Bible was translated into local languages in the 1970s, the people began to study it themselves. Hangshing said, "And we found that the stories, the customs and practices of the Israeli people were very similar to ours. So we thought that we must be one of the lost tribes." After making contact with Israelis, they began to study normative Judaism and established several synagogues. Hundreds of Mizo-Kuki-Chin emigrated to Israel. They were required to formally convert to be accepted as Jews, because their history was not documented. Also, given their long migration and intermarriage, they had lost the required maternal ancestry of Jews, by which they might be considered as born Jews.

=== Operation Wings of Dawn ===
In November 2025, the Israeli government approved a five-year plan to complete the Aliyah of the remaining Bnei Menashe community from India. On 23 April 2026, the first batch of approximately 240-250 members arrived in Israel as part of "Operation Wings of Dawn," with around 1,200 expected to arrive by the end of 2026 and the full relocation of about 5,000-6,000 people projected by 2030. Prime Minister Benjamin Netanyahu called the decision "important and Zionist," stating it would strengthen northern Israel and the Galilee region.

== Work of aliyah groups, Amishav and Shavei Israel ==
In the late 20th century, the Israeli Rabbi Eliyahu Avichail founded Amishav (Hebrew for "My People Returns"), an organisation dedicated to locating descendants of the lost tribes of Israel and assisting them in aliyah. In 1983, he first learned of the Messianic/Jewish group in northeastern India, after meeting Zaithanchhungi, an insurance saleswoman and former teacher who came from the area. She had traveled to Israel in 1981 to present papers at seminars about her people's connection to Judaism.

During the 1980s, Avichail traveled to northeast India several times to investigate the people's claims. He helped the people do research and collect historical documentation. The people were observed to have some practices similar to Judaism:

- Three festivals are held annually, similar to those of Jews
- Funeral rites, birth and marriage ceremonies have similarities to ancient Judaism
- Historical claim of descent from a great ancestor "Manmási", whose descriptions are similar to those of Manasseh, son of Joseph.
- Local legends, primarily those of the Hmar, that describe the presence of remnants of the lost Jewish tribe of Manasseh (Hebrew: Menashe) more than 1,000 years ago in a cave in southwestern China called Sinlung, whose members migrated across Thailand into northeastern India.

Believing that these people were descendants of Israelites, Avichail named the group Bnei Menashe. He began to teach them normative Orthodox Judaism. He prepared to pay for their aliyah with funds provided by Christian groups supporting the Second Coming. But the Israeli government did not recognize the Messianic groups in India as candidates for aliyah.

Several years later, the rabbi stepped aside as a leader of Amishav in favour of Michael Freund, a columnist for The Jerusalem Post and former deputy director of communications and policy planning in the Prime Minister's office.

Freund founded another organization, Shavei Israel, also devoted to supporting aliyah by descendants of lost tribes. Each of the two men has attracted the support of some Bnei Menashe in Israel. "Kuki-Mizo tribal rivalries and clans have also played a role in the split, with some groups supporting one man and some the other." Freund uses some of his private fortune to support Shavei Israel. It has helped provide Jewish education for the Bnei Menashe in Aizawl and Imphal, the capitals of two northeast Indian states.

In mid-2005, with the help of Shavei Israel and the local council of Kiryat Arba, the Bnei Menashe opened its first community centre in Israel. They have built several synagogues in northeast India. In July 2005, they completed a mikveh (ritual bath) in Mizoram under the supervision of Israeli rabbis. This is used in Orthodox Jewish practice, and its use is required as part of the formal Orthodox process of conversion of candidates to Judaism. Shortly after, Bnei Menashe built a mikveh in Manipur.

== DNA testing results ==
Observers thought that DNA testing might indicate whether there was Middle Eastern ancestry among the Bnei Menashe. Some resisted such testing, acknowledging that their ancestors had intermarried with other people but saying that did not change their sense of identification as Jews. In 2003, author Hillel Halkin helped arrange genetic testing of Mizo-Kuki people. A total of 350 genetic samples were tested at Haifa's Technion – Israel Institute of Technology under the auspices of Karl Skorecki. According to the late Isaac Hmar Intoate, a scholar involved with the project, researchers found no genetic evidence of Middle Eastern ancestry for the Mizo-Chin-Kuki men. The study has not been published in a peer-reviewed journal.

In December 2004, Kolkata's Central Forensic Science Laboratory posted a paper at Genome Biology on the Internet. This had not been peer reviewed. They tested a total of 414 people from tribal communities (Hmar, Kuki, Mara, Lai and Lusei) of the state of Mizoram. They found no evidence among the men of Y-DNA haplotypes indicating Middle Eastern origin. Instead, the haplotypes were distinctly East and Southeast Asian in origin.

In 2005, additional tests of mtDNA were conducted for 50 women from these communities. The researchers said they found some evidence of Middle Eastern origin, which may have been an indicator of intermarriage during the people's lengthy migration period. While DNA is not used as a determinant of Jewish ancestry, it can be an indicator. It has been found in the Y-DNA among descendants in some other populations distant from the Middle East who claim Jewish descent, some of whose ancestors are believed to have been male Jewish traders.

Karl Skorecki, a professor of human population genetics, said of the Kolkata studies that the geneticists "did not do a complete 'genetic sequencing' of all the DNA and therefore it is hard to rely on the conclusions derived from a 'partial sequencing', and they themselves admit this." He added

that the absence of a genetic match still does not say that the Kuki do not have origins in the Jewish people, as it is possible that after thousands of years, it is difficult to identify the traces of a common genetic origin. However, a positive answer can give a significant indication.

BBC News reported, "[T]he Central Forensic Institute in Calcutta suggests that while the masculine side of the tribes bears no links to Israel, the feminine side suggests a genetic profile with Middle Eastern people that may have arisen through inter-marriage". The social scientist Lev Grinberg commented that "right wing Jewish groups wanted such conversions of distant people to boost the population in areas disputed by the Palestinians."

== Acceptance ==
In April 2005, it was alleged by Michael Freund that the Sephardi Chief Rabbi Shlomo Amar, one of Israel's two Chief Rabbis, had formally accepted the Bnei Menashe as descendants of one of the lost tribes after putatively spending years of review of their claims and other research. The documentation produced formed the basis for a decision to allow the Bnei Menashe to immigrate as Jews to Israel ostensibly under the country's Law of Return, though in practice he facilitated their emigration by bypassing the regulations and legal criteria set by the Israeli Ministry of Absorption.

The Israeli Bnei Menashe now recount that, after Avichail asked him to do so, Rabbi Amar dispatched three dayanim (religious judges) to Manipur to conduct interviews and investigate the claims of Israelite descent. It was then alleged, on the basis of a positive report that Amar then decided to recognize them fully.

In 2015, an investigative reporter found evidence that Amar had ruled to the contrary that the Bnei Menashe were not of the 'seed of Israel', and Amar confirmed he had made no such judgement and that they neither had Jewish ancestry nor were halakhic Jews.

By 2006, some 1,700 Bnei Menashe had moved to Israel, where they were settled in the West Bank and Gaza Strip, before the disengagement. They were required to undergo Orthodox conversion to Judaism, including study and immersion in a mikveh. The immigrants were put in the settlements as these offered cheaper housing and living expenses than some other areas. The Bnei Menashe composed the largest immigrant population in the Gaza Strip before Israel withdrew its settlers from the area. Now they are mainly concentrated in Kiryat Arba, Sderot, Beit El, Ofra, Nitzan, Karmiel, Afula and Maalot.

Learning Hebrew has been a great challenge, especially for the older generation, for whom the phonology of their native Indic and Tibeto-Burman languages – many of them mutually unintelligible and thus forcing the Bnei Menashe to converse among themselves in broken Hebrew – makes Hebrew especially challenging. Younger members have had more opportunities to learn Hebrew, as they are more involved in society. Some have gained jobs as soldiers; others as nurses' aides for the elderly and infirm.

By 2024, more than a hundred Bnei Menashe families had settled in the Israeli city of Sderot, which is located within a mile of Gaza and had by 2024 completed the construction of a synagogue and beit midrash (Torah study hall), contributed to the community by Sderot's mayor, Alon Davidi.

As of January 2026, many more are getting ready to relocate to Israel, with the Israeli government's plan, which was approved in late 2025. Most of the candidates have already been interviewed by December 2025. The first group of 240 immigrants arrived in April 2026 as part of the "Wings of Dawn" initiative, which, according to representatives of the Israeli government, could eventually bring 1,200 people by the end of 2026 and nearly 6,000 people from the community to Israel by 2030. Before moving, each person must go through a screening process.

== Political issues in Israel and India ==
In June 2003, Interior Minister Avraham Poraz of Shinui halted Bnei Menashe immigration to Israel. Shinui leaders had expressed concern that "only Third World residents seem interested in converting and immigrating to Israel."

Ofir Pines-Paz, Minister of Science and Technology, said that the Bnei Menashe were "being cynically exploited for political purposes." He objected to the new immigrants being settled in the unstable territory of the Gaza Strip's Gush Katif settlements (which were evacuated two years later) and in the West Bank. Rabbi Eliyahu Birnbaum, a rabbinical judge dealing with the conversion of Bnei Menashe, accused the Knesset Absorption Committee of making a decision based on racist ideas. At the time, Michael Freund, with the Amishav organization, noted that assimilation was proceeding; young men of the Bnei Menashe served in Israeli combat units.

The rapid rise in conversions also provoked political controversy in Mizoram, India. The Indian government believed that the conversions encouraged identification with another country, in an area already characterized by separatist unrest. P.C. Biaksiama of the Aizawl Christian Research Centre said,

[T]he mass conversion by foreign priests will pose a threat not only to social stability in the region, but also to national security. A large number of people will forsake loyalty to the Union of India, as they all will become eligible for a foreign citizenship.

He wrote the book, Mizo Nge Israel? ("Mizo or Israel?") (2004), exploring this issue. He does not think the people have a legitimate claim to Jewish descent. Leaders of the Presbyterian Church in Mizoram, the largest denomination, have objected to the Israelis' activity there.

In March 2004, Biaksiama appeared on television, discussing the issues with Lalchhanhima Sailo, founder of Chhinlung Israel People's Convention (CIPC), a secessionist Mizo organization. The region has had numerous separatist movements and India has struggled to maintain peace there.

In July 2006, Israeli Immigration Absorption Minister Ze'ev Boim said that the 218 Bnei Menashe who had completed their conversions would be allowed to enter the country, but "first the government must decide what its policy will be towards those who have yet to (formally) convert." A few months later, in November 2006, the 218 Bnei Menashe arrived in Israel and were settled in Nazareth Illit and Karmiel. The government has encouraged more people to settle in the Galilee and the Negev.

In October 2007, the Israeli government said that approval of travelers' entry into Israel for the purpose of mass conversion and citizenship would have to be decided by the full Cabinet, rather than by the Interior Minister alone. This decision was expected to be a major obstacle in Shavei Israel's endeavours to bring all Bnei Menashe to Israel. The government suspended issuing visas to the Bnei Menashe.

In 2012, after a change in government, the Israel legislature passed a resolution to resume allowing immigration of Bnei Menashe. Fifty-four entered the country in January 2013, making a total of 200 immigrants, according to Shavei Israel. As of 13 December 2023, 5,000 Bnei Menashe have immigrated to Israel.

In November 2025, the Israeli government announced the approval of bringing 5,800 Bnei Menashe members to Israel from India for settlement in the Galilee over the next five years by 2030. The plan, presented by the Minister of Aliyah and Integration Ofir Sofer, is estimated to require a budget of approximately 90 million Israeli new shekels or around $27 million, to cover the flights, conversion classes, housing, Hebrew lessons, and other special benefits.

== Legends ==
All of the folklore that supports the Bnei Menashe's Jewish ancestry is similar to Hmar history. One such is the traditional Hmar harvest festival (Sikpui Ruoi) song, "Sikpui Hla (Sikpui Song)," which refers to events and images similar to some in the Book of Exodus, and is evidence of their Israelite ancestry. Studies of comparative religion, however, have demonstrated recurring motifs and symbols in unrelated religions and peoples in many regions. In addition, other Mizo-Kuki-Hmar people say that this song is an ancient one of their culture. The song includes references to enemies chasing the people over a red-coloured sea, quails, and a pillar of cloud. Such images and symbols are not exclusive to Judaism.

Translation of the lyrics:

While we are preparing for the Sikpui Feast,
The big red sea becomes divided;
As we march along fighting our foes,
We are being led by pillar of cloud by day,
And pillar of fire by night.
Our enemies, O ye folks, are thick with fury,
Come out with your shields and arrows.
Fighting our enemies all day long,
We march forward as cloud-fire goes before us.
The enemies we fought all day long,
The big sea swallowed them like wild beast.
Collect the quails,
And draw the water that springs out of the rock.

Michael Freund, the director of Shavei Israel, wrote that the Bnei Menashe claim to have a chant they call "Miriam's Prayer." By that time, he had been involved for years in promoting the Bnei Menashe as descended from Jews and working to facilitate their aliyah to Israel. He said that the words of the chant were identical to the ancient Sikpui Song. The Post article is the first known print reference to Miriam's Prayer, aka "Sikpui Hla."

== Films ==
- Quest for the Lost Tribes (2000). Director: Simcha Jacobovici
- Return of the Lost Tribe. Director: Phillipe Stroun
- This Song Is Old (2009), Director: Bruce Sheridan
- A Prayer for Aliyah (2012). Director: Zorawar Shukla

== See also ==
- Bene Ephraim
- Gathering of Israel
- History of the Jews in India
