= Shalva Weil =

Israeli professor and researcher of Jewish communities in India and Ethiopia

- שלוה וייל (Hebrew)
- Born: London, England
- Education: London School of Economics; University of Sussex
- Occupation: Researcher
- Employer: Hebrew University of Jerusalem
- Discipline: Anthropology, Sociology, Ethnohistory

Shalva Weil (Hebrew: שלוה וייל) is a Senior Researcher at The Seymour Fox School of Education at the Hebrew University of Jerusalem, and Life Member at Clare Hall, University of Cambridge, UK. In 2017, she was GIAN Distinguished Professor at Jawaharlal Nehru University, in New Delhi. She has researched Indian Jews, Ethiopian Jews, Baghdadi Jews, the Ten Lost Tribes and Femicide. In 2023, she was appointed a Fellow of the Royal Historical Society. In 2025 she was awarded the Yakir Yerushalayim prize, recognising her long contributions to Jewish scholarship and education. In particular the award is granted to Weil because of her unique connection to Jerusalem, as a leading figure there for more than 50 years.

== Education ==
Shalva Weil was born in London and studied sociology (B.A. Hons.) at the London School of Economics (L.S.E). She received an M.A. at the Centre for Multi-Racial Studies, Sussex University, with a thesis on a double identity conflict among Bene Israel Indian Jews in Britain, supervised by the psychologist Marie Jahoda. She obtained a D. Phil. in Social Anthropology at Sussex, under the supervision of Prof. A.L. Epstein. Her doctoral thesis on "The Persistence of Ethnicity and Ethnic Identity among the Bene Israel Indian Jews in Israel" (1977) was based on three years' fieldwork among the Bene Israel in the town of Lod.

In 1978 Weil started her academic career as a lecturer at the Hebrew University of Jerusalem, first in the Department of Sociology, and then in the NCJW Research Institute for Innovation in Education. Today Weil is a Senior Researcher in Seymour Fox School of Education. She is also a Fellow in UNISA (University of South Africa) and a Life Member at Clare Hall, University of Cambridge.

She has published over 250 academic papers, and is known as a world expert in several topics, including: Indian Jews, Ethiopian Jews and Femicide.

== Academic work ==
=== Methodological approaches to research ===
Weil utilizes diverse methodological tools such as the mapping tool, diaries, interviews, focus groups, and life histories, and has written on the value of qualitative research. She documented violence in schools in a joint Israeli-Palestinian project, and conducted a qualitative study on pedagogic change in schools among Israeli principals, commissioned by Avnei Rosha, an Institute in Jerusalem.

In 2010, she interviewed Prof. S.N. Eisenstadt, in the last interview before he died. As editor of European Sociologist, she interviewed Prof. Zygmunt Bauman. She coordinated the European Sociological Association (ESA) Qualitative Methods Research Network (2005-2007), taught methods at the ESA's Summer School in Finland in 2010, and collaborated with colleagues to co-chair a European Science Foundation (ESF) workshop on the legitimacy of qualitative methods. From 2007-11, Weil served as a member of the ESA Executive Committee, and until 2025 served as a board member of the ESA Research Networks on gender and qualitative methods.

=== Indian Jewry ===
Weil has published over 250 scientific articles, chapters and books, of which 100 articles are on India Jews, including the Bene Israel, Cochin Jews, Baghdadi Jews, the Shinlung (“Bnei Menashe”) and Europeans in India. She is editor of India's Jewish Heritage: Ritual, Art, and Life-Cycle (Marg 2002; 3rd edition 2009), co-editor (with Nathan Katz, Ranabir Chakravarti and Braj M. Sinha) of Indo-Judaic Studies in the Twenty-First Century: A Perspective from the Margin (Palgrave-Macmillan, 2007); co-editor (with David Shulman) of Karmic Passages: Israeli Scholarship on India (Delhi: Oxford University Press 2008), and editored The Baghdadi Jews in India: Maintaining Communities, Negotiating Identities and Creating Super-Diversity (Routledge, 2019), and The Jews of Goa (Primus, 2021). Her latest articles on Indians Jews include: ‘The Bene Israel Indian Jewish Family in Transnational Context' (Weil, 2024) and 'Oscillating Diasporas' (Weil, 2025).

Weil is founding Chairperson of the Israel-India Cultural Association with Zubin Mehta as president, and is a board member of the Israel-India Friendship Association. In 1991, she curated an exhibition at Beth Hatefutsoth: the Museum of the Jewish Diaspora, today ANU, on the Ten Lost Tribes. In 2002, she co-organized an international conference at Oxford University on Indo-Judaic studies, a field in which she is a forerunner. In 2006, she co-curated an exhibition on the Jews of Chendamangalam in the newly restored village synagogue in Kerala.

In March 2013, she lectured and co-organized a conference in Eilat, Israel and Aqaba, Jordan on ancient trade in the Red Sea. In May 2013, she was invited to lecture at Stanford University on the Kirtan among Indian Jews, followed by lectures in the Department of South Asian Studies at Santa Barbara University, and at the Magnes Museum at Berkeley University in California on the reconstruction of synagogues in Kerala. In 2017, she was invited to be a keynote speaker at IGNCA at a symposium on India's Jews, while she was a GIAN distinguished Professor at Jawaharlal Nehru University, Delhii. In 2018, she attended the meetings in Mumbai with PM Benjamin Netanyahu and the Indian Jewish community.

=== Ethiopian Jewry ===
Weil's studies on Ethiopian Jews have been commissioned by government ministries: on religion, one-parent families, education, leadership, and femicide. In 2005, she was elected President of SOSTEJE (Society for the Study of Ethiopian Jewry) at Addis Ababa University, and in this capacity organized international conferences on the Beta Israel: in Florence, Italy and in Gondar, Ethiopia, as well as writing regular newsletters on the study of Ethiopian Jewry until her resignation in 2012. She has written over 100 scientific articles on Ethiopian Jews, as well as several books, including a volume (together with Emanuela Trevisan Semi): Beta Israel: the Jews of Ethiopia and Beyond (Venice: Cafoscarina, 2011). For 12 years, she directed an outreach program to promote excellence in education among Ethiopian Jews in Israel. she has written about the complexities of conversion among the Felesmura, and has conducted original research into Dr. Faitlovitch's Ethiopian Jews students educated in Europe (1905-1940). Her book (with Emanula Trevison Semi) on this subject will be published in 2026.

=== Femicide ===
Weil has been studying femicide since 2008, when there was a disproportionate number of Ethiopian immigrant women who were killed by their partner. From 2013–7 Weil Chaired a COST (Cooperation on Science and Technology) action on "Femicide Across Europe" with 80 representatives from 30 countries on the management committee. The Action set up four working groups in Europe on definitions, on reporting, on culture, and on prevention. Weil called to make femicide a visible sociological fact, while recognizing that its study is a social challenge. Femicide is difficult to research among migrants and utilizing qualitative methods. It affects girls, not just women, particularly in countries like India. Weil's recent publications include the connections between femicide and the COVID-19 pandemic, both of which she considers pandemics, the issue of female geronticide (the killing of elderly women), and femicide in the context of war and peace. Weil is on the Advisory Board of the European Observatory on Femicide (EOF) which she established in 2017 and several other observatories. She directs the Israel Observatory on Femicide (IOF), set up in 2020, which monitors femicide in Israel. In 2025 she reseacrhed femicide among Arabs and Druze Israelis. In June 2025, she lectured on 'extreme violence against women during peace and war' at Sapienza University, Rome.

=== Ten Lost Tribes ===
Weil has published extensively on the Ten Lost Tribes historically and in contemporary times. In particular, she has written on the Beta Israel, the Bene Israel, and the Pashtuns, as well as on Judaising groups all over Africa, China and elsewhere. In 1991, she curated an exhibition at Beth Hatefutsoth: the Museum of the Jewish Diaspora on the Ten Lost Tribes entitled "Beyond the Sambatyon: the Myth of the Ten Lost Tribes". She is on the international board of ISSAJ (International Society for the Study of African Jewry), and presented a paper at their latest conference in Nairobi on the Jews of Africa. In 2025 she attended a conference in Capetown, South Africa, on 'Jewish Africa'.

== Publications ==
=== Books ===
- 1984 From Cochin to Israel, Jerusalem: Kumu Berina. (Hebrew)
- 1997 Ethiopian Jews in the Limelight, Jerusalem: Research Institute for Innovation in Education, Hebrew University.
- 1999 Roots and Routes: Ethnicity and Migration in Global Perspective, Jerusalem: Magnes Press, Hebrew University.
- 2004 Bibliography of Ethiopian Jewry, Addis Abeba: SOSTEJE (Society for the Study of Ethiopian Jewry).
- 2007 Katz N., Chakravarti, R., Sinha, B. M. and Weil, S. Indo-Judaic Studies in the Twenty-First Century: A Perspective from the Margin, New York and Basingstoke, England: Palgrave-Macmillan Press.
- 2008 Shulman, D. and Weil, S. Karmic Passages: Israeli Scholarship on India, New Delhi: Oxford University Press.
- 2009 (Third reprint) India's Jewish Heritage: Ritual, Art and Life-Cycle, Mumbai: Marg Publications [first published in 2002; second reprint 2004].
- 2011 Trevisan Semi, E. and Weil, S. Beta Israel: the Jews of Ethiopia and Beyond, Venice: Cafoscarina.
- 2018 Weil, S., Corradi, C. and Naudi, M. Femicide across Europe: theory, research and prevention, Bristol: Policy Press.
- 2019 The Baghdadi Jews in India: Maintaining Communities, Negotiating Identities and Creating Super-Diversity, London: Routledge.
- 2020 The Jews of Goa, New Delhi: Primus.
- 2023 Femicide in War and Peace, London and New York: Routledge.
- 2024a Weil. ‘The Transmutation of the Beta Israel Family in Ethiopia to the Ethiopian Jewish Family in Israel’, in: Harriet Hartman (ed.) The Jewish Family inGlobal Perspective, Cham: Springer, pp. 127-138. https://doi.org/10.1007/978-3-031-45006-8_6
- 2024b, Weil. ‘The Bene Israel Indian Jewish Family in Transnational Context,’ in: Harriet Hartman (ed.) The Jewish Family in Global Perspective, Cham: Springer, pp. 257-268. https://doi.org/10.1007/978-3-031-45006-8_13
- 2024c, Weil. ‘Bene Israel Indian Jews in Aden: the Rise and Fall of an Unknown Jewish Community’, in: Drora Arussy and Rachel Yadid (eds.) Aden:Social, Cultural, and Communal Histories of a Multicultural Port. Rehovot: E’eleh beTamar, pp.9-17.
- 2025a, Weil. ‘An Aesthetic Hybridity: Walter Kaufmann’s Refuge in India during the Nazi Period,’ in: Joanne Miyang Cho, Eric Kurlander and Douglas McGetchin (eds.). German-Speaking Jewish Refugees in Asia, 1930–1950: Shelter from the Storm? New York and Oxford: Routledge, pp. 277-294.
- 2025b, Weil. ‘Re-defining Empowerment: PNIMA Project for Women of Caucasian Origin,’ in: Elite Olshtain, Ayala Berkovitch and Gali Palti (eds.) Innovative Educational Environments. Tel Aviv: Riesling, pp. 393-418 (Hebrew).
- 2025c, Weil. ‘Oscillating Diasporas, Shifting Identities: Bene Israel Indian Jews in Aden 1839-1967.’ Indian Economic and Social History Review 62 (2).

=== Film (featured) ===
- 2023 Mythos: Die verlorenen Stämme Israels: Die größten Rätsel der Geschichte

=== Podcast ===
- 2024 What on Earth is Peace
- 2004 The Baghdadi Jews in India: Maintaining Communities, Negotiating Identities and Creating Super-Diversity
