= Ilyinka, Talovsky District, Voronezh Oblast =

Ilyinka Ильинка
- Settlement
- Interactive map of Ilyinka
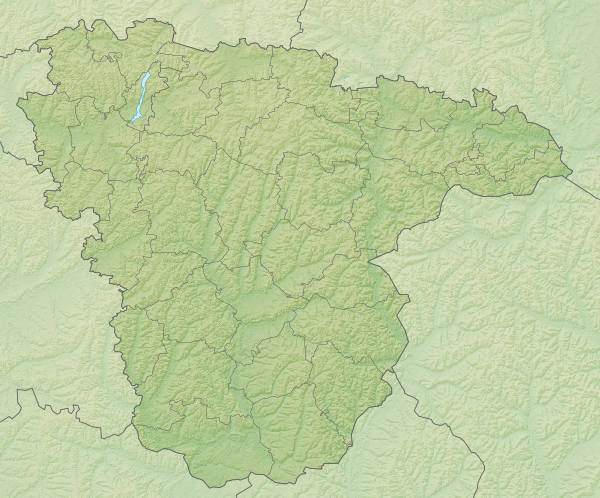
- Location within Voronezh Oblast Location within Russia
- Coordinates: 51°15′17″N 40°50′58″E
- Country: Russia
- Region: Voronezh Oblast
- District: Talovsky District
- Time zone: UTC+3:00

Ilyinka (Russian: Ильинка) is a rural locality (a settlement) in Alexandrovskoye Rural Settlement, Talovsky District, Voronezh Oblast, Russia. The population was 283 as of 2010.

Ilyinka was founded in 1920-21 by Subbotniks. Between 1973 and 1991, almost all the Subbotniks of Ilyinka emigrated and left for Israel.

== Geography ==
Ilyinka is located 28 km northeast of Talovaya (the district's administrative centre) by road. Kazanka is the nearest rural locality.
