= Yesud HaMa'ala =

Yesud HaMa'ala: יְסוּד הַמַּעֲלָה; يسود حمالاه
- Local council

Hebrew transcription(s)
  - ISO 259: Ysud ha Maˁla
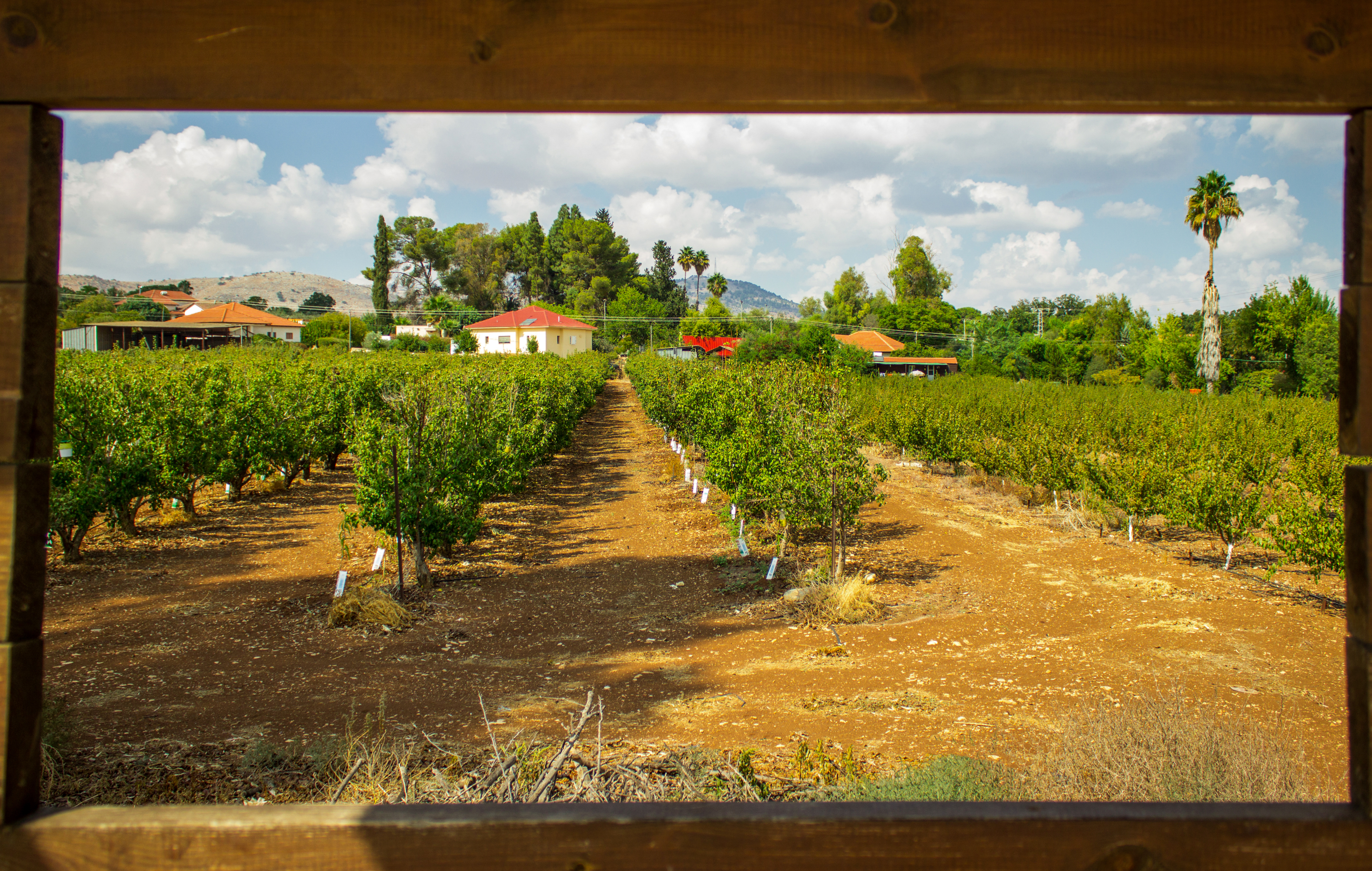

- Location within Northeast Israel Location within Israel
- Coordinates: 33°3′22″N 35°36′15″E
- Country: Israel
- District: Northern
- Subdistrict: Safed
- Natural Region: Hula Valley
- Founded: 1882; 144 years ago
- Founder: Ya'akov Chai Abo

Area
  - Total: 11,587 dunams (11.587 km^{2}; 4.474 sq mi)

Population (2024)
  - Total: 1,930
  - Density: 167/km^{2} (431/sq mi)

Yesud HaMa'ala (Hebrew: יְסוּד הַמַּעֲלָה) is a moshava and local council in northern Israel. The moshava was the first modern Jewish community in the Hula Valley. Built in 1883, the community was among a series of agricultural settlements founded during the First Aliyah. In 2024 it had a population of 1,930.

== Etymology ==
The name of the village was taken from a sentence in the Hebrew Bible: "He (Ezra) determined to go up." (Ezra 7:9), which was connected to the Zionist Aliyah.

== Geography ==
In the late 19th century, the Hulah Valley was mostly swampland and the 15,000 acre (61 km^{2}) shallow Lake Hula. The region was a well-known breeding ground for mosquitoes, and as a result concerns about malaria restricted further Jewish settlement in the region for fifty years. As drainage technology and pesticide use increased in the 1920s, settlement in the area became more feasible.

After the 1948 Arab–Israeli War and the establishment of the state of Israel, the swamp was drained and converted into agricultural land. Recognizing the unique ecosystem of the valley and its importance as a stopover for migrating birds, scientists lobbied for a small portion of the swamp to remain as a nature reserve. In 1964, the 800 acre (3.2 km^{2}) Hula Valley Nature Reserve, the country's first, was opened.

== History ==
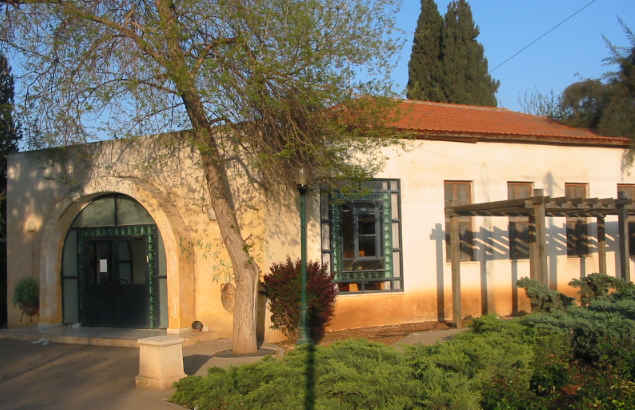
Yesud HaMa'ala synagogue

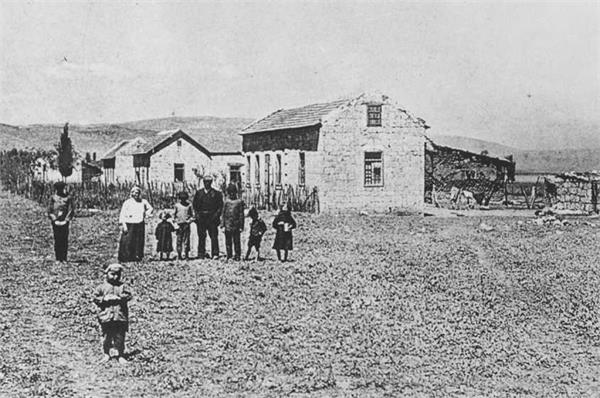
Yesud Hama’Ala: First house 1911

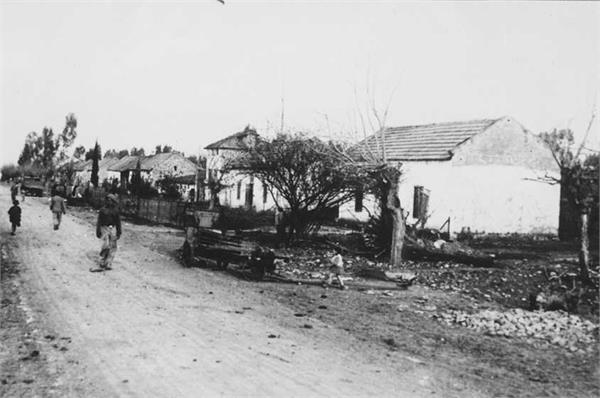
Yesud Hama’Ala 1937

Christian Zionist Laurence Oliphant donated 1,000 roubles to the founding settlers of Yesud Hama’Ala.

A census conducted in 1922 by the British Mandate authorities, recorded a population of 142 Jews. With the activation of the National Water Carrier in 1964, Syrian efforts to disrupt drainage patterns into the Sea of Galilee were accompanied by attacks against Israeli farming and fishing activities in the region. Three years later, Syrian forces were repelled further from Yesud HaMa'ala with the capture of the Golan Heights during the 1967 Six-Day War.

On 22 July 2006, a series of Katyusha attacks by Hezbollah struck communities in the Hulah Valley during the course of the 2006 Lebanon War. In Yesud HaMa’ala, one person was lightly wounded from rocket shrapnel. Prior to the bombings, the community had not seen any hostile attacks since the Six-Day War in 1967. On 29 July three rockets hit Yesud HaMa'ala, lightly wounding a woman and damaging property.

== Landmarks ==
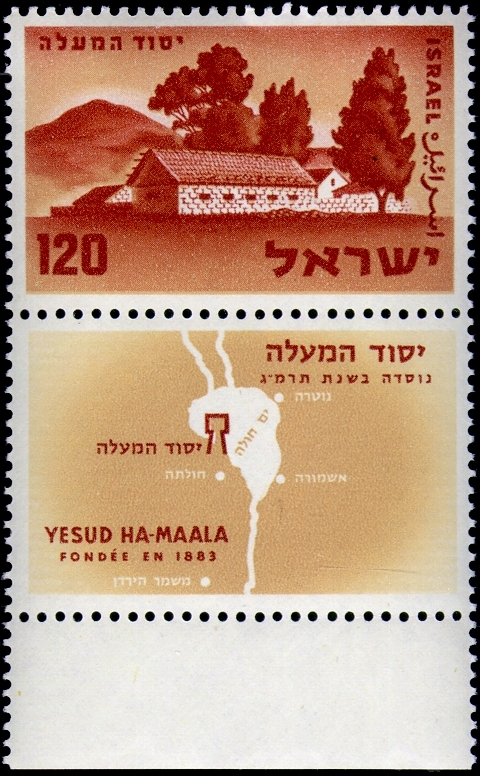
Yesud Hama'ala commemorative stamp

Yesud HaMa'ala is home to the Dubrovin Farm, a museum commemorating the founders of the community, containing personal possessions and furniture from 19th century Russia. Part of the museum includes ruins of a synagogue dating between the 4th and 6th centuries, highlighting the historic Jewish claim to the region. Tel Hazor is very close, even closer than to Hatzor HaGlilit which is named after it (when Yesud HaMa'ala was founded the Tel was not excavated yet).
