= Strigolniki =

14th–15th-century Russian religious sect

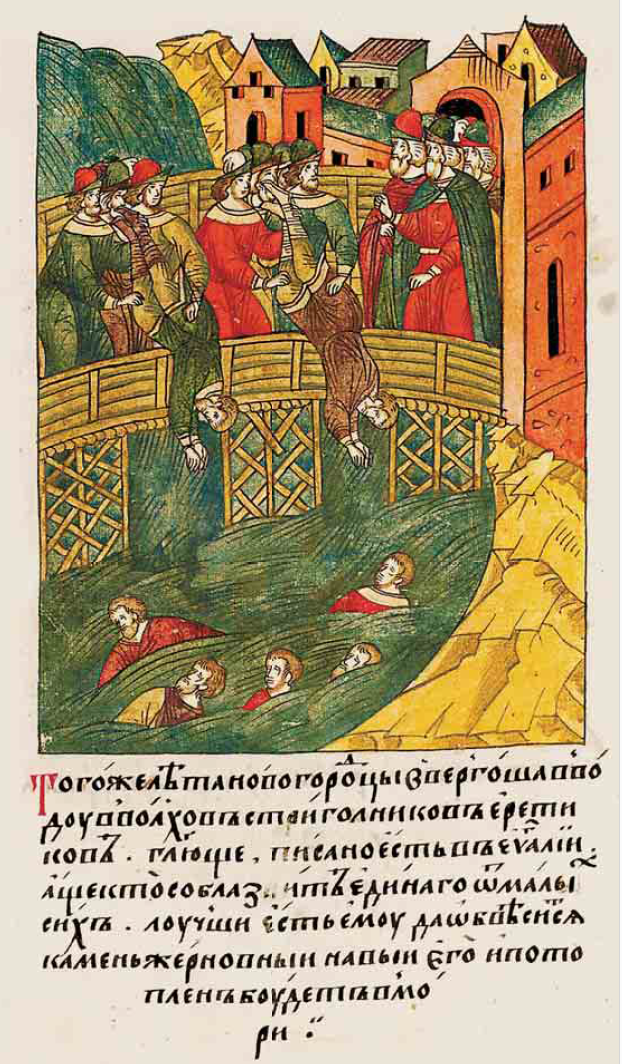
Strigolniki being thrown into the Volkhov River from a bridge in 1375, miniature from Illustrated Chronicle of Ivan the Terrible.

The strigolniki (Russian: стригольники; sing. стригольник, strigolnik) were followers of a Russian religious sect which appeared in the mid-14th century, known as strigolnichestvo (Russian: стригольничество). They first appeared in Pskov before spreading to Novgorod and Tver. By the early 15th century, they had disappeared. Along with the Judaizers, they were one of the major sects in medieval Russia.

The origins of the name remain unclear. Some historians believe it has something to do with handicrafts that the first strigolniki were engaged in, such as cloth-cutting or hairdressing (it appears that the word strigolnik derives from the Russian root strig-, which connotes cutting or trimming). Others think the name comes from a special initiation ceremony (a specific haircut, or strizhka), performed by a deacon named Karp – a supposed founder of the sect (together with deacon Nikita), yet others think it could mean that these people refused to either grow a beard or cut their beards when they entered churches.

Active participants of the sect were tradespeople and low-ranking clergy. They renounced all ecclesiastic hierarchy and monasticism, sacraments done by Russian clergy due to recognizing the Orthodox priesthood as illegitimate: priesthood, communion, penance, and baptism, which had been accompanied by large fees ("extortions", in their view) to the benefit of the clergy. Criticizing and exposing the venality, vices, and ignorance of the priests, the strigolniki demanded the right to a religious sermon for laymen. Their sermons were full of social motifs: they reproached the rich for enslaving the free and the poor. They were opposed by a number of high-level Russian bishops.

== Beliefs ==
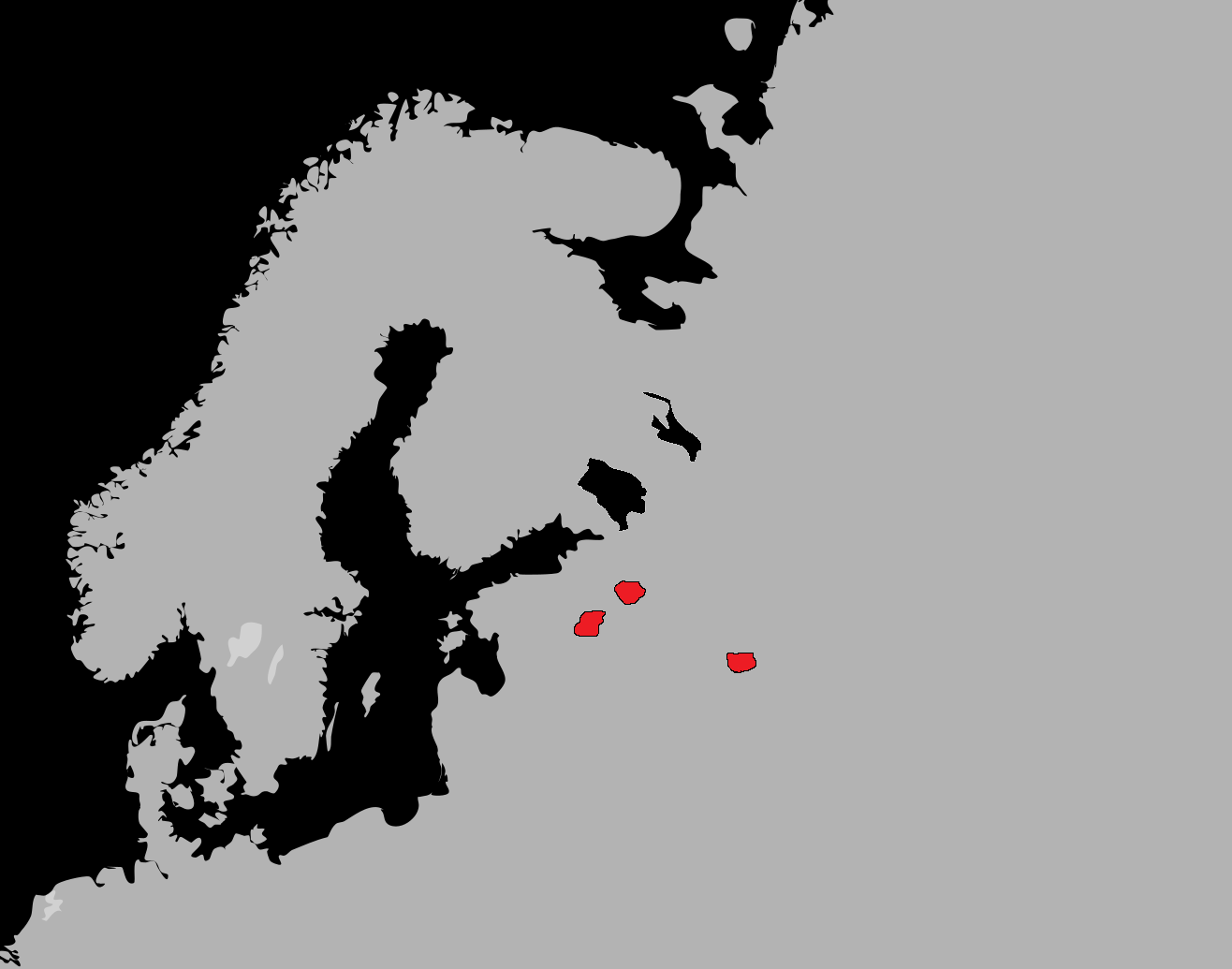
Spread of the Strigolniki

There is some debate if the strigolniki were "heretical", if they were a proto-Protestant movement among Orthodox Christians, being similar to Lollardy or the Hussites, or if they merely opposed the priesthood. The strigolniki movement has been suggested to have had iconoclastic tendencies, though it is not clear if they came out against the use of icons. It is clearer that they came out against monasticism.

The strigolniki opposed the ruling church, refusing to recognize its bishops and priests, and rejected going to Orthodox churches, instead gathering at separate meetings. They are also known to have criticized Orthodox priests whom they called "drunkards". They also repudiated ordainment, believing that simple laymen could perform church service, and the established church rituals. They also criticized the feudal order. The nature of the movement is seen from the words of Stephen of Perm: "Of the strigolniki illiterate people say: those neither steal nor collect wealth".

Karetnikova suggested that the strigolniki were a response to changes in the Russian Orthodox Church, wanting to return from ritualism to the simplicity of New Testament Christianity, emphasizing the spiritual meaning of the sacraments and basing their views primarily on scripture, seeing it as their ultimate authority. Based on surviving sources they did not have a dogmatic system of theology and did not disagree with the church about Christology and on soteriology, instead most of their disagreements being with ecclesiology. Petrushko, judging by the fact that Photius believed it possible to return the strigolniki to the church, believes their disagreement with Orthodox dogma was not as dramatic as the Heresy of the Judaizers.

M. V. Pechnikov argued that the strigolniki merely rejected the Orthodox priesthood, simony and confession to clergy, while not denying the sacraments of the church nor most dogma.

Stephen of Perm mentioned that the strigolniki did not confess their sins to clergy but instead to the ground; however, the meaning of what Stephen meant is not clear.

== History ==
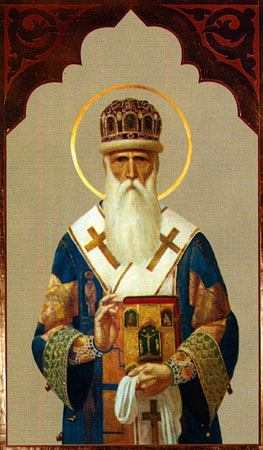
Metropolitan Photius wrote about his opposition to the strigolniki.

According to an epistle by Stephen of Perm, Karp "began to tell the people: it is neither dignified to sing over the dead, nor to mention them; nor to bring offerings for the dead to the church; nor to have feasts; nor to give alms for the soul of the departed".

Deacon Karp found many followers in Pskov, but had to move to Novgorod to avoid persecution. Some scholars argue that the archbishop of Novgorod, Vasily Kalika (1330–1352), ignored the heresy, but that his successors, Moisei (1325–1330; 1352–1359) and Aleksei (1359–1388), took firm measures against the heretics. Beginning in 1382, the sect was opposed by Archbishop Dionysios of Suzdal. In epistles addressed to the clergy and the inhabitants of Novgorod and Pskov, the leadership of the church attempted to discredit the movement and prove its right to earn its income. The strigolniki faced persecution, being driven from towns or simply killed.

In 1375, enraged citizens of Novgorod threw three heretics from the bridge into the Volkhov River. According to the 16th-century Nikon Chronicle, the justification for this was a literal interpretation of the Gospel (Matthew 18:6): "Whoever causes one of these little ones who believe in me to sin, it were better for him to have a great milestone hung around his neck, and to be drowned in the depths of the sea". The chronicles mention that "the heretic strigolniki were beaten; deacon Nikita and Parishioner Karp and a third man with them were thrown from the bridge".

Stephen of Perm wrote a letter to Nilus of Constantinople in 1382 about the strigolniki.

However, the teachings of the strigolniki lived on. They spread widely in Novgorod, in Pskov, and also in Tver, where bishops Feodor Dobry and Yevfimiy Vislen came forward with support for the movement. In the early 15th century, Photius, Metropolitan of Kiev and all Russia, denounced the teachings of the strigolniki.

The strigolniki disappeared in the early 15th century due to persecution, as well as due to disagreement among the strigolniki. The last mention of the strigolniki was in 1487.

== See also ==
- Non-possessors
- Protestantism in Russia
- Spiritual Christianity

== Sources ==
- Crummey, Robert O. (6 June 2014). The Formation of Muscovy 1300 - 1613. Routledge. p. 126. ISBN 978-1-317-87200-9.
- Petrushko, Vladislav Igorevich (2019). Очерки по истории Русской церкви: с древнейших времен до середины XV в. [Essays on the history of the Russian Church: from ancient times to the middle of the 15th century.]. Moscow: PSTGU. ISBN 978-5-7429-1173-9.
