= Michael Freund (activist) =

American-born Israeli activist

Michael Freund (Hebrew: מייקל פרוינד) is an American-born Israeli political activist and non-profit executive who advocates on behalf of individuals and communities with real or alleged Jewish ancestry, including alleged descendants of the Lost tribes of Israel, crypto-Jews, hidden Jews and Jews forcibly assimilated under Communist rule, and seeks to assist them to reconnect with their real or alleged roots. With this aim in mind, he founded the organization Shavei Israel in 2004. He is also a veteran syndicated columnist and feature writer for The Jerusalem Post.

== Childhood and education ==
Freund grew up on the Upper East Side of Manhattan and attended the Ramaz School and Princeton. He spent a post-college year in Israel, studying in a yeshiva and working part-time for the concert pianist and journalist David Bar-Illan, who at the time was the Oped Editor of the Jerusalem Post. Freund returned to New York and was appointed at the age of 23 to be the speechwriter and assistant to the Israeli Ambassador to the United Nations, then went on to earn a graduate degree in business administration from Columbia University.

At the age of 16, Freund became religiously observant and he later made aliyah to Israel in 1995.

Freund is the son of Harry Freund, co-founder of the merchant-banking firm Balfour Investors and grandson of Miriam Freund-Rosenthal, a former President of Hadassah Women's Zionist Organization of America.

== Early career ==
Freund worked for a year with a short-lived NGO called Peace Watch, a right-of-center group monitoring the Oslo Accords. When Peace Watch closed, he took a job with the Sapanut Bank in Tel Aviv, work he did not enjoy. In 1996, at the age of just 28, he was appointed to serve as the Deputy Director of Communications & Policy Planning under Prime Minister Binyamin Netanyahu. After Netanyahu lost the 1999 election to Ehud Barak, Freund took a job with Ruder Finn, a Jerusalem public relations firm. At some point, he left his job in public relations to devote himself to the work of "returning lost" Jewish groups to Israel.

== Shavei Israel ==
Freund was introduced to the cause that would shape his career while working for the Prime Minister, when he read a letter from the Bnei Menashe community of eastern India, a group that claims descent from the lost Israelite tribe of Menashe. In the letter, they pleaded with the Prime Minister to enable them to make aliyah. He became involved through the bureaucracy in arranging for large numbers of Bnei Menashe to make Aliya.

Freund began to work with Rabbi Eliyahu Avichail whose organization Amishav was founded in 1975 to help "lost" Jews "return" to Israel, splitting with him to found Shavei Israel in 2002. He became the largest funder of Shavei Israel.

According to Freund, welcoming the Bnei Menashe and similar groups who sincerely wish to embrace Judaism and Jews identity is essential for the Jewish future. "Yes, we must redouble our efforts to keep Jews Jewish, but we must also open the doors and pave the way for groups such as the Bnei Menashe to return. The fact is that we need more Jews in the world, not less. Our vitality, and our future, depend on it," he has argued.

For his work with Shavei Israel, Freund has been awarded a number of prizes, including the Moskowitz Prize for Zionism and the Jerusalem Prize.
