= Dubrovin Farm =

Historic farm in Israel

Coordinates: 33°3′43.65″N 35°35′57.05″E

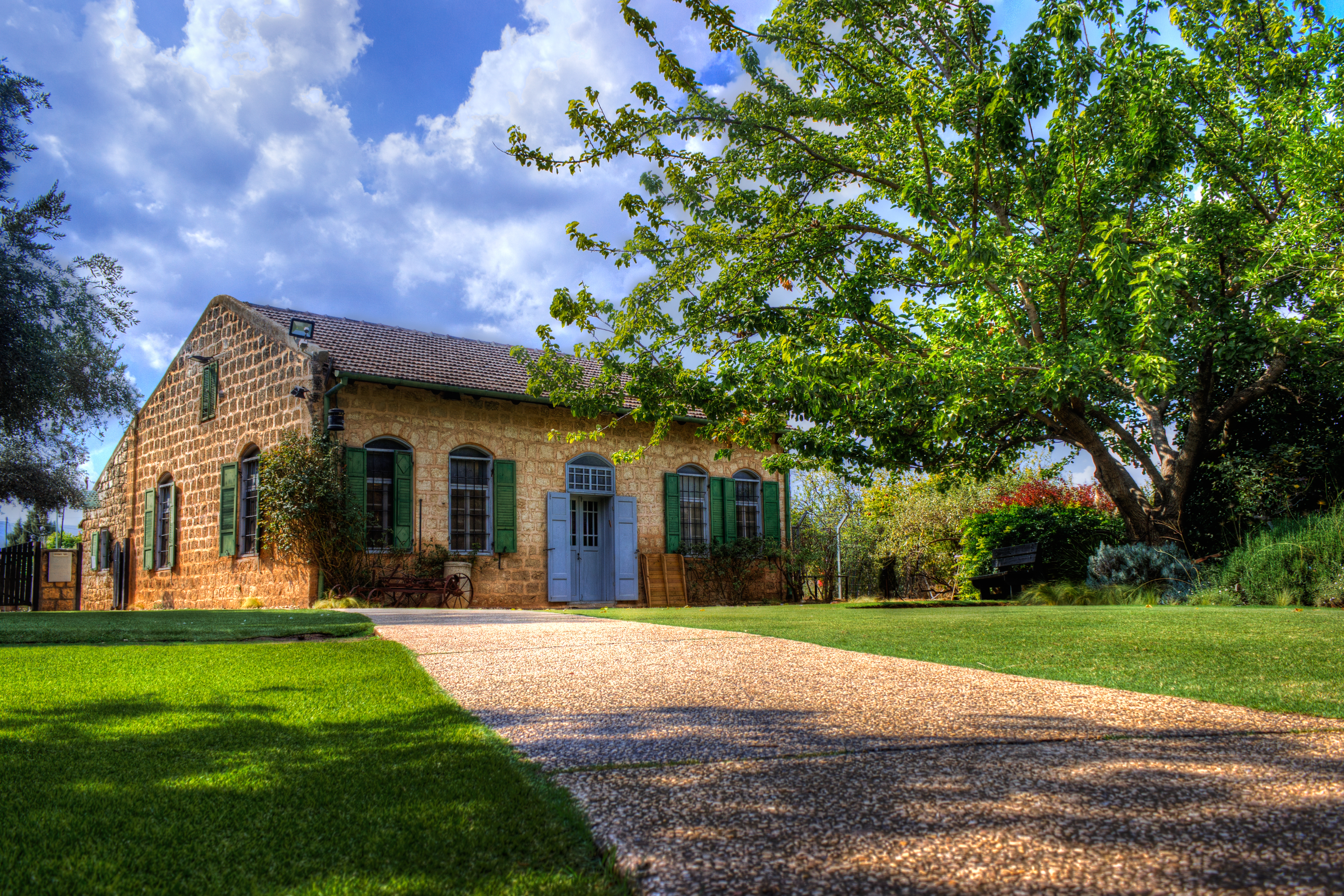
Dubrovin farm

Dubrovin Farm (Hebrew: אחוזת דוברובין) was one of the first farms in the Hulah Valley. It was established by Andrey Dubrovin (1863–1967) who moved to Ottoman Palestine with his family in 1903.

== History ==
Dubrovin left Astrakhan and settled in the north of the country near Yesod HaMa'ala. Dubrovin and his family were Subbotniks, Russian Christians who kept seventh-day Sabbath. After their conversion to Judaism, they took Hebrew names. Andrey became "Yoav", and his wife became "Rachel". The family farm, on a plot of 650 dunams, was located near a malaria-ridden swamp. Two of Dubrovin's sons and two grandchildren died of the illness. Dubrovin eventually moved most of his family to Rosh Pinna, leaving behind his eldest son, Yitzhak, to manage the buildings, fruit orchards, and gardens.

Dubrovin was granted many awards in agriculture. He died at the age of 104.

== Museum ==
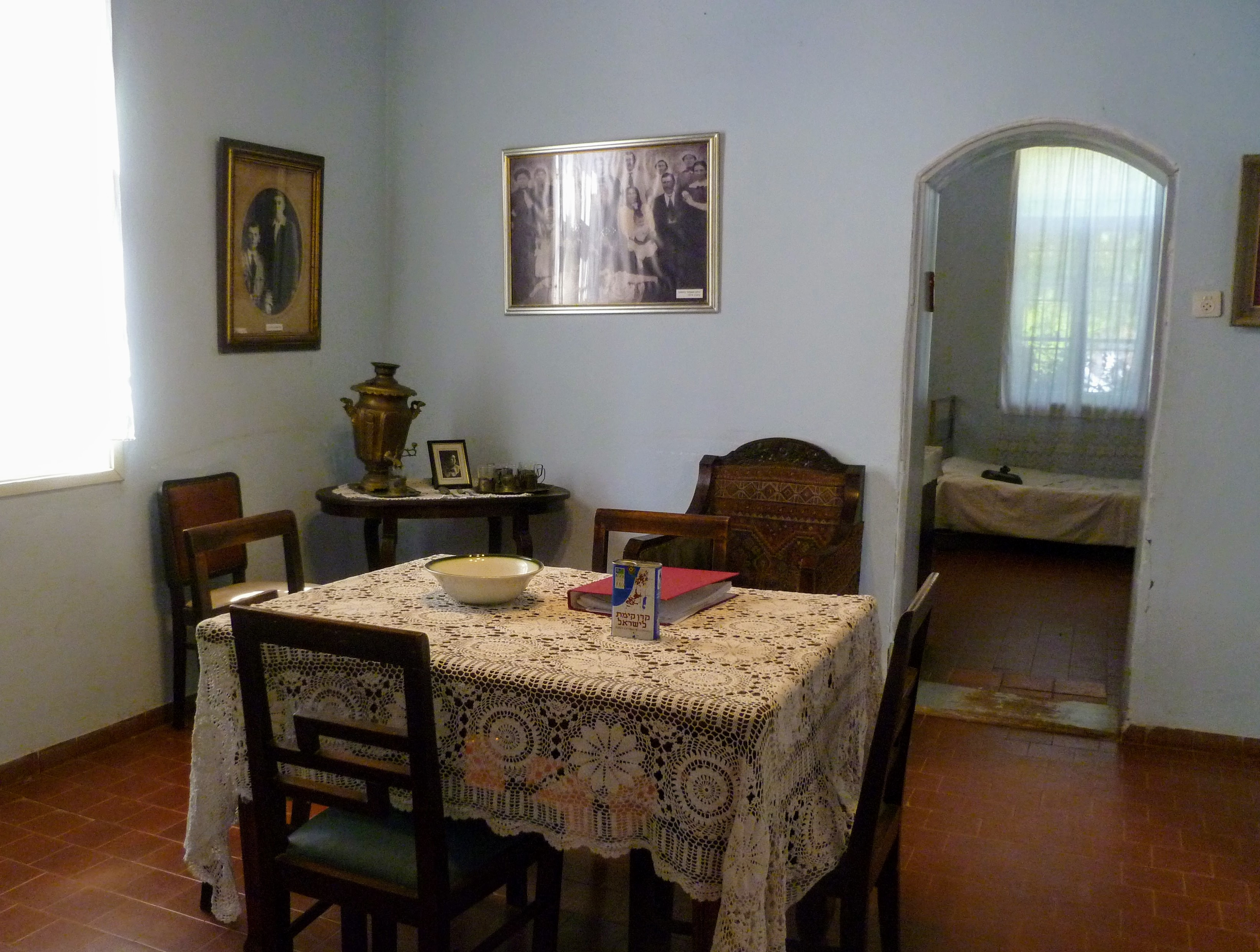
Room with period furnishings

In 1968, his son Yitzhak bequeathed the Dubrovin Estate to the Jewish National Fund and the farm was converted into a museum that commemorates the early pioneers. The museum exhibits personal possessions and furniture brought with them from 19th century Russia. On the grounds of the museum are the ruins of a synagogue dating between the 4th and 6th centuries, highlighting the historic Jewish claim to the region.

== See also ==
- Agriculture in Israel
