= Judeo-Zo =

Hebrew-influenced varieties of Tibeto-Burman languages spoken by the Bnei Menashe

- Native to: Israel, India
- Ethnicity: Bnei Menashe
- Native speakers: ~5,000 - 10.000 (ethnic community)
- Language family: Sino-Tibetan: Tibeto-Burman; Central Tibeto-Burman (?); Kuki-Chin-Naga; Kuki-Chin; Judeo-Zo
- Writing system: Latin (Mizo alphabet)

Language codes
- ISO 639-3: –
- Glottolog: None

Judeo-Zo, or Judeo-Kuki, is an umbrella term for the Hebrew-influenced varieties of Kuki-Chin languages, most notably Mizo and Thadou Kuki, spoken by the Bnei Menashe immigrant community in Israel.

== Background ==
The Bnei Menashe are a community of speakers of several closely related Tibeto-Burman languages of Northeast India who identify as descendants of one of the Lost Tribes of Israel, the Tribe of Manasseh. Since the 1990s, over five thousand residents of Mizoram and Manipur have converted to Orthodox Judaism and immigrated to Israel under the Law of Return. Most Bnei Menashe call their language "Kuki".

Many Bnei Menashe immigrants to Israel continue speaking their ethnic languages at home, especially elders who find it hard to learn Hebrew, while using Hebrew at work and when interacting with other Israelis outside the community. This leads to frequent code-mixing and an influx of Hebrew loanwords and loan translations to the Tibeto-Burman languages they brought from India.

== Characteristics ==
Loanwords are often adapted to conform to the phonology of the Bnei Menashe's ethnic languages. For example, Hebrew mishtara "police" becomes mistara because Mizo lacks the voiceless postalveolar fricative /ʃ/. Hebrew loanwords take native case suffixes and postpositions just like other Mizo nouns. Judeo-Zo is also characterized by an ongoing convergence of Mizo, Thadou Kuki, Paite, Vaiphei and other related languages and dialects since in Israel, Bnei Menashe people from different states of India live close to each other, frequently interact and intermarry.

== Sociolinguistics ==
Although the Judeo-Zo languages are primarily spoken, over a dozen books on Jewish history and Judaism in Hebrew-influenced Mizo have been published by the Bnei Menashe Israeli author Allenby Sela. Other written samples of the language include social media pages of Israeli towns with a large Bnei Menashe presence, print newsletters and the website Divrei Yehoshua run by a group of Thadou Kuki-speaking students at a yeshiva in Acre.

Younger Bnei Menashe people born in Israel are less likely to speak Judeo-Zo than their immigrant parents or grandparents. However, some express interest in institutional support for the language and classes for heritage speakers. According to a 2022 field study, some community members see symbolic value in asserting the status of Mizo and Thadou Kuki as an inseparable part of Israel's cultural and linguistic heritage by donating books in these languages to the National Library of Israel.

== Literature ==
- Shabashewitz, Dor (2025). "Judeo-Zo: a Tibeto-Burman Jewish language in the making". Journal of Modern Jewish Studies. 24 (3–4): 864–868.
