= Daniel Lhungdim =

Scholar, songwriter and poet

- T. Daniel Lhungdim
- Born: April 5, 1940; Molnom Village, Churachandpur District, Manipur, India
- Died: June 11, 1998 (aged 58)
- Occupations: Scholar, Songwriter & Poet
- Known for: His wide research on the origins of the Bnei Menashe and their connection to the lost tribes of Israel.

Daniel Lhungdim also known as T. Daniel Lhungdim (April 5, 1940 – June 11, 1998) was a scholar, songwriter and poet from the Bnei Menashe community in Manipur, India. He is known for his wide research on the origins of the Bnei Menashe and their connection to the lost tribes of Israel. His work laid the foundation for the resurgence of Jewish identity and practices among the Bnei Menashe, making him a key figure in the community’s spiritual and cultural revival.

== Early life ==
T. Daniel Lhungdim was born in 1940 in Molnom Village, Churachandpur District, Manipur, India (then part of British India). Growing up in a region deeply influenced by Christianity, Lhungdim was exposed to the Old Testament in the 1960s, which sparked his curiosity about the similarities between the customs of his people and ancient Israelite traditions. This early exposure to biblical texts ignited his lifelong passion for exploring the roots of the Bnei Menashe.

== Career ==
T. Daniel Lhungdim began his research on the Bnei Menashe and their connection to the lost tribes of Israel in the early 1960s. As a headmaster at Gandhi Memorial High School in Molnom, he balanced his teaching career with his scholarly pursuits. However, his advocacy for Judaism and his research on the lost tribe theory led to social ostracization, forcing him to leave his home and job in 1968. With the support of his kinsman, David Jamkhosem Lhungdim, he continued his research and embarked on field trips to Calcutta and Bombay, where he connected with Jewish communities and accessed valuable resources.

In 1974, T. Daniel Lhungdim, along with his associates Samuel Sumkhothang Haokip and Yosef Jangkhothang Lhanghal, published the seminal work Israel Ihiuve (We Are Israel), which became a cornerstone in the Bnei Menashe’s journey to reclaim their Jewish identity.

In October 1974, Lhungdim played a key role in the formation of the United Jews of North East India (UJNEI), an organization dedicated to promoting Jewish identity and practices among the Bnei Menashe.

On April 8, 1976, Lhungdim returned from Bombay with Jewish religious items, including a Tallith, Tefillin, a Torah scroll, and a copy of the Code of Jewish Laws, donated by Mrs. Esther, a Jewish woman from Bombay who had supported his journey. This date, which coincided with the festival of Passover, is celebrated as the birth of Judaism in the region. Later that year, on August 12, 1976, the first synagogue, Beith Shalom, was inaugurated in Churachandpur.

In October 1976, Lhungdim stepped down as President of UJNEI, handing over the presidency to Vanlalmalsawm (Vania Levy Benjamin), a Mizo-speaking Vaiphei. However, Lhungdim continued to play a key role in the organization, retaining the position of Secretary cum Khazan. The organization continued to spread Judaism in Manipur and Mizoram, attracting followers from various Christian denominations.

Notably, Lhungdim played a significant role in mentoring Gideon Rei, teaching him about Judaism and Halacha (Jewish law). Gideon Rei was then sent to Mizoram as an envoy, where he shared his knowledge and introduced Jewish practices to the Bnei Menashe community, establishing a Jewish presence in the region.

Lhungdim’s work attracted the attention of Rabbi Eliyahu Avichail, a prominent Israeli rabbi and founder of Amishav, an organization dedicated to locating the lost tribes of Israel. Rabbi Avichail’s visits to Northeast India in the 1980s validated Lhungdim’s research and helped the Bnei Menashe document their historical and cultural connections to Judaism.

In 2012, a synagogue was built in Churachandpur, Manipur. The synagogue’s Torah Ark in Manipur was later donated by Rivkah Lhungdim in memory of her husband, T. Daniel Lhungdim z”l. This act of dedication symbolizes the family’s enduring commitment to preserving Jewish traditions and honoring T. Daniel Lhungdim’s legacy.

In addition to his scholarly work, T. Daniel Lhungdim was a gifted poet and songwriter. He composed several songs that reflected the cultural and spiritual aspirations of the Bnei Menashe community. His music became a medium for expressing the community’s longing for their ancestral homeland and their connection to Judaism.

== Recognition ==
T. Daniel Lhungdim’s seminal work Israel Ihiuve (We Are Israel), co-authored with Samuel Sumkhothang Haokip and Yosef Jangkhothang Lhanghal, is considered a foundational text in the Bnei Menashe’s journey to reclaim their Jewish identity. His efforts have also been acknowledged in the book Menashe-Manmasi: The Lost Tribe of Israel by Rabbi David Lhungdim, which highlights his role in bridging the Bnei Menashe community with global Jewish traditions.

== See also ==
- Bnei Menashe
- History of the Jews in India
- Groups claiming affiliation with Israelites
- Ten Lost Tribes
