= Vysoky, Talovsky District, Voronezh Oblast =

Vysoky Высокий
- Settlement
- Location within Voronezh Oblast Location within Russia
- Coordinates: 51°04′N 40°42′E
- Country: Russia
- Region: Voronezh Oblast
- District: Talovsky District
- Time zone: UTC+3:00

Vysoky (Russian: Высокий) is a rural locality (a settlement) in Kamenno-Stepnoye Rural Settlement, Talovsky District, Voronezh Oblast, Russia. The population was 1,280 as of 2010. There are 13 streets.

Vysoky was founded in 1922 by Subbotniks. Currently about 800 Subbotniks live there. In the 21st century, the Shavei Israel organization for outreach to "lost Jews" and related communities, appointed a rabbi for the Subbotniks at Vysoky.

== Geography ==
Vysoky is located 7 km south of Talovaya (the district's administrative centre) by road. Talovaya is the nearest rural locality.
