= Lalchhanhima Sailo (rabbi) =

Indian Jewish leader (1955–2007)

Lalchhanhima Sailo (22 November 1955 – 4 April 2007) was the founder of Chhinlung Israel People Convention (CIPC) and a leader in the Bnei Menashe community in Mizoram, India. His widow, Lalthlamuani, contested in the Lok Sabha Election 2019 from the Mizoram (Lok Sabha constituency) as an Independent, but lost to C. Lalrosanga of the Mizo National Front.
