= Shavei Israel =

Israel-based Jewish organization

- Formation: 2002
- Legal status: Foundation
- Headquarters: Jerusalem, Israel
- Region served: Worldwide
- Chairman: Michael Freund

Shavei Israel (Hebrew: שבי ישראל, Those who Return to Israel) is an Israel-based Jewish organization that encourages people who claim Jewish descent or merely wish to become Jews to strengthen their connection with Israel and the Jewish people. Founded by Michael Freund in 2002, Shavei Israel locates individuals and groups who claim to be lost Jews and who claim to belong to hidden Jewish communities, and assists them with “returning” to their real or alleged roots and, sometimes, with aliyah (immigration to Israel). The organization's team is composed of academics, educators and rabbis.

== Goals and objectives ==
The Shavei Israel organization was founded to help people whose ancestors had become separated from Judaism (including alleged descendants of the Lost tribes of Israel, crypto-Jews, hidden Jews, and Jewish forcibly assimilated under Communist rule,) reconnect with the Jewish people, and in the second decade of this century also became active in helping individuals and groups of converts become part of the mainstream Jewish and Israeli communities. Shavei Israel sponsors rabbis and teachers to work with groups of "lost Jews," provide them the Jewish education and assist them in aliyah if they choose. Its affiliated rabbis are posted in Palma de Mallorca, Barcelona, Valencia, Granada, and Seville in Spain; Belmonte in northern Portugal, San Nicandro Garganico in southern Italy, Brazil, Kraków and Wrocław in Poland; and in Mizoram and Manipur in North-East India. In December 2010, Rabbi Shlomo Zelig Avrasin was sent to work with the Subbotnik Jewish communities in Russia, particularly Vysoky.

In Jerusalem, it operates Machon Miriam, a Spanish-language "conversion and return institute." Dozens of Spanish and Portuguese crypto-Jews graduate from Machon Miriam each year, and undergo formal conversion by Israel's Chief Rabbinate.

== History ==
=== Amishav ===
Amishav is an organisation distinct from Shavei Israel, which it predates and to whose creation it contributed. It was founded in 1975 by Rabbi Eliyahu Avichail and follows goals similar to those of Shavei Israel. Several years after founding Amishav, Avichail stepped aside as leader of the organisation in favour of Michael Freund, who went on to found Shavei Israel in 2002.

=== Michael Freund ===
Michael Freund, founder and director of Shavei Israel, was reared in Manhattan and immigrated to Israel 1995. In 1996 he became deputy director of communications under Prime Minister Binyamin Netanyahu. It was while serving in this post that he first learned of the Bnei Menashe when a letter arrived from the Bnei Menashe community in India beseeching the Prime Minister to enable them to make aliyah. Freund is the largest single funder of Shavei Israel.

=== Bnei Menasha of India ===
The organization supported the Bnei Menashe of India in being recognized as "descendants of Israel" by the Israeli Chief Rabbi in March 2005. Shavei Israel assisted with teachers in India. As of 2024, a total of 5,000 Bnei Menashe have made aliyah to Israel thanks to Shavei Israel. The organization assists immigrants with their integration into Israeli society.

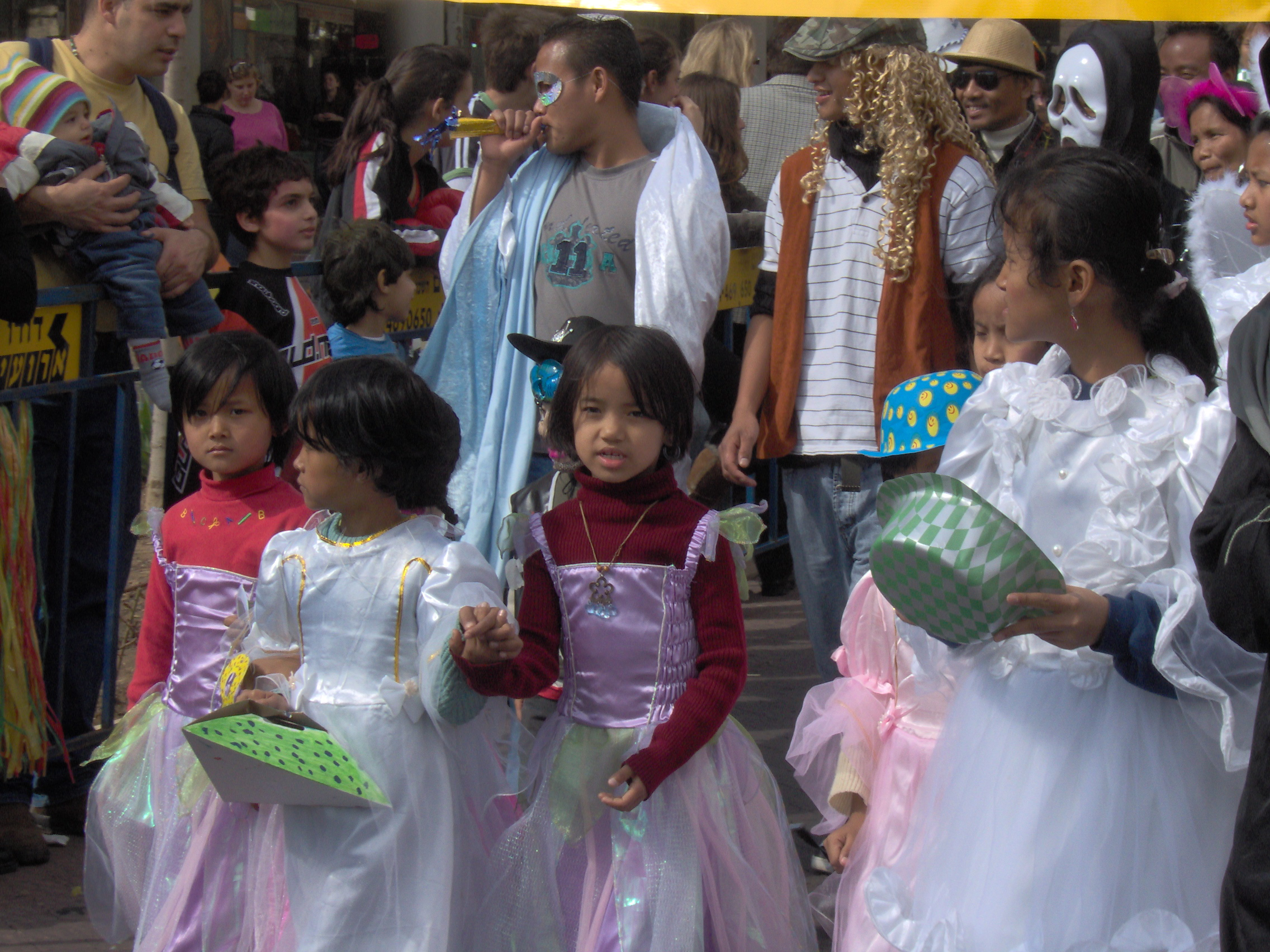
Bnei Menashe in Adloyada of Purim in Carmiel, Israel.

As part of its educational efforts, the organization has published a series of books on Judaism in a dozen languages, including Chinese, Japanese, Mizo, Spanish, French, Portuguese, Russian and German.

In March 2005 Rabbi Shlomo Amar announced the recognition of the Bnei Menashe by Israel and their possibility of immigration under the Law of Return. Those who wanted to immigrate were required to undergo a formal, full conversion as their people had been separated from Judaism for so long. In June 2005 the Bnei Menashe completed the construction of a mikvah in Mizoram under the supervision of Israeli rabbis to start the process of conversion to Judaism.

Freund supported the resettlement of 218 Bnei Menashe in Upper Nazareth and Karmiel in November 2005. A total of 1,700 Bnei Menashe moved to Israel, mainly settlements in the West Bank and Gaza Strip (until the disengagement in 2005).

=== Latin America ===
In 2013 Freund learned of a large groups of Latin Americans from Christian families who were converting to orthodox Judaism, thousands or tens of thousands of whom wanted to immigrate to Israel. Freund began working with Israeli authorities and with the Latin American converts, and the first, small group of converts moved to Israel in June 2015.

== Criticism ==
Shavei has been criticised by some for its work to assist people seeking to undergo an Orthodox conversion to Judaism.

The mass conversion of Mizo-Kuki peoples aroused the concern of the Indian government, as it prohibits proselytizing. In November 2005 Israel recalled the Rabbinic Court teams which had been preparing several hundred Bnei Menashe for conversion to calm the concerns of the Indian government. At the time, some Hindu organisations complained that the government had paid more attention to the complaints of Christian missionaries working in India than to their own complaints about Jewish missionaries proselytising in traditionally Hindu communities.

After suspending the issuance of visas to Bnei Menashe for a few years, in January 2010 the Israeli government announced that the remaining 7,200 Bnei Menashe could make aliyah within a period of 1–2 years after completing conversion at facilities in Nepal. This allowed them to avoid problems with India.

== See also ==
- Aliyah
- Gathering of Israel
- Jewish fundamentalism
- Orthodox Judaism outreach
