= Sinlung =

Origin of the Zo peoples

Sinlung (origin: Hmar; Chhinlung in Mizo; Chinlung in Chin; Khul in Thadou and Paite) is the supposed 'ancestral origin' of the Hmar people (or the larger Mizo people), the Chin people, etc. The exact location is unknown, but it is believed to be somewhere in modern-day China. Several narratives of Sinlung have been 'enshrined' largely in Hmar folklore, such as the Sikpui Hla which talks about a supposed ancestral migration.

== Etymology ==
Several scholars agree that 'Sinlung' literally translates to 'sin' as 'lid' and 'lung' as 'stone' (in the Hmar language). Therefore, there is an assumption that Sinlung refers to a 'cave with a stone lid.' There are several suppositions as to how the name Sinlung is derived. Firstly, it is suggested that Sinlung may have been the name of a king, though scholars have found no plausible evidence to support this claim. Secondly, it is proposed that Sinlung refers to a literal cave, a view that has found some agreement among scholars. Regardless, there remains no concrete consensus to this day.

== Possible insights ==
=== Location ===
According to historian and anthropologist, B. Lalthangliana, the Mizos who were Tibeto-Burman most likely lived in the Tao valley in Gansu province or northeast of Tibet. The reason for the Tibeto-Burmans leaving the valley is commonly attributed to the constant wars and disturbances of the Chinese kingdoms. J Guit argues that Chhinlung, as a cavern, is most likely a place the Zo people passed through during their migrations into their current settlements rather than originated from.

=== Eponym ===
According to Lalbiakthanga, Chin Lung was the name of a king or chief. He purports that Chin Lung was the son of Qin Shi Huang who built the Great Wall. It was proposed that in rebellion to his father, one of the princes left the kingdom and settled in Burma. However, such a theory is only seen as a possible legend with little historicity.

== Usage of the term ==
- Sinlung Hills Council in Mizoram.
- Sinlung. A book published by the Hmar Literature Society for high school (and higher secondary) students.
- Sinlung Royal Riders.

== Sources ==
- Lalthangliana, B. (1975). History of Mizo In Burma. Mandalay: Arts and Science University Mandalay.
- Verghese, C.G.; Thanzawna, R.L. (1997). A History of the Mizos. New Delhi: Vikas Publishing House.
- Haokip, D.L. (2014). "The Tales Telling the Location of Sinlung-Khul:Origin of the Chin-Kuki-Mizo Zoumi". In Sudhir, H. (ed.). Tribal History of North-East India: Essay in Honour of Professor Lal Dena. New Delhi: Concept Publishing Company. ISBN 978-93-5125-099-9.
