= Subbotniks =

Russian religious movements

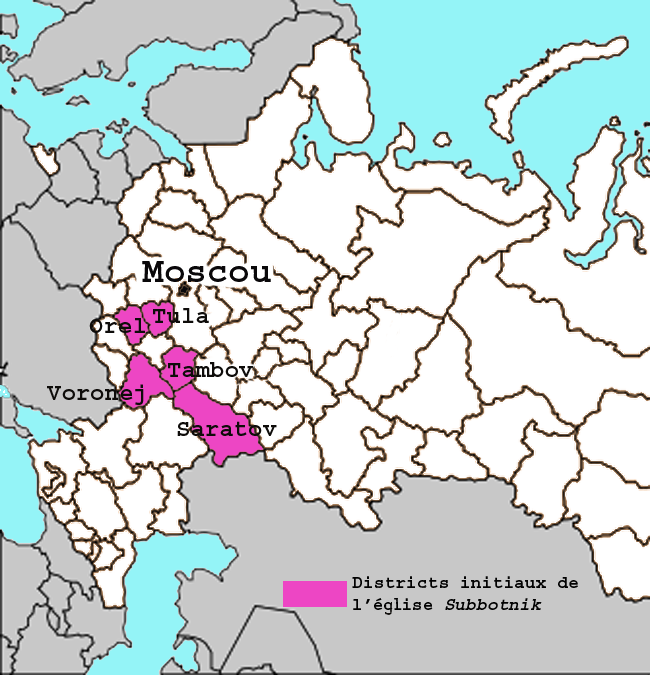
Graph showing the location of Subbotnik populations in Russia in the early 19th century

Subbotniks (Russian: Субботники, IPA: [sʊˈbotnʲɪkʲɪ], "Sabbatarians") is a common name for adherents of Russian religious movements that split from Sabbatarian sects in the late 18th century.

The majority of Subbotniks were converts to Rabbinic or Karaite Judaism from Christianity. Other groups included Judaizing Christians and Spiritual Christians.

There are three main groups of people described as Subbotniks:

- Judaizing Talmudists: Subbotnik converts to Rabbinic Judaism, also described as "Gery" (Russian: Геры), "Talmudisty" (Russian: Субботники-Талмудисты), or "Shaposhniki".
- Karaimites or Karaite Subbotniks (Russian: Субботники-Караимиты): also described as "Russian Karaites" (Russian: Русские Караимы), considering themselves as adherents of Karaite Judaism. They recognize only the scriptural authority of the Torah and reject the Talmud; however, it has been reported that they do not practice circumcision.
- Subbotnik Molokans (Russian: Молокане-субботники): in contrast to the other Subbotnik sects, they recognize the Gospel, but also practice some of the rules and precepts of the Old Testament.

A 1912 religious census in Russia recorded 12,305 "Judaizing Talmudists", and 4,092 "Russian Karaites", and 8,412 Subbotniks who "had fallen away from Orthodoxy".

On the whole, the Subbotniks probably differed little from other Judaizing societies in their early years. They first appeared toward the end of the 18th century during the reign of Catherine the Great. According to official reports of the Russian Empire, most of the sect's followers circumcised their boys, believed in a unitary God rather than in the Christian Trinity, accepted only the Hebrew Bible, and observed the Sabbath on Saturday rather than on Sunday as in Christian practice (and hence were called "sabbatarians"). There were variations among their beliefs in relation to Jesus, the Second Coming, and other elements of Eastern Orthodox doctrine.

Prior to the First Partition of Poland in 1772, few Jews had settled in the Russian Empire. The Subbotniks were originally Christian peasants of the Russian Orthodox Church. During the reign of Catherine the Great (1729–1796), they adopted elements of Mosaic Law from the Old Testament and were known as "Sabbatarians", part of the Spiritual Christianity movement.

Subbotnik families settled in the Holy Land at the time part of the Ottoman Empire, in the 1880s, as part of the Zionist First Aliyah in order to escape oppression in the Russian Empire and later mostly intermarried with Jews. Examples of Israeli Jews descended from Subbotniks include Alexander Zaïd; Major-General Alik Ron; and former Israeli foreign minister, prime minister, and general Ariel Sharon.

== History ==
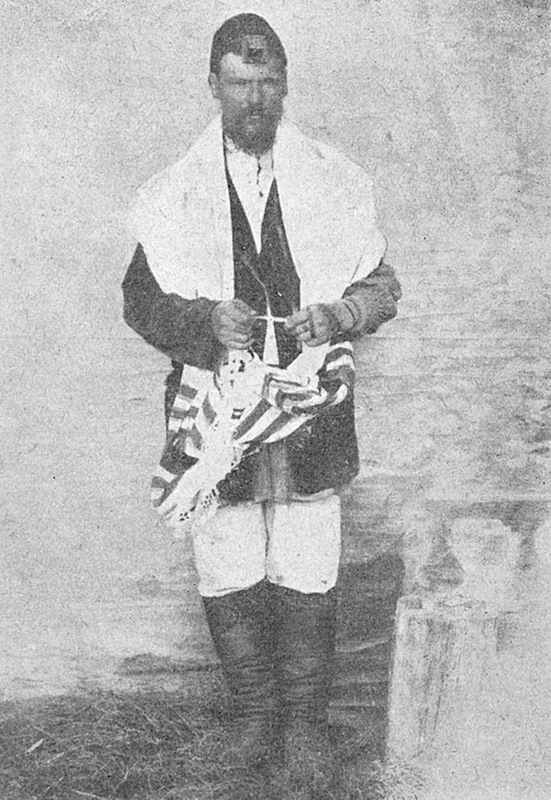
A Subbotnik, early 20th century

Subbotniks, meaning sabbatarians for their observance of the Sabbath on Saturday, as in the Hebrew Bible, rather than on Sunday, arose as part of the Spiritual Christian movement in the 18th century. Imperial Russian officials and Orthodox clergy considered the Subbotniks to be heretical to Russian Orthodox religion, and tried to suppress their sects and other Judaizers. They also emphasized individual interpretation of the law rather than accepting the Talmud or clergy. The Subbotniks concealed their religious beliefs and rites from Orthodox Christians. The Russian government eventually deported the Subbotniks, isolating them from Orthodox Christians and Jews.

The Subbotniks observed the Sabbath on Saturday, and were also known as sabbatarians. They avoided work and tried to avoid discussing worldly affairs. Apart from practicing circumcision of boys, many began to slaughter their food animals according to the laws of shechita when they could learn the necessary rules. Some clandestinely used phylacteries, tzitzit (ritual tassels), and mezuzot (doorpost markings), and prayed in private houses of prayer. As their practice deepened, some acquired Jewish "siddur" prayer books with Russian translation for their prayers. The hazzan (cantor) read the prayers aloud, and the congregants prayed silently; during prayers a solemn silence was observed throughout the house.

According to the testimony, private and official, of all those who studied their mode of life in tsarist times, the Subbotniks were remarkably industrious; reading and writing, hospitable, not given to drunkenness, poverty, or prostitution. Up to 1820 the Subbotniks lived for the most part in the governments of Voronezh, Oryol, Moscow, Tula, and Saratov. After that year, the government deported those who openly acknowledged their membership in the sect to the foothills of the Caucasus, to Transcaucasia, and to the Siberian governments of Irkutsk, Tobolsk, and Yeniseisk. In 1912, the government's Interior Ministry recorded 8,412 Subbotniks; 12,305 Judaizing Talmudists; and 4,092 Russian Karaites.

=== Under Alexander I and Nicholas I ===
Under Alexander I's policies of general tolerance, the Subbotniks enjoyed a great deal of freedom. But the Russian clergy opposed them and killed about 100 Subbotniks and their spiritual leaders in Mogilev, in present-day Belarus, including the former archbishop Romantzov. In addition, Romantzov's young son was tortured with red-hot irons before being burned at the stake. The Subbotniks came to an agreement with the Russian Orthodox priests and succeeded in gaining a measure of peace for a period. To compensate the Church for any loss of finances due to the Subbotniks leaving their congregations, the members of the sect undertook to pay the Church the usual fee of two Russian rubles for every birth and three rubles for every marriage. The tsar permitted the Subbotniks to profess their faith openly, but prohibited them from hiring rabbis or proselytizing among Christians.

Under Nicholas I, the Subbotniks began to feel restless. Some wanted to embrace Judaism and traveled into the Pale of Settlement in order to learn more about Judaism. Upon learning this, the Russian government sent a number of priests to the Subbotniks to try to persuade them to return to Russian Orthodoxy. When the priests did not meet with any appreciable success, the government decided to suppress the Subbotniks with force. In 1826, the government decided to deport those who lived openly as Subbotniks to internal exile in the above-mentioned regions in the Caucasus, Transcaucasia, and Siberia. At the same time, it prohibited Jews and members of the Russian Orthodox Church from settling among any Subbotniks.

=== Zionism and settlement in Ottoman Palestine ===
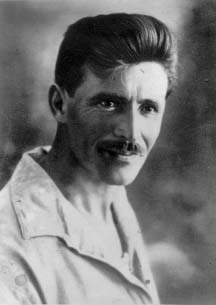
Alexander Zaïd

Subbotnik communities were among early supporters of Zionism. During the First Aliyah at the end of the 19th century, thousands of Subbotniks settled in Ottoman Palestine to escape religious persecution due to their differences with the Russian Orthodox Church. Some Subbotniks had immigrated to Ottoman Palestine even prior to the First Aliyah.

The Subbotniks faced hurdles when intermarrying into the wider Jewish population, as they were not considered Jews according to halakha. They were noted for often being more religiously observant than the mostly secular Jewish Zionist population in that period. They Hebraized their surnames to assimilate. Within a short period, the descendants of Subbotnik Jews who arrived in Ottoman Palestine in the late 19th century had completely blended and inter-married into the wider Jewish population of Palestine.

=== Soviet period ===
==== Holocaust ====
Subbotniks in Nazi-occupied areas of Ukraine were killed by SS Einsatzgruppen troops and local Ukrainian collaborators due to their Jewish self-identity. They were relatively recent migrants to Ukraine from areas of Voronezh and considered outsiders by the peasants, who noted their practice of some Jewish customs. During the Holocaust, Nazis killed thousands of Subbotniks. By contrast, they did not attack Crimean Karaites, accepting the state's records that they were ethnic Tatars (or Khazars).

==== Post-WW2 ====
Following their massacre in the Holocaust, the Subbotniks came to have an increasingly nationalist self-identification as Jews. However, after the War, the Soviet government ceased to recognize the "Subbotnik" as a legal ethnic category. They counted these people as a subset of the ethnic Russian population.

Between 1973 and 1991, the Subbotniks of Ilyinka in Voronezh Oblast emigrated to Israel.

=== Post-Soviet era ===
After the fall of the Soviet Union, a few thousand Subbotniks left Russia for Israel. This coincided with the 1990s Post-Soviet aliyah to Israel of more than a million Russian Jews and members of their immediate families. Since that period, Subbotniks remaining in Russia have encountered status-related problems. In the 21st century, the Shavei Israel organization for outreach to "lost Jews" and related communities, appointed a rabbi for the Subbotniks at Vysoky in Voronezh Oblast. The objective of teaching them about and facilitating their formal conversion to Orthodox Judaism would make them eligible for aliyah to Israel.

== State of Israel ==
In the early 21st century, the issue arose of the Jewish identity of some members of Moshav Yitav, located in the Jordan Valley north of Jericho in the West Bank, who were Subbotniks, immigrants from former Soviet Georgia. In 2004, the Sephardic Chief Rabbi of Israel Shlomo Amar ruled the Subbotniks were not defined as Jewish and would have to undergo an Orthodox conversion. The Interior Ministry classified the Subbotniks as a Christian sect and ineligible for aliyah to Israel, because no one knew if their ancestors had formally converted to Judaism. The ruling was abolished in 2014, with an attempt by the Interior Ministry to allow remaining Subbotnik families to immigrate to Israel.

== Statistics ==
It has been difficult to estimate the exact number of Subbotniks in Russia at any given time. The discrepancies between government statistics and the membership have varied widely. Official data from tsarist times placed the membership of the sect at several thousand. The writer E. Deinard, who was in personal contact with the Subbotniks, said in 1887 there were 2,500,000. Deinard may have included in his figures all of the Judaizing sects, and not just the Subbotniks, as this estimate is not supported by any other historians. Apart from their religious rites, the Subbotniks were generally indistinguishable from Russian Orthodox or secular Russians in terms of dress and lifestyle.

== Subbotnik Karaites ==
=== Distribution ===
Besides Tambov, Subbotnik Karaites also lived in Saratov Oblast, Astrakhan Oblast, Volgograd Oblast, Stavropol Krai, Samara Oblast, Khakassia, Irkutsk Oblast along the Molochna River in Novorossiya, in Krasnodar Krai, Armenia, and Azerbaijan and along the Russian Empire's borders with Iran. While not all statistics for all provinces are readily available, there are more than 2500 in Privolnoye, Azerbaijan, alone.

=== Characteristics ===
From 1870 they began to use the "Everyday Prayers for Karaites" by Abraham Firkovich (1870, Vilnius) for their liturgy, which in 1882 they were allowed to publish in Russian as "Порядок молитв для караимов" (tr. Poryadok molitv dlya karaimov). It was based on the Siddur Tefillot keMinhag haKaraim by Isaak ben Solomon Ickowicz. The Subbotnik Karaites had contacts with the Crimean Karaites, who, to a degree, exemplified for them "a Jewish model to be imitated", "were occasional and never formally arranged since, in particular, normative Karaism denied the acceptance of proselytes and regarded the very existence of a community of Karaites of non-Jewish origin senseless."

== Distribution ==
Due to tsarist persecution, Subbotniks spread out creating a wide diaspora, living since the 19th century in the following countries and regions:

- Armenia
- Australia
- Azerbaijan
- Belarus
- Bulgaria (Southern Dobruja region)
- France
- Georgia
- Iran
- Israel
- Moldova
- Poland
- Romania (Northern Dobruja region)
- Russia
- Ukraine
- Uruguay
- United States
- Uzbekistan

== Notable people ==
- Andrey Dubrovin (1863–1967), farmer and Zionist pioneer
- Alexander Zaïd (1886–1938), founding member of two Jewish self-defense militias.

== See also ==
- Christianity and Judaism
- Dönmeh
- Frankism
- Ger toshav
- Righteous gentiles
- Hasidism
- Heresy of the Judaizers
- Judaizers
- Khazars
- Messianic Judaism
- Noahides
- Proselyte
- Righteous among the Nations
- San Nicandro Jews
- Spiritual Christianity
- Szekler Sabbatarians

== Bibliography ==
- Astyrev, N. "Subbotniki v Rossii i Sibiri". In Syeverny Vyestnik, 1891, No. 6.
- Dinard, E. In Ha-Meliẓ, 1887, No. 75.
- Dynner, Glenn (2011). Holy Dissent: Jewish and Christian Mystics in Eastern Europe. Wayne State University Press. ISBN 9780814335970.
- Kostomarov, Russkaya Istoriya, vol. i.
- Univ. Isr. 1854, p. 396.
