= Fyodor Kuritsyn =

Russian statesman (died after 1500)

Ivan III sends Kuritsyn to Hungary with the Hungarian ambassador (1482), from the Illustrated Chronicle of Ivan the Terrible

Fyodor or Feodor Vasilyevich Kuritsyn (Russian: Фёдор Васильевич Курицын; died after 1500) was a Russian statesman, philosopher and poet. He served as a diplomat to Hungary during the reign of Ivan III.

== Biography ==
As a government official and diplomat, Kuritsyn exerted great influence on Russian foreign policy during the reign of Ivan III. In 1482, he was sent to the Hungarian king Matthias Corvinus to conclude an anti-Polish alliance. In 1494, Kuritsyn was sent to Lithuania for the same purpose. He took part in many negotiations with foreign statesmen in Moscow.

In 1485, after returning from Hungary, Kuritsyn created a club, which later would be considered heretical. He was against monasteries and monasticism, expressed ideas about freedom of human will ("autocracy of the soul"), which he would interpret in a much broader sense than it was allowed by Orthodox theology. Many of the adherents of the so-called Judaizers had centered around Kuritsyn, and this movement spread to the court of Ivan.

Kuritsyn's name was last mentioned in 1500, when Ivan III gradually changed his attitude towards heretics thanks to the hegumen Joseph Volotsky, who had been Kuritsyn's staunch opponent. Ivan's leniency gave way to persecution, which would put an end to activities of Kuritsyn's club. However, he spared Kuritsyn due to Volotsky's obvious exaggerations in his accusations.

== Works ==
Kuritsyn authored numerous literary works, of which two survive to this day—a philosophical poem titled The Laodicean Missive, as well as the poetic novel The Legend of the Voijevoda Dracula. The Laodicean Missive may have used some aspects of Jewish mysticism known as Kabbalah.

== Sources ==
- "Курицыны" . Brockhaus and Efron Encyclopedic Dictionary (in Russian). 1906.
- Crummey, Robert O. (6 June 2014) [1987]. The Formation of Muscovy 1300–1613. Routledge. ISBN 978-1-317-87200-9.
- Langer, Lawrence N. (15 September 2021). Historical Dictionary of Medieval Russia. Rowman & Littlefield. pp. 93–95. ISBN 978-1-5381-1942-6.
