= Syriac Alexander Legend =

Christianized Syriac account of Alexander the Great's exploits

The Syriac Alexander Legend (Neṣḥānā d-Aleksandrōs Syriac: ܢܨܚܢܐ) is a 6th or 7th century work of Christian Syriac literature concerning the legends of Alexander the Great.

In the beginning of the story, Alexander declares his intentions to explore the ends of the world, and he promises to God that he will rule the world. He gathers an army in Egypt, and then travels to the Fetid Sea but is not able to cross it. Instead, he finds the "window of heaven" that allows him to travel from the place where the sun sets to where it rises. In the region of the sunrise, he travels to Central Asia and sets up camp near a mountain pass, only to be informed that he is now in the domain of the Persian emperor. He learns that beyond the mountain pass are barbarian tribes, with Gog and Magog as two of their kings. Deciding to seal up their entryway through the mountains, he tasks his blacksmiths and metalworkers from Egypt to construct an iron and bronze wall. He then reveals two prophecies about when the barbarians will penetrate the wall and bring about a world war, out of which the Romans will emerge victorious. Later, the Persian emperor learns of Alexander's presence. He advances an army against Alexander, but the advance is miraculously revealed to Alexander, who then proceeds to defeat the emperor despite his numerical disadvantage. After victory, Alexander travels and prays in Jerusalem, and finally, returns to Alexandria.

The Syriac Alexander Legend is the first narrative to weave together many motifs that previously existed across different stories, including the Gates of Alexander, the apocalypse, and the barbarian tribes of Gog and Magog. It went on to exert a major influence on apocalyptic literature written after it, especially that in the Syriac tradition, such as the Apocalypse of Pseudo-Methodius and the Apocalypse of Pseudo-Ephraem. The portrayal of Alexander in the Legend is also believed to lie behind the character known as Dhu al-Qarnayn (or the "Two-Horned One") in the Quran.

Other names that the text goes by includes "The Victory of Alexander", the "Christian Syriac Alexander Legend" (or CSAL for short), or in the 1889 Budge edition, it appears under the title "A Christian Legend concerning Alexander". Other legendary works on Alexander in the Syriac language include the Syriac Alexander Romance (which it shows up with in its manuscripts, despite no original relationship between the texts) and the Song of Alexander.

== Composition ==
=== Date ===
The old consensus, since Theodor Nöldeke, placed the provenance of the Syriac Alexander Legend in north Mesopotamia in around 629–630 CE, shortly after Heraclius defeated the Sasanians. In recent years, many historians have conducted a reappraisal of the date of the text. The basis of the original dating has been a vaticinium ex eventu prophecy, whose termination was placed around the year 630. One reanalysis of the internal chronology of the text has placed the termination of this prophecy instead in 614. A more common approach in recent years has been to re-emphasize a second, earlier vaticinium ex eventu prophecy which describes an event that occurred in 514/5. Several scholars have since argued that the text was originally composed in the aftermath of this event, from the early-to-mid-6th century CE (perhaps during the reign of the Byzantine emperor Justinian I), and that the second and later prophecy was a hastily made interpolation in the text in the context of the Byzantine–Sasanian War of 602–628, potentially to propagandistically reignite its utility for the current war situation.

Aside from the written date of the text, others have also argued that the contents of the legend likely circulated orally for several decades prior to its being placed into a written form.

The text of the legend is attached to Syriac versions of the Alexander Romance, and is preserved in six late manuscripts, the oldest of which was copied in 1708–1709. The slightly later Song of Alexander survives in five manuscripts, the oldest of which was copied in the 9th century CE.

=== Sources ===
A number of historians believe that the Legend is a substantially reshaped version of the earlier Alexander Romance. Others consider the two to be independent works.

== Plot ==
The plot of the Legend can be divided into three main sections:

- First section. Alexander summons his council to declare his desire to explore the outermost part of the world. He is warned of the problems that he will encounter, but decides to go through anyways. He promises to God that he will bring the world into his dominion and gathers an army to Egypt where he enrolls blacksmiths and metalworkers. He then travels to the Fetid Sea but finds it impossible to cross. He finds the "window of heaven" which allows him to travel from the place where the sun sets to the place where the sun rises.
- Second section. Alexander travels from the place of the sunset to sunrise and the section begins when he is in the region of the sunrise, in the Far East. From there, he travels westward to Mesopotamia and the Caucasus. He sets up camp at a mountain but a local delegation of elders meets him to inform him that the region he has encamped at is under the dominion of Tūbarlaq, the Persian emperor. In dialogue with the elders, he asks them about what lies beyond the mountain. They describe to him the barbarian tribe known as the Huns, of whom Gog and Magog are listed as two of the kings. Deciding to seal away these tribes, he uses the help of the blacksmiths and metalworkers he had recruited back in Egypt to construct a wall between two mountains made of iron and bronze. After the construction is complete, Alexander relays a prophecy of two future dates, set at 826 AG (514–515 AD) and 940 AG (628– 629 AD), during which the Huns will break through the gate and initiate the apocalypse (end of the world). A world conflict will arise out of which the Romans will emerge victorious and conquer the entire world.
- Third section. The locals inform Tūbarlaq about where Alexander has set camp. Tūbarlaq summons an army and advances on Alexander; however, by divine intervention, Alexander is informed of Tūbarlaq's approach. Alexander prays to God for victory in spite of his vast numerical disadvantage, as his soldiers number one tenth of Tūbarlaq's. His prayer is granted, and during the battle God plays an active part in defeating the Persians. Tūbarlaq's astrologers prophesy that in the end of the world, Persia will be destroyed and the Romans will conquer. After his victory, Alexander travels to Jerusalem where he prays before God. Finally, he returns to Alexandria.

== Themes ==
=== Alexander's gate ===
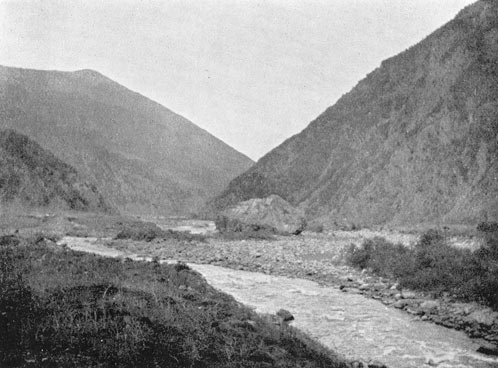
The Darial Gorge before 1906

In the Legend, the Gates of Alexander are an apocalyptic barrier built by Alexander in the Caucasus to keep out the nations of Gog and Magog. This development was inspired by some elements of the historical context of the time, including dread of the northern hordes, a variety of Persian fortifications meant to seal off the movement of steppe nomads, and eschatological thinking and attitudes of the time. At its outset, the Syriac Alexander Legend (otherwise known as the Neshana) records Alexander constructing a wall of iron to prevent an invasion of the Huns that would result in the plunder of peoples and countries. Alexander commanded that the gate should be constructed out of iron and bronze, for which he recruited three thousand blacksmiths to work the latter and three thousand other men for the former. However, it was believed that the barbarian tribes would break through during the apocalypse. The dimensions and features of the gate are described in detail, and Alexander was said to have placed an inscription on it which reads "The Huns will come forth and subdue the countries of the Romans and Persians; they will shoot arrows with armagest and will return and enter their country. Moreover, I wrote that (at) the end of eight hundred and twenty six years, the Huns would come forth by the narrow road..." (the inscription goes on for several more pages). This prophecy whereby the Huns break through the gates is linked to the invasion of the Sabir people in 515 AD as Syriac texts would use the Seleucid calendrical system which began in 1 October, 312 BCE; by subtracting 311 or 312, a date of 514/5 is arrived at, representing a vaticinium ex eventu. A second prophecy of an incursion appears for 940 SE, pinpointing to 628/9 AD and corresponds with the invasion of Armenia by the Turkic Khazars (not to be confused with a reference to the Turks which may not occur in this type of literature until the ninth century), although this may have been an interpolation that was made into the text during the reign of Heraclius to update the narrative for a contemporary political situation.

The description of the Gates of Alexander in the Syriac Alexander Legend influenced most subsequent Syriac literature describing these events.

=== Alexander's horns ===
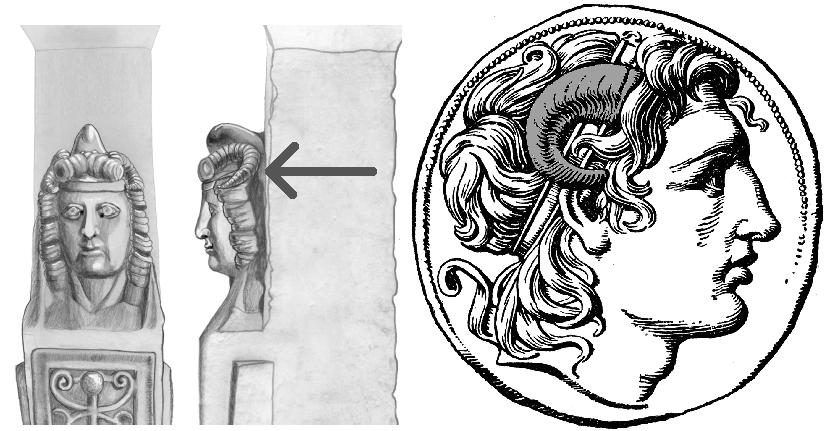
Horned bust of Alexander from Cyprus (left); horned coin portrait of Alexander (right)

The horns of Alexander are described twice in the Legend. The first is during a prayer by Alexander's:

King Alexander bowed, and worshipping said: “Oh God, master of kings and judges, you who raise up kings and dismiss their power, I perceive with my mind that you made me great among all kings, and that you caused horns to grow on my head, so that I may gore with them the kingdoms of the world. Give me the power from the heavens of your sanctity so that I may receive strength greater than the kingdoms of the world, and I will humiliate them and glorify your name forever, oh Lord!

The second reference occurs towards the end of the text as God speaks to Alexander and tells him that he gave him two horns to use them as a weapon against other worldly kingdoms:

I made you great among all kings, and I caused horns of iron to grow on your head, so that you may gore with them the kingdoms of the world.

The two-horned imagery of the Syriac Alexander Legend draws together elements from the Peshitta of 1 Kings 22:11/2 Chronicles 18:10, Micah 4:13, and the two-horned ram in Daniel 8. In particular, the term used in the Legend for two horns, qrntʾ, is likely to be inspired by the appearance of qrntʾ in the Peshitta (standard Syriac translation) of Daniel 8:3.

=== Gog and Magog ===
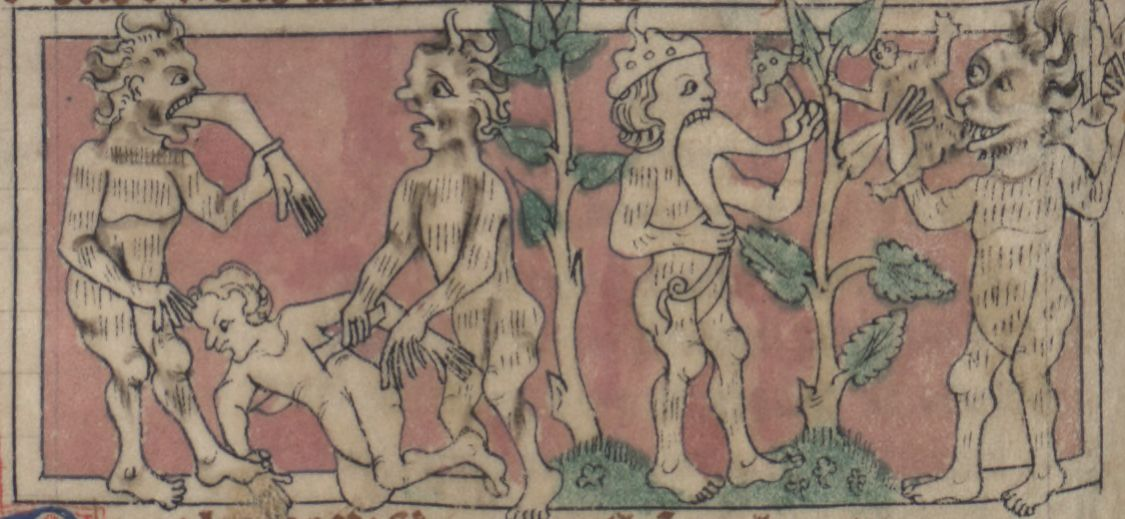
Gog and Magog consuming humans. —Thomas de Kent's Roman de toute chevalerie, Paris manuscript, 14th century

In the Legend, Gog and Magog are kings of barbarian Hunnish tribes (Note: Also called Christian Legend concerning Alexander, ed. tr. by E. A. Wallis Budge. It has a long full-title, which in shorthand reads "An exploit of Alexander.. how.. he made a gate of iron, and shut it [against] the Huns".) that play a role in the apocalypse. The Legend is the first text to give this role to Gog and Magog. The Legend claims that Alexander carved prophecies on the face of the Gate, marking a date for when these Huns, consisting of 24 nations, will breach the Gate and subjugate the greater part of the world. (Note: The first invasion, prophesied to occur 826 years after Alexander predicted, has been worked out to fall on 1 October 514; the second invasion on A.D. 629 (Boyle 1979, p. 124).)

== Cosmography ==
The Syriac Alexander Legend contains a notable discussion of cosmography among works in the popular domain of literature from Late Antiquity, as opposed to more systematic theological works or homiletic reflections on the Genesis creation narrative. The opening of the text includes Alexander contemplating what he will discover about how the world is shaped if he succeeds in travelling through it:

Alexander told them: “This thought came to my mind, and I am seized by amazement: what is the extent of the earth and what the height of heaven? How many are the countries of the other kings? And on what are heavens based? Are perhaps clouds and winds that lift them up? Or are rather columns of fire rising from the earth that support the skies so that they do not move? Or are they hung to God’s nod and do not fall? And this is what I desire to go and see: upon what the heavens lie and what surrounds the whole creation.”

Alexander travels to the ends of the earth, where he finds Oceanus, an unpassable ocean that circles the entire world. Alexander also observes the path of the sun: he discovers that the sun rises from one area of the earth and goes up until it enters the firmament through a window. The people who live near the sun's rising are forced to take shelter due to its heat. When the sun sets, it passes back into the earthly world through another celestial window, leaving the visible sky, after which it prostrates to God. The cycle is then repeated as the sun begins to return to the rising point. Alexander then discovers the Northern Mountains, which contain an ominous people that he seals away with a gate.

The cosmography of the Syriac Alexander Legend is evidently inspired by the Epic of Gilgamesh, such as when Gilgamesh reaches the ocean circling the earth, but in the Gilgamesh story, the ocean is traversable. The Legend's cosmography also closely follows what is seen in the Babylonian Map of the World. The text also aligns with a Mesopotamian cosmography in its description of the path of the sun: as the sun sets in the west, it passes through a gateway in the firmament, cycles to the other side of the earth, and rises in the east in its passage through another celestial gateway. Alexander, like Gilgamesh, follows the path of the sun during his journey. Gilgamesh's journey takes him to a great cosmic mountain Mashu. Likewise, Alexander reaches a cosmic mountain known as Musas.

== Alexander and Dhu al-Qarnayn ==
In the late 19th century, Theodor Noldeke proposed that traditions of the Syriac Alexander Legend played a role in the formation of traditions about an enigmatic figure named Dhu al-Qarnayn ("The Two-Horned One") in the Quran. Forgotten, this thesis would be revived in the field of Quranic studies by Kevin van Bladel in a 2008 article. Since then, the thesis has been further developed by publications from Tommaso Tesei. Some of the main combination of motifs that have been related between the two texts involve an apocalyptic incursion, Gog and Magog, and Gates of Alexander. According to Marianna Klar, this thesis overemphasizes the similarities and downplays the differences. She argues that a direct relation between the two traditions has been assumed but not yet established. In turn, Tesei has argued that the narrative differences are minor compared to the coherence between the texts, and that a direct relationship is bolstered by the presence of many elements unique to the Legend in the account of Dhu al-Qarnayn.

== See also ==
- Gates of Alexander
- History of Alexander
- Letters of Alexander the Great

== Sources ==
- Anderson, Andrew Runni (1932). Alexander's Gate, Gog and Magog: And the Inclosed Nations. Mediaeval Academy of America. ISBN 9780910956079.
- Armstrong, Edward C. (1937). The Medieval French Roman d'Alexandre. Vol. VI. Princeton University Press.
- Boyle, John Andrew (1979), "Alexander and the Mongols", The Journal of the Royal Asiatic Society of Great Britain and Ireland, 111 (2): 123–136, doi:10.1017/S0035869X00135555, JSTOR 25211053, S2CID 164166534
- Budge, Sir Ernest Alfred Wallis, ed. (1889). "A Christian Legend concerning Alexander". The History of Alexander the Great, Being the Syriac Version. Vol. II. Cambridge University Press. pp. 144–158.
- Debié, Muriel (2022). "Textual Exchanges in Late Antiquity: East and South of Byzantium Seen Through an Eastern Christian Lens". Proceedings of the 24th International Congress of Byzantine Studies Plenary Sessions. Vol. 1. Fondazione Università Ca’Foscari.
- Debié, Muriel (2024). Alexandre le Grand en syriaque. Les Belles Lettres.
- Gleede, Benjamin (2021). Antiochenische Kosmographie? Zur Begründung und Verbreitung nichtsphärischer Weltkonzeptionen in der antiken Christenheit. De Gruyter.
- Monferrer-Sala, Juan Pedro (2011). "Alexander The Great In The Syriac Literary Tradition". In Zuwiyya, David (ed.). A Companion to Alexander Literature in the Middle Ages. Brill. pp. 41–72. ISBN 978-90-04-21193-3.
- Meyer, Paul (1886). Alexandre le Grand dans la littérature française du moyen âge. F. Vieweg. p. 170.
- Shoemaker, Stephen (2018). The Apocalypse of Empire: Imperial Eschatology in Late Antiquity and Early Islam. University of Pennsylvania Press.
- Stoneman, Richard (tr.), ed. (1991). The Greek Alexander Romance. Penguin. ISBN 9780141907116.
- Tesei, Tommaso (2014). "The prophecy of Ḏū-l-Qarnayn (Q 18:83-102) and the Origins of the Qurʾānic Corpus". Miscellanea Arabica: 273–290.
- Tesei, Tommaso (2023). The Syriac Legend of Alexander's Gate. Oxford University Press.
- Van Bladel, Kevin (2008). "The Alexander Legend in the Qur'an 18:83-102". In Reynolds, Gabriel Said (ed.). The Qurʼān in Its Historical Context. Routledge.
- Van Donzel, Emeri J.; Schmidt, Andrea Barbara (2010). Gog and Magog in Early Eastern Christian and Islamic Sources: Sallam's Quest for Alexander's Wall. Brill. ISBN 978-9004174160.
- Westrem, Scott D. (1998). "Against Gog and Magog". In Tomasch, Sylvia; Sealy, Gilles (eds.). Text and Territory: Geographical Imagination in the European Middle Ages. University of Pennsylvania Press. ISBN 0812216350.
- Klar, Marianna (2020). "Qur'anic Exempla and Late Antique Narratives". The Oxford Handbook of Qur'anic Studies. Oxford University Press. p. 134,137. ISBN 9780199698646.
