= Children of Moses (disambiguation) =

Children of Moses were legendary descendants of Moses.

Children of Moses may also refer to:

- Actual children of Moses
- B'nai Moshe, a group of converts to Judaism in Peru
- B'nei Moshe, Zionist organization
- 2007 book by Turkish writer Ergün Poyraz
