= Borodulin =

Borodulin or Baradulin (Russian: Бородулин, Belarusian: Барадулин) is a Russian masculine surname, its feminine counterpart is Borodulina or Baradulina. It may refer to

- Artem Borodulin (born 1989), Russian figure skater
- Lazar Borodulin (1879–1947) Jewish-American Yiddish writers
- Lev Borodulin, Russian and Israeli photographer
- Mikhail Borodulin, Kazakhstani professional ice hockey player
- Ryhor Baradulin (1935–2014), Belarusian poet, essayist and translator
- Tatiana Borodulina (born 1984), Russian short-track speed skater
