= Gates of Alexander =

Mountain passes linked with Alexander the Great

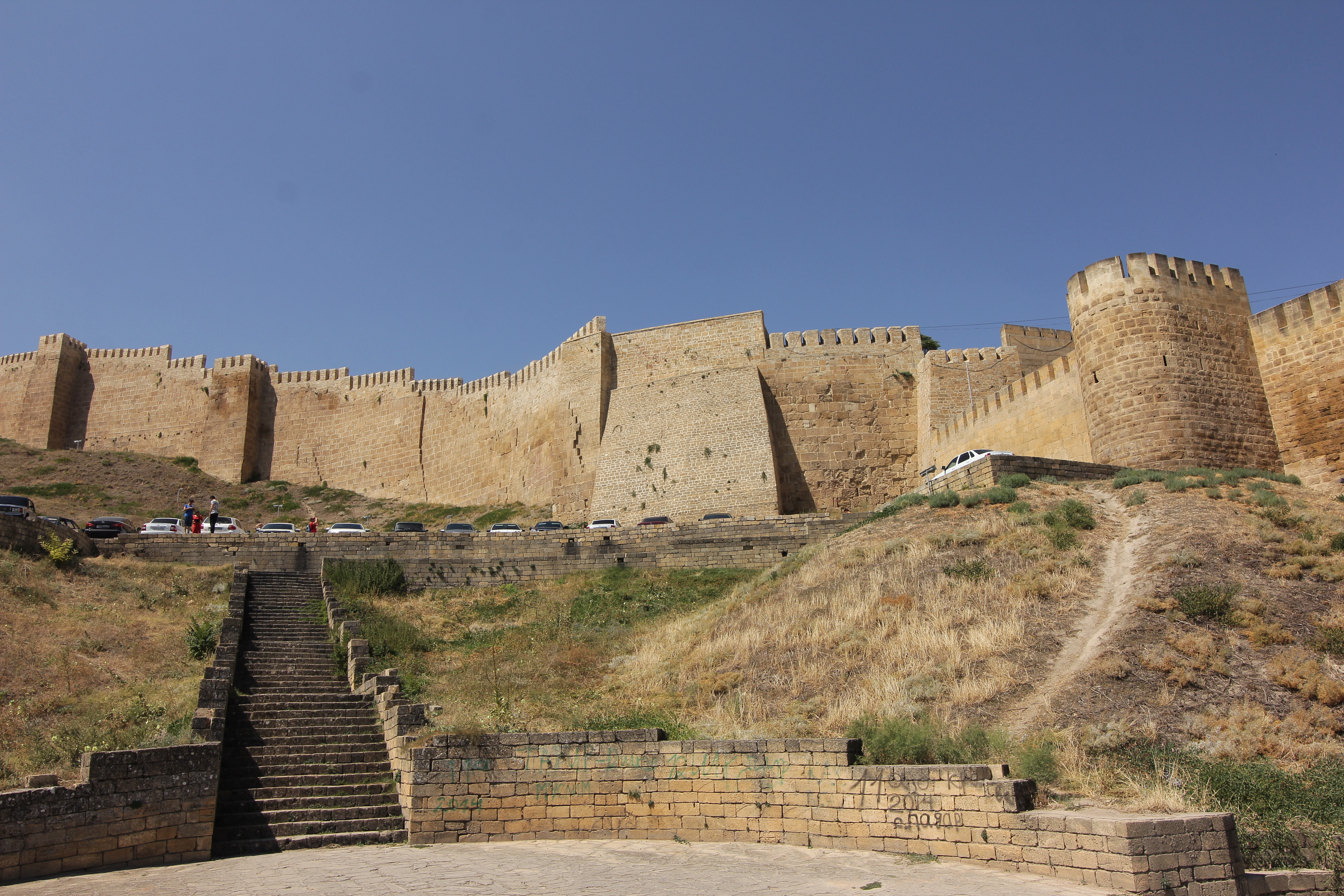
The Gates of Alexander are usually identified with the Fortifications of Derbent

The Gates of Alexander, also known as the Caspian Gates, are one of several mountain passes in eastern Anatolia, the Caucasus, and Persia, often imagined as an actual fortification, or as a symbolic boundary separating the civilized from the uncivilized world. The original Gates of Alexander were just south of the Caspian Sea, at Rhagae, where Alexander crossed while pursuing Darius III. The name was transferred to passes through the Caucasus, on the other side of the Caspian, by the more fanciful historians of Alexander.

Various other passes in the Caucasus and Anatolia have been called the Gates of Alexander since at least the 1st century AD. Later, the Caspian Gates were also identified with the Pass of Derbent (in modern Dagestan) on the Caspian; or with the Pass of Dariel, a gorge forming a pass between Georgia and North Ossetia–Alania. Tradition also connects it to the Great Wall of Gorgan (Red Snake) on its south-eastern shore. These fortifications were historically part of the defence lines built by the Sassanid Persians, while the Great Wall of Gorgan may have been built by the Parthians.

Alongside other motifs such as the Horns of Alexander, the Gates of Alexander became commonly associated with Alexander legends, as in the Alexander Romance, the Syriac Alexander Romance, and the Qissat Dhulqarnayn.

== Literary traditions ==
=== Pliny the Elder ===
Pliny the Elder (23 AD – 25 August 79 AD), in his Natural History, says that Alexander passed through the Caspian Gates, which he contrasts with the Gates of the Caucasus, a vast natural feature in a mountain chain rent asunder. Here, he says gates with iron covered beams have been placed above a horribly odorous river, along with a fortress to bar the passage of the innumerable tribes. These gates divide the world into two portions.

=== Josephus ===
Josephus, a Jewish historian in the 1st century, gives the first extant reference to gates constructed by Alexander, designed to be a barrier against the Scythians. According to this historian, the people whom the Greeks called Scythians were known (among the Jews) as Magogites, descendants of the group called Magog in the Hebrew Bible. Josephus makes these references in two of his works. The Jewish War states that the iron gates Alexander erected were controlled by the king of Hyrcania (on the south edge of the Caspian), and allowing passage of the gates to the Alans (whom Josephus considered a Scythic tribe) resulted in the sack of Media. Josephus's Antiquities of the Jews contains two relevant passages, one giving the ancestry of Scythians as descendants of Magog son of Japheth, and another that refers to the Caspian Gates being breached by Scythians allied to Tiberius during the Armenian War. (Note: Josephus, Antiquities of the Jews 1.123 and 18.97; The Jewish War 7.244-51)

=== Pseudo-Hegesippus (which is actually a misinterpretation of his name Iossippus - see https://www.newadvent.org/cathen/07195a.htm ===
In his description of the Alans, Pseudo-Hegesippus follows Josephus in mentioning the construction by Alexander of an iron gate to section off the barbarian group. In the first of two references to this gate, Ps. Hegesippus, places its location at the Taurus Mountains. This is mentioned in the context of a discussion on Alexander's founding of the Antioch of the Orontes, and therefore represents Alexander not only as a founder of civilization but also its protector. In the second reference, it is informed that Alexander had confined the Alans among other savage nations but that, either due to a bribe or political conflict, they were able to persuade the king of Hyrcania to let them burst out. Although not itself apocalyptic, the description of Ps. Hegesippus foreshadows the development of the apocalyptic narrative of Gog and Magog behind Alexander's wall, for it is first in his text that the notion is developed that the tribe behind the wall have actually been confined or imprisoned behind it.

=== Jerome ===
Jerome states in the late-fourth century in his seventy-seventh letter that "the gates of Alexander keep back the wild peoples behind the Caucasus". Like Ps. Hegesippus, and unlike the later traditions of the Syrian church, Jerome was concerned with the Greco-Roman discourses on civilization and barbarity as opposed to apocalypse.

=== Jordanes ===
Jordanes was a Byzantine author of the sixth century. In a detailed discussion on the Amazons in a Latin work of his named the Getica, he wrote that Alexander had built a set of gates and called them the Caspian Gates. These gates, he said, were guarded by the Laz people of Roman Georgia.

=== Procopius ===
The Gates are also mentioned in Procopius's History of the Wars: Book I. Here they are mentioned as the Caspian Gates and they are a source of diplomatic conflict between the Byzantines and the Sassanid Persians. When the current holder of the gates dies, he bequeaths it to Emperor Anastasius. Anastasius, unable and unwilling to finance a garrison for the gates, loses them in an assault by the Sassanid King Cabades (Kavadh I). After peace, Anastasius builds the city of Dara, which would be a focus point for war during the reign of Justinian and site of the Battle of Dara. In this war, the Persians once again bring up the gates during negotiations, mentioning that they block the pass to the Huns for the benefit of both Persians and Byzantines, and that the Persians deserve to be compensated for their service.

=== Rabbinic literature ===
The story of Alexander's construction of walls to seal away and confine Gog and Magog is absent from the rabbinic literature.

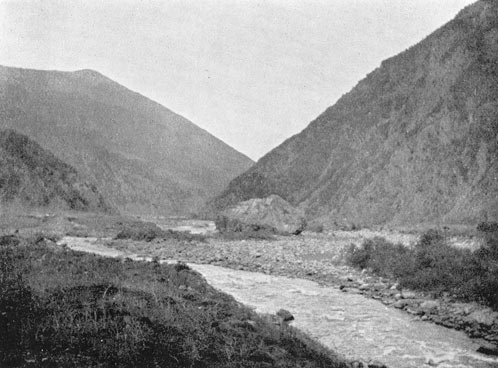
The Darial Gorge before 1906

=== Alexander Romance ===
The Gates occur in later versions of the Alexander Romance of Pseudo-Callisthenes. This version locates the gates between two mountains called the "Breasts of the North" (Greek: Μαζοὶ Βορρᾶ). The mountains are initially 18 feet apart and the pass is rather wide, but Alexander's prayers to God causes the mountains to draw nearer, thus narrowing the pass. There he builds the Caspian Gates out of bronze, coating them with fast-sticking oil. The gates enclosed twenty-two nations and their monarchs, including Gog and Magog (therein called "Goth and Magoth"). The geographic location of these mountains is rather vague, described as a 50-day march away northwards after Alexander put to flight his Belsyrian enemies (the Bebrykes, of Bithynia in modern-day North Turkey).

=== Syriac Alexander Legend ===
The late antique Christian Syriac Alexander Legend transformed the gates into an apocalyptic barrier built by Alexander in the Caucasus to keep out the nations of Gog and Magog. This development was inspired by some elements of the historical context of the time, including dread of the northern hordes, a variety of Persian fortifications meant to seal off the movement of steppe nomads, and eschatological thinking and attitudes of the time. At its outset, the Syriac Alexander Legend (otherwise known as the Neshana) records Alexander constructing a wall of iron to prevent an invasion of the Huns that would result in the plunder of peoples and countries. Alexander commanded that the gate should be constructed out of iron and bronze, for which he recruited three thousand blacksmiths to work the latter and three thousand other men for the former. However, it was believed that the barbarian tribes would break through during the apocalypse. The dimensions and features of the gate are described in detail, and Alexander was said to have placed an inscription on it which reads "The Huns will come forth and subdue the countries of the Romans and Persians; they will shoot arrows with armagest and will return and enter their country. Moreover, I wrote that (at) the end of eight hundred and twenty six years, the Huns would come forth by the narrow road..." (the inscription goes on for several more pages). This prophecy whereby the Huns break through the gates is linked to the invasion of the Sabir people in 515 AD as Syriac texts would use the Seleucid calendrical system which began in 1 October, 312 BCE; by subtracting 311 or 312, a date of 514/5 is arrived at, representing a vaticinium ex eventu. A second prophecy of an incursion appears for 940 SE, pinpointing to 628/9 AD and corresponds with the invasion of Armenia by the Turkic Khazars (not to be confused with a reference to the Turks which may not occur in this type of literature until the ninth century), although this may have been an interpolation that was made into the text during the reign of Heraclius to update the narrative for a contemporary political situation.

The description of the gates of Alexander in the Syriac Alexander Legend influenced most subsequent Syriac literature describing these events.

=== Tiburtine Sibyl ===
More indirect, the Tiburtine Sibyl records that Alexander "enclosed" the people of Gog and Magog to prevent their incursion from the north, coinciding with the statement that at some point in the future they will rise again and break through.

=== Quran ===
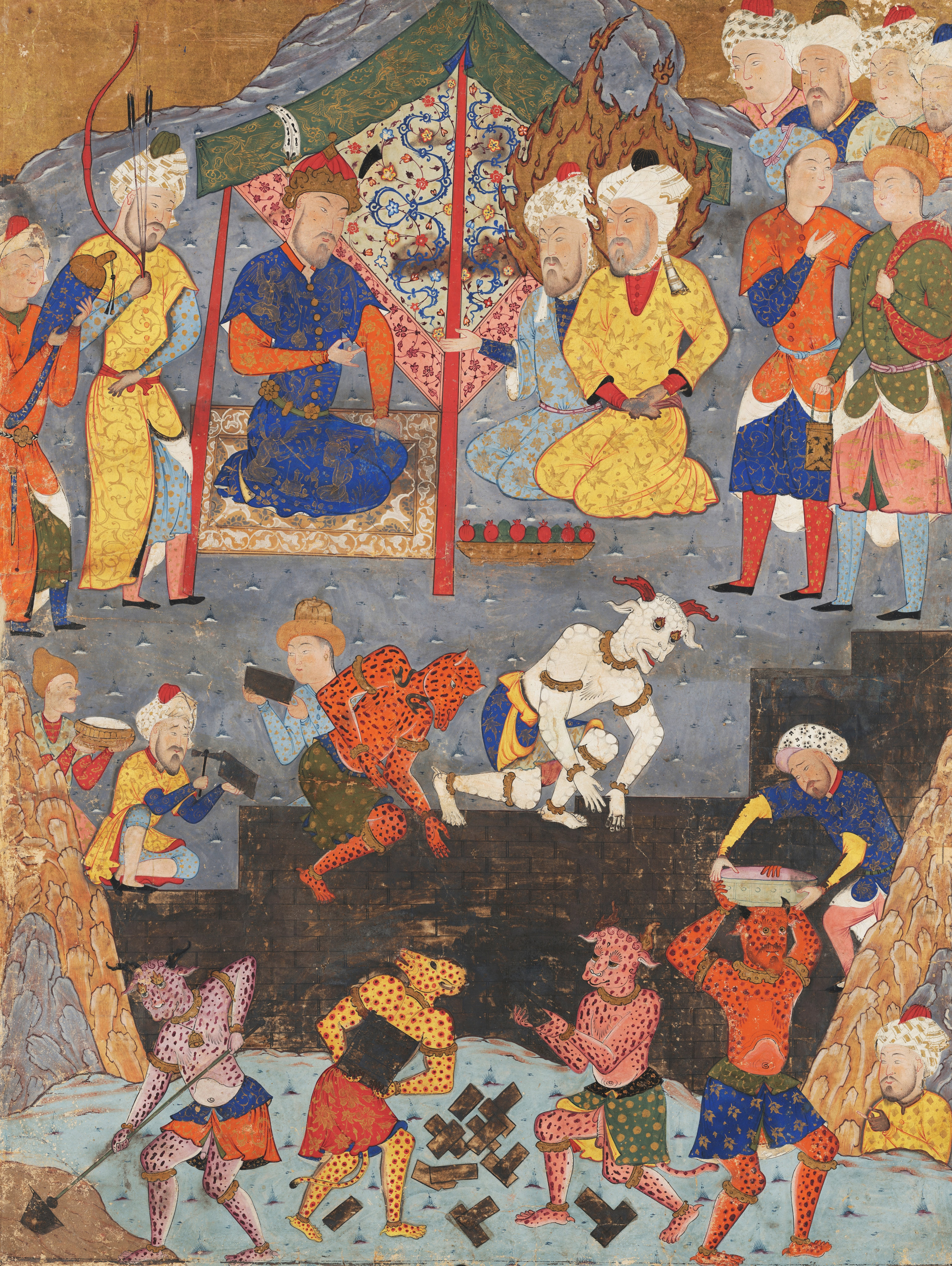
Dhu al-Qarnayn building a wall with the help of jinn to keep away Gog and Magog. Persian miniature from a book of Falnama copied for the Safavid Shah Tahmasp I (r. 1524–1576), currently preserved in the Chester Beatty Library, Dublin.

A similar narration is mentioned in al-Kahf ("The Cave"), the 18th chapter of the Quran. According to the Quranic narrative, Gog and Magog (Arabic: يأجوج ومأجوج Yaʾjūj wa-Maʾjūj) were walled off by Dhu al-Qarnayn ("possessor of the Two Horns"), a righteous ruler and conqueror who reached the west and the east. The barrier was constructed with melted iron sheets and covered with copper. There is debate regarding whether the Quran is referring to the Gates of Alexander, or to a different fortification.

=== Late Medieval literature ===
During the Middle Ages, the Gates of Alexander story was included in travel literature such as the Travels of Marco Polo and the Travels of Sir John Mandeville. The identities of the nations trapped behind the wall are not always consistent, however; Mandeville claims Gog and Magog are really the Ten Lost Tribes of Israel, who will emerge from their prison during the End Times and unite with their fellow Jews to attack the Christians. Polo speaks of Alexander's Iron Gates, but says the Comanians are the ones trapped behind it. He does mention Gog and Magog, however, locating them north of Cathay. Some scholars have taken this as an oblique and confused reference to the Great Wall of China, which he does not mention otherwise. The Gates of Alexander may represent an attempt by Westerners to explain stories from China of a great king building a great wall. Knowledge of Chinese innovations such as the compass and south-pointing chariot is known to have been diffused (and confused) across Eurasian trade routes.

Other medieval literature, such as the Latin Frankish Chronicle of Fredegar in the first half of the seventh century and the tenth-century Armenian History of Movsēs Dasxurancʿi connected Alexander's gates especially to events during the reign of Heraclius, the Byzantine emperor who defeated the Sasanian Empire in their great war of the first decades of the seventh century.

The medieval German legend of the Red Jews was partially based on stories of the Gates of Alexander. The legend disappeared before the 17th century.

== Geographical identifications ==
=== Medieval ===
In medieval world maps, the land of Gog and Magog is generally shown as a region in the far north, northeast, or east of Asia, enclosed by mountains or fortifications and often featuring a gate. It is depicted in this way on Arabian world maps starting from the 10th century, as also on the Tabula Rogeriana, an influential map drawn in 1154 by Muhammad al-Idrisi for Roger II of Sicily.

=== Modern ===
Caspian Gates: Darial Gorge, Derbent, Rhaegae, Wall of Gorgan. ( Iberia; Hyrcania)

It is not clear which precise location Josephus meant when he described the Caspian gates. It may have been the Gates of Derbent (lying due east, nearer to Persia), or it may have been the Darial Gorge, lying west, bordering Iberia, located between present-day Ingushetia and Georgia.

However, neither of these were within Hyrcania, but lay to the north and west of its boundaries. Another suggestion is some mountain pass in the Taurus-Zagros Mountains, somewhere near Rhaegae, Iran, in the heart of Hyrcania.

==== Derbent ====
The Gates of Alexander are most commonly identified with the Caspian Gates of Derbent, whose thirty north-looking towers used to stretch for forty kilometers between the Caspian Sea and the Caucasus Mountains, effectively blocking the passage across the Caucasus.

Derbent was built around a Sassanid Persian fortress, which served as a strategic location protecting the empire from attacks by the Gokturks. The historical Caspian Gates were not built until probably the reign of Khosrow I in the 6th century, about 850 years after Alexander's time, but they came to be credited to him in the passing centuries. The immense wall had a height of up to twenty meters and a thickness of about 10 feet (3 m) when it was in use.

==== Darial ====
The Pass of Dariel or Darial has also been known as the "Gates of Alexander" and is a strong candidate for the identity of the Caspian Gates.

==== Wall of Gorgan ====
An alternative theory links the Caspian Gates to the so-called "Alexander's Wall" (the Great Wall of Gorgan) on the south-eastern shore of the Caspian Sea, 180 km of which is still preserved today, albeit in a very poor state of repair.

The Great Wall of Gorgan was built during the Parthian dynasty simultaneously with the construction of the Great Wall of China and it was restored and improved during the Sassanid era (3rd–7th centuries). During this later era, the wall was developed into a fluid and advanced system of defense that allowed Sassanian Persia to defeat the Hephthalite invasions of the 6–7th centuries AD.

== See also ==
- Cilician Gates
- Dzungarian Gate
- Iron Gate (Central Asia)
