= Apocalypse of Pseudo-Ephraem =

Apocalypse of Pseudo-Ephraem is a title given to two different pseudo-epigraphical texts attributed to the church father Ephrem the Syrian. One is extant in Syriac, and the other, based on a lost Syriac original, in Latin. These are respectively known as the Syriac Apocalypse of pseudo-Ephraim, and the Latin Apocalypse of pseudo-Ephraim. The Latin text has the reference number CPL 1144. It is one of the Syriac apocalyptic texts.

== The Syriac Apocalypse/metrical homily of pseudo-Ephraim ==
The Syriac Apocalypse is a poem of 560 lines on apocalyptic themes. It is written through the lens of Middle Eastern events which took place at the time it was written, which seems to have been in the late seventh century. G. Reinink notes that this text does not show any direct link with the Latin sermon.

The text also relies on the Syriac Alexander Legend for its Gog and Magog motif, and so must post-date this text. Both Caspari, the editor of the Latin edition of the text, and Paul Alexander date it between the late 6th and early 7th centuries, but no later than ~630 AD, as the text frequently discusses wars between the Byzantines and Persians and so cannot post-date the final victory over the Sasanian Empire by Heraclius in 628. More recently, Reinink has contended for a date between 640 and 680, with the later date primarily being on the basis of its familiarity with the Arab invasions.

== The Latin Apocalypse of pseudo-Ephraim / pseudo-Ephrem, Sermo De Fine Mundi ==
This text exists in four manuscripts and has the title "De fine mundi et consumatione saeculi et conturbatione gentium" or simply "de fine mundi". It was first published by Caspari in 1890.

The date of the text is uncertain. It was initially dated to 373 AD by Bossuet,, but McGinn suggests between 565 and 628.G. Reinink does not commit to a date, although hinting at the 7th century, but suggests that the Latin text was translated from Greek, itself influenced by a Syriac source, and probably.

Caspari noted in that the text in some places shows a very close relation with the Apocalypse of Pseudo-Methodius.

A study has been made of the biblical quotations in the text.

== Other Ephrem texts ==
There are other texts under the name of Ephrem in many different languages, including Greek - the majority -, Coptic, Armenian and Latin. Few have anything to do with the original Ephrem the Syrian. Many of the texts in Latin and Armenian derive from the Greek texts. The Greek texts are known collectively as Ephraem Graecus. All of these are different from the Apocalypse of pseudo-Ephraim..

== Pre-Tribulationism ==
The Latin Apocalypse has attracted popular interest because a passage within it has been used to argue that a pretribulational rapture view existed in the early church. This passage from the Latin version says:

"All the saints and elect of God are gathered together before the tribulation, which is to come, and are taken to the Lord, in order that they may not see."

The unrelated Syriac Apocalypse text implies that it is death that will cause some to avoid the tribulation:

"Pronouncing the good fortune of the deceased Who had avoided the calamity: 'Blessed are you for you were borne away (to the grave) And hence you escaped from the afflictions!"

Additionally, there are several passages even in the Latin version that imply Christians will not escape the tribulation. For example:

"In those days [during the tribulation] people shall not be buried, neither Christian, nor heretic, neither Jew, nor pagan, because of fear and dread there is not one who buries them; because all people, while they are fleeing, ignore them."

"Then, when this inevitability has overwhelmed all people, just and unjust, the just, so that they may be found good by their Lord; and indeed the unjust, so that they may be damned forever with their author the Devil."
