= Borgia map =

World map made in the early 15th century

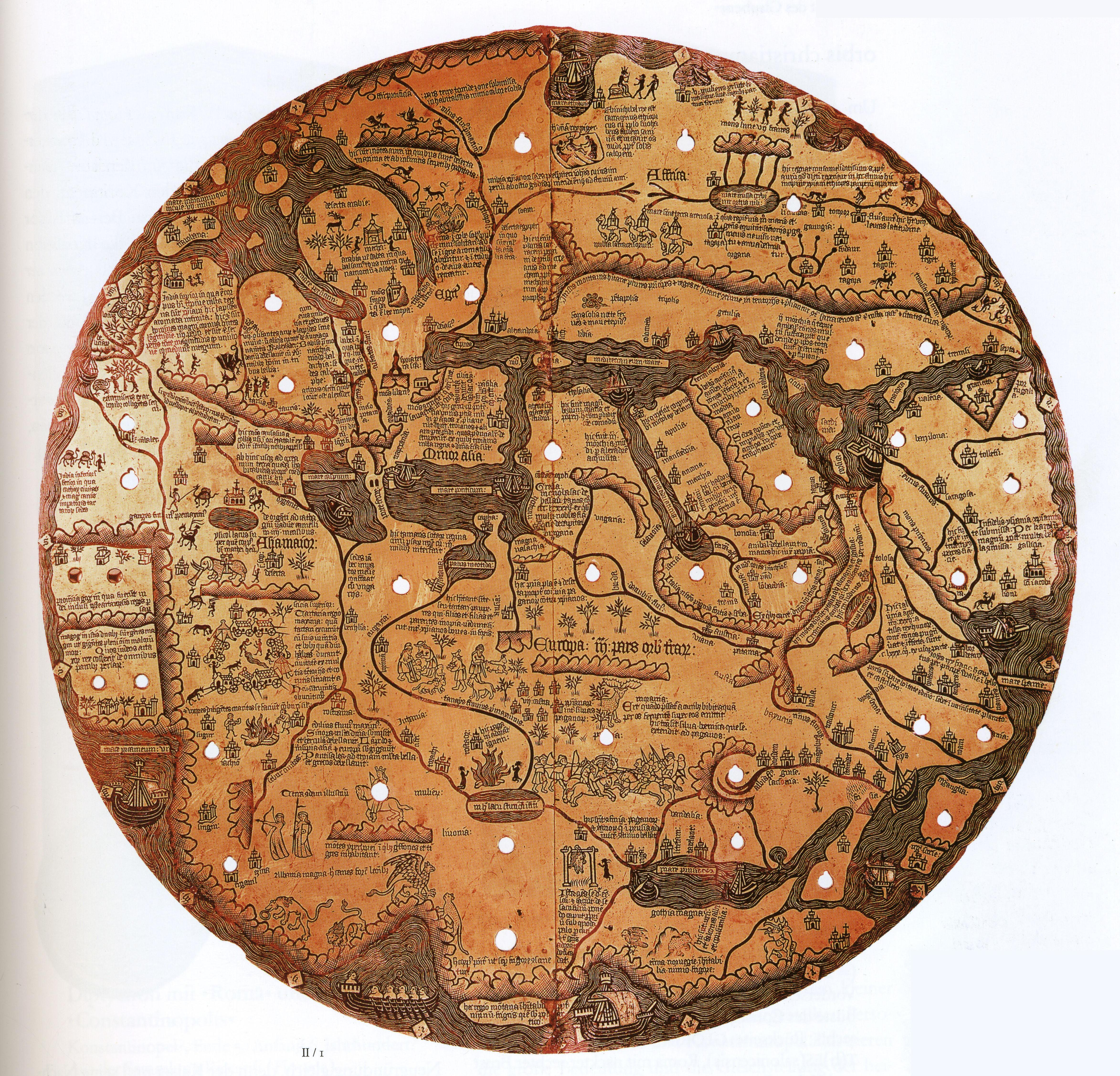
The Borgia world map. Africa is at the top of the map, with Europe at the bottom right. Vatican Library, Rome.

Mainly a decoration piece, the Borgia map is a world map made sometime in the early 15th century, and engraved on a metal plate. Its "workmanship and written explanations make it one of the most precious pieces of the history of cartography".

== History ==
The exact year when the Borgia map was created is unknown. One source argues that the map must date from sometime before 1453. Another source suggests the map was made c.1450.

In the late 18th century the artifact found its way into an antique shop, from where it became part of the collection of Cardinal Stefano Borgia. The script appearing on the map identifies it as being south German. However, nothing about the authorship of the Borgia map is known. The emphasis on history, and the traditional nomenclature (names/terms/principles) suggests that it was originally designed as a historical map, for use in a library or a school.

== Details ==
On the Borgia map, the Garden of Eden is positioned near India superior - the mouth of the Ganges, and is portrayed as a land of marvels and precious stones. It is also quite close to China, a country which is represented by tiny figures collecting silk from the trees.

The Babylonian, Alexandrian, Carthaginian and Roman Empires are emphasized on the map in an orderly sequence. Of the chaotic Italian state at the time, the mapmaker comments that "Italy, beautiful, fertile, strong and proud, from lack of a single lord, has no justice". Special mentions are made of various Crusades including: Charlemagne's campaign in the Iberian Peninsula, crusading in northeastern Europe, Africa, and Nicopolis, and the "future" threat of the Gog and Magog, who are described specifically as "Jews". The map has a well crafted design, and was made to last a long time.

The Borgia map includes a legend referring to Ebinichibel, who is described as "the Saracen Ethiopian king with his dog-headed people".

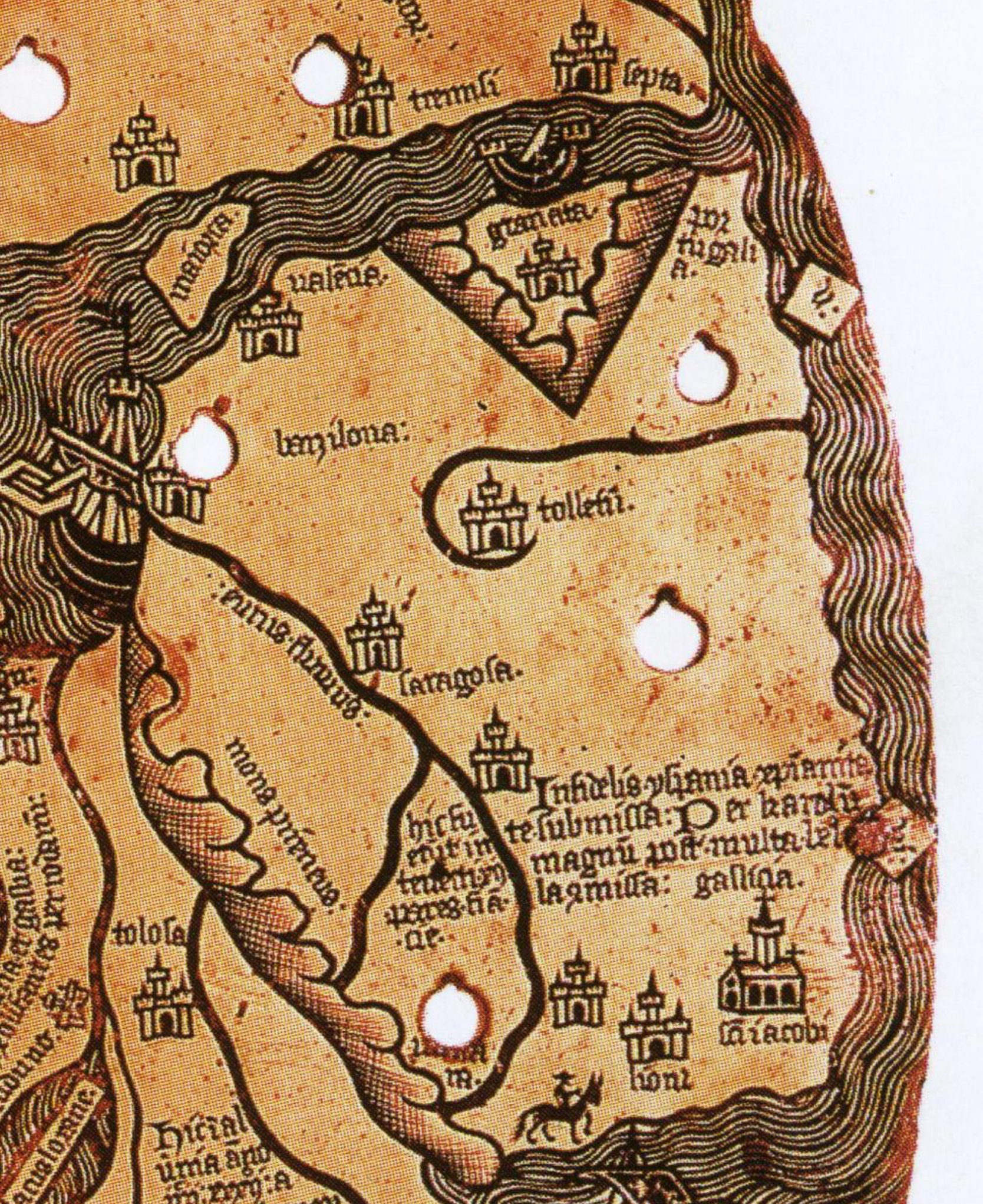
Fragment of the Borgia Map showing the Iberian Peninsula, with mention of Barcelona (Barzilona) and València, among other cities.
