= Syriac apocalyptic literature =

Christian texts prophesizing the end of the world

Syriac apocalyptic literature are Christian texts in the apocalyptic genre of Syriac literature concerned with prophesying the end of the world. They were written in the Syriac language, primarily during the 600s and 700s CE, a period when Christians felt they were facing an existential threat due to the rise of Islam and the fall of the Persian empire.

By far the most famous of these works is the Apocalypse of Pseudo-Methodius. Written in the 600s, it spread widely, becoming "one of the medieval world's most popular and widely translated texts."

The other Syriac apocalyptic works are the Apocalypse of John the Little (written in the 700s); the Apocalypse of Pseudo-Ezra (700s-1100s); the Syriac Apocalypse of Daniel (600s); and the Syriac Apocalypse of Pseudo-Ephraem (600s). Some scholars include the Bahira Legend, a work by a Christian monk in the 1100s or later, and the Poem on Alexander the Great, also called the Alexander Romance.

The Apocalypse of Pseudo-Ephraem refers to two pseudo-epigraphical texts, one in Syriac, the other in Latin, attributed to the church father Ephrem the Syrian.

Not all texts called Syriac Apocalypses fall into this category. For instance, 2 Baruch, also known as the Apocalypse of Baruch, is sometimes called the Syriac Apocalypse of Baruch (to distinguish it from 3 Baruch, the Greek Apocalypse of Baruch), but it is a Jewish apocryphal text written before 200 CE, after the destruction of the Temple in 70 CE.

== See also ==
- Apocalyptic literature
- Christian eschatology
