= Gog and Magog =

Pair of individuals, peoples, or lands in the Bible and the Quran

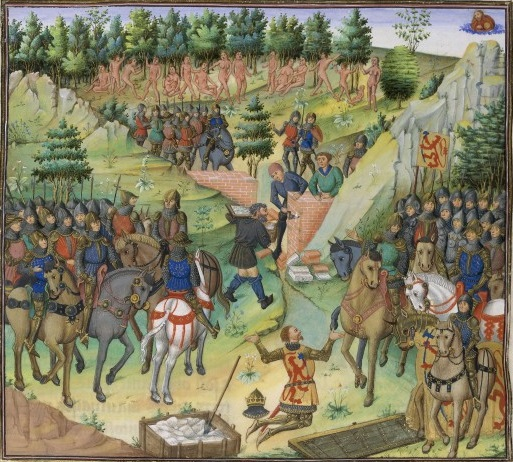
The Gog and Magog people being walled off by Alexander's forces. –Jean Wauquelin's Book of Alexander. Bruges, Belgium, 15th century

Gog and Magog (/ˈɡɒɡ ... ˈmeɪɡɒɡ/; Hebrew: גּוֹג וּמָגוֹג, romanized: Gōg ū-Māgōg), or Ya'juj and Ma'juj (Arabic: يَأْجُوجُ وَمَأْجُوجُ, romanized: Yaʾjūj^{u} wa-Maʾjūj^{u}), are a pair of names that appear in the Hebrew Bible, the New Testament of the Christian Bible, and the Quran, variously ascribed to individuals, tribes, or lands. In Ezekiel 38, Gog is an individual and Magog is his land. By the time of the New Testament's Revelation 20, Abrahamic tradition had come to view Ezekiel's "Gog from Magog" as "Gog and Magog".

The Gog prophecy is meant to be fulfilled at the approach of what is called the "end of days", but not necessarily the end of the world. Jewish eschatology views Gog and Magog as enemies to be defeated by the Messiah, which would usher in the Messianic Age. One view within Christianity is more starkly apocalyptic, making Gog and Magog allies of Satan against God at the end of the millennium, as described in the Book of Revelation.

A legend was attached to Gog and Magog by the time of the Roman period that the Gates of Alexander were erected by Alexander the Great to repel the tribe. Romanised Jewish historian Josephus knew them as the nation descended from Magog the Japhetite named in the Book of Genesis, hypothesizing them to be the Scythians. In the hands of Early Christian writers, they became apocalyptic hordes. Throughout the Middle Ages, they were variously identified as the Vikings, Huns, Khazars, Mongols or other nomads, or even the Ten Lost Tribes of Israel.

The legends of Gog and Magog and the gates were also interpolated into the Alexander Romances. According to one interpretation, "Goth and Magothy" are the kings of the Unclean Nations whom Alexander drove through a mountain pass and prevented from crossing his new wall. Gog and Magog are said to engage in human cannibalism in the romances and derived literature. They have also been depicted on medieval cosmological maps, or mappae mundi, sometimes alongside Alexander's wall.

The conflation of Gog and Magog with the legend of Alexander and the Iron Gates was disseminated throughout the Near East in the early centuries of the Christian and Islamic eras. They appear in the Quran in chapter al-Kahf as Yajuj and Majuj, primitive and immoral tribes that were separated and barriered off by Dhu'l-Qarnayn ("He of the Two Horns"), who is mentioned in the Quran as a great, righteous ruler and conqueror. Some Muslim historians and geographers contemporaneous with the Vikings regarded them as the emergence of Gog and Magog.

== Names ==
The names are mentioned together in Ezekiel 38:2, with Gog being an individual and Magog as his land. The meaning of the name Gog remains uncertain, and in any case, the author of the Ezekiel prophecy seems to attach no particular importance to it. Efforts have been made to identify him with various individuals, notably Gyges, a king of Lydia in the early 7th century BC, but many scholars do not believe he is related to any historical individual.

In Genesis 10, Magog is described as a son of Japheth, and a grandson of Noah, although there is no mention there of a person named Gog. The name Magog itself is of obscure origin. It is often associated with Assyrian mat-Gugu ('Land of Gyges'; i.e., Lydia). Alternatively, Gog may be derived from Magog rather than the other way around, and "Magog" may be code for "Babylon". (Note: The encryption technique is called atbash. BBL ("Babylon") when read backwards and displaced by one letter becomes MGG (Magog).)

The form "Gog and Magog" may have emerged as shorthand for "Gog and/of the land of Magog", based on their usage in the Septuagint, the Greek translation of the Hebrew Bible. An example of this combined form in Hebrew (Gog u-Magog) has been found, but its context is unclear, being preserved only in a fragment of the Dead Sea Scrolls. (Note: 4Q523 scroll) In the book of Revelation, Gog and Magog together are the hostile nations of the world. Gog the Reubenite occurs in 1 Chronicles 5:4, but he has no connection with the Gog of Ezekiel or Magog of Genesis.

The biblical "Gog and Magog" may have given rise to the name Gogmagog, a legendary British giant. (Note: The giant mentioned by Geoffrey of Monmouth in Historia Regum Britanniae (1136 AD).) A later corrupted folk rendition in print altered the tradition around Gogmagog and Corineus with two giants Gog and Magog, with whom the Guildhall statues came to be identified.

== Jewish texts ==
=== Ezekiel ===
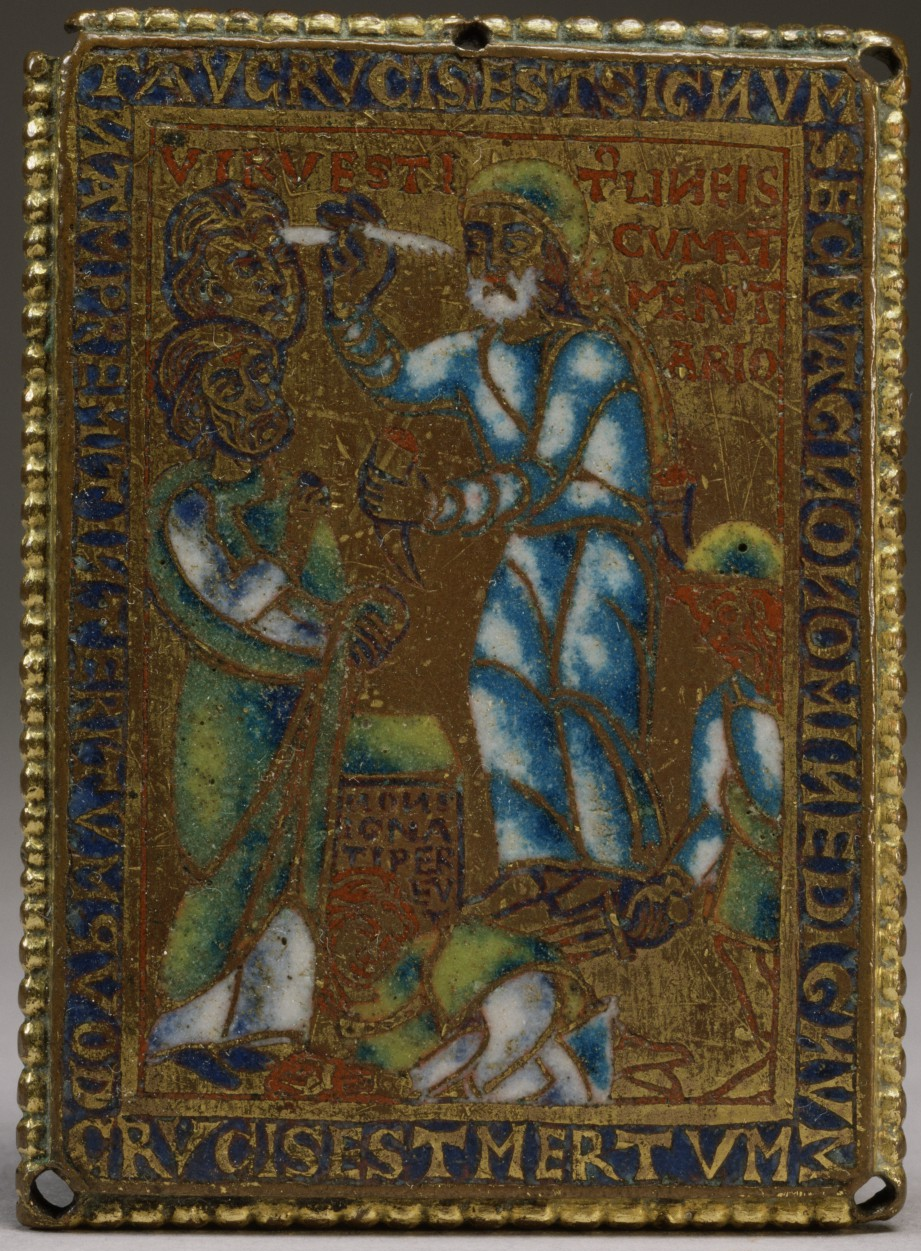
Ezekiel's Vision of the Sign "Tau" from Ezekiel IX:2–7. —Mosan champlevé panel, mid-12th century

The Book of Ezekiel records a series of visions received by the prophet Ezekiel, a priest of Solomon's Temple, who was among the captives during the Babylonian exile. The exile, he tells his fellow captives, is God's punishment on Israel for turning away, but God will restore his people to Jerusalem when they return to him. After this message of reassurance, chapters 38–39, the Gog oracle, tell how Gog of Magog and his hordes will threaten the restored Israel but will be destroyed, after which God will establish a new Temple and dwell with his people for a period of lasting peace (chapters 40–48).

"Son of man, direct your face against Gog, of the land of Magog, the prince, leader of Meshech and Tubal, and prophesy concerning him. Say: Thus said the Lord: Behold, I am against you, Gog, the prince, leader of Meshech and Tubal ... Persia, Cush and Put will be with you ... also Gomer with all its troops, and Beth Togarmah from the far north with all its troops—the many nations with you."

Internal evidence indicates that the Gog oracle was composed substantially later than the chapters around it. (Note: Composed between the 4th and 2nd centuries BC.) Of Gog's allies, Meshech and Tubal were 7th-century BC kingdoms in central Anatolia north of Israel, Persia towards the east, Cush (Ethiopia) and Put (Libya) to the south; Gomer is the Cimmerians, a nomadic people north of the Black Sea, and Beth Togarmah was on the border of Tubal. The confederation thus represents a multinational alliance surrounding Israel. "Why the prophet's gaze should have focused on these particular nations is unclear", comments Biblical scholar Daniel I. Block, but their remoteness and reputation for violence and mystery possibly "made Gog and his confederates perfect symbols of the archetypal enemy, rising against God and his people." One explanation is that the Gog alliance, a blend of the "Table of Nations" in Genesis 10 and Tyre's trading partners in Ezekiel 27, with Persia added, was cast in the role of end-time enemies of Israel by means of Isaiah 66:19, which is another text of eschatological foretelling.

Although the prophecy refers to Gog as an enemy in some future, it is not clear if the confrontation is meant to occur in a final "end of days" since the Hebrew term aḥarit ha-yamim (Hebrew: אחרית הימים) may merely mean "latter days", and is open to interpretation. Twentieth-century scholars have used the term to denote the eschaton in a malleable sense, not necessarily meaning final days, or tied to the Apocalypse. (Note: Tooman's view is that the "latter days" means "the end of history-as-we-know-it and the initiation of a new historical age".) Still, the Utopia of chapters 40–48 can be spoken of in the parlance of true eschatological character, given that it is a product of "cosmic conflict" described in the immediately preceding Gog chapters.

The Septuagint reads "Gog" instead of "Agag" in Numbers 24:7.

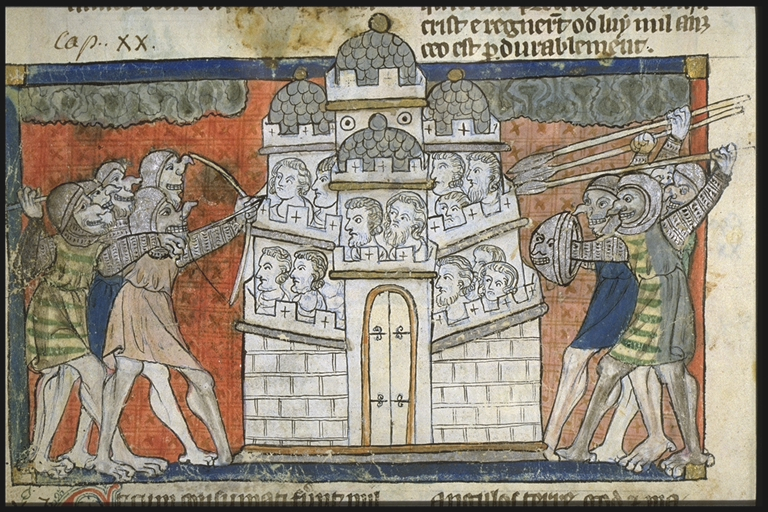
Gog and Magog besiege the City of Saints. Their depiction with the hooked noses noted by Paul Meyer. —Old French Apocalypse in verse, Toulouse MS. 815, fol. 49v

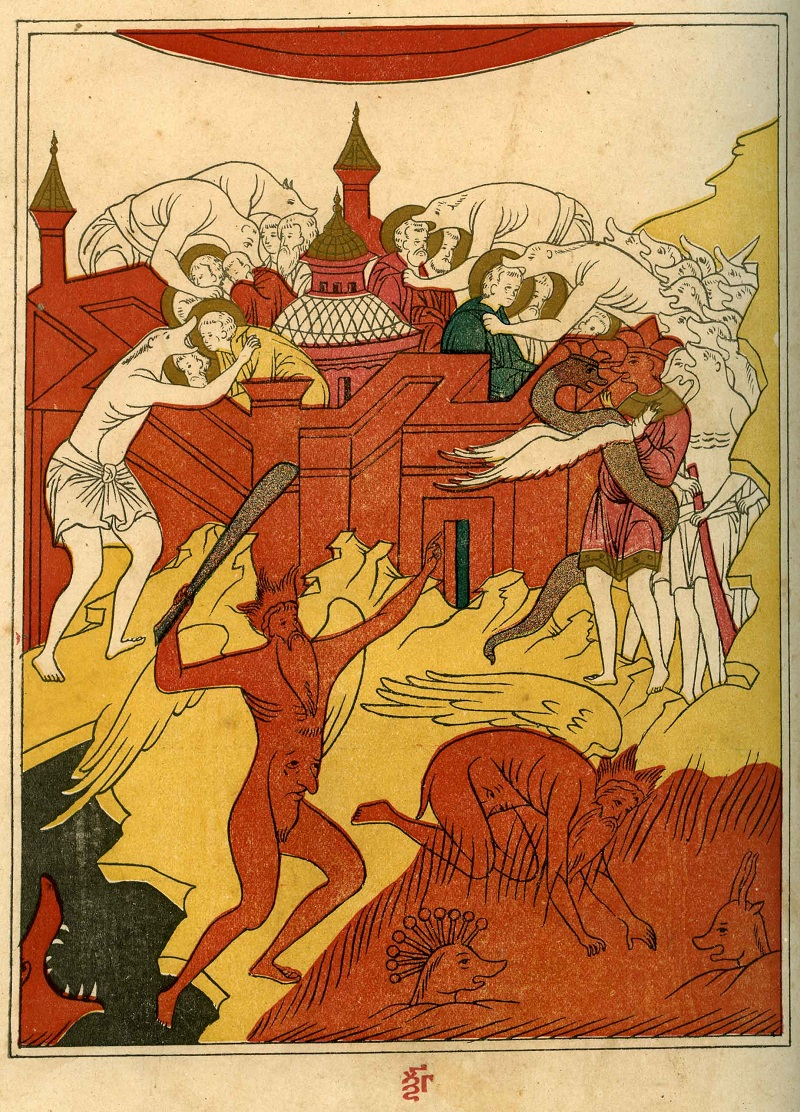
Devil, Gog and Magog attack the Holy City (from a 17th-century Russian manuscript).

Over the next few centuries Jewish tradition changed Ezekiel's Gog from Magog into Gog and Magog. The process, and the shifting geography of Gog and Magog, can be traced through the literature of the period. The 3rd book of the Sibylline Oracles, for example, which originated in Egyptian Judaism in the middle of the 2nd century BC, changes Ezekiel's "Gog from Magog" to "Gog and Magog", links their fate with up to eleven other nations, and places them "in the midst of Aethiopian rivers"; this seems a strange location, but ancient geography did sometimes place Ethiopia next to Persia or even India. The passage has a highly uncertain text, with manuscripts varying in their groupings of the letters of the Greek text into words, leading to different readings; one group of manuscripts ("group Y") links them with the "Marsians and Dacians", in eastern Europe, amongst others.

The Book of Jubilees, from about the same time, makes three references to either Gog or Magog: in the first, Magog is a descendant of Noah, as in Genesis 10; in the second, Gog is a region next to Japheth's borders; and in the third, a portion of Japheth's land is assigned to Magog. The 1st-century Liber Antiquitatum Biblicarum, which retells Biblical history from Adam to Saul, is notable for listing and naming seven of Magog's sons, and mentions his "thousands" of descendants. The Samaritan Torah and the Septuagint (a Greek translation of the Hebrew Bible made during the last few centuries of the pre-Christian era) occasionally introduce the name of Gog where the Hebrew original has something else, or use Magog where the Hebrew has Gog, indicating that the names were interchangeable.

=== Midrashic writings ===
The anti-Roman Bar Kokhba revolt in the 2nd century AD looked to a human leader as the promised messiah, but after its failure Jews began to conceive of the messianic age in supernatural terms: first would come a forerunner, the Messiah ben Joseph, who would defeat Israel's enemies, identified as Gog and Magog, to prepare the way for the Messiah ben David; (Note: The coming of the Messiah ben David "is contemporary with or just after that of Messiah ben Joseph." (van der Woude (1974), p. 527.).) then the dead would rise, divine judgement would be handed out, and the righteous would be rewarded.

The aggadah, homiletic and non-legalistic exegetical texts in the classical rabbinic literature of Judaism, treat Gog and Magog as two names for the same nation who will come against Israel in the final war. The rabbis associated no specific nation or territory with them beyond a location to the north of Israel, but the great Jewish scholar Rashi identified the Christians as their allies and said God would thwart their plan to kill all Israel.

=== Commentary on Torah portion "Nasso" ===
The "Fruit of the Righteous" or "Pri Tzaddik" on the weekly portion Nasso, connects Gog u-Magog with Amalek. In this work from Rabbi Zadok HaKohen of Lublin it can be read in chapter 15:2:

And after all of this, there still will be war of Gog u-Magog upon the Messiah son of Yoseph, for Gog u-Magog is the seed of Amalek, and Amalek corresponds always to the opposite of the sanctity of Israel, deeply...

Similarly, in the Tanakh, book of Judges 5:14 (JPS 1985) it can be read:

From Ephraim came they whose roots are in Amalek.

== Christian texts ==
=== Revelation ===
Chapters 19:11–21:8 of the Book of Revelation, dating from the end of the 1st century AD, tell how Satan is to be imprisoned for a thousand years, and how, on his release, he will rally "the nations in the four corners of the Earth, Gog and Magog", to a final battle with Christ and his saints:

When the thousand years are over, Satan will be released from his prison and will go out to deceive the nations in the four corners of the Earth—Gog and Magog—and to gather them for battle. In number they are like the sand on the seashore.

=== Alexander Romance ===
The Alexander Romance of Pseudo-Callisthenes describes gates constructed by Alexander the Great between two mountains called the "Breasts of the North" (Greek: Μαζοί Βορρά). The mountains are initially 18 feet apart and the pass is rather wide, but Alexander's prayers to God causes the mountains to draw nearer, thus narrowing the pass. There he builds the Caspian Gates out of bronze, coating them with fast-sticking oil. The gates enclosed twenty-two nations and their monarchs, including Gog and Magog (therein called "Goth and Magoth"). The geographic location of these mountains is rather vague, described as a 50-day march away northwards after Alexander put to flight his Belsyrian enemies (the Bebrykes, of Bithynia in modern-day North Turkey).

Christian texts following in the tradition of the Alexander Romance, such as the Syriac Alexander Legend (late 7th century) and the Apocalypse of Pseudo-Methodius (7th century) would continue to identify Gog and Magog as among those barbarian groups encapsulated behind Alexander's walls, but they would also combine this with the apocalyptic motif of Revelation and assert that the end of the world would also involve the barbarian groups penetrating through the wall and bringing about the apocalypse.

== Islamic texts ==
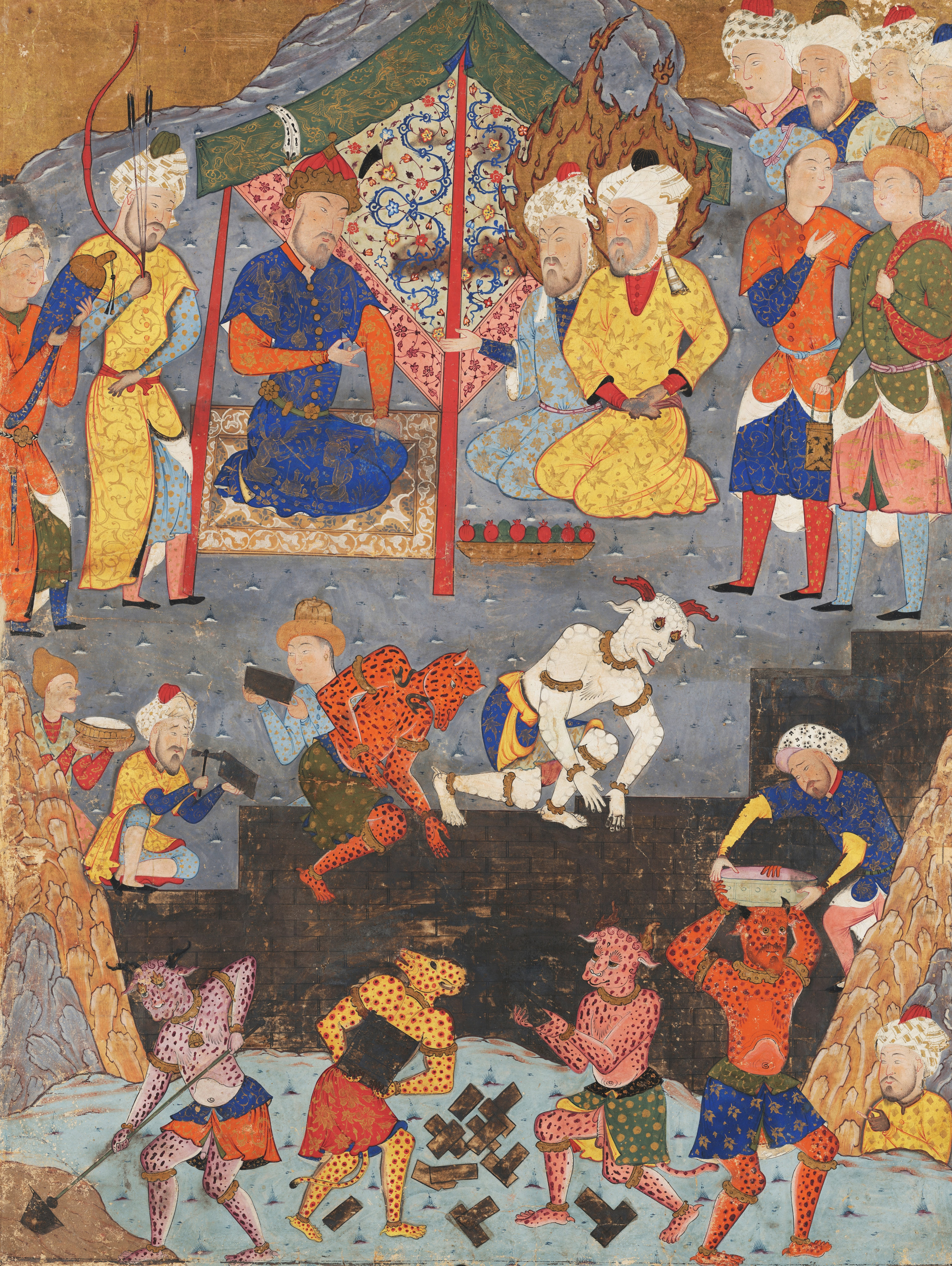
Iskandar (Alexander) builds a wall to seal Yajuj and Majuj; here aided by dīvs (demons). Persian miniature from a Falnama, 16th century

Two chapters of the Qur'an, al-Kahf (Chapter 18) and al-Anbiya (Chapter 21), discuss Gog and Magog. In the Qur'an, Ya'juj and Ma'juj (Gog and Magog) are suppressed by Dhu'l-Qarnayn (Arabic: ذو القرنين, lit. 'the two-horned one'). Dhu'l-Qarnayn, having journeyed to the ends of the world, meets "a people who scarcely understood a word" who seek his help in building a barrier that will separate them from the people of Ya'juj and Ma'juj who "do great mischief on earth." He agrees to build it for them, but warns that when the time comes (Last Age), God will remove the barrier.

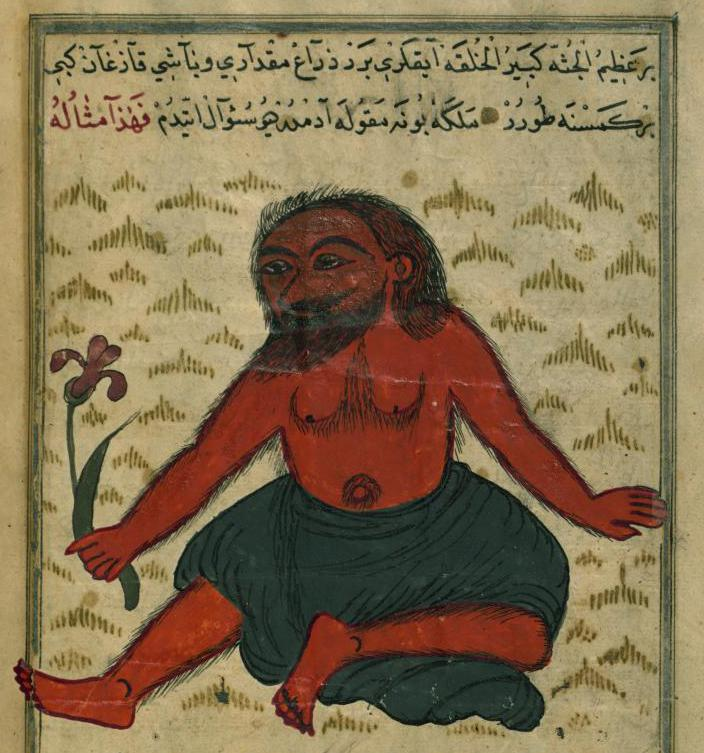
The Monster of Gog and Magog, by al-Qazwini (1203–1283)

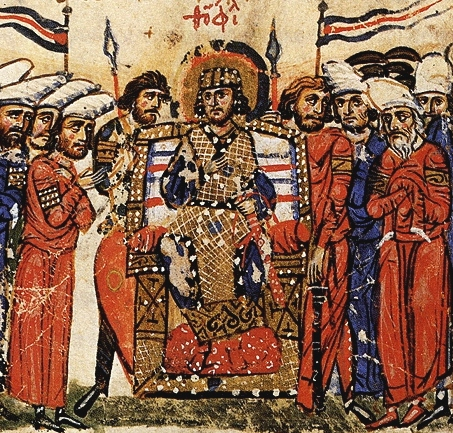
A Byzantine ruler protected by two Vikings, often compared with Gog and Magog.

The early Muslim traditions were summarised by Zakariya al-Qazwini (d. 1283) in two popular works called the Cosmography and the Geography. Gog and Magog, he says, live near to the sea and can be counted only by God; this sea is claimed to be the Caspian Sea, Black Sea or the Sea of Azov. They are human, but only half the height of a normal man, with claws instead of nails, and a hairy tail and huge hairy ears which they use as mattress and cover for sleeping. They dig into their wall each day until they almost break through. They break for the night saying, "Tomorrow we will finish", but each night God restores it. Then one day, as they stop digging for the night, one will say, "Tomorrow we will finish, God Willing", and in the morning, it is not restored as with every night. When they do break through, they will be so numerous that, "Their vanguard is in Syria and their rear in Khorasan."

=== Location of the wall ===
The wall dividing them from civilised peoples was normally placed towards today's Armenia and Azerbaijan, but in the year 842 the Caliph al-Wathiq had a dream in which he saw that it had been breached, and sent an official named Sallam to investigate. Sallam returned a little over two years later and reported that he had seen the wall and also the tower where Dhu'l-Qarnayn had left his building equipment, and all was still intact. It is not entirely clear what Sallam saw, but he may have reached Derbent in the Caucasus or the Jade Gate and the westernmost customs point on the border of China. Somewhat later the 14th-century traveller Ibn Battuta reported that the wall was sixty days' travel from the city of Zeitun, which is on the coast of China; the translator notes that Ibn Battuta has confused the Great Wall of China with that built by Dhu'l-Qarnayn.

The Fortifications of Derbent and the Great Wall of Gorgan are associated with the Wall of Dhu'l-Qarnayn, fortifying the Gates of Alexander in the Caucasus and Iron Gate (Central Asia) in Central Asia. They were built by various Iranian empires; by the Sasanian era, these and other walls were part of the Sasanian defense lines, though construction on the Great Wall of Gorgan may have begun during the Parthian Empire.

=== Identifications ===
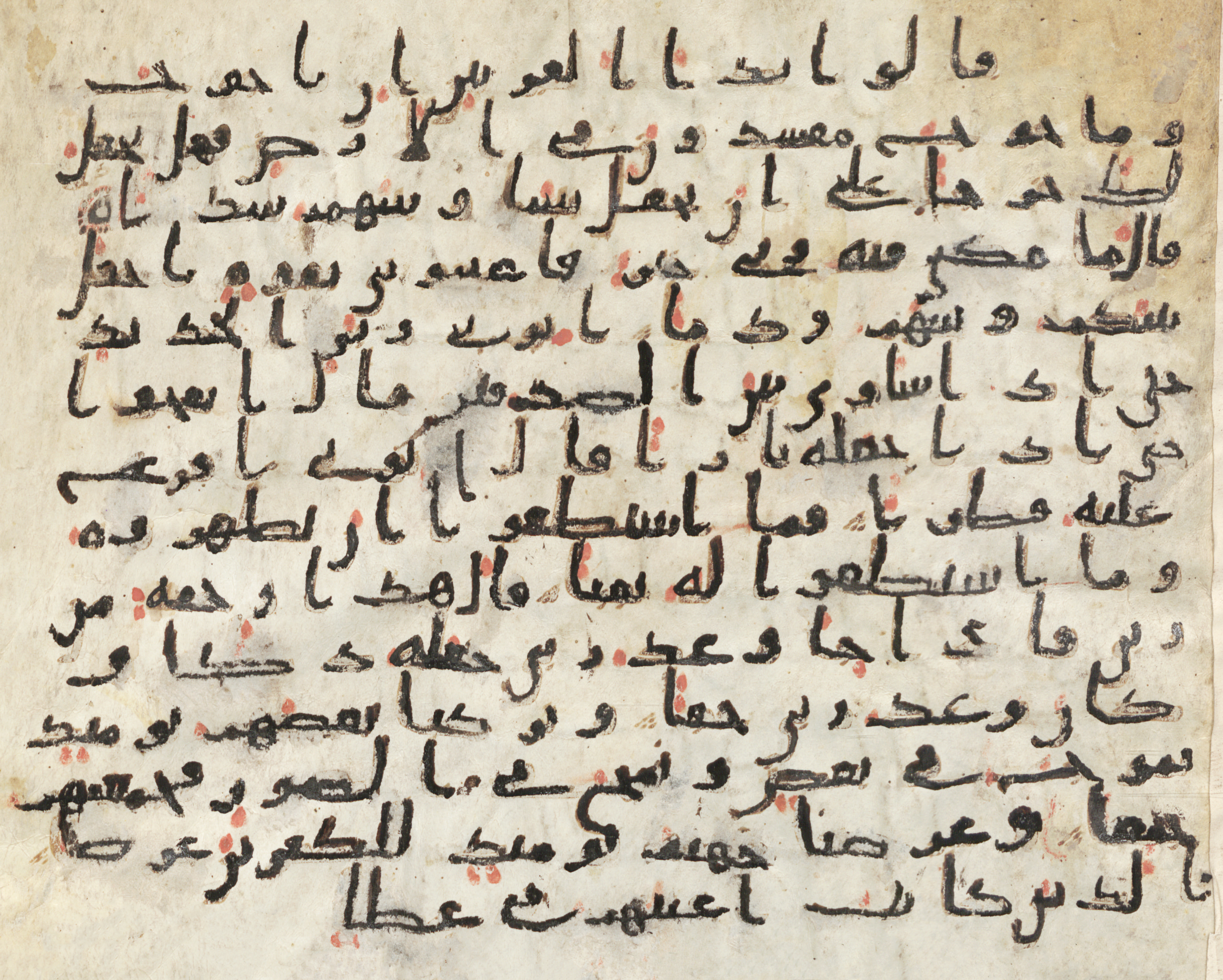
660-710 CE Quran manuscript telling of Dhu'l-Qarnayn banishing Gog and Magog. (Sura al-Kahf, Ayat 94-100).

Various nations and peoples in history were identified as Ya'juj and Ma'juj. At one point, it was the Turks, who threatened Baghdad and northern Iran; later, when the Mongols destroyed Baghdad in 1258, it was they who were Gog and Magog. Others regarded the Vikings and their descendants as Gog and Magog, since the unknown group from Scandinavia had made their sudden and considerable entry into the history of Europe. Viking travelers and colonists were seen at many points in history as violent raiders. Many historical documents suggest that their conquests of other territories was retaliation in response to the encroachment upon tribal lands by Christian missionaries, and perhaps by the Saxon Wars prosecuted by Charlemagne and his kin to the south. Researches of professors and philosophers such as Allama Muhammad Iqbal, Syed Abul Ala Mawdudi, who played important roles in British and South Asian politics, and American academic Abu Ammaar Yasir Qadhi and Caribbean eschatologist Imran N. Hosein, compare the languages, behaviors and sexual activities of the tribes of Gog and Magog with those of Vikings.

Some scholars further attempt to relate Yajuj and Majuj to the Lake of Tiberias, currently known as the Sea of Galilee, the Earth's lowest freshwater lake, and the Dead Sea. Historian and exegete Ibn Kathir mentioned similar theories in his book al-Bidaya wa'l-Nihaya and mentions "Gog and Magog are two groups of Turks, descended from Yafith (Japheth), the father of the Turks, one of the sons of Noah."

=== In Indomalayan tradition ===
In Malay-Indonesian tradition, stories about Gog and Magog were introduced by way of translation from Abbasid-era Arabic texts by religious authorities. They increasingly became prominent during the 16th century, a period of heightened political rivalry and conflict. For example, a text known as the Hikayat Ya’juj wa-Ma’juj was read by some Malay warriors fighting against the Portuguese. Similarly, a poem originating in early 19th century Surakarta, a city located on the Indonesian island of Java, goes as far as to subvert Quranic teaching in order to use the story of Gog and Magog to vilify colonists from the Dutch colonial empire. Another text was the Hikayat Raja Iskandar ("Story of King Alexander"). This version argued, contrary to other traditions where both Gog and Magog variously descend from Adam, Noah, or Jesus, that Gog descended from the semen Adam produced while he dreamt of intercourse with Eve, and that Magog descended from the menstrual blood of Eve. Alexander ("Iskandar") is taught this story by the prophet Khidr. Nūr ad-Dīn ar-Ranīrī (d. 1658), a Gujariti scholar, depicted Gog and Magog as infidel tribes that eat dogs, descendants of Noah, and originally from Turkey.

=== In Sunni and Shia sources ===
According to a tradition in Shia sources, Yajooj and Majooj are not from the Children of Adam (the human race). Al-Kafi, one of their primary collections of ahadith although by a non-Shia chain, states that it has been narrated from Ibn Abbas that when he asked Ali about the "creatures", he responded by saying God has created "1,200 species on the land, 1,200 species in the sea, 70 species from the Children of Adam and the people are the Children of Adam except for the Yajooj and Majooj". Al-Majlisi, an influential Shia scholar, quotes another tradition linking them to Chinese, Slavs, and Turkic people, and saying they are from the children of Adam, then saying that it is stronger than the former tradition and takes priority.

Sunni sources, including those in Sahih al-Bukhari and Sahih Muslim, indicate that they are from the Children of Adam, and this is the belief of the overwhelming majority of Islamic scholars. The "Abbasid orthodoxy" believed the Ilkhanate Mongol invaders who laid siege to and then sacked Baghdad, were Gog and Magog. According to Sahih Muslim, prophet Muhammad said:

Then a people whom God had protected from him (dajjal) would come to Isa, son of Maryam, and he would wipe their faces and would inform them of their ranks in Paradise and it would be under such conditions that God would reveal to Isa (alaihis salam) these words: I have brought forth from amongst My servants such people against whom none would be able to fight; you take these people safely to the Mountain, and then God would send Gog and Magog and they would swarm down from every slope. The first of them would pass the lake of Tiberias and drink out of it. And when the last of them would pass, he would say: There was once water there.

== Alexander the Great ==
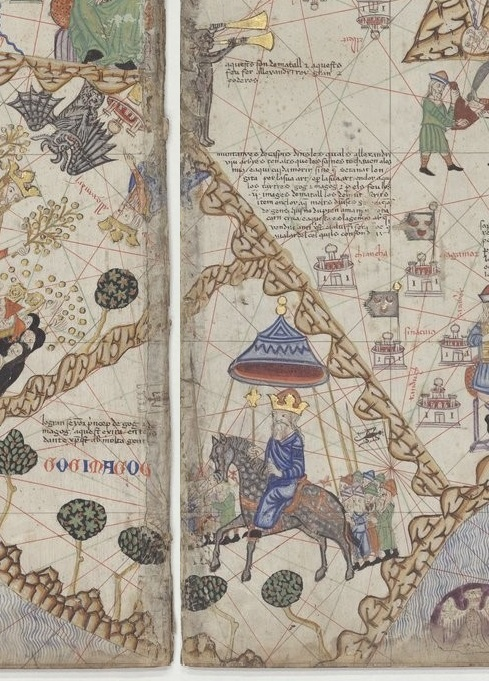
Land of "Gog i Magog", its king mounted on a horse, followed by a procession (lower half); Alexander's Gate, showing Alexander, Antichrist, and mechanical trumpeters (upper left). —Catalan Atlas (1375), Paris, Bibliothèque Nationale.

The 1st-century Jewish historian Josephus equated Magog with the Scythians in Antiquities of the Jews, but he never mentioned Gog. In another work, Josephus recounts that the Alans (whom he calls a Scythian tribe) were given passage by the Hyrcanian king, a warder of an iron gate built by Alexander. (Note: Josephus, Antiquities of the Jews 1.123 and 18.97; The Jewish War 7.244–51) By the time of Josephus, Alexander was already a Jewish folk hero. However, the earliest fusion of Alexander's gate and the apocalyptic nations of Gog and Magog is a product of late antiquity, in what is known as the Syriac Legend of Alexander.

=== Precursor texts in Syriac ===
In the Syriac Alexander Legend dating to 629–630, Gog (Syriac: ܓܘܓ, gwg) and Magog (Syriac: ܡܓܘܓܵ, mgwg) appear as kings of Hunnish nations. (Note: Also called Christian Legend concerning Alexander, ed. tr. by E. A. Wallis Budge. It has a long full-title, which in shorthand reads "An exploit of Alexander.. how.. he made a gate of iron, and shut it [against] the Huns.") Written by a Christian based in Mesopotamia, the Legend is considered the first work to connect the Gates with the idea that Gog and Magog are destined to play a role in the apocalypse. The legend claims that Alexander carved prophecies on the face of the Gate, marking a date for when these Huns, consisting of 24 nations, will breach the Gate and subjugate the greater part of the world. (Note: The first invasion, prophesied to occur 826 years after Alexander predicted, has been worked out to fall on 1 October 514; the second invasion on 629. (Boyle 1979, p. 124).)

The Pseudo-Methodius, written originally in Syriac, is considered the source of the Gog and Magog tale incorporated into Western versions of the Alexander Romance. The earlier-dated Syriac Alexander Legend contains a somewhat different treatment of the Gog and Magog material, which passed into the lost Arabic version, or the Ethiopic and later Oriental versions of the Alexander romance. (Note: The Ethiopic version derives from the lost Arabic version. (Boyle 1979, p. 133).)

The Pseudo-Methodius (7th century) is the first source in the Christian tradition for a new element: two mountains moving together to narrow the corridor, which was then sealed with a gate against Gog and Magog. This idea is also in the Quran (609–632 CE), and found its way in the Western Alexander Romance.

=== Alexander Romances ===
This Gog and Magog legend is not found in earlier versions of the Alexander Romance of Pseudo-Callisthenes, whose oldest manuscript dates to the 3rd century, (Note: The oldest manuscript is recension α. The material is not found in the oldest Greek, Latin, Armenian, and Syriac versions.) but an interpolation into recensions around the 8th century. (Note: Recension ε) In the latest and longest Greek version (Note: Recension γ) are described the Unclean Nations, which include the Goth and Magoth as their kings, and whose people engage in the habit of eating worms, dogs, human cadavers and fetuses. They were allied to Belsyrians (Bebrykes, of Bithynia in modern-day North Turkey), and sealed beyond the "Breasts of the North", a pair of mountains fifty days' march away towards the north. (Note: Alexander's prayer caused the mountains to move nearer, making the pass narrower, facilitating his building his gate. This is the aforementioned element first seen in pseudo-Methodius.)

Gog and Magog appear in somewhat later Old French versions of the romance. (Note: Gog and Magog being absent in the Alexandreis (1080) of Walter of Châtillon.) In the verse Roman d'Alexandre, Branch III, of Lambert le Tort (c. 1170), Gog and Magog ("Gos et Margos", "Got et Margot") were vassals to Porus, king of India, providing an auxiliary force of 400,000 men. (Note: Note the change in loyalties. According to the Greek version, Gog and Magog served the Belsyrians, whom Alexander fought them after completing his campaign against Porus.) Routed by Alexander, they escaped through a defile in the mountains of Tus (or Turs), (Note: "Tus" in Iran, near the Caspian south shore, known as Susia to the Greeks, is a city in the itinerary of the historical Alexander. Meyer does not make this identification, and suspects a corruption of mons Caspius etc.) and were sealed by the wall erected there, to last until the advent of the Antichrist. (Note: Branch III, laisses 124–128.) Branch IV of the poetic cycle tells that the task of guarding Gog and Magog, as well as the rule of Syria and Persia was assigned to Antigonus, one of Alexander's successors.

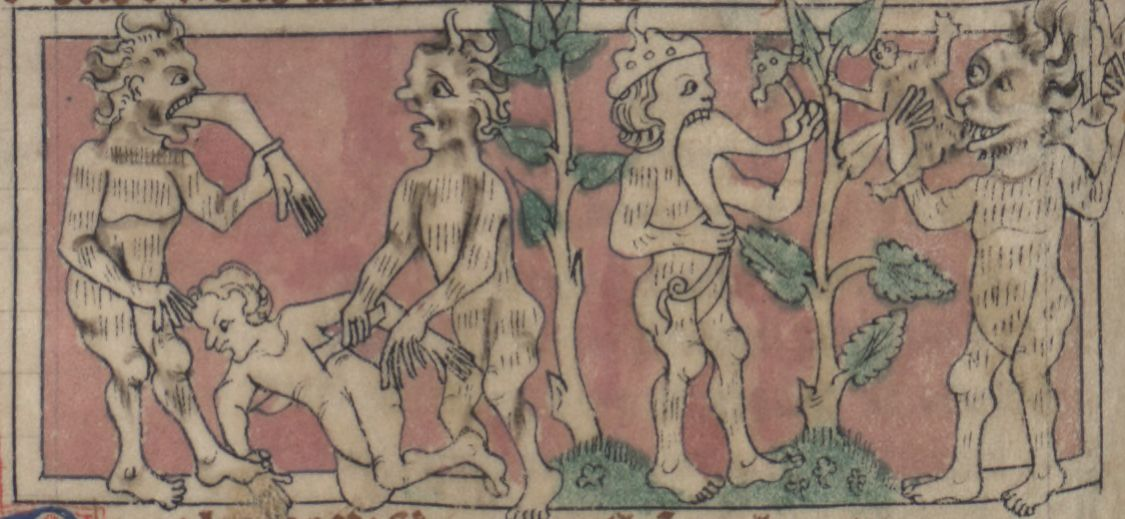
Gog and Magog consuming humans. —Thomas de Kent's Roman de toute chevalerie, Paris manuscript, 14th century

Gog and Magog also appear in Thomas de Kent's Roman de toute chevalerie (c. 1180), where they are portrayed as cave-dwellers who consume human flesh. A condensed account occurs in a derivative work, the Middle English King Alisaunder (vv. 5938–6287). In the 13th-century French Roman d'Alexandre en prose, Alexander has an encounter with cannibals who have taken over the role of Gog and Magog. This is a case of imperfect transmission, since the prose Alexander's source, the Latin work by Archpriest Leo of Naples known as Historia de Preliis, does mention "Gogh et Macgogh", at least in some manuscripts.

The Gog and Magog are not only human flesh-eaters, but illustrated as men "a notably beaked nose" in examples such as the "Sawley map", an important example of mappa mundi. Gog and Magog caricaturised as figures with hooked noses on a miniature depicting their attack of the Holy City, found in a manuscript of the Apocalypse in Anglo-Norman. (Note: Toulouse manuscript 815, folio 49v.)

== Identifications ==
=== Barbarian and nomadic identifications ===
Throughout classical and late antiquity, Christian and Jewish writers identified Gog and Magog with a wide diversity of groups:

- Romans. This identification was made by Eusebius.
- Goths. Gog and Magog were connected to the Goths by Ambrose (d. 397) and Jordanes (d. 555). The latter believed that the Goths, Scythians, and Amazons were all the same. (Note: The idea that Gog and Magog were connected with the Goths was longstanding; in the mid-16th century, Archbishop of Uppsala Johannes Magnus traced the royal family of Sweden back to Magog son of Japheth, via Suenno, progenitor of the Swedes, and Gog, ancestor of the Goths).) The Goths also represent Gog and Magog in the ε and γ recensions of the Alexander Romance, where the term "Gog and Magog" forms a portmanteau with "Goth" to form "Goth and Magoth".
- Scythians. The Scythian identification was made by Josephus, Jerome (d. 420), Jordanes, Theodore of Mopsuestia, Theodoret of Cyrrhus, Isidore of Seville, John Zonaras, and Otto of Freising.
- Sarmatians and Alans. This identification was made in Josephus (for whom the Scythians were a subgroup of the Alans), Pseudo-Hegesippus, and the Chronicon Paschale.
- Huns. The Byzantine writer Procopius said it was the Huns Alexander had locked out, and in the Syriac Alexander Legend the kingdom of the Huns is also used to represent Gog and Magog. This identification can also be found in Andreas of Caesarea, as well as multiple Syriac and Greek texts which followed the identification found in the Syriac Alexander Legend over the course of the seventh century and beyond: the Apocalypse of Pseudo-Ephraem, the Apocalypse of Pseudo-Methodius, the Vita Alexandri, and Michael the Syrian.
- Haphthalites. This identification was made by Movses Kaghankatvatsi.
- Avars and Magyars. This identification was made by Isidore of Seville, Theodore Synkellos, the Anonymi Bele regis notarii Gesta Hungarorum, and the Chronicon Pictum.
- Turks. In Islamic tradition, the following authors identified Gog and Magog as the Turks: Abu Hurayra, al-Dahhak ibn Muzahim, al-Baydawi, al-Qazwini, and al-Majlisi.
- Khazars. This identification was made by Aethicus Ister, Iovane Sabanisje, Christian of Stavelot, Ahmad ibn Fadlan, and the Hadith Dhi'l-Qarnayn.
- Mongols and Tartars. This identification was made by the Historia de Preliis, Richer of Senones, Matthew Paris, Marco Polo, Hayton of Corycus, Riccoldo da Monte di Croce, and the Continuation of Barhebraeus.
- Other. A Western monk named Fredegar seems to have Gog and Magog in mind in his description of savage hordes from beyond Alexander's gates who had assisted the Byzantine emperor Heraclius (610–641) against the Muslim Saracens.

=== Eurasian steppes ===
As one nomadic people followed another on the Eurasian steppes, so the identification of Gog and Magog shifted. In the 9th and 10th centuries these kingdoms were identified by some with the lands of the Khazars, a Turkic people whose leaders had converted to Judaism and whose empire dominated Central Asia–the 9th-century monk Christian of Stavelot referred to Gazari, said of the Khazars that they were "living in the lands of Gog and Magog" and noted that they were "circumcised and observing all [the laws of] Judaism". Arab traveler ibn Fadlan also reported of this belief, writing around 921 he recorded that "Khazars are part of the Gog and Magog".

After the Khazars came the Mongols, seen as a mysterious and invincible horde from the east who destroyed Muslim empires and kingdoms in the early 13th century; kings and popes took them for the legendary Prester John, marching to save Christians from the Muslim Saracens, but when they entered Poland and Hungary and annihilated Christian armies a terrified Europe concluded that they were "Magogoli", the offspring of Gog and Magog, released from the prison Alexander had constructed for them and heralding Armageddon.

Europeans in Medieval China reported findings from their travels to the Mongol Empire. Some accounts and maps began to place the "Caspian Mountains", and Gog and Magog, just outside the Great Wall of China. The Tartar Relation, an obscure account of Friar Carpini's 1240s journey to Mongolia, is unique in alleging that these Caspian Mountains in Mongolia, "where the Jews called Gog and Magog by their fellow countrymen are said to have been shut in by Alexander", were moreover purported by the Tartars to be magnetic, causing all iron equipment and weapons to fly off toward the mountains on approach. In 1251, the French friar André de Longjumeau informed his king that the Mongols originated from a desert further east, and an apocalyptic Gog and Magog ("Got and Margoth") people dwelled further beyond, confined by the mountains. In the map of Sharif Idrisi, the land of Gog and Magog is drawn in the northeast corner (beyond Northeast Asia) and enclosed. Some medieval European world maps also show the location of the lands of Gog and Magog in the far northeast of Asia (and the northeast corner of the world).

In fact, Gog and Magog were held by the Mongol to be their ancestors, at least by some segment of the population. As traveler and Friar Riccoldo da Monte di Croce put it in c. 1291, "They say themselves that they are descended from Gog and Magog: and on this account they are called Mogoli, as if from a corruption of Magogoli". Marco Polo, traveling when the initial terror had subsided, places Gog and Magog among the Tartars in Tenduc, but then claims that the names Gog and Magog are translations of the place-names Ung and Mungul, inhabited by the Ung and Mongols respectively.

An explanation offered by Orientalist Henry Yule was that Marco Polo was only referring to the "Rampart of Gog and Magog", a name for the Great Wall of China. Friar André's placement of Gog and Magog far east of Mongolia has been similarly explained.

=== The confined Jews ===
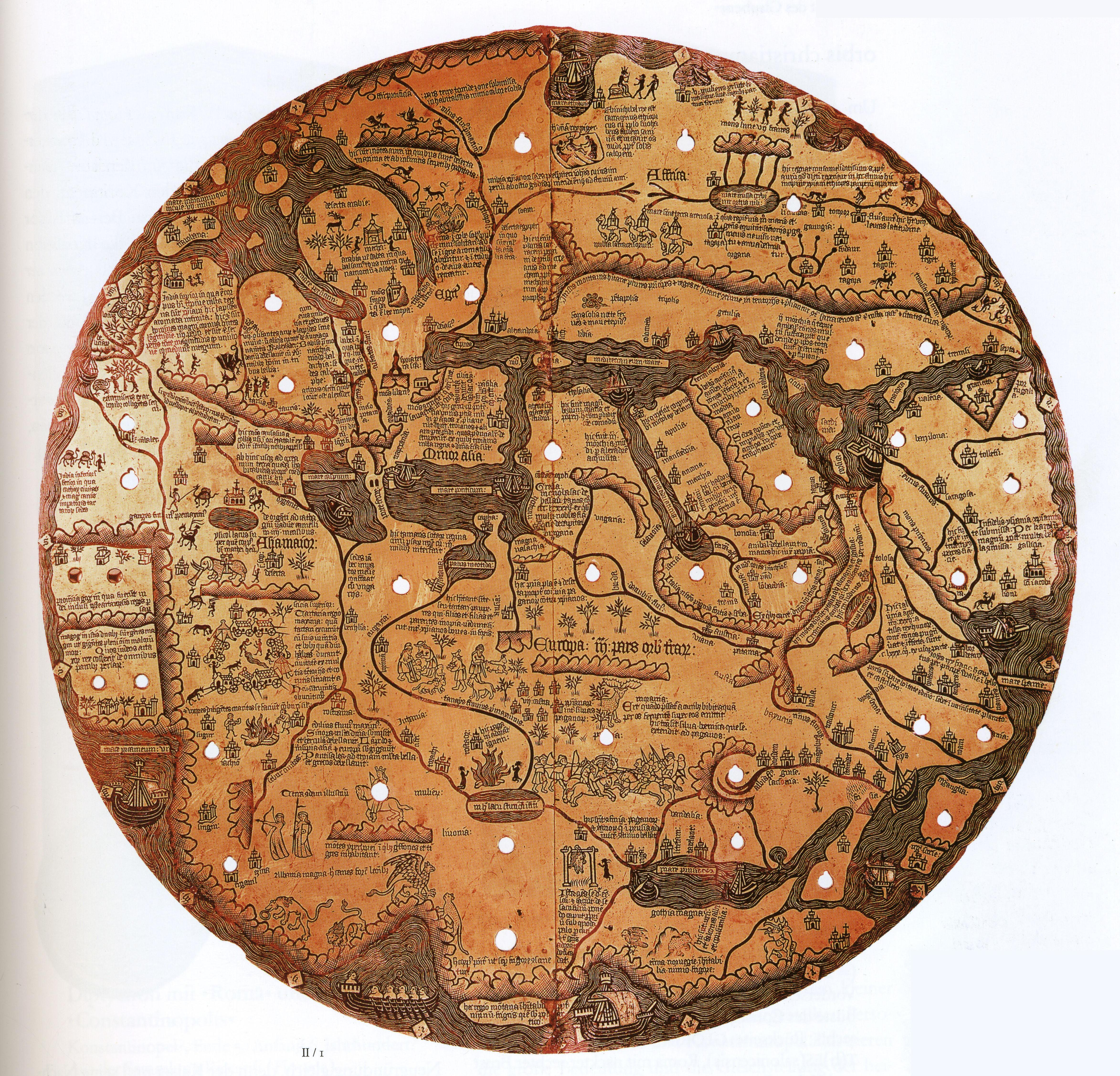
The Borgia map, copper-engraved world map (c. 1430). Gog and Magog (identified as confined Jews) are shown on the left, representing the far east.

Some time around the 12th century, the Ten Lost Tribes of Israel came to be identified with Gog and Magog; possibly the first to do so was Petrus Comestor in Historica Scholastica (c. 1169–1173), and he was indeed a far greater influence than others before him, although the idea had been anticipated by the aforementioned Christian of Stavelot, who noted that the Khazhars, to be identified with Gog and Magog, was one of seven tribes of the Hungarians and had converted to Judaism.

While the confounding Gog and Magog as confined Jews was becoming commonplace, some, like Riccoldo or Vincent de Beauvais remained skeptics, and distinguished the Lost Tribes from Gog and Magog. As noted, Riccoldo had reported a Mongol folk-tradition that they were descended from Gog and Magog. He also addressed many minds (Westerners or otherwise) being credulous of the notion that Mongols might be Captive Jews, but after weighing the pros and cons, he concluded this was an open question. (Note: Riccoldo observed that the Mongol script resembled Chaldean (Syriac, a form of Aramaic), and in fact it does derive from Aramaic. However, he saw that Mongols bore no physical resemblance to Jews and were ignorant of Jewish laws.)

The Flemish Franciscan friar William of Rubruck, who was first-hand witness to Alexander's supposed wall in Derbent on the shores of the Caspian Sea in 1254, (Note: Rubruck refers Derbent as the "Iron Gate", this also being the meaning of the Turkish name (Demir kapi) for the town. Rubruck may have been the only medieval Westerner to claim to have seen it.) identified the people the walls were meant to fend off only vaguely as "wild tribes" or "desert nomads", (Note: Also "barbarous nations", "savage tribes".) but one researcher made the inference Rubruck must have meant Jews, (Note: Based on Rubruck stating elsewhere "There are other enclosures in which there are Jews") and that he was speaking in the context of "Gog and Magog". (Note: Since Roger Bacon, having been informed by Rubruck, urged the study of geography to discover where the Antichrist and Gog and Magog might be found.) Confined Jews were later to be referred to as "Red Jews" (die roten Juden) in German-speaking areas; a term first used in a Holy Grail epic dating to the 1270s, in which Gog and Magog were two mountains enclosing these people. (Note: Albrecht von Scharfenberg, Der jüngere Titurel. It belongs in the Arthurian cycle.)

The author of the Travels of Sir John Mandeville, a 14th-century best-seller, said he had found these Jews in Central Asia where as Gog and Magog they had been imprisoned by Alexander, plotting to escape and join with the Jews of Europe to destroy Christians.

In the Borgia map, a copper-engraved world map probably produced in Southern Germany c. 1430, the most eastern part contains two fortified regions depicting Gog and Magog, with the following Latin inscriptions:

- Provincia gog, in qua fuerunt iudei inclusi tempore artaxersis regis persarum.

The province of Gog, in which the Jews were confined during the time of Artaxerxes, king of the Persians.

- Magog in istis duabus sunt gentes magni et gigantes pleni omnium malorum morum. Quos iudeos artaxersex collexit de omnibus partibus persarum.

Magog – in these two are large people and giants who are full of all kinds of bad behaviors. These Jews were collected by Artaxerxes from all parts of Persia.

The Persian king Artaxerxes (either Artaxerxes I or Artaxerxes II, appearing in the Book of Ezra 7) was commonly confused in medieval Europe with the Neo-Assyrian ruler Shalmaneser V, who according to 2 Kings 17 drove the Ten Lost Tribes of Israel into exile.

=== Kievan Rus ===
The twelfth-century chronicle Primary Chronicle posited that the people of Kievan Rus' were descendants of the biblical Japheth, son of Noah, and of the tribe of Magog. According to political scientist Christopher Marsh, "the implications" of being descendants of the tribe of Magog, depicted as being thrown out of heaven in the biblical Revelation of John, "apparently didn't matter to those drawing" the connection who believed that "[a]ncestors were found in the Bible, and that was enough", allegedly making the Rus' a chosen people of the Christian God.

== Modern apocalypticism ==
In the early 19th century, some Hasidic rabbis identified the French invasion of Russia under Napoleon as "The War of Gog and Magog". But as the century progressed, apocalyptic expectations receded as the populace in Europe began to adopt an increasingly secular worldview. This has not been the case in the United States, where a 2002 poll indicated that 59% of Americans believed the events predicted in the Book of Revelation would come to pass. During the Cold War the idea that Soviet Russia had the role of Gog gained popularity, since Ezekiel's words describing him as "prince of Meshek" – rosh meshek in Hebrew – sounded suspiciously like Russia and Moscow. Ronald Reagan also took up the idea.

Some post-Cold War millennialists still identify Gog with Russia, but they now tend to stress its allies among Islamic nations, especially Iran. For the most fervent, the countdown to Armageddon began with the return of the Jews to Israel, followed quickly by further signs pointing to the nearness of the final battle – nuclear weapons, European integration, the Israeli annexation of East Jerusalem in the Six-Day War in 1967, and the Yom Kippur War in 1973 plus America's wars in Afghanistan and in the Persian Gulf region.

George W. Bush tried to convince Jacques Chirac to join the invasion of Iraq based on apocalyptic ideas, and that "Gog and Magog are at work" in the Middle East.

In the Islamic apocalyptic tradition, the end of the world would be preceded by the release of Gog and Magog, whose destruction by God in a single night would usher in the Day of Resurrection. Reinterpretation did not generally continue after Classical times, but the needs of the modern world have produced a new body of apocalyptic literature in which Gog and Magog are identified as Israel and the USA. One problem these writers have had to confront is the barrier holding Gog and Magog back, which is not to be found in the modern world: the answer varies, some writers saying that Gog and Magog were the Mongols empire or the Soviet Union's and the Communist China plus that the wall is now gone, others say that both the wall and Gog and Magog are invisible.

== See also ==
- Gog (film)
- Alexander the Great in the Quran
- Cyrus the Great in the Quran
- Eschatology
- Hag and Mag in Mandaeism
- Koka and Vikoka in Hinduism
- Magog
- Sasanian defense lines
