= Sambation =

Legendary river from rabbinic literature

Coordinates: 47°3′31″N 24°25′45″E

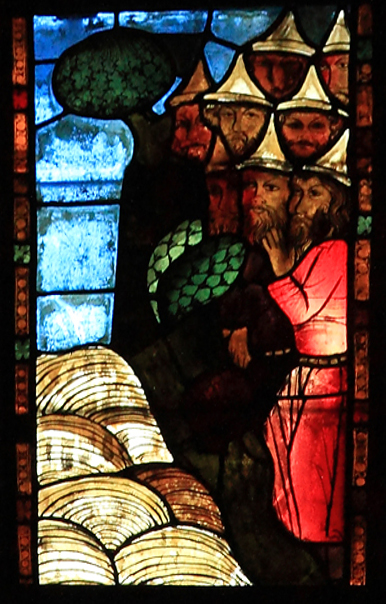
Detail of choir windows in St Mary's church, Frankfurt (Oder), Germany (c. 1360s). The Red Jews wait at the banks of the river Sambation.

According to rabbinic literature, the Sambation (Hebrew: סמבטיון) is the river beyond which the Ten Lost Tribes of Israel were exiled by the Assyrian king Shalmaneser V (Sanchairev).

== Location ==
In the earliest references, such as the Targum Pseudo-Jonathan, the river is given no particular attributes, but later literature claims that it rages with rapids and throws up stones six days a week, or even consists entirely of stone, sand and flame. For those six days the Sambation is impossible to cross, but it stops flowing every Shabbat, the day Jews are not allowed to travel; some writers say this is the origin of the name.

Pliny the Elder, writing in the mid-1st century, mentions that there is a river in Judaea that dries up every Shabbat (NH xxxi.18). His younger contemporary Josephus writes of the Sabbatical River (Σαββατικον) that he claims was called after "the sacred seventh day of the Jews" and that he locates between Arka (in the northern Lebanon range) and Raphanea (in Upper Syria) (War 7.96-99), although according to his account it is dry for six days and flows only on Shabbat. The river is believed by some to be an intermittent spring now called Fuwar ed-Deir. Others have said it is an active volcano (which explains the rapids, stones, fire and smoke) which rests on the Sabbath.

In 1280, Abraham Abulafia (1240 – c. 1291), a mystic and Kabbalist, set out to find the Sambation. Nahmanides identifies the Sambation with the Guzana River mentioned in II Kings, located in Syria.

An Ashkenazi tradition speaks of the Lost Tribes as di Royte Yiddelekh, "The little Red Jews", cut off from the rest of Jewry by the legendary river Sambation, "whose foaming waters raise high up into the sky a wall of fire and smoke that is impossible to pass through".

Obadiah Bartenura writes that he was informed by Adeni Jews in Jerusalem that they had heard from Muslim merchants that the river was located about fifty days' walking distance from their place as one journeys through the desert. The river, which flows with rocks for six days a week, completely surrounded a land inhabited by Jews who could not ever leave, for by doing so, Shabbat would be desecrated. These Jews were all the offspring of Moses and were as holy as angels and sinless.

== In literature ==
The Sambation was a popular subject in medieval literature; for instance, some versions of the Alexander Romance have Alexander the Great encounter the river on his travels.

In modern literature, the Sambation appears prominently in Umberto Eco's novel Baudolino, whose protagonists manage to cross the raging river of stones and find on the other side, not the Lost Ten Tribes, but the Kingdom of Prester John of Christian myth.

In 1929, Yiddish-writing author Lazar Borodulin published one of the very few Yiddish science fiction novels, Yiddish: אויף יענער זייט סמבטיון : וויסענשאפטליכער און פאנטאסטישער ראמאן, romanized: Oyf yener zayt sambatyun, visnshaftlekher un fantastisher roman (On the other side of the Sambation, a scientific and fantastic novel), a novel in the "lost world" genre, written in a Jewish perspective. In the novel a journalist meets a mad scientist with a ray gun in the land of the Red Jews.

== See also ==
- Ramlat al-Sab'atayn
