= Red Jews =

Legendary Jewish nation

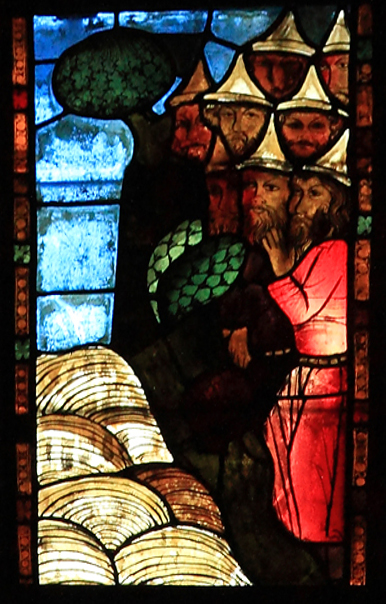
Detail of choir windows in St Mary's church, Frankfurt (Oder) (c. 1360s). The Red Jews wait at the banks of the river Sambation.

The Red Jews (German: Rote Juden) were a folkloric and legendary Jewish nation, appearing in vernacular sources in Germany during the medieval era, from the 13th to the 15th centuries. These texts portray the Red Jews as an epochal threat to Christendom, and a force which would invade Europe during the tribulations leading to the end of the world.

A variant counter-story became an element of Yiddish folklore in the 15th century at the latest. Here the red Jews, the royte yidn, were lost tribes and poised to protect the Yiddish Jews from Christian violence. The earliest known references to the counter-story are in German-language reminiscences of Jewish life by converts to Christianity beginning in 1508. The Red Jews are a popular theme in later Yiddish literature, undergoing various mutations—including ultimately e.g. late 19th century and 20th century Zionist versions as a heroic warrior diaspora.

Andrew Gow studied the original German language texts and concluded the legend of the Red Jews conflated three separate traditions: the biblical prophetic references to Gog and Magog, the Ten Lost Tribes of Israel, and an episode from the Alexander Romance (3rd century AD), in which Alexander the Great encloses a race of heathens behind a great wall in the Caucasus. These traditions had some overlap already; Gog and Magog are among the nations trapped behind the wall in the Alexander Romance, and the only ones named in the version of the story appearing in Quran Sura al-Kahf (The Cave) 18:89, while the 14th-century work The Travels of Sir John Mandeville explicitly associates the confined nations with the Ten Lost Tribes.

Many pamphlets circulated interpreting such events as the rise of Turkish power in the context of the legendary Red Jews. Both Martin Bucer and Philipp Melanchthon (1497–1560), for example, claimed that Muslims were the Red Jews.

== See also ==
- Lazar Borodulin § On the Other Side of Sambatyon
