= Step'anos of Siwnik' =

Armenian Christian bishop (680–735)

Step'anos of Siwnik (680–735) was an Armenian Christian bishop. He is known to have at least two writings, one a commentary on the Book of Genesis and the other an Armenian translation of the Apocalypse of Methodius.
