= Lazar Borodulin =

Jewish American Yiddish author

Lazar Borodulin (April 24, 1879 – March 21, 1947) was a Jewish American writer and essayist, writing primarily in Yiddish. He is known as an author of one of the very few science fiction novels written in Yiddish.

Lazar Borodulin was born in Genichesk, Crimea, Russian Empire. In 1900s or 1910s he emigrated to the United States where he started writing popular science articles in various Yiddish outlets, such as Varhayt (Truth), Tog (Day), Tsukunft (Future), Fraynd (Friend, a publication of The Workers Circle), and Gerekhtikeyt (Justice). His works include two books:

- On the other side of the Sambation, a scientific and fantastic novel, Yiddish: אויף יענער זייט סמבטיון : וויסענשאפטליכער און פאנטאסטישער ראמאן, romanized: Oyf yener zayt sambatyun, visnshaftlekher un fantastisher roman (New York, 1929)
- Milkhomes un antisemitizm (Wars and anti-Semitism) (New York, 1937).

== On the Other Side of Sambatyon ==
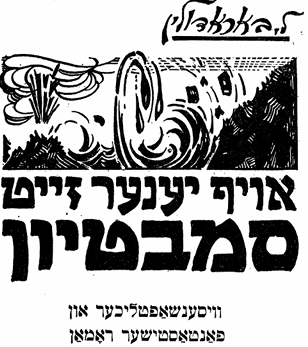
The title page of Oyf yener zayt sambatyun

On the Other Side of Sambatyon (1929) is one of a very few works of science fiction (Note: Irving Howe incorrectly describes Borodulin as "the first, perhaps the last, author of science fiction in Yiddish".) written in Yiddish. It is a "lost world"/"mad scientist"-type story grounded in the Talmudic lore about Ten Lost Tribes.

=== Plot ===
The novel starts with a married couple visiting a Yiddish reporter Hofman worried about a missing red-haired girl. It turns out she disappeared together with a scientist named Berger who invented a ray gun, and Hofman embarks on a quest to find the scientist. It turns out that Berger found his way to the land of mysterious Red Jews beyond the legendary river Sambation. Its legendary inaccessibility is explained in the novel by the fact that it is made of a chain of constantly erupting geysers. The middle third of the book describes technical and social advancements of the Red Jews, the rest is a quest to and from and a love story.
