= Children of Moses =

Legendary Jewish tribe

Children of Moses (Hebrew: בני משה) were legendary descendants of Moses who lived beyond the mythical River Sambation. Most of information about them come from Arabic sources (where they are called Banu Musa), of whom Eldad ha-Dani is believed to be the main source.

Encyclopedia Britannica writes: "Eldad describes the Children of Moses, a powerful and Utopian race, whose territory is surrounded by a wonderful river." Eldad also wrote that a cloud brought the Children of Moses across Sambation at the times of the destruction of the Temple and the river protects them and they are happy, virtuous and long-living.

Steven Wasserstrom remarks that Eldad is not trustworthy as a historical source, but there is an evidence that the motifs of Sambation and "Children of Moses" had currency in the 8th century.

== Letter from the children of Moses ==
Of note is a "Letter from the children of Moses" surfaced in mid-17th century, an episode from the numerous searches of the Ten Lost Tribes. The Letter was accompanied with the following story. A certain R. Baruch Gad, an emissary from Jerusalem to Persia was robbed on his way and after long wandering he met a warrior from the tribe of Naphtali. Eventually he gave Baruch a letter for him to deliver to Jerusalem, from the Children of Moses, signed by "King Ahitub b. Azaryah, the nasi (prince) Jehozadak b. Uzza, and the elder Uriel b. Abisaf" (Adolf Neubauer spell "King Ahitub, son of Azariah; the prince Yehozadak, son of Ozer; and the Elder, Uriel, son of Aliasap"). Neubauer presents a different, a more detailed and romantic story of the adventures of R. Baruch, allegedly told by R. Baruch's servant, and a detailed summary of the letter. Several rabbis of Jerusalem attested the authenticity of the letter and several certified copies were prepared. The letter said in part:

Why do we not do battle with the nations? You shall know that we, the tribes of the sons of Moses, are unable to cross the river [Sambation] until the end of days when the Lord will say to the prisoners, Go forth; to them that are in darkness, Shew yourselves.

In 19th century Jacob Saphir cautiously questioned the authenticity of the letter: he hinted that while it was allegedly coming from the people who went into the exile before the destruction of the First Temple, the letters and the Hebrew style were not that old.
