= Apocalypse of Pseudo-Methodius =

7th-century Syriac Christian text

Written in Syriac in the late seventh century, the Apocalypse of Pseudo-Methodius shaped and influenced Christian eschatological thinking in the Middle Ages. Pseudepigraphically attributed to Methodius of Olympus, a fourth century Church Father, the work attempts to make sense of the Islamic conquest of the Near East.

Pseudo-Methodius is noted for incorporating numerous pre-existing aspects of Christian eschatology, such as the invasion of Gog and Magog, the rise of the Antichrist, and the tribulations that precede the end of the world. The book, however, adds a new element to Christian eschatology: the rise of a messianic Last Roman emperor. This element would remain in Christian apocalyptic literature until the end of the medieval period.

The book was early translated into Greek, Latin, Coptic, Armenian, and later into Slavonic. It is an apocalyptic text, the most famous of the Syriac apocalyptic texts.

== Authorship, date, location ==
Pseudo-Methodius is attributed to Methodius of Olympus in the Syriac text, of Patara in the Greek, both of whom lived in the fourth century. In all likelihood, however, the text was actually written in the final decade of the seventh century, after 692, by a Miaphysite Christian. Scholars have argued that the work was written in the context of the Arab Conquests, in response to the hardships faced by Christians and their widespread apostasy (in order to avoid the jizya head tax). As well, the author sees the invasion occurring as punishment from God. The text, therefore, employs historiography, geography, and apocalyptic prophecy.

The text was originally written in Syriac, in Northern Syria. The author claims to have had his vision on Mount Sinjar. Early scholarship relied heavily on the Greek, Latin, and Slavonic translations for study, as the original Syriac text was not available at the time. In 1897, the scholar V. Istrin relied heavily on the Greek text; at the same time and independently, Sackur studied the oldest Latin translations. Both of their studies ushered in the scholarly study of Pseudo-Methodius, but it was not until 1931 that the original Syriac manuscript was discovered. With this find, Michael Kmosko was able to ascertain that the original Apocalypse of Pseudo-Methodius had been written in the Syriac language.

== Content ==
Pseudo-Methodius is indebted to earlier Syriac works, including the Cave of Treasures, the Julian Romance and the Syriac Alexander Romance.

Pseudo-Methodius begins with a history of the world, starting with Adam and Eve in the Garden of Eden, through to the Muslim conquests, and into the end-times. One notable feature of the work is the presence of sexuality with regards to Christian behavior in the end days—specifically discussing swinging, homosexuality, and cross-dressing as indicators of a sinful society. It is only then that the text says the "sons of Ishmael", that is Muslims, will emerge from the desert of Ethribus to inflict God's punishment upon the Christians who "slipped into depravity". Pseudo-Methodius also recounts the events that took place at the hands of Muslims in the previous decades. In invoking figures in other Christian eschatological literature, such as Gog and Magog, Pseudo-Methodius attempts to legitimize his place as a fourth century Church Father. The manuscript also notes the rise of an Emperor-Saviour figure, echoing the fourth century AD prophecy attributed to the legendary Tiburtine Sibyl. This Roman emperor will save the Christian lands from "the sons of Ishmael", place his crown upon the cross "for the sake of the common salvation of all", thereby saving Christendom as a whole. The work is notable for its vivid descriptions and its brutality. Descriptions of drinking the blood of cattle, stabbing pregnant women, and feeding babies to animals permeate throughout the author's work.

Ballard notes, however, that Pseudo-Methodius deviates from previous eschatological literature, such as Revelation, in that Pseudo-Methodius utilizes Roman emperors as agents of change. Guenther notes that Pseudo-Methodius was influenced by the books Revelation and Daniel, maintaining the lineage of Christian literature. This is an important feature, as it shows that the author was most likely a Christian cleric, and was familiar with past Christian writings. By introducing new features into Christian literature while keeping core Christian beliefs and teachings intact, the author helped to make Pseudo-Methodius accessible to the laity as well. Part of the Pseudo-Methodius's influence is attributed to its ability to reflect the beliefs of contemporary Eastern Roman citizens; they are merely acting out foretold events, and mankind is bound with the fate of the empire and the capital.

== Historical context ==
Rome and Sassanid Persia had been at war with one another for much of the first quarter of the seventh century. With both empires still feeling the effects of such a long series of battles, an Arab threat took advantage of the weakening empires. The Persians faced defeat west of the Euphrates in Qadisiyya in what Griffith calls "the beginning of the demise of both Roman and Persian rule for good". This demise would continue throughout the 630s and 640s, as the Arabs conquered much of the Middle East and the Mediterranean world. In 635, Damascus fell, Jerusalem and Antioch followed in 637, Edessa in 640, Alexandria in 642, and Seleucia/Ctesiphon in 645. Three out of the five patriarchates of Roman Christendom were under Arab Muslim rule. In 674, the Umayyad Caliph Muawiyah launched a land and sea assault on Constantinople. Within three years, he was defeated, and turned his attention on the rest of the surviving Roman Empire, namely the Middle East, Greece, and the Balkans. As Ballard notes, Constantinople was "reduced to a small Christian enclave within an ocean of Islam."

A campaign by the new Muslim rulers was set in place in order to remove any public display of Christian symbolism, through the construction of Islamic-styled buildings and the issuance of coins declaring an Islamic triumph. The most dramatic of such constructions was the Dome of the Rock in Jerusalem. The inscriptions on the Dome of the Rock are taken from the Quran and "proclaim the arrival of a powerful empire that was founded on pure monotheist belief." This, as Ballard and Griffith both note, was because Muslims considered Christians' belief in the trinity, as well as their supposed worship of the Virgin Mary and the Saints, to be polytheistic.

To defend themselves and without any real power or authority, Christians turned to writing. The hardships Christians faced in a Muslim territory caused a "literary awakening", and the earliest of these texts were written in Syriac, Greek, and Arabic. Syriac writers in particular reacted to their world in apocalyptic terms – the fall of their Christian empire was continuing with each Muslim conquest, and Syriac writers saw these conquests as a punishment from God. The most well-known of these texts was Pseudo-Methodius.

== Translations ==
There are few Syriac manuscripts, and many are fragmentary. The most complete text is from 1586, although there are earlier manuscripts and references found in the 13th-century Book of the Bee. By the early 8th century, Pseudo-Methodius was translated into Greek, and subsequently, from Greek into Latin. The earliest Latin witness is a codex dated to 727 AD. There are three other Latin manuscripts from the 8th century. The Latin translation was made by a certain Petrus Monachus in Francia. There was also seemingly a Coptic translation available by the 8th century, known only from a fragment on papyrus. All the available Greek and Syriac manuscripts, however, are late. There are over 100 Greek copies, but most of them post-date 1453. An abridged Armenian translation from the Greek, attributed to Step'anos of Siwnik', is attested in a few late manuscripts; it may derive from a translation of the full text, the existence of which is suggested by various quotation in Armenian works, but no copy survives.

The Greek text of Pseudo-Methodius is traditionally divided into four recensions: G^{1}, G^{2}, G^{3} and G^{4}, with G^{1} subdivided into G^{1a}, G^{1b} and G^{1c}. The Latin and Slavonic translations are both based on G^{1}. The Slavonic versions are divided between three recensions, S^{1}, S^{2}, and S^{3}. The earliest Slavonic manuscript is from the 12th century. There are four Latin recensions found across about 220 manuscripts. The first and second recensions account for about 50 and 150 manuscripts, respectively. The second and third Latin recensions are heavily abridged.

== Spread and influence ==
In Byzantine eschatology, Pseudo-Methodius marks the end of antiquity and the beginning of the Middle Ages. The document was frequently copied and readapted, in order to fit the cataclysmic events that occurred in a particular area and at a particular time. It was invoked by Christians throughout the centuries in order to explain the turmoil they faced in their respective time and place. It shaped Western Christendom's view of Islam through the Middle Ages, through various re-adaptions and translations.

After Norman conquest of England in 1066, the hitherto unpopular Pseudo-Methodius gained in popularity; one of the earliest English texts to explain the invasion of "heathens" on a Christian land included the Apocalypse of Pseudo-Methodius.

The spread and influence of Pseudo-Methodius was so far reaching that, during the Mongol invasions of the 13th century, Russian Christians invoked the work of Pseudo-Methodius in order to explain the onslaught by using the historical and geographical explanations found within the text. Christians believed Pseudo-Methodius had predicted the Mongols' arrival because of their lifestyle, dietary habits, and activities.

With the fall of more Christian cities from the fourteenth century onwards, along with the fall of Constantinople in 1453, the Apocalypse of Pseudo-Methodius was invoked once again.

== Modern use ==
Griffith notes, because of questions surrounding the historicity of the Apocalypse of Pseudo-Methodius, it is easy to dismiss the piece outright. However, for the historian, Pseudo-Methodius sheds light on the environment of the age, and therefore the literature is still relevant. Furthermore, the literature is important because of the anonymity of its author. In a sense, this anonymity makes the work akin to "underground literature". Furthermore, the Apocalypse of Pseudo-Methodius allowed the population, regardless of locale, to maintain a "sense of seemingly rightful superiority", despite evidence to the contrary.

== Sources ==
- Alexander, P. J. (1985). Byzantine Apocalyptic Traditions. Berkeley: University of California Press.
- Ballard, Martin (2011). End-timers: Three-thousand Years of Waiting for Judgment Day. Santa Barbara: Praeger.
- Bonura, Christopher (2016). "A Forgotten Translation of Pseudo-Methodius in Eighth-Century Constantinople: New Evidence for the Dispersal of the Greek Apocalypse of Pseudo-Methodius during the Dark Age Crisis". In Nicholas S.M. Matheou; Theofili Kampianaki; Lorenzo M. Bondioli (eds.). From Constantinople to the Frontier: The City and the Cities. Brill. pp. 260–276. doi:10.1163/9789004307742_018. ISBN 9789004307742.
- Brock, Sebastian (1997). A Brief Outline of Syriac Literature. Kottyam: St Ephrem's Ecumenical Research Institute.
- Cross, Samuel H. (1929). "The Earliest Allusion in Slavic Literature to the Revelations of Pseudo-Methodius". Speculum. 4 (3): 329–339. doi:10.2307/2849558. JSTOR 2849558. S2CID 162384162.
- Debié, Muriel (2005). "Muslim-Christian Controversy in an Unedited Syriac Text Revelations and Testimonies About Our Lord's Dispensation". Muslim-Christian Controversy in an Unedited Syriac Text: Revelations and Testimonies about Our Lord's Dispensation. Vol. 5. pp. 225–236. doi:10.1163/ej.9789004149380.i-338.40. ISBN 9789047408826.
- Garstad, Benjamin ed. and trans. (2012). Apocalypse of Pseudo-Methodius. An Alexandrian World Chronicle. Cambridge: Harvard University Press. ISBN 978-0674053076.
- Griffith, Sidney Harrison (2008). The Church in the Shadow of the Mosque: Christians and Muslims in the World of Islam. Princeton: Princeton University Press. ISBN 9780691130156.
- Griffith, Sidney Harrison (2010). "Christians Under Muslim Rule" in The Cambridge History of Christianity, Volume 3. Cambridge: Cambridge University Press.
- Grifoni, Cinzia; Gantner, Clemens (2020). "The Third Latin Recension of the Revelationes of Pseudo-Methodius". In Veronika Wieser; Vincent Eltschinger; Johann Heiss (eds.). Cultures of Eschatology. Vol. 1: Empires and Scriptural Authorities in Medieval Christian, Islamic and Buddhist Communities. DeGruyter. pp. 194–232.
- Guenther, Alan M. (May 2007). "The Christian experience and interpretation of the early Muslim conquest and rule". Islam and Christian-Muslim Relations.
- Jackson, Peter (November 2001). "Medieval Christendom's Encounter with the Alien". Historical Research. 74 (186): 347–369. doi:10.1111/1468-2281.00132. S2CID 159860524.
- Louth, Andrew (2010). "Byzantium Transforming (600-700)" in The Cambridge History of the Byzantine Empire c.500-1492. Cambridge: Cambridge University Press.
- Pelle, Stephen (September 2009). "The Revelationes of Pseudo-Methodius and 'Concerning the Coming of Antichrist' in British Library MS Cotton Vespasian D.XIV". Notes and Queries. 56 (3): 324–330. doi:10.1093/notesj/gjp125.
- Penn, Michael Philip (2015). When Christians First Met Muslims: A Sourcebook of the Earliest Syriac Writings on Islam. University of California Press.
- Pollard, Richard M. (2010). "One Other on Another" in Difference and Identity in Francia and Medieval France. Burlington, VT: Ashgate Publishing.
- Shepard, Jonathan (2010). "Introduction to 'Approaching Byzantium'". The Cambridge History of the Byzantine Empire c.500-1492. Cambridge: Cambridge University Press.
- Bonura, Christopher J. (2025). A Prophecy of Empire: The Apocalypse of Pseudo-Methodius from Late Antique Mesopotamia to the Global Medieval Imagination. Vol. 15 (1 ed.). University of California Press. ISBN 9780520418257.
