= Vaticinium ex eventu =

Prophecy recorded after the fact

Vaticinium ex eventu (Classical Latin: [wäːt̪ɪˈkɪnɪ.ʊ̃ˑ ɛks eːˈwɛn̪t̪uː], "prophecy from the event") or post eventum ("after the event") is a technical theological or historiographical term referring to a prophecy written after the author already had information about the events being "foretold". The text is written so as to appear that the prophecy had taken place before the event, when in fact it was written after the events supposedly predicted. Vaticinium ex eventu is a form of hindsight bias. The concept is similar to postdiction.

== Examples ==
=== In religious writings ===
The Babylonian "Marduk Prophecy", a text describing the travels of the Marduk idol from Babylon, "prophesies" of the statue's seizure during the sack of the city by Mursilis I in 1531 BC, Assyria, when Tukulti-Ninurta I overthrew Kashtiliash IV in 1225 BC and took the idol to Assur, and Elam, when Kudur-Nahhunte ransacked the city and pilfered the statue around 1160 BC. A copy was found in the House of the Exorcist at Assur, whose contents date from 713–612 BC and is closely related thematically to another vaticinium ex eventu text called the Shulgi prophecy, which probably followed it in a sequence of tablets. Both compositions present a favorable view of Assyria.

The Book of Daniel utilizes vaticinium ex eventu, by its seeming foreknowledge of events from Alexander the Great's conquest up to the persecution of Antiochus IV Epiphanes in the summer of 164 BC. (Note: Daniel) The stories of the first half are legendary in origin, and the visions of the second the product of anonymous authors in the Maccabean period (2nd century BC). Its inclusion in Ketuvim (Writings) rather than Nevi'im (Prophets) was likely because it appeared after the canon for those books had closed, and the dominant view among Jews and scholars is that Daniel is not in any case a prophetic book but an apocalypse.

Statements attributed to Jesus in the Gospels that foretell the destruction of Jerusalem (e.g., Mark 13:14, Luke 21:20) and its Second Temple are considered to be examples of vaticinia ex eventu by the great majority of Biblical scholars (with regard to the siege of Jerusalem in AD 70, in which the Second Temple was destroyed). However, there are some scholars who only see the verses from Luke as constituting a vaticinium ex eventu (and those of Mark not), while a few even go as far as to deny that the verses from Luke refer to the destruction of the temple in AD 70.

=== Secular ===
- The Ancient world saw the technique of vaticinium ex eventu used by a wide variety of figures, from Pindar and Herodotus to Horace and Virgil.
- The Divine Comedy by Dante Alighieri includes a number of such prophecies of Dante's own exile from Florence.
- In Jerusalem Delivered, Torquato Tasso uses the vaticinium ex eventu trope in presaging the discovery of America by Christopher Columbus: "Un uom de la Liguria avrà ardimento / a l'incognito corso esporsi in prima"
- References in the late correspondence of Virginia Woolf to "how I love this savage medieval water [...] and myself so eliminated" are sometimes taken as presaging her suicide by drowning a few months later: the danger of vaticinium ex eventu has however also been observed.

== See also ==
- Eschatology
- Hindsight bias
- Parapsychology
- Precognition
- Prefiguration (theology)
- Preterism
