= William J. Cameron =

Writer for Henry Ford's Dearborn Independent

William James Cameron
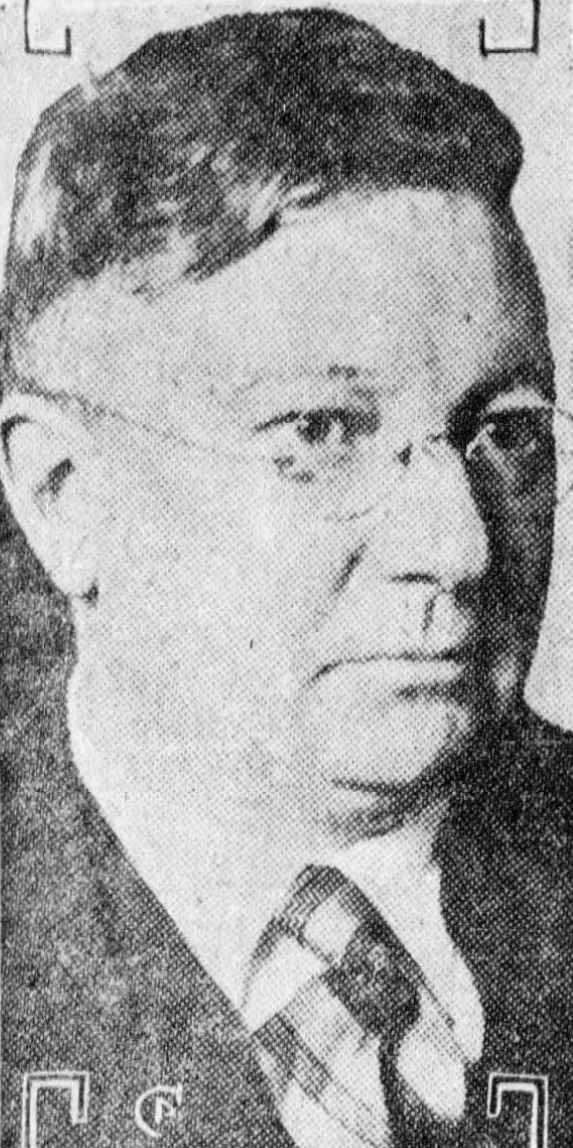
- Born: 1878
- Died: 1955 (aged 76–77)
- Other name: Billy
- Occupations: Editor, minister

William John ("Billy") Cameron (1878–1955) was a newspaper editor most well known for his work at The Dearborn Independent, owned by Henry Ford, where he was responsible for publishing a series of antisemitic articles known as The International Jew. He was influential in the British Israel movement, helping Howard Rand launch the Anglo-Saxon Federation of America.

== Early life ==
William J. Cameron was born in Hamilton, Ontario, in 1878. His family moved to Michigan for a brief time, but he returned to Canada for high school, and then some courses at the University of Toronto.

Gifted with a sonorous voice, Cameron had always wanted to be a preacher. On occasional Sundays, he would preach at the People's Church in Brooklyn, Michigan, a town where he also worked as a railroad timekeeper. He later preached at churches throughout Detroit.

In 1904, Cameron began working as a staff reporter at the Detroit News, eventually moving up to become chief editorial writer where he wrote an editorial column called Reflections.

== Working for Ford ==
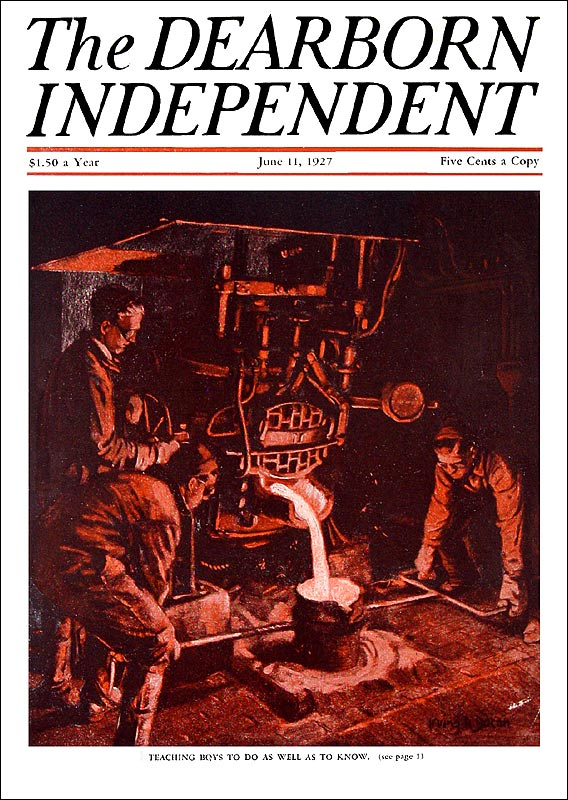
Dearborn independent 1927 06 11 a

After being recommended by E.G. Pipp, whom Cameron had worked for at the Detroit News, Henry Ford hired him to work for The Dearborn Independent, a newspaper Ford had purchased.

Working for the Dearborn Independent, Cameron was the principal writer of a series of antisemitic articles that were later published on a near weekly basis from May 22, 1920 until January 14, 1922. Pipp left the Dearborn Independent over the publishing of these articles, and Cameron became chief editor until the paper ceased publication in 1927. A selection of the articles were later published as a four volume set of booklets titled The International Jew.

The extent of Cameron's involvement with the publishing of The International Jew came to light as a result of a highly publicized libel suit against Ford filed by Aaron Sapiro in 1925. The suit was a response to another series of Independent articles, "Jewish Exploitation of Farmer Organizations". During the suit's trial in 1927, Cameron spent six-and-a-half days on the witness stand giving testimony that absolved Ford of any connection to the Independent's content and that as editor, it was Cameron who determined what was published. As a result of the libel suit, Ford agreed to cease publication of any antisemitic material and closed the paper in 1927.

From the mid-1920s to the early 1940s, Cameron also handled all of Ford's personal press relations.

Cameron also gave a weekly talk on The Ford Sunday Evening Hour, a radio program that ran from October 1934 until March 1942.

== British-Israelism ==
It is not known for certain when Cameron became interested in British Israelism, but author Michael Barkun speculates that he was raised in the tradition by his father.

Howard Rand had been an organizer for the British-Israel World Federation and in early 1930 he met with Cameron in Detroit to establish a new British-Israel group in the US: the Anglo-Saxon Federation of America. Cameron become the new organization's first president with Suite 601 of the Fox Building in Detroit as its headquarters. Detroit was the location of the Federation's first convention in May 1930.

Cameron was also a lay preacher and was known to give lectures on British Israelism. He gave lectures with titles such as "The Economic Law of God" and "Discourse on the Economic Law of Moses" that were later published by both The BIWF and the Anglo-Saxon Federation of America. The antisemitism of his lectures and sermons was more muted than his articles in the Independent. In 1933 he gave a series of lectures at The Dearborn Inn where he posited his view of the Bible as a racial book and that it was the story of the Anglo-Saxon race.

In 1935, Cameron became the director of Destiny, the publishing arm of the Anglo-Saxon Federation of America.

== Alcoholism ==
Mrs. Stanley Ruddiman, a friend of Henry Ford's, suggests that Cameron may have had a drinking problem as early as his days at the Detroit News, believing he started drinking there to be "one of the boys." By the time he started working for Ford, Cameron was most certainly an alcoholic. This made for some conflict with Ford, who was known to be a teetotaler. Ford had concern for Cameron and tried to help prevent him from drinking when he could, providing him an attendant, and medical care at Henry Ford Hospital. Ford viewed Cameron's alcoholism as an illness that could be cured. During the days of Prohibition, when Ford would find out about a place where Cameron was getting alcohol, Ford would have it closed down.

Cameron's drinking also caused friction with Howard Rand, who had run for Massachusetts state office on the Prohibition Party ticket. It is not clear whether Cameron's drinking problem caused the ultimate breach between them, but Cameron ceased to play a significant role in the Federation after the late 1930s, and the headquarters was moved from Detroit where Cameron lived, to Massachusetts where Rand was located.

== Unity Church ==
Seeking help and solace regarding her husband's drinking, Mrs. Cameron had turned to the Missouri-based Unity Church. Following the death of Henry Ford in 1947, Cameron quit drinking altogether, left British-Israelism, and joined Unity Church.

He eventually entered the Unity ministry and in 1949 moved to Oakland, California as an assistant minister, a position he held until his death in 1955.

== Books ==
- Economics of the Bible

== Bibliography ==
- Baldwin, Neil (2001). Henry Ford and the Jews: The Mass Production of Hate. PublicAffairs. ISBN 1-891620-52-5.
- Barkun, Michael (1997). Religion and the Racist Right: the Origins of the Christian Identity Movement. University of North Carolina Press. ISBN 0-8078-2328-7.

== Additional sources ==
- The Reminiscences of Mr. Fred L. Black https://cdm15889.contentdm.oclc.org/digital/collection/p15889coll2/id/2393/
