= C. O. Stadsklev =

American British Israelism and Christian Identity minister

Carl Oliver Stadsklev
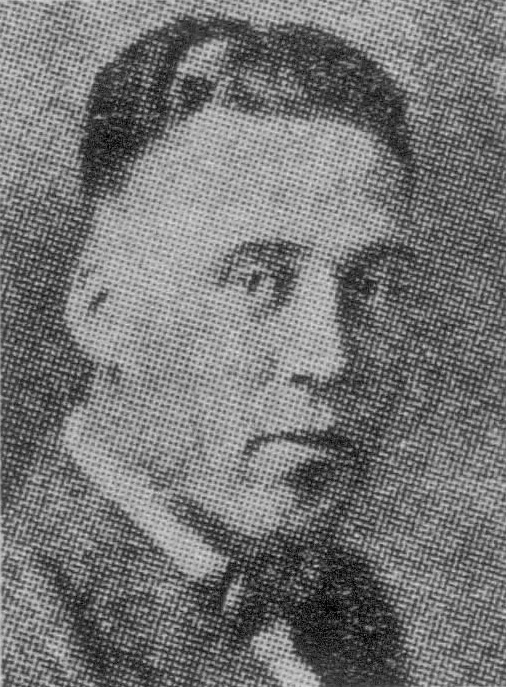
- Stadsklev in 1934
- Born: February 21, 1902; Lily, South Dakota
- Died: November 19, 1990 (aged 88); Minneapolis, Minnesota
- Occupation: Pastor
- Known for: British Israelism

Carl Oliver Stadsklev (February 21, 1902 – November 19, 1990) was an American British Israelism and Christian Identity minister who pastored the Gospel Temple in Hopkins, Minnesota. He promoted his views through his radio program, America's Hope.

Stadsklev was the founder of the National Association of Kingdom Evangelicals. He was an associate of Gerald L. K. Smith, who helped promote and encourage Stadsklev.

== Background ==
Carl Oliver Stadsklev was born February 21, 1902 in Lily, South Dakota. Originally a minister in the Christian and Missionary Alliance, Stadsklev was pastor of the Alliance Branch in Waubay, South Dakota. He left the Christian and Missionary Alliance as he began to believe the divine message was for the nation, not the individual. He began to accept the beliefs of British Israelism, believing that the Anglo-Saxon, Celtic, Nordic, and related peoples of Northern and Western Europe were the descendants of ancient Israel.

In Minneapolis, Stadsklev started the Truth and Liberty Temple to preach his message. He began a radio ministry and published a monthly journal, Truth and Liberty Magazine, to carry his message across the country.

In a 1936 interview published in the American Jewish World, Stadsklev blamed Jews for World War I, and that their "crafty propaganda in movies and theaters" would lead to the destruction of Christianity.

Stadsklev saw the United States as having a special scheme in the prophetic plan of God, being the eschatological embodiment of the promised Zion. He believed the Soviet Union was the primary enemy of God's people and that it would eventually attack the United States with an air armada. In his sermons, he complained that "Communists are Jews and Jews are Communists". Anticommunist Elizabeth Dilling was invited to speak in his church following her first indictment for sedition.

Stadsklev opposed what he referred to as the "Babylonian money system" supporting the US economy, instead advocating for a system of interest free lending backed by the government rather than gold.

Stadsklev promoted his views through the National Association of Kingdom Evangelicals, The Gospel Temple, his radio program America's Hope, and circulation of his writings and tapes. Christian Identity minister Sheldon Emry first heard the Identity message from Stadsklev and Emry became a member of Stadsklev's church.

Stadsklev died in Minnesota, November 19, 1990, at the age of 88.

== National Association of Kingdom Evangelicals ==
Stadsklev founded the National Association of Kingdom Evangelicals, a British Israel alliance similar to Howard Rand's Anglo-Saxon Federation of America. The National Association is generally conservative and orthodox in its belief. Unlike other British Israel groups, the NAKE was trinitarian, a doctrine not held by similar groups. However, it maintained a racial view of God's chosen people.

The association reportedly had seven autonomous churches across the United States. It would hold an annual conference at its site in Minnetonka, Minnesota.

== Association with Gerald L. K. Smith ==
Gerald L. K. Smith wrote about his association with Stadsklev in his autobiography, Besieged Patriot. Stadsklev sponsored Smith for a speaking engagement in Minneapolis, where Smith preached at Stadsklev's church. Smith referred to Stadsklev as "a courageous and intelligent student of Holy Scripture" who was not afraid to introduce Smith to his congregation.

In 1944, Stadsklev's radio program on WDGY was taken off the air. Despite a protest campaign organized by Smith and his America First Party, the station noted that they receive more calls commending their decision than opposing it. When the station gave Stadsklev two weeks notice of his cancellation, he quit immediately to make it appear that he had been shut down without notice. Station manager Lee Whiting stated that they had planned to cancel Stadsklev after eight years of broadcasting when his contract ran out, but credited Billboard with insisting Stadsklev be cancelled immediately.

== Works ==
- America in the Kingdom Parables. America's Hope, 1959, 91 pp.
- A Scriptural Money System. Hopkins, MN: Truth and Liberty Temple, 1945, 32 pp.
- Our Christian Beginnings. Hopkins, MN: America's Hope Broadcasts, n.d. 15 pp.
- Personal Salvation. Hopkins, MN: America's Hope, n.d. 18 pp.
- Tracing the Isaac-Sons -- Anglo-Saxons. Hopkins, MN: Americas Hope Broadcasts, n.d.
- The United States is Zion of Bible Prophecy. Hopkins, MN: Gospel Temple, 1955, 97 pp.
- What Happened at Calvary. Hopkins, MN: America's Hope, n.d. 27 pp.
