= Franklin Prophecy =

Antimsemitic canard falsely attributed to Benjamin Franklin

The Franklin Prophecy, sometimes called the Franklin Forgery, is an antisemitic speech falsely attributed to Benjamin Franklin, warning of the supposed dangers of admitting Jews to the nascent United States. The speech was purportedly transcribed by Charles Cotesworth Pinckney during the Constitutional Convention of 1787, but was unknown before its appearance in 1934 in the pages of William Dudley Pelley's Silver Legion pro-Nazi magazine Liberation. No evidence exists for the document's authenticity, and some of Pelley's claims have been disproven.

== Speech ==
The setting for the speech is a dinner table discussion purportedly recorded by Pinckney during the convention of the Continental Congress. Primarily, it is a polemic arguing against permitting Jewish immigration into the newly formed United States. The text is as follows:

There is a great danger for the United State of America. This great danger is the Jew. Gentlemen, in every land the Jews have settled, they have depressed the moral level and lowered the degree of commercial honesty. They have remained apart and unassimilated; oppressed, they attempt to strangle the nation financially, as in the case of Portugal and Spain.

For more than seventeen hundred years they have lamented their sorrowful fate—namely, that they have been driven out of their mother land; but, gentlemen, if the civilized world today should give them back Palestine and their property, they would immediately find pressing reason for not returning there. Why? Because they are vampires and vampires cannot live on other vampires—they cannot live among themselves. They must live among Christians and others who do not belong to their race.

If they are not expelled from the United States by the Constitution within less than one hundred years, they will stream into this country in such numbers that they will rule and destroy us and change our form of Government for which we Americans shed our blood and sacrificed our life, property and personal freedom. If the Jews are not excluded within two hundred years, our children will be working in the field to feed Jews while they remain in the counting houses, gleefully rubbing their hands.

I warn you, gentlemen, if you do not exclude the Jews forever, your children and your children's children will curse you in their graves. Their ideas are not those of Americans, even when they lived among us for ten generations. The leopard cannot change his spots. The Jews are a danger to this land, and if they are allowed to enter, they will imperil our institutions. They should be excluded by the Constitution.

== Authenticity ==
According to Pelley, Pinckney wrote that he had kept a journal of the convention. This journal has never been found, and no evidence exists for Pelley's claim that it was printed privately. The Franklin Institute has rejected Pelley's claims that it owns a manuscript copy of the speech.

The U.S. Congress report Anti-Semitism in Europe: Hearing Before the Subcommittee on European Affairs of the Committee on Foreign Relations (2004) states:

The Franklin "Prophecy" is a classic anti-Semitic canard that falsely claims that American statesman Benjamin Franklin made anti-Jewish statements during the Constitutional Convention of 1787. It has found widening acceptance in Muslim and Arab media, where it has been used to criticize Israel and Jews...

Franklin was a friend to the Jews of 18th-century America, and contributed toward the building of Philadelphia's first permanent synagogue. The Anti-Defamation League noted that the reference to the civilized world giving Palestine back to the Jews was an anachronism, since the modern Zionist movement did not arise until nearly a century after Franklin's death in 1790. Furthermore, the earliest usage of "[v]ampire" (vis-à-vis "vampyre") in the Oxford English Dictionary is 1796.

Similar antisemitic quotations have been attributed to George Washington and have been disproven. In 1790, in a marked sign of religious tolerance, Washington sent a letter to the Jewish community in Rhode Island, writing "May the Children of the Stock of Abraham, who dwell in this land, continue to merit and enjoy the good will of the other Inhabitants; while every one shall sit under his own vine and fig tree, and there shall be none to make him afraid."

== Usage ==
Despite having been repeatedly discredited since its first appearance, the "Prophecy" has proved a remarkably durable antisemitic canard. It has appeared most recently as a popular Internet hoax promulgated on Usenet groups and antisemitic websites, where it is presented as authentic. On February 18, 1998, a member of the Fatah Central Committee revived this myth, while mistakenly referring to Franklin as a former President of the United States. Osama bin Laden used this canard briefly in his October 2002 "Letter to the American People."

== See also ==
- Andinia Plan
- Antisemitic trope
- Blood libel
- Cultural Bolshevism
- Cultural Marxism conspiracy theory
- Doctors' plot
- Dreyfus affair
- The Eternal Jew (art exhibition)
- The Eternal Jew (book)
- The Eternal Jew (film)
- The Foundations of the Nineteenth Century
- The International Jew
- Jewish Bolshevism
- Jewish question
- Judeo-Masonic conspiracy theory
- Kosher tax conspiracy theory
- The Protocols of the Elders of Zion
- Reich Ministry of Public Enlightenment and Propaganda
- Rootless cosmopolitan
- Stab-in-the-back myth
- Well poisoning
- Zionist Occupation Government conspiracy theory
- Żydokomuna
