= Sheldon Emry =

Christian Identity minister and author

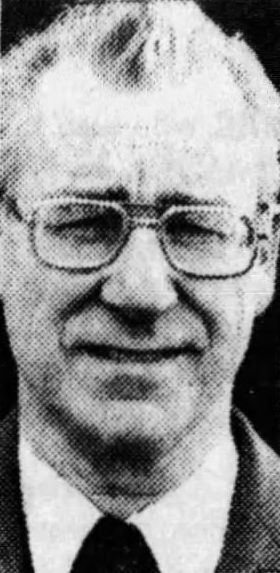
Emry in 1981

Sheldon Emry (July 4, 1926 – 1985) was a Christian Identity minister and the founder of America's Promise ministries.

== History ==
Sheldon Emry was born in Jump River, Wisconsin, on July 4, 1926. Following high school, Emry attended the state teachers college in Stevens Point, Wisconsin. He was drafted in 1945 and was trained as a cryptographer, serving in the US and the Philippines. Following military service, he worked in real estate.

While living in Minneapolis, he became active in the John Birch Society and other anti-communist groups. He became very active in showing anti-communist films to church and civic groups. However, he became discouraged with a lack of response from ministers, which led him to leave the Presbyterian church his family was attending.

At this time, he was introduced to C. O. Stadsklev, an Identity preacher in Minnetonka Hills, Minnesota. Stadsklev led a Christian Identity church known as The Gospel Temple. Stadsklev also led the National Association of Kingdom Evangelicals, a British Israelism alliance similar to Howard Rand's Anglo-Saxon Federation of America. Unlike other British Israel groups, the NAKE was trinitarian, a doctrine not held by similar groups. Stadsklev promoted his views through the NAKE, The Gospel Temple, and his radio program America's Hope. Stadsklev was an associate of Gerald L. K. Smith.

In the 1960s, Emry was the vice chairman of Christian Research, Inc. in Minneapolis, Minnesota.

In 1967, Emry accompanied Stadsklev on a two mission trips to Phoenix, Arizona and was encouraged to move there permanently in full-time Identity ministry.

Emry founded America's Promise Ministries in 1967 in Phoenix, Arizona. Later, through the church, he took over the America's Hope radio program previously established by Stadsklev, making it a daily program known as America's Promise Radio. The radio program was broadcast nationwide on more than 25 radio stations.

In 1972, Emry had raised enough money to purchase land in Arizona for a church building, and in 1975, broke ground for Lord's Covenant Church.

== Beliefs ==
Emry taught that the concept of the Rapture was a doctrine developed by Jesuits to disarm and distract Christians.

On Jewish origins, Emry taught that Esau intermarried with Canaanites, and those descendants "infiltrated true Israel" to become the scribes and Pharisees.

The Lord's Covenant church, which was founded by Emry, distributed a concordance of Biblical laws, ranging from health to property law, in order that divine law would become the law of the land.

Emry was a prolific writer of pamphlets. During the inflation crisis of the late 1970s and early 1980s, he blamed the Federal Reserve for the nation's economic problems. Emry distributed literature at farm meetings, and advertised in American Agriculture News. In 1984, he published Billions for the Bankers, Debts for the People, a thirty-page primer denouncing the "debt-usury banking system".

Emry taught of a "lost" 29th chapter of Acts that describes the Apostle Paul traveling to Britain.

== Influence ==
Emry's teaching had a direct influence on introducing various members of The Order to Christian Identity beliefs, including the Robert and Sharon Merki, and Jean Craig. The Merkis were first introduced to Emry at the annual Freedom Festival held by the Christian Patriots Defense League in Flora, Illinois, in 1978. Jean Craig was reached by Emry's radio and tape ministry through America's Promise. Order founder Robert Mathew's mistress, Zillah Craig learned of Christian Identity from her great-aunt, who was a follower of Emry.

Emry was an influence on Pete Peters, who attributed his conversion to Identity to Emry's radio sermons. Peters first heard Emry in 1976 while attending Bible college. In October, 1984, Emry ordained Peters as a Christian Identity minister. Emry connected Peters to the Christian Patriots Defense League, a survivalist group founded by John Harrell.

Following Emry's death in 1985, his son-in-law, David Barley, took over the ministry and moved it to Sand Point, Idaho. Continuing Emry's legacy, Barley is noted for opposing the appeal to violence of some Christian Identity leaders. Barley experienced difficulty in expanding the ministry when the ADL portrayed his organization with the same appeal to violence as Richard Butler's Aryan Nations.
