= Goard =

Goard is a surname. Notable people with this surname include:

- Tyrone Goard (born 1990), American footballer
- William Pascoe Goard (1863–1937), British-born Methodist minister in Canada
