= Thomas Rosling Howlett =

Thomas Rosling Howlett (1827–1898) was a Baptist pastor and early proponent of British Israelism. He authored Anglo-Israel, the Jewish problem (1892) considered one of the most influential works on the British-Israel teaching.

== See also ==
- Edward Hine
- William H. Poole
