= Ignatz Lichtenstein =

Hungarian Orthodox rabbi (1825-1908)

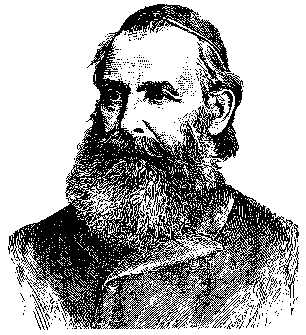
- Ignatz Lichtenstein
- Born: 1825; Hungary
- Died: October 16, 1908
- Other name: Isaac Lichtenstein
- Occupation: Rabbi of Tápiószele Hungary (1857-1892)
- Children: Emanuel Lichtenstein, MD

Ignatz Lichtenstein (April 11, 1825 – October 16, 1908) was a Hungarian Neolog rabbi who wrote "pamphlets advocating conversion to Christianity while still officiating as a Rabbi." Though he refused to be baptized into the Christian faith his whole life, he ultimately retired from his Rabbinical post at the age of 68 in 1892 due to failing health.

== Early life and rabbinic career ==
Lichtenstein was born on April 11, 1825 in Nikolsburg in Austrian Schlesien. He served as a rabbi in the region of Tápiószele, Hungary, and by the mid 1850s he was appointed district rabbi.

In the early 1880s, he began to express his belief that Jesus was the Messiah of Israel. Speaking of his first contact with the gospel, he said: "I looked for thorns and gathered roses." Though he remained officially within Judaism, his writings and teachings on the New Testament led to tension with the local Jewish community and eventually to his departure from the rabbinate.

== Witness within the Jewish community ==
Lichtenstein viewed his continued presence within Jewish life as essential to his mission. He explained that he had not severed ties with his people because doing so would limit his ability to spread the message of Jesus. Comparing himself to the prophets of old, he stated that his participation in synagogue and Jewish communal life gave him unique access to distribute Christian literature, including hundreds of New Testaments.

Despite this, he endured public criticism, including accusations from Jewish press and pulpits of being an agent of English missions. Christian mission societies, meanwhile, were often disappointed that he refused to be baptized. Lichtenstein considered baptism a final rupture with the Jewish community, and instead chose to bear witness while maintaining his identity as a Jew.

== Interaction with Christian missions ==
In 1888 he was visited by the Scottish minister and evangelist Alexander Neil Somerville. Later his biography appeared in the Methodist Episcopal missionary magazine, The Gospel in All Lands, in 1894. Although Lichtenstein declined formal affiliation with mission societies, he traveled to Britain multiple times to meet with supporters, including the missionary David Baron. He also spoke at meetings across the Netherlands, drawing both Christian and Jewish audiences. Despite his popularity abroad, he was increasingly restricted from preaching in Hungary due to opposition from Jewish authorities.

His refusal to be baptized became a consistent point of contention. While some, like the missionary Andrew Moody, urged him to convert formally, Lichtenstein argued that joining a church would distance him from the people he wished to reach. One unique claim by Ragnvald Gjessing suggested that Lichtenstein may have baptized himself in a mikveh, though this lacks further corroboration.

== Personal life ==
On April 26, 1854, Lichtenstein married Hoffer Fáni. Over the course of their marriage, they had six children; however, only two daughters survived into adulthood. Their sons—Wolf (1856–1857) and Emanuel (1859–1887)—as well as two daughters, Julanka (1867–1869) and Aranyka (d. 1874), died before their parents. Two daughters, Kathi (b. 1864) and Ilka (b. 1865, later married Zsigmond Neuberger in 1882), outlived them. Ignatz and Fáni remained married for 55 years until his death in 1908.

== Later years and death ==
In his later years, Lichtenstein’s activity declined due to age and waning health. He visited Britain a final time in 1903 and continued writing and engaging in correspondence with supporters. In 1908, after falling ill during a visit to the spa town of Vihnye, he returned to Budapest, where he died on 16 November 1908.

His funeral was held at the Neolog Synagogue cemetery in Budapest. The obituary in the Algemeine Judische Zeitung denounced him in harsh terms, calling him an apostate and accusing him of using missionary funds. Despite the hostility, he was buried in a Jewish cemetery, as he had never formally left Judaism.

== Legacy ==
The Jewish historian Gotthard Deutsch, an editor of the Jewish Encyclopedia, in an essay published 3 February 1916, mentions him in the course of refuting a claim by the Chief Rabbi of London that no rabbi had ever become a convert to Christianity. Followers of Messianic Judaism mention him as an example of a turn of the 19th century "Jewish believer in Jesus."

Lichtenstein occupies a unique place in the history of Jewish-Christian relations. His decision to remain within the Jewish community while testifying to Jesus set him apart from most contemporary converts. His writings, which sought to bridge evangelical and Jewish thought, remain influential in studies of Messianic Judaism and Hebrew Christianity.

== Bibliography ==
Catalogues of works authored by Lichtenstein, including this one, may make dubious attributions. Deutsch, for example, notes he is often confused with former Rabbi Jehiel Lichtenstein (1831–1912) who worked for a missionary institute in Leipzig.

Original German Works:

- Der Talmud auf der Anklagebank durch einen begeisterten Verehrer des Judenthums [“The Talmud on the Dock by an Inspired Worshipper of Judaism”], Heft I (Budapest, 1886).
- Mein Zeugnis [“My Testimony”], Heft II (Budapest: Hornyánszky, 1886).
- Die Liebe und die Bekehrung [“Love and Conversion”], Heft III (Budapest, 1886).
- Judenthum und Christenthum [“Judaism and Christianity”], (Hamburg: A. Scheibenhuber, 1891?).
- Eine Bitte an die geehrten Leser [“An Appeal to Honored Readers”], (Budapest, 1893 or 1894), also known as Eine Bitte an das israelitische Volk
- “‘Zwei Briefe’ oder ‘was ich eigentlich will’” [“‘Two Letters’ or ‘What I Really Wish’”], Saat auf Hoffnung 30 (1893), 9-36.
- “Das Blut Christi, ein Nachklang aus dem Midrasch Echa” [“The Blood of Christ, an Echo of Midrash Ekhah”], Saat auf Hoffnung 30 (1893), 229-32.
- Judenspiegel [“The Jewish Mirror”] (Vienna: L. Schoenberger, 1896).
- “Welche Anknüpfungspunkte findet die evangelische Verkündigung bei den Juden?” [“Which Connecting Factors do Protestant Doctrines find with Jewish Doctrines?”] in Gustaf Dalman (ed.), Die allgemeine Konferenz für Judenmission in Leipzig, abgehalten vom 6. bis 8. Juni 1895, (Leipzig,1896), 40-55. [Series: Schriften des Institutum Judaicum in Leipzig, No. 44-46]; later reprinted by “The Hebrew Christian Testimony to Israel” in London as Begegnungspunkte zwischen Juden und Christen: Gesetz und Evangelium [“Points of Meeting between Jewish and Christian Doctrine: the Law and the Gospel”.] (London: H.C.T.I., 1902).
- “Ein Weihnachts- und Neujahrsgruß an alle Neugeborenen im Herrn” [“A Christmas and New Year Greeting to all the Born Again in the Lord”], Saat auf Hoffnung 36 (1899), 5-9.
- Ein Geheimniss aus dem Talmud [“A Secret from the Talmud”], (Vienna: L. Scnberger, 1900).
- “Ein Weihnachts- und Neujahrsgruß für die auserwählten Kinder des Lichtes” [“A Christmas and New Year Greeting for the Elect Children of the Light”], Saat auf Hoffnung 37 (1900), 35-40.
- “Ein Neujahrsgruß für die Neugebornen im Herrn zum Heilsjahre 1902” [“A New Year Greeting for the Born Again in the Lord in the Year, 1902”], Saat auf Hoffnung 39 (1902), 5-8.

Translations into English:

- J. Lichtenstein. Judaism and Christianity (translated from the German by Margaret M. Alison) (Edinburgh: Morrison & Gibb, 1893). [Translation of 4.]
- An Appeal to the Jewish People (Translated by Mrs. [?] Baron). [London]: The Hebrew Christian Testimony to Israel (H. C. T. I., 1894). [Translation of 5.]
- "Letter from Rabbi Lichtenstein,” The Jewish Era 4:4 (Oct. 1895), 76.
- Two Letters’ or ‘What I Really Wish, (translated by Mrs. [?] Baron) (London: The Hebrew Christian Testimony to Israel (H. C. T. I., 189?). [Translation of 6.]
- “What Connecting Links Does the Proclamation of the Gospel Find with the Jew?” [translated by Mrs. E. R. Kinglinger] The Jewish Era 5:1 (Jan. 1896), 1-3; 5:2 (April 1896), 37-42. [Translation of 9.]
- The Jewish Mirror (London: H. C. T. I., 1897). [Translation of 8.]
- The Points of Contact between Evangelical and Jewish Doctrine: An Address, Delivered at Leipsic [sic] (Translated from the German by Mrs. [David] Baron) (Northfield, England: H. C. T. I., 1897). [Translation of 9.]
- “A New Year’s Greeting to the Elect Children of Light,” The Jewish Era 7:2 (April 1898), 37-39.
- The Blood of Christ. H. C. T. I. (1903). [Translation of 7.]
- “A New Year’s Greeting from Rabbi Lichtenstein,” The Jewish Era 12:1 (Jan. 15, 1903), 1-3.

Original Hungarian Works:

- Két levél vagy Amit én tulajdonképpen akarok [“Two Letters; or, What I Really Wish”]
- Kérelem a zsidó olvasókhoz [“An Appeal to the Jewish People”]
- Zsidók tükre [“The Jewish Mirror”]

Translations into French:

- Le Miroir Juif [“The Jewish Mirror”]
- Points de Contact, Discours par le Rabbin Lichtenstein [“Points of Meeting between Jewish and Christian Doctrine: the Law and the Gospel”]

Translation into Italian:

- Uno specchio giudaico, o le scritture riguardanti il messia [“The Jewish Mirror”] (Traduzione della traduzione Inglese dell'originale Tedesco. Firenze : Tip. Fattori e Puggelli, 1914.)

Translation into Yiddish:

- מיין בקשה, פון הרב י' יצחק ליכטענשטיין [“An Appeal to the Jewish People”]
