= CBIA =

CBIA may refer to:

- CBQR-FM
- Cobyrinate a,c-diamide synthase, an enzyme
- Canadian British-Israel Association, an organization with British Israelism
