= Canadian British-Israel Association =

The Canadian British-Israel Association
- Formation: September 1, 1956; 69 years ago
- Purpose: Bible Prophecy and Historical Research into The Two Houses of Israel
- Headquarters: Windsor, Ontario
- Location(s): Canada and United States.
- President: Mary Bennett

The Canadian British-Israel Association (CBIA for short) is an organisation with British Israelism. Founded in August 1956, its mother association is the British-Israel-World Federation in the United Kingdom.

Founded by Cubby Gladwin of British Columbia, the Canadian British-Israel Association started in 1956 with their first convention held in the city of Winnipeg. Its website carries books by Howard Rand, known as the first person to coin the term 'Christian Identity'. and the founder of the Anglo-Saxon Federation of America.

== See also ==
- The British-Israel-World Federation
