= Neil Baldwin =

Neil Baldwin may refer to:

- Neil Baldwin (Keele University) (born 1946), honorary graduate of Keele University and former kit-man for Stoke City Football Club in the United Kingdom
- Neil Baldwin (writer), writer and professor in the United States
