= Neil Baldwin (writer) =

American writer and professor

- Born: New York City, New York
- Education: University of Rochester, State University of New York at Buffalo
- Occupations: writer/author, emeritus professor
- Writing career
- Language: English
- Subjects: American history, art, literature, and culture
- Website: www.neilbaldwinbooks.com

Neil Baldwin is a poet, critic, cultural historian, biographer, arts executive, and emeritus professor (as of July 1, 2020) in the College of the Arts at Montclair State University. He is the 2024-2026 External Mentor for the National Park Service Mellon Humanities Postdoctoral Fellowship Program at the Thomas Edison National Historic Park in West Orange, New Jersey; and his work in process is The Solace of Art in Later Life.

== Career ==
He was the editor of The Niagara Magazine between 1974 and 1982, and he worked in fundraising for the New York Public Library between 1984 and 1989.

Baldwin was the executive director of the National Book Foundation and sponsor of the National Book Awards for 15 years, from its founding in 1989 until his resignation in 2003.

He is the author of 11 books, including Henry Ford and the Jews: The Mass Production of Hate, Edison: Inventing the Century, and Man Ray: American Artist, as well as poetry, criticism and history.

== Themes in writings ==
Baldwin describes a common thread in some of his work as follows:

"...my first two subjects were William Carlos Williams, the poet and physician and probably, you could say, the precursor of--of modern poetry in America today. And the second subject was Man Ray, who was the photographer and painter who was also a great American figure. And I viewed Man Ray as a quintessential modernist figure. And what I did was if--William Carlos Williams, I was talking about a genre and the history of a genre. And then I decided the most important thing after that would be to try to define a period as a whole, the modern period as a whole, so Man Ray to me was the metaphor for the modernist period in art."

"And then I thought, 'Well, I've dealt with two highly creative individuals, and I've explored their imaginations.' But I wanted to make the point that creativity and imagination are not the sole province of the artist, the--the humanist thinker. I wanted to show that invention, which was actually defined as an art in Edison's time--it was actually called the art of invention. I wanted to show that the inventive process, the creative process, they all stem from the--the--the deepest core of the imagination in--in a human being, and I wanted to connect all those creative processes in the context of an American vision."

"And if you look at the time frame for these three books--William Carlos Williams, Man Ray, Thomas Edison--they all begin sort of in the last vestiges of the industrial era and the romantic era in culture and they pass through the cataclysm of the wars and they end up sort of on the threshold of--of our day. And so I do think they all connect, even though on first blush it is--it's hard to see the connection, but I think there is a connection."

== Media appearances ==
Baldwin has been featured in various media outlets discussing his work. Notably, he appeared on NPR's "Fresh Air" to discuss his book Henry Ford and the Jews: The Mass Production of Hate, where he detailed Ford's anti-Semitic writings and their impact.

== Bibliography ==
Title	Year	Publisher	Subject matter	Interviews and articles
To All Gentleness: William Carlos Williams, the Doctor Poet	1984	Atheneum Books	William Carlos Williams	
Man Ray: American Artist (Baldwin used this book in writing the screenplay for the PBS American Masters documentary Man Ray: Prophet of the Avant-Garde.)	1988	Clarkson Potter	Man Ray	
Edison: Inventing the Century	1995	Hyperion Books	Thomas Edison	Booknotes interview with Baldwin on Edison, March 19, 1995, C-SPAN
Legends of the Plumed Serpent: Biography of a Mexican God	1998	PublicAffairs	Quetzalcoatl	Presentation by Baldwin on Legends of the Plumed Serpent, December 9, 1998, C-SPAN
Henry Ford and the Jews: The Mass Production of Hate	2001	PublicAffairs	Henry Ford, The International Jew, The Dearborn Independent	
The American Revelation: Ten Ideals That Shaped Our Country From the Puritans to the Cold War	2006	St. Martin's Press	John Winthrop; The Massachusetts Bay Company	After Words interview with Baldwin on The American Revelation, June 13, 2005, C-SPAN
The American Revelation: Ten Ideals That Shaped Our Country From the Puritans to the Cold War	2006	St. Martin's Press	Thomas Paine; Common Sense	After Words interview with Baldwin on The American Revelation, June 13, 2005, C-SPAN
The American Revelation: Ten Ideals That Shaped Our Country From the Puritans to the Cold War	2006	St. Martin's Press	Pierre Eugene du Simitiere; E pluribus unum	After Words interview with Baldwin on The American Revelation, June 13, 2005, C-SPAN
The American Revelation: Ten Ideals That Shaped Our Country From the Puritans to the Cold War	2006	St. Martin's Press	Ralph Waldo Emerson; Self-Reliance	After Words interview with Baldwin on The American Revelation, June 13, 2005, C-SPAN
The American Revelation: Ten Ideals That Shaped Our Country From the Puritans to the Cold War	2006	St. Martin's Press	John L. O'Sullivan; Manifest destiny	After Words interview with Baldwin on The American Revelation, June 13, 2005, C-SPAN
The American Revelation: Ten Ideals That Shaped Our Country From the Puritans to the Cold War	2006	St. Martin's Press	Henry George; Progress and Poverty	After Words interview with Baldwin on The American Revelation, June 13, 2005, C-SPAN
The American Revelation: Ten Ideals That Shaped Our Country From the Puritans to the Cold War	2006	St. Martin's Press	Jane Addams; Hull House	After Words interview with Baldwin on The American Revelation, June 13, 2005, C-SPAN
The American Revelation: Ten Ideals That Shaped Our Country From the Puritans to the Cold War	2006	St. Martin's Press	Israel Zangwill; The Melting Pot	After Words interview with Baldwin on The American Revelation, June 13, 2005, C-SPAN
The American Revelation: Ten Ideals That Shaped Our Country From the Puritans to the Cold War	2006	St. Martin's Press	Carter G. Woodson; Association for the Study of African American Life and History	After Words interview with Baldwin on The American Revelation, June 13, 2005, C-SPAN
The American Revelation: Ten Ideals That Shaped Our Country From the Puritans to the Cold War	2006	St. Martin's Press	George Marshall; The Marshall Plan	After Words interview with Baldwin on The American Revelation, June 13, 2005, C-SPAN
Martha Graham: When Dance Became Modern	2022	Knopf	Martha Graham	
