= Howard Rand =

Howard Rand, also known as Howard B. Rand and Howard Benjamin Rand (June 13, 1889 – October 17, 1991) was a lawyer, inventor, and three-time candidate for Massachusetts state office on the Prohibition Party ticket, He headed the former Anglo-Saxon Federation of America, a British Israelite group. He served from 1937 to 1968 as editor of its affiliate Destiny Publishers, which put out Destiny magazine (distinct from the magazine of the same name about Black culture).

== Early life and career ==
Rand was born in Haverhill, Massachusetts in 1889. He was raised as a British Israelite, and his father introduced him to J. H. Allen's work Judah's Sceptre and Joseph's Birthright (1902) at an early age. He later graduated from the University of Maine with a bachelor's degree in law, becoming a successful lawyer but also worked as a construction worker and had other business interests.

Rand was also a prolific author of books on British Israelism, Bible studies, and pyramidology (most published by Destiny Publishers). Rand published The Bulletin, later renamed The Messenger of the Covenant. More recently it has been renamed Destiny and issued by Destiny Publishers.

== Anglo-Saxon Federation of America ==
In 1928, Rand began organizing for the London-based British-Israel World Federation. He eventually established his own British Israel organization, the Anglo-Saxon Federation of America, in Detroit in 1930. Prior to its foundation, Rand had met with prominent British Israelites such as William Pascoe Goard for advice and meetings. He later acquired C. A. L. Totten's book archive through the Totten Memorial Trust.

== Influence on Christian Identity ==
Rand is considered the key transitional figure between British Israelism and Christian Identity, but he is not credited as the actual founder of the Christian Identity movement. The Anti-Defamation League also lists Rand as a prominent influential figure behind Christian Identity. He first coined the term "Identity". Professor Nicholas Goodrick-Clarke has summed up Rand as the catalyst figure behind Christian Identity as "a vital link between British-Israelism and its later American variant, Christian Identity, for he not only consolidated the movement in the United States but also opened it to the right-wing and anti-Semitic influences".

While standard British Israelite teaching was that the Jews are descended from the tribe of Judah, Rand claimed that they were instead the descendants of Esau or Canaanites. Eventually, in Christian Identity this would shift even farther to become the belief modern Jews were descendants of Satan.

Paradoxically, while early British Israelites such as Edward Hine and John Wilson were philo-semites, Christian Identity emerged in sharp contrast to be strongly antisemitic.

Rand did not teach any violence or hatred towards other races, but these acts would later emerge as the focus of the Christian Identity movement. In fact, Rand was a pacifist and his ideas have been described as a "peaceful missionary imperative."

== Works ==
=== Books ===
- Behold He Cometh
- Words of Wisdom
- Study in Revelation (1941)
- Digest of the Divine Law (1943)
- Study in Jeremiah (1947)
- Primogenesis (1948)
- Documentary Studies, Volumes I (1947)
- Documentary Studies, Volumes II (1947)
- Documentary Studies, Volumes III (1947)
- Joel's Prophetic Message and Warning (1956)
- Marvels of Prophecy (1959)
- Study in Daniel (1962)
- Study in Hosea (1963)
- The Hour Cometh! (1966)
- Gems of Truth (1968)
- Study in Isaiah (1996, published posthumously)

== See also ==
- Reuben H. Sawyer
