= Ernest G. Liebold =

American businessman (1884–1956)

Ernest G. Liebold (March 16, 1884 – March 4, 1956) was the business representative and personal secretary of Henry Ford. A fervent antisemite, he took an active part in the antisemitic campaign conducted by the industrialist's weekly newspaper, The Dearborn Independent, from 1920 to 1927. He was also put under investigation by the United States Department of War for being a suspected German spy during the First World War.

== Biography ==
Ernest Gustav Liebold was born in Detroit, Michigan, on March 16, 1884; his parents were German Lutheran immigrants. He grew up in Detroit's German community, at a time when it was "the primary source of the city's anti-Semitism". Liebold attended Detroit's Eastern High School and graduated from Gutchess Metropolitan Business College, and subsequently worked at a number of temporary positions as a stenographer and bookkeeper before being employed by the Peninsula Savings Bank in Highland Park, Michigan. There Liebold rapidly established himself, progressing from messenger to bank officer. His strong financial acumen drew the interest of James Couzens, vice president and general manager of the Ford Motor Company, who asked him to organize the newly established Highland Park State Bank; Liebold started working there as the cashier in 1909, and was later made president of the bank. He married Clara Alicia Reich on March 17, 1910.

In 1910, after resigning from the Highland Park State Bank, Liebold was hired by Henry Ford as his personal secretary. Ford "placed great trust in the judgement of Ernest Liebold" and considered him "the best financial mind in the country". On July 13, 1918, the industrialist gave Liebold power-of-attorney for himself and his wife, Clara, hence vesting him with the authority "to handle all of his personal financial transactions, correspondence, and contracts". Liebold's office was in the Ford Motor Company, but he was paid directly by Henry Ford. His importance gradually increased over the ensuing years, and Liebold eventually came to manage "nearly all of Ford's business outside Ford Motor Company".

Liebold's authority began to fade around 1933, (Note: Scott Nehmer traces the origins of Liebold's downfall as far back as 1928.) when other figures, including Harry Bennett and Frank Campsall, gained prominence in the eyes of Henry Ford: Bennett became Ford's adviser, and Campsall replaced Liebold as his personal secretary. Deprived of much of his power, Liebold continued working for Ford for eleven more years, before finally retiring in 1944.

In January 1953 he was interviewed by Owen W. Bombard about his life and career; the interview, part of the Ford Motor Company oral history program, was transcribed and gathered in ten volumes. Liebold died in Grosse Pointe Woods, Michigan on March 4, 1956, at the age of seventy-one.

== Antisemitism ==
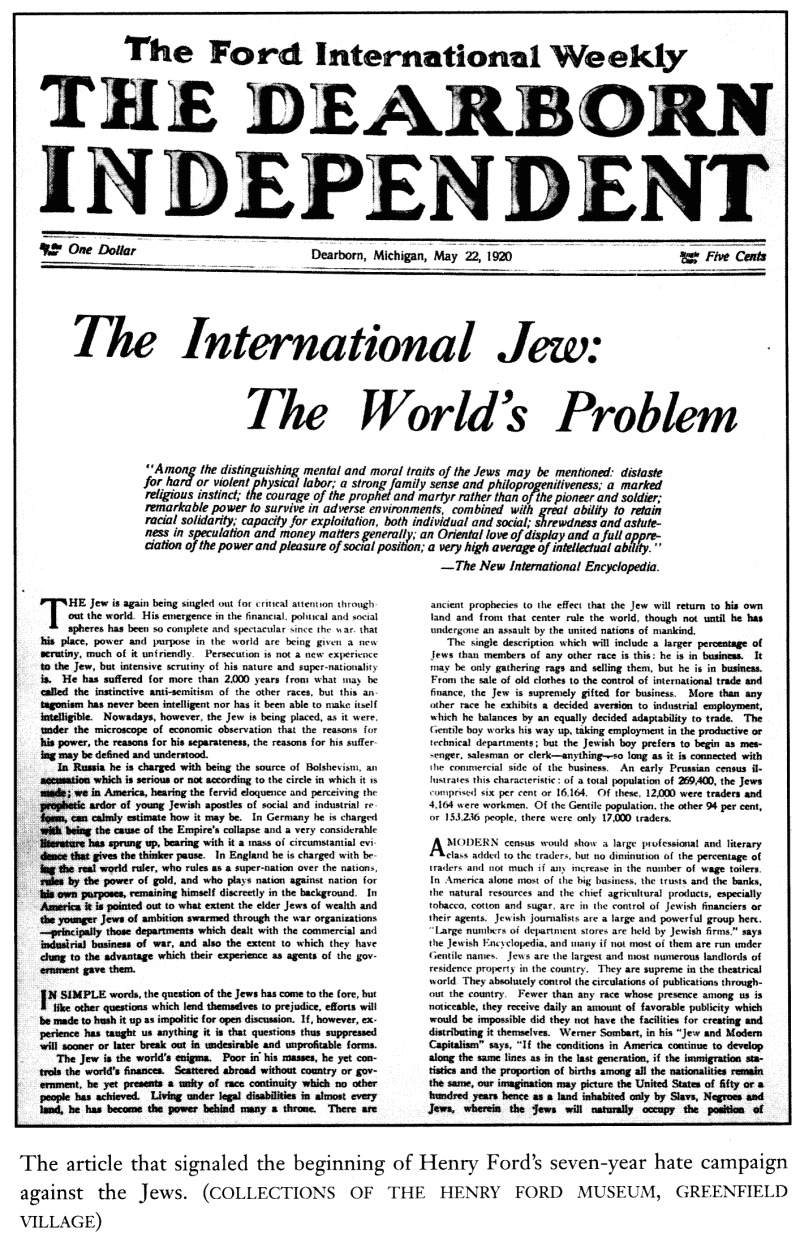
First page of the May 22, 1920 issue of The Dearborn Independent

In 1918 Liebold purchased on Ford's behalf The Dearborn Independent, a small-town newspaper owned by Marcus Woodruff; Ford's intent was to publish a weekly magazine in which to express his own views on politics, economy, and society. Edwin G. Pipp, former editor for The Detroit News and a friend of Ford, became the newspaper's editor, and Fred L. Black was appointed business manager; Liebold was nominated general manager and, together with journalist William J. Cameron, curated "Mr. Ford's Own Page," a weekly feature devoted to Ford's thoughts. On March 31, 1920, Pipp resigned as editor, in protest over the increasingly antisemitic editorial line of the newspaper: starting in the early months of 1919, the Independent had indeed begun publishing articles condemning the 'noxious influence of the Jews,' mostly on Liebold's initiative.

According to several Independent employees, including Pipp and Black, Liebold manipulated Henry Ford and fomented his hatred of the Jews: Pipp stated that "the door to Ford's mind was always open to anything Liebold wanted to shove in it, and during that time Mr. Ford developed a dislike for the Jews, a dislike which appeared to become stronger and more bitter as time went on... In one way and another, the feeling oozed into his system until it became a part of his living self." Fred Black asserted: "If I were to put the number one blame [for Ford's antisemitism] on anyone, I would put it on Liebold."

The Independent contributed to the diffusion of The Protocols of the Elders of Zion, a Russian forgery describing a fictional Jewish plan for world domination. The text was purportedly brought to the United States by a Russian army officer in 1917, and translated into English by Natalie de Bogory (personal assistant of Harris A. Houghton, an officer of the Department of War) in June 1918; Boris Brasol, a Russian expatriate, soon circulated it in American government circles, specifically diplomatic and military, in typescript form. Liebold later came into contact with Brasol, (Note: It is complicated to determine when they first met, since the relevant documentation held in the Ford Archives was destroyed in the 1960s, along with the Ford Rotunda.) who gave him a copy of the English translation of the Protocols; Liebold immediately handed it to William Cameron, appointed editor of the Independent after Pipp's resignation, and the forgery was published in serial form starting with the June 26, 1920 issue. The most popular and aggressive stories were then chosen to be reprinted into four volumes called The International Jew. The first volume was published in November 1920 as an anthology of articles that had been published in the Independent from May 22 to October 2, 1920. Three additional volumes were published over the next months.

Liebold also held Nazi sympathies; in September 1938, just two months after Ford received the Grand Cross of the German Eagle, he was awarded the Order of the German Eagle, First Class, the second highest diplomatic honor of the Third Reich.

== Espionage ==
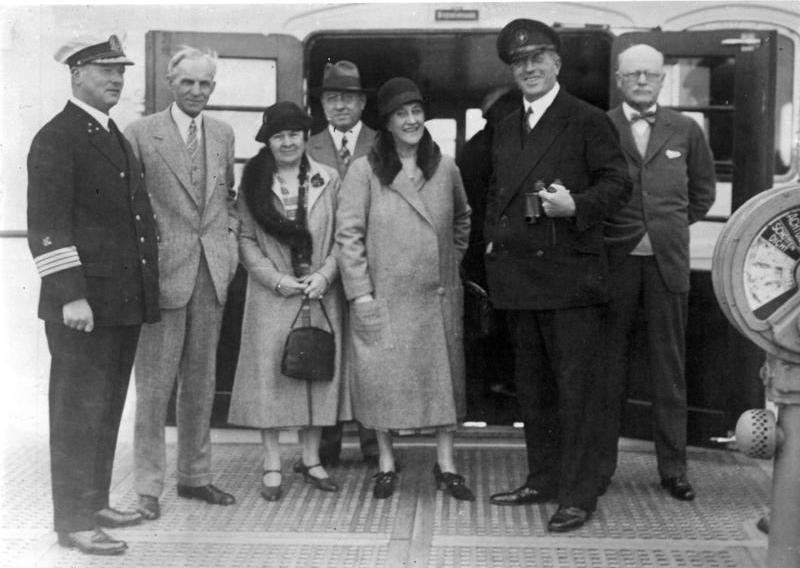
Ernest Liebold (fourth from left) in a group photo taken in Germany in September 1930 (in the original caption, he is erroneously referred to as "Mr. Giehsed")

Declassified documents from the U.S. National Archives, cited by Max Wallace in his book The American Axis, show that Liebold was investigated by the United States Department of War's Military Intelligence Division in 1918 for being a suspected German spy, following an informant's tip. In a December 10, 1917 letter, the informant reported that Liebold had been recently caught in his office showing the blueprints of the Liberty L-12 (an aircraft engine manufactured by the Ford Motor Company for the U.S. Army) to a reporter for the New Yorker Staats-Zeitung; in the same letter, the informant writes that it was Liebold himself who coordinated Henry Ford's 1915 pacifist campaign, which culminated in the ruinous Peace Ship expedition. (Note: According to Max Wallace: "Ford's pacifist campaign of 1915 had been launched just as the fortunes of the German army were beginning to sour in Europe... A negotiated peace, or continued American neutrality, would have benefited the Kaiser and spared Germany the catastrophic defeat it would later suffer. It is entirely conceivable that Liebold engineered and manipulated Ford's pacifist efforts and hatred of the Jews to benefit the German war effort.") The probe, suspended in October 1918, eventually turned up nothing. A later investigation carried out by John Bugas showed that Liebold "had close ties" to one of the members of the Duquesne Spy Ring, the network of Nazi spies dismantled in 1941; however, Bugas "ultimately found Liebold to be harmless".

Liebold's alleged espionage activity has been the subject of debate among scholars: Wallace, for instance, endorses the hypothesis that he was actually a spy, while other historians, including Scott Nehmer and Victoria Saker Woeste, are not so quick to reach any such conclusion. (Note: Victoria Saker Woeste writes: "Wallace's archival work in the Ford files and the Lindbergh Papers at Yale represents a real accomplishment. Unfortunately, his handling of historical materials generally, and primary sources in particular, undermines the credibility of his arguments. Wallace does a poor job of exposition when he has important finds to describe, as in the case of the War Department's files on Ernest G. Liebold, the Ford secretary who was a suspected German spy. Wallace leaps to the conclusion that Liebold was a spy, even while acknowledging that the government file contains no such finding.")
