= Anglo-Saxon Federation of America =

British Israelite group (founded 1930)

- Formation: 1930; 96 years ago
- Location: United States, Canada

The Anglo-Saxon Federation of America is a British Israelite group founded by Howard Rand in 1930.

== History ==
=== Beginnings ===
In 1928, Howard B. Rand, a lawyer and Bible student, began organizing for the British-Israel World Federation and started conducting a small Anglo-Saxon group in his house, and began publishing a British-Israelite magazine called Kingdom Message. In early 1930, Rand met William J. Cameron in Detroit, Michigan, to establish a branch of the Anglo-Saxon Federation of America. Cameron became the new organization's president and Suite 601 of the Fox Building in Detroit became their first headquarters. Detroit hosted the first convention in May 1930.

=== Growth ===
Soon after the initial convention in Detroit, growth of the Federation occurred rapidly. There was a state convention in California in September 1930, and an Oregon branch was formed in 1931. The group's second convention was held in Chicago in 1931. It was at this convention that Rand announced the federation had acquired the unsold works of C. A. L. Totten along with their printing plates. Following the second convention, new branches of the Anglo-Saxon Federation of America were established in Chicago, St. Petersburg, Florida, and Miami. By that time, the Pacific Coast District included California, Oregon, Washington, Idaho, Nevada, and Utah.

Rand was primarily an organizer, while Cameron, having been editor of Henry Ford's The Dearborn Independent, brought with him the clout and connection to powerful business and political leaders. According to Michael Barkun, the two men working together "facilitated the first systematic attempt to link British-Israel religious ideas with the political right." In September 1931, Cameron encouraged Rand to publish a special issue of the federation's newsletter to send to "the leading men of this country." The two met with Rand's acquaintance Fred R. Marvin, a political operator who provided them a mailing list for the American Coalition of Patriotic Societies. Rand wrote and published the special issue, which Cameron financed, to be distributed by their list. "The special issue came out in a printing of thirty thousand the following February, so that Rand’s British-Israel message could blanket the American right in the darkest days of the Depression."

=== Peak and Decline ===
By the 1930s and 1940s, several groups affiliated with the federation could be found throughout the United States. After a split between Rand and Cameron, in 1938 the group's headquarters were moved from Detroit to Haverhill, MA, where Rand lived.

The organization's framework decayed rapidly following World War II. The only branch to survive into the 1960s was in Portland, Oregon and it stopped publishing a newsletter in mid-1964.

By the mid-1970s, most of the group's membership had either died or left the group. Its magazine, Destiny Magazine, ceased monthly publication in 1969, publishing quarterly until 1970 after which Rand continued publishing an "Editorial Letter."

The group still remains active, publishing books and accepting new members. They are now located at 43 Grove Street in Merrimac Massachusetts.

== Beliefs ==
The group asserts that the Bible contains the past, present, and future history of Israel.

The group also believes that the Bible determines exactly which group should take the name "Israel" based on which nation or race best fulfills the promises God made in the Old Testament. The Bible states that Israel was to be a powerful nation located to the northwest of Palestine that holds a great heathen empire in domination, is the chief missionary power in the world, and is immune to defeat in war. The Bible also mentions a group which split itself off from the parent "Israel" to become a great nation in its own right. The federation concludes that the only nation which meets the above criteria was Great Britain, and, by extension, the United States which separated itself from Great Britain later.

== Influence on Christian Identity ==
Howard Rand is considered the first person to coin the term 'Christian Identity', and is considered a 'transitional' figure from British Israelism to Christian Identity. He was raised as a British Israelite, and his father introduced him to J. H. Allen's work Judah's Sceptre and Joseph's Birthright (1902) at an early age. While Rand was not an anti-Semite in his early British Israelite years, he began to add an antisemitic element to British Israelism in the 1920s. He claimed as early as 1924 that the Jews were not really descended from the tribe of Judah, but were instead the descendants of Esau or Canaanites. However, Rand never claimed that modern Jews were descendants of Satan, or that they were inferior; just that they were not the true lineal descendants of Judah.

The Anglo-Saxon Federation of America promoted Rand's view that Jews were not descended from Judah; this marked the first key transition from British Israelism to Christian Identity. Beginning in May 1937, there were key meetings of British Israelites in the United States who were attracted to Rand's theory that the Jews were not descended from Judah. This provided a catalyst for the eventual emergence of Christian Identity.

== See also ==
- Destiny Publishers
- British-Israel World Federation
