= William Pascoe Goard =

William Pascoe Goard.

William Pascoe Goard F.R.G.S (17 January 1863 - 9 February 1937) was a Methodist minister and prominent British Israelite of the first half of the 20th century.

== Life ==
William Pascoe Goard was born in Cornwall, England. After studying law in London, he moved to Bowmanville, Ontario in 1880.

Goard was a member of The Salvation Army, where he rose to the rank of captain in charge of the corps at St. Catharines, Ontario. In 1883, he married Amanda Content Honey, who was also an officer in The Salvation Army. He moved to Winnipeg and was ordained as a Methodist minister in 1886.

In 1906, Goard moved to Vancouver to serve as minister of Zion church, and in 1912 became minister of the Knox Congregational Church (later renamed Grandview Congregational Church).

Goard organized the British Israel Association of Vancouver in 1909 along with Edward Odlum, and in 1913 he traveled to London to participate in negotiations uniting various British Israel groups into the British-Israel-World Federation. He became vice president of the BIWF in 1921. He was the first editor of The National Message published by the BIWF when it was founded in 1922, also founded Covenant Publishing, the publishing arm of the BIWF. Later he became the President of the World Council of the BIWF.

Goard was a prolific author, writing more than 20 books on British Israelism, as well as publishing articles and editorials for The National Message. In 1930, he attended a special ceremony at the Chicago–Kent College of Law where he was awarded the degree of "Doctor of Legislative Law" in recognition of excellent scholarship for his book The Law of the Lord: The Common Law (1928).

On 17 September 1936 Goard was welcomed by the BIWF at Spencer Street Station, Melbourne, Australia. He made a tour of both New Zealand and Australia in autumn 1936 before his death at Harrow Weald College, England, on 9 February 1937, at the age of 74.

== Works ==
The Two-fold British Race in Britain and Palestine (1921)
Isaiah: a study (1925)
Our Heritage: the Bible (1926)
The Bible and Science (1926)
The Epistle to the Romans (1927)
The Law of the Lord: The Common Law (1928)
The kingdom of God (1928)
Crossing the river (1930)
The Documents of Daniel (1930)
The Empire In Solution With Chapters On Anglo-Saxon Civilization (1931)
The simple truth (1932)
The second coming of our Lord (1932)
Bethesda-or-Jesus Christ (1933)
The Post-Captivity Names of Israel (1934)
What is British-Israel truth? (1936)

== See also ==
- Edward Hine
- C. A. L. Totten
- John Wilson
