= William H. Poole (writer) =

Irish minister known for British Israelism

William Henry Poole (1820 – August 7, 1896) was an Irish-born Canadian Methodist minister and proponent of British Israelism. He is known for his 1889 book Anglo-Israel: or, The British Nation Proved to be the Lost Tribes of Israel, later published with "British Nation" changed to "Saxon Race".

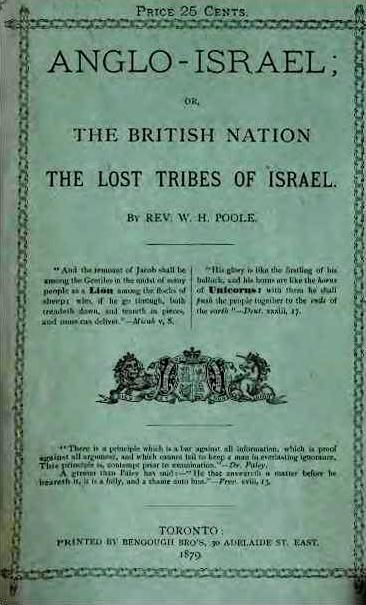
The 1879 edition of Anglo-Israel

== Biography ==
Poole was born in Ireland and moved to Canada. His book was originally presented as the first in a series of nine lectures and later published in Toronto, Ontario, Canada beginning in 1879 under the title Anglo-Israel; or, The British Nation the Lost Tribes of Israel. It was republished in New York City during 1880 with the new title replacing "British nation" with "Saxon Race".

The book drew on earlier arguments published by Edward Hine, adding new arguments on linguistic grounds that the original Anglo-Saxons were among the lost tribes of Israel. The work was widely circulated.

In reaction to his speculations, which also suggested that the Irish Catholics were the remnants of the Canaanites, Dr Poole was expelled from the Methodist Church in Canada. He relocated to Detroit, Michigan where he became a Methodist Episcopalian.

He died from apoplexy on August 7, 1896. He was buried in Albury Cemetery in Prince Edward County, Ontario, Canada.
