= Aaron Sapiro =

American lawyer

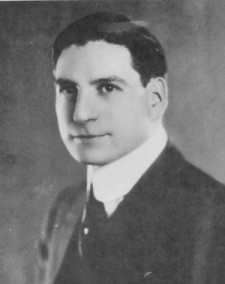

Aaron Leland Sapiro (February 5, 1884 – November 23, 1959) was a Jewish American cooperative activist and lawyer for the farmers' movement during the 1920s. He became notable for suing Henry Ford, the automobile magnate, for libel as a result of an article published about his activities in The Dearborn Independent newspaper, in 1927. One of the many issues he spoke on was cooperative grain marketing and was particularly active in California and Saskatoon in Saskatchewan where he addressed several meetings between 1923 and 1924. However, he was also associated with organized crime, particularly with Al Capone and groups such as the Chicago’s Laundry Owners’ Association, a front-group for the Mob, by whom he was retained for $25,000 a year (1930 dollars). In the early 1930s, he was repeatedly arrested, accused of organizing a laundry racket conspiracy which linked him with Capone. He was indicted by a grand jury in 1933 for racketeering. In 1934 another trial resulted in a mistrial and he and Capone had the charges against them dropped, but as a result of the trial he had his license to practice law in New York State revoked, while the negative publicity it generated forced him to retreat from public life and into obscurity.

== Biography ==
Sapiro was born in Oakland, California. The son of Jewish immigrants, his childhood was lived in relative poverty. Despite this, he was able to obtain a law degree and gain a position on the California markets board staff, where he became acquainted with the concepts of agricultural cooperation for the first time. He was active in organizing in the United States before being posted by the Farmers’ Union leadership to promote the Pool in western Canada most notably Saskatchewan. He also devised a plan for the "commodity method" of cooperative marketing, which became widely known as the "California Plan" or "Sapiro Plan". According to The New York Times, Sapiro was "the leader of one of the greatest agricultural movements of modern times."

Sapiro spent much of his time organizing cooperatives in California. He publicized the need for a uniform Cooperative Marketing Act and received widespread recognition for enabling many of the states of America to adopt the Act, as well as the endorsement of the National Council of Farmer's Cooperative Marketing Association.

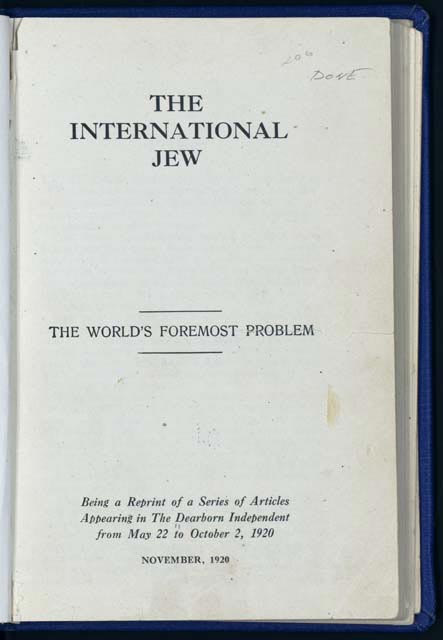
The International Jew, ..........The World's Foremost Problem ..(Volume 1) - November, 1920

In the 1920s, the National Cheese Producers Federation attempted to implement Sapiro's economic theory as its strategy for cornering the cheese market. However, the effort backfired, cheese spoiled in storage, and the director of the Federation committed suicide in his office.

While not on his promotional travels, he worked extensively as a lawyer in both Chicago and San Francisco where, in April 1924, he became outraged with remarks made by Henry Ford in his book and newspaper series The International Jew. News reports at the time quoted Sapiro as being shocked by the content, in particular the section "Jewish Exploitation of the American Farmer's Organizations: Monopoly Traps Operate Under the Guise of Marketing Associations", which attacked the band of Jewish bankers, lawyers, advertising agencies, fruit farmers, market buyers, and office professionals which, according to Ford, contributed to the domination of Jewish people in the American cooperative marketing system. Many prominent Jewish professionals were cited, including Bernard Baruch, Albert Lasker, Eugene Meyer, Otto Kahn and Julius Rosenwald, but the chapter was primarily directed at the influence of Sapiro.

Newspaper caricature of the court case

Sapiro brought a lawsuit against Ford in the federal courts and put the substance of his allegations on national display. As the trial unfolded and combatants of the perceived antisemitism in California participated in court proceedings, Ford secretly commissioned the constitutional lawyer and Jewish activist Louis Marshall to write his apology for his remarks. In doing so, Marshall ended the public controversy and foreclosed further legal action in the case in December 1927. The result of the case is seen historically as an act of repentance and a monumental event in Jewish history in the United States.

Sapiro spent much of his later life in California and died in his Los Angeles apartment at the age of 75.
