= The Eternal Jew (book) =

Antisemitic book from Nazi Germany

- Author: Franz Eher Nachfolger
- Publication date: 1937

The Eternal Jew (German: Der Ewige Jude) is the title of an antisemitic book published in 1937 by Franz Eher Nachfolger, the publishing house of the German Nazi Party (NSDAP). It comprises 267 photographs, each with a short caption denigrating Jewish people.

== See also ==
- The International Jew
- Timeline of antisemitism in the 20th century
- Antisemitism in Europe
