= Edward Hine =

Proponent of British Israelism (1825–1891)

Edward Hine (10 February 1825 – 15 October 1891) was an influential proponent of British Israelism in the 1870s and 1880s, having been influenced by the work of John Wilson (1840). Hine went so far as to conclude, "It is an utter impossibility for England ever to be defeated; and this is another result arising entirely from the fact of our being Israel."

== Career ==
A bank clerk by occupation, Hine claimed that he had been inspired by a lecture given by Wilson, which he heard at the age of 15, but he himself did not publish on the topic for nearly thirty years, giving his first public lecture in 1869.

In 1871, Hine published Identification of the British Nation with Lost Israel.

For several years Hine published a weekly journal, The Nation's Leader, and a monthly magazine, Life from the Dead (from 1873 onwards). In 1880, Hine founded his own British Israel organization, "The British-Israel Identity Corporation."

David Baron in his The History of the Ten "Lost" Tribes cites claims identifying Hine himself with the "Deliverer" announced in Romans 11:25:

Are the British people identical with the lost Ten Tribes of Israel? And is the nation, by the identity, being led to glory? If these things are so, then where is the Deliverer? He must have already come out of Zion. He must be doing His great work; He must be amongst us. It is our impression that, by the glory of the work of the identity, we have come to the time of Israel's national salvation by the Deliverer out of Zion, and that Edward Hine and that Deliverer are identical.

Unlike Wilson, who identified all Teutonic peoples as descendants of the Israelites, Hine reserved this status for the Anglo-Saxons alone, identifying the Germanic peoples as Assyria.

Hine in turn inspired Edward Wheeler Bird, who eventually came to see Hine as a rival rather than an ally. As the institutions created by Bird began to obscure Hine's success in Britain, Hine turned to the United States in search of a new audience.

== Influence ==
Hine's ideas thus influenced the nascent Anglo-Israelite movement in the United States, where they are still advocated by some Christian white supremacist fringe groups, which turned to antisemitism. For example, Clifton A. Emahiser's "Church of True Israel" identifying the Anglo-Saxons as the true Israelites and the modern Jews as Canaanites who must be exterminated according to Jewish law:

Maybe Great Britain is unaware that the Canaanites are the "Jews", as we have the same problem in the United States today. Yahweh commissioned Israel to completely exterminate every Canaanite on the face of the earth, thus we better know for sure who they are.

Likewise, followers of the Christian Identity movement claim that they are descendants of the Biblical Israelites, whereas the Jews are the children of Satan. This development is an inversion of the motivation of Hine, who was in fact a philo-Semite. The Worldwide Church of God of Herbert W. Armstrong also perpetuated Hine's identification of Germany with Assyria, adding the comparison of the Nazi Holocaust with the destruction of Israel by Sargon II, into the 1980s.

== Works ==
- Seventeen Identifications
- The English Nation Identified with the Lost House of Israel by Twenty-seven Identifications (1871)
- Forty-seven Identifications of the British Nation with the Lost Ten Tribes of Israel: Founded upon Five Hundred Scripture Proofs (1874)
- Forty-seven Identifications of the Anglo-Saxons with the Lost Ten Tribes of Israel, Founded upon Five Hundred Scripture Proofs (1878)
- The British Nation Identified with Lost Israel (with a memoir by Isaac Loveland) ([c. 1895–1900])
- England's Coming Glories (1880); 2003 reprint, ISBN 978-0-7661-2885-9.
- Life From the Dead: Being a National Journal Associated with Identity of the British Being Lost Israel (1870s), with John Cox Gawler

== See also ==
- Thomas Rosling Howlett
- William H. Poole (writer)

== Bibliography ==
- Barkun, Michael (1997). Religion and the Racist Right: the Origins of the Christian Identity Movement. University of North Carolina Press. ISBN 0-8078-2328-7.
- Baron, David (2020) [1915]. The History of the Ten Lost Tribes: Anglo-Israelism Examined. Library of Alexandria. ISBN 9781465518644.
- Benite, Zvi Ben-Dor (2013). The Ten Lost Tribes, A World History. Oxford University Press. ISBN 978-0-19-530733-7.
- Cottrell-Boyce, Aidan (2021). Israelism in Modern Britain. Routledge. ISBN 978-1-000-17236-2.
- Darms, Anton (1938). The Delusion of British-Israelism: A Comprehensive Treatise. New York: The Bible Truth Press.
- Emahiser, Clifton A. "Identity Of The Ten Lost Tribes Of Israel With The Anglo-Celto-Saxons, reprint with commentaries" (PDF).
- Fine, Jonathan (2015). Political Violence in Judaism, Christianity, and Islam: From Holy War to Modern Terror. Rowman & Littlefield. ISBN 978-1-4422-4756-7.
- Hine, Edward. Seventeen Identifications – via Internet Archive.
- Ould-Mey, Mohameden (2003). Nairn, Tom; Kalantzis, Mary (eds.). "The Non-Jewish Origin of Zionism" (PDF). International Journal of the Humanities. 1.
