= David Baron (Messianic leader) =

Hebrew-Christian and Christian missionary to Jews

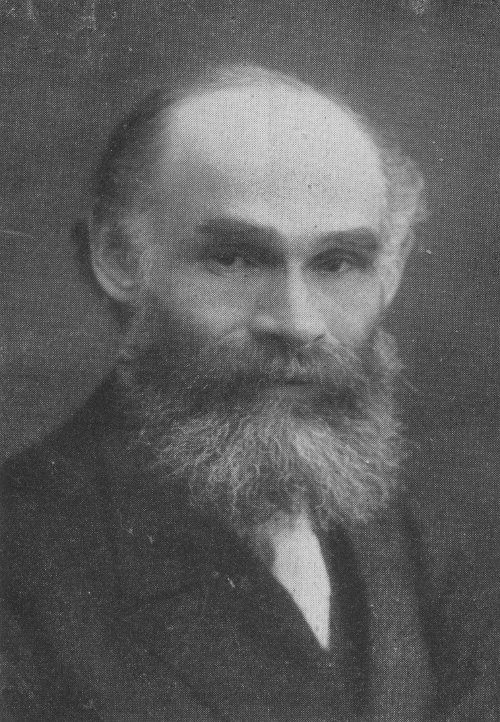
- Born: 1855; Suvalki
- Died: 28 October 1926 (aged 70–71); London
- Occupations: Co-founder of Hebrew Christian Testimony to Israel, author, and public speaker.
- Spouse: Fanny Baron (née Kingsford)
- Parent(s): Mordecai and Sacah Baron

David Baron (1855–1926) was a Jewish convert to Protestantism and co-founder of the Hebrew Christian Testimony to Israel (HCTI) missionary organisation.

== Early life ==
David Baron was born to Jewish parents in the town of Suwałki, then part of the semi-autonomous Kingdom of Poland in the Russian Empire. The youngest of seven children, his childhood was one of traditional Jewish education in a Cheder, where he learned Hebrew. In later life Baron would claim that after an illness which nearly claimed his life, he began to experience spiritual distress which eventually culminated in a religious experience whereby "at last God revealed himself to me" and he became convinced of the need for blood atonement. Raised as an Orthodox Jew, at the age of 10 Baron enrolled in a Yeshiva where he excelled in his studies and won a volume of a commentary on the Talmud. In his teens he intended to emigrate to America with a brother-in-law but a theft compelled him to give his brother his share of money to continue the journey while he remained in Hull England, where he first encountered Christianity.

== Conversion and early missionary work ==
Through a mutual acquaintance, Baron was introduced to Rev John Wilkinson of the Mildmay Mission to the Jews, who invited him to a Bible study session in April 1877, at which he received a copy of the New Testament. Intending to confute the missionary and disprove his doctrines, Baron engaged in six months of private study. He subsequently moved to London where he became familiar with Rev Wilkinson, converted to Christianity in September 1878 and was baptised by Wilkinson on 3 November.

In late 1879 Wilkinson sent Baron to Harley College House for theological training, and having completed a course there in July 1881, he joined the staff of the Mildmay Mission. He was sent to evangelise Jews in Edinburgh, Glasgow and Dundee. In the autumn, Baron settled for two years in Glasgow to evangelise the approximately 500 Jewish families in the city, before relocating back to London. Over the next 12 years Baron conducted missionary work among the Jews there and abroad in association with the Mildmay Mission. Locations included Leicester, Birmingham, and various towns and cities in Germany, Prussia, Poland and Russia in 1885, followed by Austria and Hungary in 1887. During this time Baron began to publish journal articles in Service for the King and Quarterly Record.

3D scan of a Shofar that belonged to Baron, purchased during one of his trips to Palestine

.

In 1891, Baron travelled with his wife and one other missionary on his first trip to Palestine. He would go on to make a further six visits before 1912.

== Founding of the H.C.T.I. ==
While working on the European Continent in 1887, Baron befriended Charles Andrew Schönberger (1841-1924) of the Free Church of Scotland. In 1893 they severed ties with their respective Missions organisations and founded the Hebrew Christian Testimony to Israel that October with the purpose of converting Jews to Hebrew Christianity. The organisation was unique for its exclusive employment of Jewish Christians, with the intention of providing testimony "of Jews to Jews."

For seven years the two men conducted evangelism in England, chiefly London and Glasgow, with funding entirely from donations. In 1891 they purchased for £9000 the first permanent Mission House, 189 Whitechapel Road in London, which remained in use by the organisation until around 1980. In a matter of years the HCTI published about 38 Christian texts in Hebrew, Yiddish, German, English, Russian, Hungarian, French and Italian, with particular missionary emphasis among women and children.

In addition to writing several books, Baron also contributed articles to the periodical The Scattered Nation during this time. He was involved in the Hebrew Christian movements of the Haskalah (Jewish Enlightenment) period in Europe.

== Missionary journeys and final years ==
Baron and the HCTI conducted many mission tours across Continental Europe, the Near East, Canada and the United States. In the aftermath of World War I significant evangelism was conducted in Russia and Eastern Europe, where polemics were exchanged with prominent community rabbis. Baron's chief strategy was to present Jesus as the fulfilment of Messianic prophecy Focus was placed upon areas with particularly large concentrations of Jewish people, like Russia, Hungary, Transylvania and Germany.

In 1923, Baron expressed his desire to expand the HCTI's presence in Palestine. Some missions activity in Eastern Europe was transferred to Palestine, and cooperation was sought with other Christian organisations working there to take advantage of the influx of Jewish immigrants in the wake of the Balfour Declaration.

David Baron died on 28 October 1926, aged 71.

== Views ==
Baron's theological and political views were closely linked. E Bendor Samuel, director of the HCTI, claimed that Baron "set himself the double task of explaining Christian truth to the Jews and Scriptural truth regarding Israel to Christians."

=== Religious views and influences ===
Baron was unaffiliated with any Christian denomination, believing such divisions to be harmful to the Christian witness to Jews. Much of his theological formation was influenced by Free Church of Scotland ministers like Andrew Bonar, whose biography of Robert Murray M'Cheyne he referred to as "one of the first Christian books that I read." From Bonar, who was associated with famous American preacher Dwight L. Moody, Baron adopted a revivalist perspective and dispensational premillennial eschatology. These frameworks were closely associated with the emergence of modern Christian Zionism, of which Bonar and M'Cheyne were among the foremost British proponents. Baron travelled to the United States in 1890 to visit Moody in person. A key part of Baron's theology that shaped his methodology was his belief that the law as interpreted by Rabbis was stifling people under what he called "Jewish popery", and that an understanding of Jesus as fulfillment of the sacrificial system brought spiritual renewal. He utilized both scriptural interpretation and Rabbinic commentaries to argue for the Messiahship of Jesus.

Baron did not think of himself an adherent of Messianic Judaism, which he considered to be dangerous. He warned against the movement, referring to its common insistence on Torah observance as "a hindrance" to spiritual development and an impediment to Christian unity.

=== Political views ===
Like his close associate Charles Andrew Schönberger, whose motto was "Christ and Israel, and Israel and Christ, are inseparable", Baron was a committed Zionist. He attended the First Zionist Congress in 1897 and every such meeting thereafter until 1906, writing reports on the discussions which were subsequently published in the long-running periodical Scattered Nation.

== Works ==
- Rays of Messiah's Glory (1886)
- The Jewish Problem - Its Solution or, Israel's Present and Future (1891)
- The Ancient Scriptures and the Modern Jew (1900)
- A Divine Forecast of Jewish History. A Proof of the Supernatural Element (1905)
- Types, Psalms, and Prophecies: Being a Series of Old Testament Studies. (1906)
- Israel's Inalienable Possessions: The Gifts and the Calling of God Which are Without Repentance (1906)
- The Shepherd of Israel and His scattered flock; a solution of the enigma of Jewish history. (1910)
- History of the Ten Lost Tribes: Anglo-Israelism Examined (1915)
- The Visions and Prophecies of Zechariah (1918)
- The Servant of Jehovah: The sufferings of the Messiah and the Glory that Should Follow. An Exposition of Isaiah LIII. (1922)
- The History of Israel: Its Spiritual Significance (19—)
- We have found the Messiah, translated by J. Rottenberg into Yiddish as מיר האבען געפונען דעם משיח, published in 1928.

Zechariah: A Commentary On His Visions And Prophecies
