= British-Israel-World Federation =

Organization that promotes British Israelism

The British-Israel-World Federation
- Formation: July 3, 1919; 107 years ago
- Headquarters: Bishop Auckland
- Location(s): Australia, Canada, New Zealand, South Africa, Netherlands, and the United Kingdom
- President: Dr Clifford Smyth
- Patrons: Lady Sara Allenby
- Website: britishisrael.co.uk

The British-Israel-World Federation (also stylized as the British-Israel World Federation) is a United Kingdom-based organization that promotes British Israelism, the historical belief that the people of the British Isles are direct descendants of the Ten Lost Tribes of ancient Israel. The group was founded in London on 3 July 1919, although its roots can be traced back to the 19th century.

== Background ==
In the 19th century, much of the British Israel movement was made up of smaller, localized associations. In 1919, some 80 independent associations throughout the British Isles, Australia, New Zealand, the Union of South Africa, Canada, and the United States joined into the British-Israel-World Federation.

The main patron of this movement was HRH The Countess of Athlone. She attended the federation's first Congress in July 1920, and remained a patron of the BIWF until her death in January 1981.

One of its founders was Reuben H. Sawyer, a clergyman in Portland, Oregon, where he was involved in setting up an Anglo-Israelism group and as leader of the Oregon Ku Klux Klan. He spoke to the Federation's first conference in 1920. Sawyer's supremacist views were influential in the development of the anti-semitic Christian Identity movement out of the philo-semitic British Israelism.

William Pascoe Goard was involved in early negotiations of developing the BIWF, and became vice president of the organisation in 1921. In 1922, Goard founded Covenant Publishing, the BIWF's publishing company. He also became the first editor of The National Message. The National Message was published until 1981. The federation now publishes The Covenant Nations magazine.

From 1924, the organization maintained an office next to Buckingham Palace. In 1990, it moved to Putney on the Thames, but since 2003 has been based near Bishop Auckland in County Durham.

== Beliefs ==
British Israelism (also called Anglo-Israelism) claims that people of Western Europe descent, particularly those in Great Britain, are the direct lineal descendants of the Ten Lost Tribes of Israel. The doctrine often includes the tenet that the British royal family is directly descended from King David.

The central tenets of British Israelism have been refuted by evidence from modern genetic, archaeological, ethnological, and linguistics and philological research.

== International endeavors ==
The British-Israel-World Federation, with its headquarters in the United Kingdom, has expanded to Australia, Canada, New Zealand, South Africa and the Netherlands.

== Patrons ==
The following is a list of patrons and vice-patrons of The British-Israel-World Federation.

=== Patrons ===
- HRH Princess Alice, Countess of Athlone, (1919–1981)
- Rt Hon. The Countess-Dowager of Radnor. (circa. 1920)
- The Duke of Buccleugh, K.T (circa. 1920)
- Rt Hon. Lord Gisborough, (circa. 1920)
- Rt Hon. Lord St. John of Bletsoe, (circa. 1920)
- Rt. Hev. The Bishop of the Falkland Islands, (circa. 1920)
- Rt. Hon William Massey P.C, (circa. 1920)
- Major-General C.A. Hadfield, (circa. 1920)
- Rt Rev. Bishop Primus emeritus John D.M. McLean,
- Rev Dr Barrie Williams,
- Lady Sara Allenby,

=== Vice-Patrons ===
- Countess Dowager of Clanwilliam, (circa 1920)
- Countess-Dowager of Castlestewart, (circa 1920)
- Marchioness-Dowager of Headfort (circa 1920)
- Dowager Lady Lurgan,
- Lady Wilma Lawson,
- Hon. Mrs Adolphus Graves,
- Lady Smith Dodsworth
- Laura Lady Grant
- Lady Peirse.
- Lady Standley,
- Rev. J.H. Allen (USA),
- Rt. Rev. Bishop Vaughan,
- Admiral Sir Richard H. Peirse,
- Lt-Col. Hon Stuart Plevdell-Bouverie,
- Sir James Outram,
- Mrs. Henry Byron,
- C.J. Clements,
- Rev. Samuel Clements, (USA)
- E. Cooke.
- M. Vincent Cox,
- M.T. Dalison,
- Col. J. Garnier,
- Rev. W. Pascoe Goard,
- Rev. A.B. Grimaldi,
- Col. F Gosset,
- T. Holbein Hendley,
- Col. Frederick Horniblow,
- Rev. Mark Jukes (Canada),
- His Hon. Judge Colbert Locke (Canada),
- Col. C.E.R. Mackesy, (circa. 1920) (New Zealand),
- Landseer MacKenzie,
- Rev. H.H. Macready,
- Rev. Wm. Patterson (Canada),
- Rev. R.H. Sawyer (USA),
- Rev. Merton Smith (Canada),
- Fordyce Thompson,
- Mary Woodward,
- Col. F Weldon,
- Rev. Philip Young,

== See also ==
- Canadian British-Israel Association
- Covenant Publishing Company
- William Pascoe Goard
