= The International Jew =

Antisemitic set of publications of the 1920s

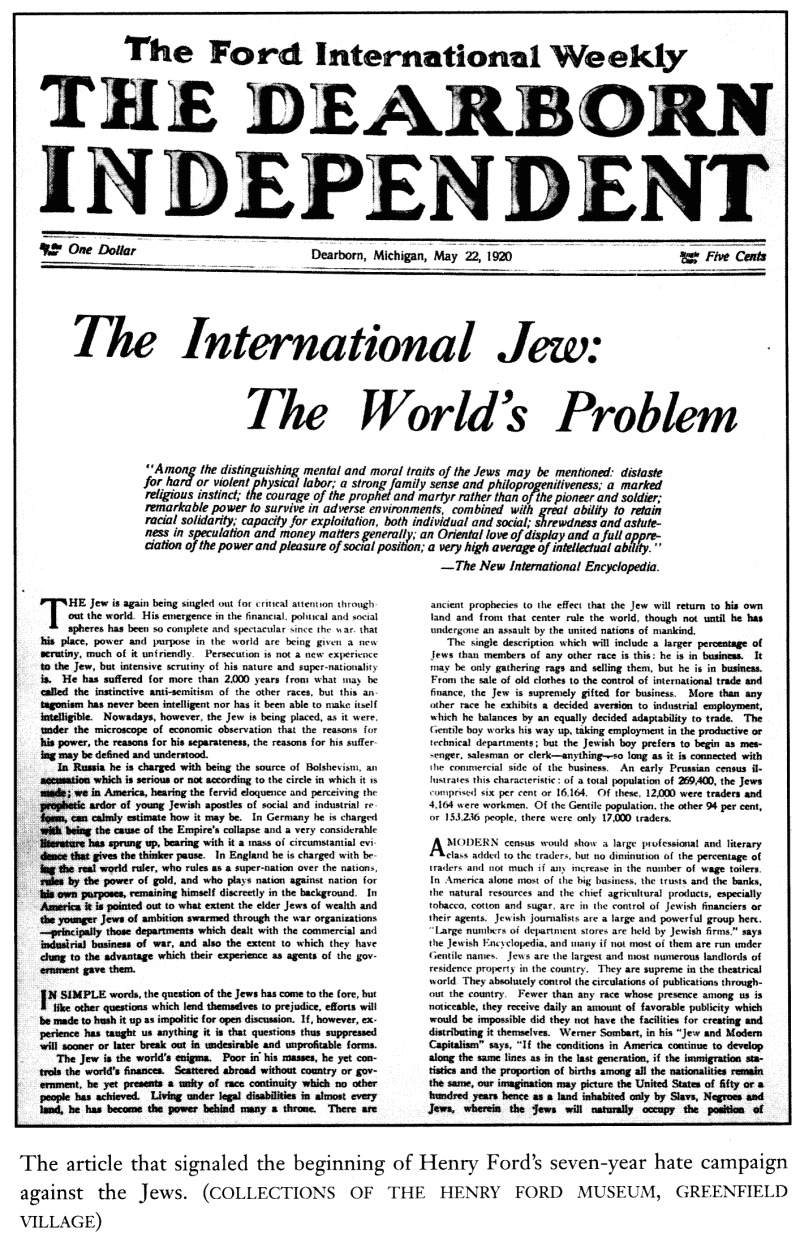
The International Jew, The World's Problem — 1920 articles in the Dearborn Independent

The International Jew is a four-volume set of antisemitic booklets or pamphlets originally published and distributed in the early 1920s by the Dearborn Publishing Company, an outlet owned by Henry Ford, an American industrialist and automobile manufacturer.

The booklets were a collection of articles originally serialized in Ford's Dearborn Independent newspaper, beginning with The International Jew: The World's Problem, published on May 22, 1920.

== Background ==
At the beginning of 1920, Ford's personal newspaper, The Dearborn Independent, was languishing in subscriptions and losing money. Ford and his personal secretary, Ernest G. Liebold, began to discuss a series of articles on the Jewish question. While it was Liebold who claimed to have come up with the title The International Jew, he turned to "the walking dictionary" William J. Cameron for most of the writing. For 91 issues, the weekly paper announced a variety of stories featuring the supposed evilness of Jewish influence.

Editor E. G. Pipp left the Independent in April 1920 in disgust with the planned antisemitic articles, which began in May; he was replaced by Cameron. While Ford did not personally write the articles, he expressed his opinions verbally to Cameron and Liebold. Cameron had the main responsibility for expanding these opinions into article form. Liebold was responsible for collecting more material to support the articles.

The most popular and aggressive stories were then chosen to be reprinted into four volumes called The International Jew. The first volume was published in November 1920 as an anthology of articles that had been published in the Independent from May 22 to October 2, 1920. The original print run of the first edition was estimated to be between 200,000 and 500,000 copies. Three additional volumes were published over the next 18 months.

Liebold never copyrighted The International Jew and therefore had no control over anyone else publishing it themselves. The book was ultimately translated into 16 languages, including six editions in Germany between 1920 and 1922, and has remained in the public domain.

== Libel suit ==
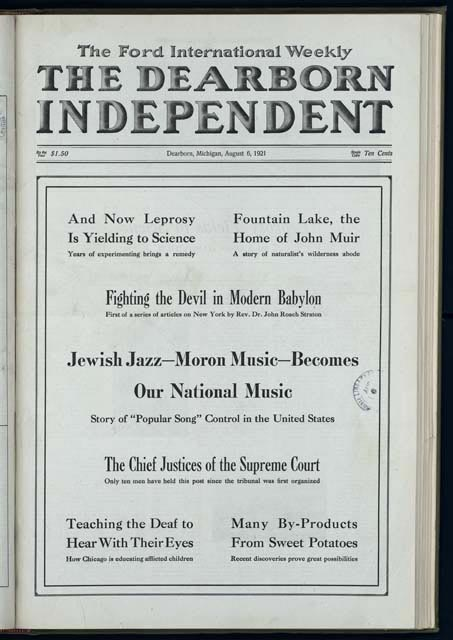
Jewish Jazz—Moron Music—Becomes Our National Music (Volume 3) – August 6, 1921

Following the publishing of an article in the Independent that alleged Jewish control of New York banks that were holding Texas cotton farmers hostage financially, San Francisco lawyer and Jewish farm cooperative organizer Aaron Sapiro sued Ford and Dearborn Publishing for libel in a $1 million lawsuit.

During the trial, William J. Cameron, the editor of Ford's "Own Page", testified that Ford had nothing to do with the editorials even though they were under his byline. Cameron testified at the libel trial that he never discussed the content of the pages nor sent them to Ford for his approval. Investigative journalist Max Wallace doubted the veracity of this claim and wrote that James M. Miller, a former Dearborn Independent employee, swore under oath that Ford had told him he intended to expose Sapiro.

According to political scientist Michael Barkun, "That Cameron would have continued to publish such controversial material without Ford's explicit instructions seemed unthinkable to those who knew both men. Mrs. Stanley Ruddiman, a Ford family intimate, remarked that 'I don't think Mr. Cameron ever wrote anything for publication without Mr. Ford's approval.'"

Ultimately, the libel suit led Ford to issue a retraction and public apology in which he indicated having been unaware of the nature of the remarks, both those published in the Independent, and the subsequent pamphlets, and was "shocked" by the content.

Soon after the trial, Ford closed the Independent on December 31, 1927.

== Influence on Nazi antisemitism ==
Ford's International Jew was translated into German in 1922 and cited as an influence by Baldur von Schirach, one of the Nazi leaders, who stated "I read it and became anti-Semitic. In those days this book made such a deep impression on my friends and myself because we saw in Henry Ford the representative of success, also the exponent of a progressive social policy. In the poverty-stricken and wretched Germany of the time, youth looked toward America, and apart from the great benefactor, Herbert Hoover, it was Henry Ford who to us represented America."

Praising American leadership in eugenics in his book Mein Kampf, Adolf Hitler considered Ford an inspiration, and noted this admiration in his book, calling him "a single great man". Hitler was also known to keep copies of The International Jew, as well as a large portrait of Ford in his Munich office.

== Content ==
After publication in the Independent, the articles were compiled as chapters into a four volume set as follows:

Volume 1: The International Jew: The World's Foremost Problem (1920)

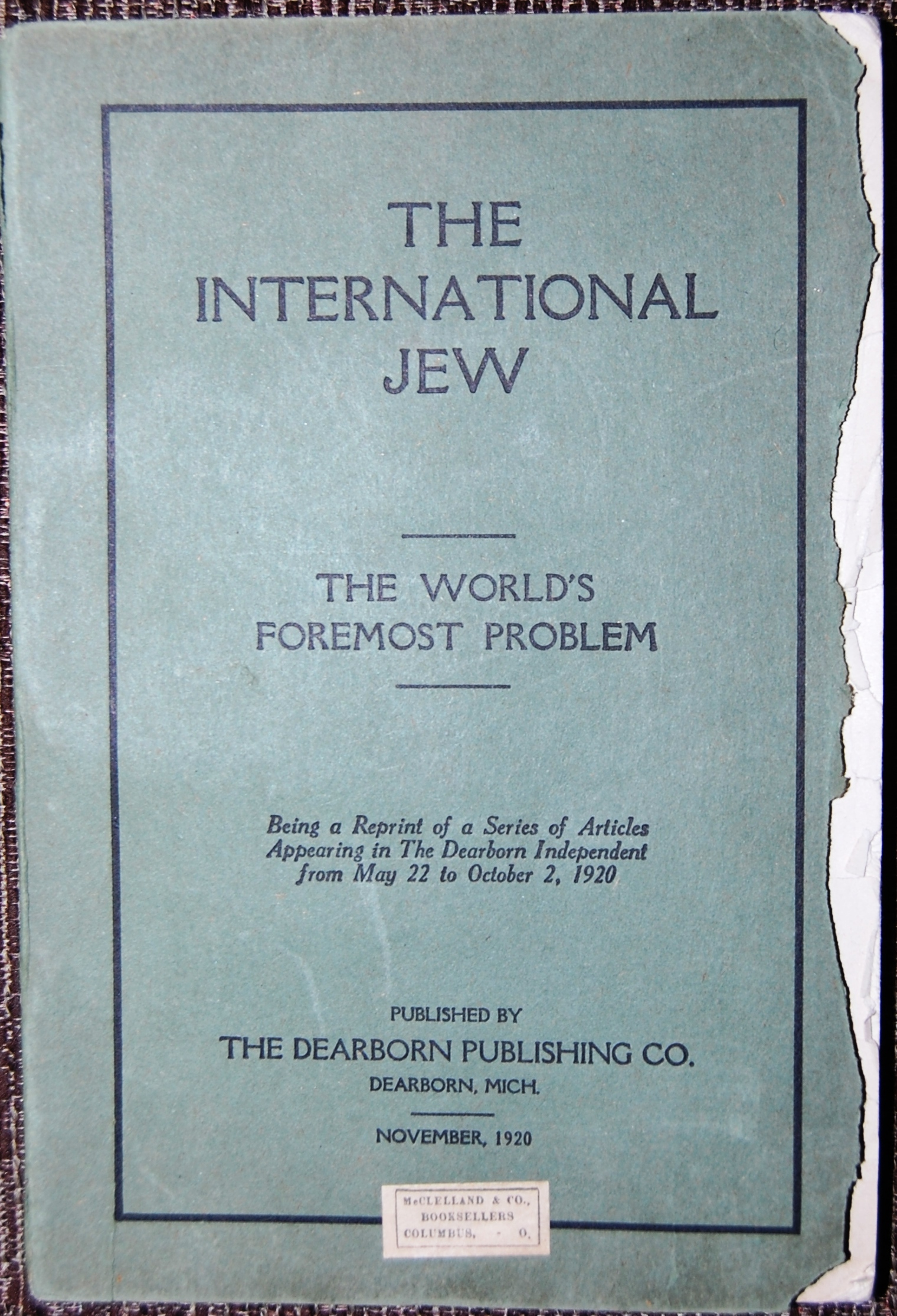
The International Jew: The World's Foremost Problem (Volume I) – November 1920 – 1st Edition

1. The Jew in Character and Business
2. Germany's Reaction Against the Jew
3. Jewish History in the United States
4. The Jewish Question—Fact or Fancy?
5. Anti-Semitism—Will It Appear in the U.S.?
6. Jewish Question Breaks Into the Magazines
7. Arthur Brisbane Leaps to the Help of Jewry
8. Does a Definite Jewish World Program Exist?
9. The Historic Basis of Jewish Imperialism
10. An Introduction to the "Jewish Protocols"
11. "Jewish" Estimate of Gentile Human Nature
12. "Jewish Protocols" Claim Partial Fulfillment
13. "Jewish" Plan to Split Society by "Ideas"
14. Did the Jews Foresee the World War?
15. Is the Jewish "Kahal" the Modern "Soviet"?
16. How the "Jewish Question" Touches the Farm
17. Does Jewish Power Control the World Press?
18. Does This Explain Jewish Political Power?
19. The All-Jewish Mark on "Red Russia"
20. Jewish Testimony in Favor of Bolshevism

Volume 2: Jewish Activities in the United States (1921)

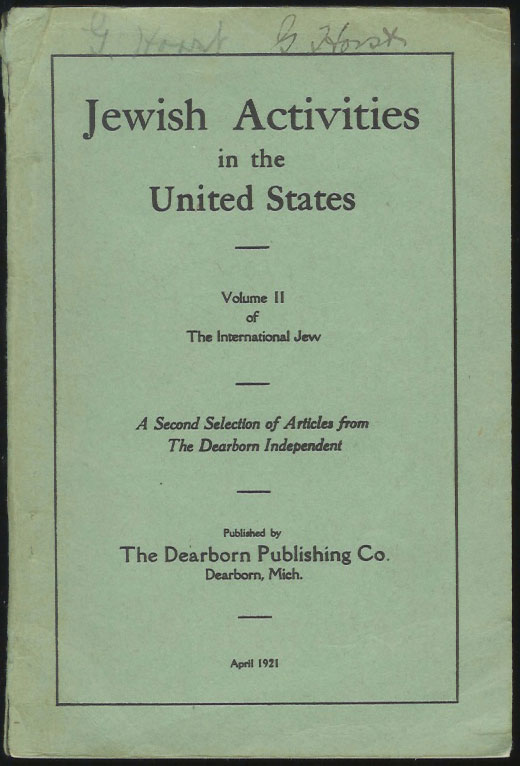
Jewish Activities in the United States (Volume 2) – April 1921

21. How Jews in the U.S. Conceal Their Strength
22. Jewish Testimony on "Are Jews a Nation?"
23. Jew Versus Non-Jew in New York Finance
24. The High and Low of Jewish Money Power
25. "Disraeli of America"—A Jew of Super-Power
26. The Scope of Jewish Dictatorship in the U.S.
27. Jewish Copper Kings Reap Rich War-Profits
28. Jewish Control of the American Theater
29. The Rise of the First Jewish Theatrical Trust
30. How Jews Capitalized a Protest Against Jews
31. The Jewish Aspect of the "Movie" Problem
32. Jewish Supremacy in Motion Picture World
33. Rule of the Jewish Kehillah Grips New York
34. The Jewish Demand for "Rights" in America
35. "Jewish Rights" Clash With American Rights
36. "Jewish Rights" to Put Studies Out of Schools
37. Disraeli—British Premier, Portrays the Jews
38. Taft Once Tried to Resist Jews—and Failed
39. When Editors Were Independent of the Jews
40. Why the Jews Dislike the Morgenthau Report
41. Jews Use the Peace Conference to Bind Poland
42. The Present Status of the Jewish Question

Volume 3: Jewish Influence in American Life (1921)

43. The Jews and the "Religious Persecution" Cry
44. Are the Jews Victims or Persecutors?
45. Jewish Gamblers Corrupt American Baseball
46. Jewish Degradation of American Baseball
47. Jewish Jazz Becomes Our National Music
48. How the Jewish Song Trust Makes You Sing
49. Jewish Hot-Beds of Bolshevism in the U.S.
50. Jew Trades Link With World Revolutionaries
51. Will Jewish Zionism Bring Armageddon?
52. How the Jews Use Power—By an Eyewitness
53. How Jews Ruled and Ruined Tammany Hall
54. Jew Wires Direct Tammany's Gentile Puppets
55. B'nai B'rith Leader Discusses the Jews
56. Dr. Levy, a Jew, Admits His People's Error
57. Jewish Idea in American Monetary Affairs
58. Jewish Idea Molded Federal Reserve Plan
59. Jewish Idea of Central Bank for America
60. How Jewish International Finance Functions
61. Jewish Power and America's Money Famine

Volume 4: Aspects of Jewish Power in the United States (1922)

62. How Jews Gained American Liquor Control
63. Gigantic Jewish Liquor Trust and Its Career
64. The Jewish Element in Bootlegging Evil
65. Angles of Jewish Influence in American Life
66. The Jews' Complaint Against "Americanism"
67. The Jewish Associates of Benedict Arnold
68. Benedict Arnold and Jewish Aid in Shady Deal
69. Arnold and His Jewish Aids at West Point
70. The Gentle Art of Changing Jewish Names
71. Jewish "Kol Nidre" and "Eli, Eli" Explained
72. Jews as New York Magistrates See Them
73. Jews Are Silent, the National Voice Is Heard
74. What Jews Attempted When they Had Power
75. The Jewish Question in Current Testimony
76. America's Jewish Enigma—Louis Marshall
77. The Economic Plans of International Jews
78. A Jew Sees His People As Others See Them
79. Candid Address to Jews on the Jewish Problem
80. An Address to "Gentiles" on the Jewish Problem

== Abridged version in 1949 ==
In June 1949, a 174-page, one-volume abridgement of the text appeared, titled The International Jew, subtitled "The World's Foremost Problem", edited by George F. Green, who was editor of the Independent Nationalist, a British fascist publication. The book was sold in the United States by the Christian Nationalist Crusade.

== See also ==
- Antisemitism in the United States
- New World Order (conspiracy theory)
- Zionist Occupation Government conspiracy theory
- The Eternal Jew (book)
- The International Jew, full text on Wikisource
