= The Dearborn Independent =

Former American newspaper established by Henry Ford

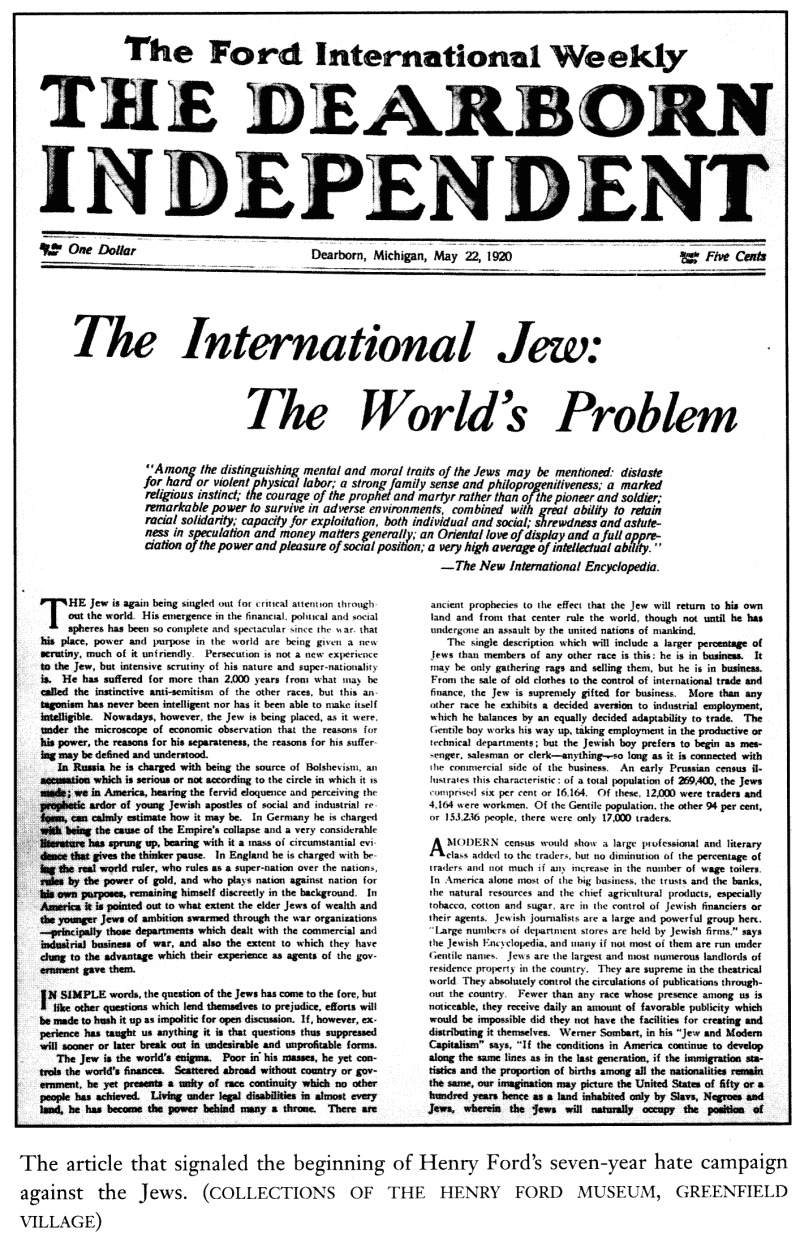
- The International Jew: The World's Problem in The Dearborn Independent, May 22, 1920
- Type: Weekly newspaper
- Publisher: Henry Ford (1919–1927)
- Founded: 1901
- Ceased publication: 1927
- Language: English
- City: Dearborn, Michigan
- Country: United States
- ISSN: 2378-0622 (print); 2378-0630 (web)
- OCLC number: 1566005

The Dearborn Independent, also known as The Ford International Weekly, was a weekly newspaper established in 1901, and published by Henry Ford from 1919 through 1927. At its height during the mid-1920s it claimed a circulation of between 700,000 and 900,000. This would have made it second only to The New York Times in terms of national readership. Such substantial readership numbers at the time resulted in part due to a quota system for promotion imposed on all Ford dealers.

Lawsuits regarding antisemitic material published in the paper caused Ford to close it, and the last issue was published in December 1927. The publication's title was derived from the Detroit suburb of Dearborn, Michigan. While Henry Ford owned The Dearborn Independent, none of its content was directly written by him, including the International Jew series, and in 1929 he signed a statement apologizing for the articles.

== Acquisition by Ford ==
In 1918, Ford's closest aide and private secretary, Ernest G. Liebold, purchased the Independent from Marcus Woodruff, who had been running it at a loss. The initial staff of the newspaper included E. G. Pipp, previously managing editor of The Detroit News, writers William J. Cameron (also formerly of the News) and Marcus Woodruff, and Fred Black as business manager.

The paper was printed on a used press purchased by Ford and installed in Ford's tractor plant in The Rouge. Publication under Ford was inaugurated in January 1919. The paper initially attracted notoriety in June 1919 with coverage of the libel lawsuit between Henry Ford and the Chicago Tribune, when stories written by Pipp and Cameron were picked up nationally.

== Ford's motivations ==
Henry Ford, a self-proclaimed pacifist who opposed World War I, believed that Jews were responsible for starting wars in order to profit from them: "International financiers are behind all war. They are what is called the international Jew: German Jews, French Jews, English Jews, American Jews. I believe that in all those countries except our own the Jewish financier is supreme ... here the Jew is a threat". Ford felt that Jews, in their role as financiers, contributed nothing of value to society. He believed that Jewish businesses focused solely on price and cheapened their products. Ford once bit into a candy bar and, finding it not as good as it once had been, said "The Jews have taken hold of it. They've cheapened it to make more money".

In 1915, Ford blamed Jews for instigating World War I, saying "I know who caused the war: German-Jewish bankers." In 1925, Ford said "What I oppose most is the international Jewish money power that is met in every war. That is what I oppose – a power that has no country and that can order the young men of all countries out to death."

Ford ensured that everyone who worked for any of his companies accepted his views and made sure not to hire a single Jew in office jobs, although Jews were permitted to be hired for physical labor jobs. So began the articles with themes of a worldwide conspiracy by Jews, including that Jews invented the stock market and gold standard just to corrupt the world and other peoples.

== Author of antisemitism in The Dearborn Independent ==
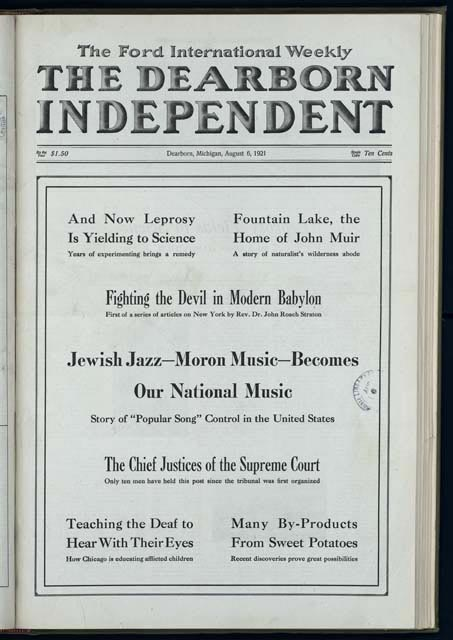
Jewish Jazz—Moron Music—Becomes Our National Music, August 6, 1921

E.G. Pipp left the Independent in April 1920 in disgust when he heard of planned antisemitic articles coming, which began in May. Pipp later claimed that a major influence on the paper's antisemitism came from Boris Brasol, a White Russian émigré lawyer, writer, and conspiracy theorist. Henry Ford did not write any of the articles. Ford expressed his opinions verbally to his executive secretary, Ernest Liebold, and to William J. Cameron, who replaced Pipp as editor. Cameron had the main responsibility for expanding these opinions into article form. Liebold was responsible for collecting more material to support the articles.

One of the articles, "Jewish Power and America's Money Famine", asserted that the power exercised by Jews over the nation's supply of money was insidious, depriving farmers and others outside the banking coterie of money when they needed it most. The article asked the question: "Where is the American gold supply? ... It may be in the United States but it does not belong to the United States." It concluded that Jews controlled the gold supply and, hence, American money.

Another article, "Jewish Idea Molded Federal Reserve System", was a reflection of Ford's distrust of the Federal Reserve System and its proponent, Paul Warburg. Ford believed the Federal Reserve system was secretive and insidious.

These articles gave rise to claims of antisemitism against Ford, and in 1929 he signed a statement apologizing for the articles.

While Henry Ford owned The Dearborn Independent, none of its content was directly written by him, including the International Jew series. However, the views expressed in The International Jew reflected Ford's own antisemitic views, especially because nothing was published without Ford's final approval. This series of antisemitic articles in The Dearborn Independent was published for a total of 91 weeks. The articles pinned cultural developments such as jazz, immoral books, and alcohol consumption on the Jews and Jewish influence. Partially attributable to his antisemitic beliefs, Adolf Hitler was a fan of Ford, and had a full-length portrait of Ford at the headquarters of the Nazi Party.

== The Protocols of the Elders of Zion ==
Many issues of the Independent commented extensively upon The Protocols of the Elders of Zion. The first mention of the Protocols appears in the issue of July 10, 1920, the seventh installment of its "International Jew" series. Also, in 1920–21 the Independent carried a series of articles expanding on the themes of financial control by Jews, entitled:

1. Jewish Idea in American Monetary Affairs: The remarkable story of Paul Warburg, who began work on the United States monetary system after three weeks residence in this country
2. Jewish Idea Molded Federal Reserve System: What Baruch was in War Material, Paul Warburg was in War Finances; Some Curious revelations of money and politics.
3. Jewish Idea of a Central Bank for America: The evolution of Paul M. Warburg's idea of Federal Reserve System without government management.
4. How Jewish International Finance Functions: The Warburg family and firm divided the world between them and did amazing things which non-Jews could not do
5. Jewish Power and America's Money Famine: The Warburg Federal Reserve sucks money to New York, leaving productive sections of the country in disastrous need.
6. The Economic Plan of International Jews: An outline of the Protocolists' monetary policy, with notes on the parallel found in Jewish financial practice.

The newspaper published The Protocols of the Elders of Zion, which was discredited by The Times of London as a forgery during the Independent's publishing run. The American Jewish Historical Society described the ideas presented in the magazine as "anti-immigrant, anti-labor, anti-liquor, and antisemitic". In February 1921, the New York World published an interview with Ford in which he said: "The only statement I care to make about the Protocols is that they fit in with what is going on." During this period, Ford emerged as "a respected spokesman for right-wing extremism and religious prejudice", reaching around 700,000 readers through his newspaper.

== Republication in Germany ==
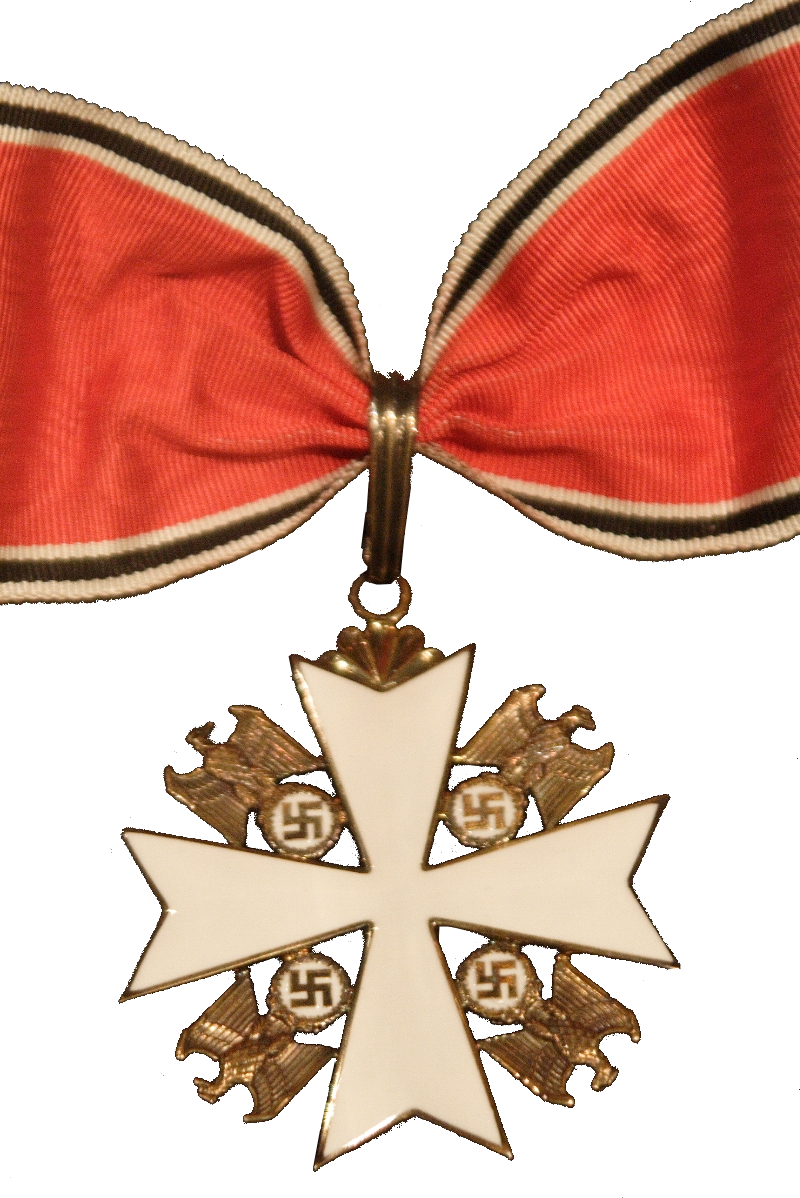
Grand Cross of the German Eagle, an award bestowed on Ford by Nazi Germany

During the Weimar Republic in the early 1920s, the Protocols was reprinted and published in Germany, along with anti-Jewish articles first published by The Dearborn Independent and reprinted in translation in Germany as a set of four bound volumes, cumulatively titled The International Jew, the World's Foremost Problem.

Steven Watts wrote that Adolf Hitler "revered" Ford. He quotes Hitler as saying, "I shall do my best to put his theories into practice in Germany" and says that Hitler modeled the Volkswagen, the people's car, on the Model T. Several themes from The Dearborn Independent articles appear in Mein Kampf. Hitler even quoted The Dearborn Independent in Mein Kampf, and Henry Ford was the only American that Hitler specifically named: "Every year they [the Jews] manage to become increasingly the controlling masters of the labor power of a people of 120,000,000 souls; one great man, Ford, to their exasperation still holds out independently there even now."

On February 1, 1924, Ford received Kurt Lüdecke, a representative of Hitler, at his home. Lüdecke was introduced to Ford by Siegfried Wagner (son of the famous composer Richard Wagner) and his wife Winifred, both Nazi sympathizers and antisemites. Lüdecke asked Ford for a contribution to the Nazi cause, though this is denied by the Ford Motor Company.

In July 1938, prior to the outbreak of war, the German consul at Cleveland gave Ford, on his 75th birthday, the award of the Grand Cross of the German Eagle, the highest medal Nazi Germany could bestow on a foreigner. James D. Mooney, vice-president of overseas operations for General Motors, received a similar medal, the Merit Cross of the German Eagle, First Class.

== Reaction to The Dearborn Independent ==
=== Jewish reaction ===
There are many accounts of Jewish organizations coming together to fight The Dearborn Independent. The first major antisemitic article about Jews was published on June 19, 1920. There were major repetitions on August 28, then again in February, March, and November 1921. The essay "Anti-Semitism- Will it Appear in the U.S.?" quoted Louis Brandeis, a Justice of the Supreme Court, who advocated for Jewish civil rights and said, "Organize, organize, organize, until every Jew must stand up and be counted." Louis Marshall noticed that The Cause of World Unrest was advertised on the back of one issue of the Independent, so he wrote a personal letter to the publisher, Major George Haven Putnam, condemning him for his intolerance. Marshall said that Putnam was using Jews as his scapegoat. Eventually Putnam apologized for his advertisement and for publishing the book.

=== Non-Jewish reaction ===
The Federal Council of Churches of Christ in America published a resolution condemning Ford's propaganda and beliefs. In January 1921, a statement titled "The Peril of Racial Prejudice" denounced antisemitism as un-American and condemned the Independent for its antisemitic campaign. It was signed by more than 100 prominent citizens of "Gentile birth and Christian faith", including President Woodrow Wilson, former president William Howard Taft, William Jennings Bryan, Clarence Darrow, Nicholas Murray Butler, Robert Frost, Samuel Seabury, Ida Tarbell, Paul Cravath, and the presidents of Williams, Oberlin, and Dartmouth colleges, as well as those of Princeton, Cornell, and Syracuse universities. However, this did not stop The Dearborn Independent from their negative press regarding Jews.

== Libel lawsuit ==
While they explicitly condemned pogroms and violence against Jews, Ford's articles blamed the Jews for provoking incidents of mass violence. San Francisco lawyer and Jewish farm cooperative organizer Aaron Sapiro filed a libel lawsuit in response. During the trial, the editor of Ford's "Own Page", William Cameron, testified that Ford had nothing to do with the editorials even though they were under his byline. Cameron testified that he never discussed the content of the pages with Ford, or sent them to Ford for his approval. Friends and business associates said they warned Ford about the contents of the Independent and that Ford probably never read the articles (he claimed he only read the headlines).

Further court testimony alleged that Ford knew about the contents of the Independent in advance of publication. Investigative journalist Max Wallace noted that "whatever credibility this absurd claim [Cameron's denial] may have had was soon undermined when James M. Miller, a former Dearborn Independent employee, swore under oath that Ford had told him he intended to expose Sapiro."

Michael Barkun observed:

That Cameron would have continued to publish such controversial material without Ford's explicit instructions seemed unthinkable to those who knew both men. Mrs. Stanley Ruddiman, a Ford family intimate, remarked that 'I don't think Mr. Cameron ever wrote anything for publication without Mr. Ford's approval.'

== Action by the Anti-Defamation League ==
The trial prompted the Anti-Defamation League (ADL) to begin a concerted effort to oppose the Independent. An ADL–led coalition of Jewish groups led the charge, and raised objections to Ford's writings in the Detroit press. The ADL also organized a boycott of Ford products, which was supported not only by Jews, but also by several liberal Christian groups. In December 1927, Ford gave in and abolished the paper. News reports at the time quoted him as saying he was shocked by the paper's content and unaware of its nature. Ford also wrote a public letter to ADL president Sigmund Livingston recanting his antisemitic views.

Ford's 1927 apology was generally well-received: "Four-Fifths of the hundreds of letters addressed to Ford in July 1927 were from Jews, and almost without exception they praised the Industrialist." While most of the major national Jewish and non-Jewish newspapers accepted Ford's apology, many local Jewish papers rejected it. In January 1937, a Ford statement to The Detroit Jewish Chronicle disavowed "any connection whatsoever with the publication in Germany of a book known as The International Jew."

According to Pool and Pool (1978), Ford's retraction and apology (which were written by others) were not signed by him (rather, his signature was forged by Harry Bennett), and Ford never privately recanted his antisemitic views, stating in 1940: "I hope to republish The International Jew again some time."

== See also ==
- List of defunct newspapers of the United States
- The International Jew

== Sources ==
- Ford R. Bryan: Henry's Lieutenants. Detroit, Mich.: Wayne State University Press, 1993. ISBN 0-8143-2428-2
- Albert Lee: Henry Ford and the Jews. New York: Stein and Day, 1980. ISBN 0-8128-2701-5
- Pool, James; Pool, Suzanne (1978), "'Chapter: Ford and Hitler'", Who Financed Hitler: The Secret Funding of Hitler's Rise to Power, 1919–1933, Dial Press, ISBN 978-0708817568.
- Max Wallace: The American Axis: Henry Ford, Charles Lindbergh and the Rise of the Third Reich. New York: St. Martin's Press, 2003. ISBN 0-312-29022-5
