= J. H. Allen =

American minister (1847–1930)

John Harden Allen (1847 – May 14, 1930) was an American minister associated with the Church of God (Holiness), and British Israelism. He came from Illinois, later moving to Missouri in 1879. Originally a pastor in the Methodist Episcopal Church, he later became a pastor in the Wesleyan Methodist Church in California. He was one of the co-founders of the Church of God (Holiness) in 1883. He "evangelized throughout the West and eventually moved to Pasadena, California, where he died". He wrote Judah's Sceptre and Joseph's Birthright in 1902, and around 1917 he produced a publication entitled Stone Kingdom Herald.

== Judah's Sceptre and Joseph's Birthright (1902) ==
Allen is best known for his book titled Judah's Sceptre and Joseph's Birthright, which states that it is: "An Analysis of the Prophecies of the Scriptures in regard to the Royal Family of Judah and the Many Nations of Israel, the Lost Ten Tribes."

A review in the Baptist Messenger reported:

This is one of the most interesting volumes we have read in many a day and we confess that the arguments produced by Mr. Allen seem to be unanswerable. It is more thrilling than Western fiction. The description of the scarlet thread, the royal remnant, and the part played by Jeremiah in the preservation of the ruler for David's throne, will cause you to lose sleep rather than go to bed without knowing the outcome.

== Overview of publication ==
When the book first appeared, the British Empire was still at its height, which is why many came to believe that the British were "God's People" and an introduction to the book claimed that:

A notable and immensely significant sign of the times is the revival of interest in Old Testament prophecy that is beginning to be strongly felt in Anglo-Saxon countries. This book presents facts and considerations which everyone must sometime take into account, for they are destined to become important factors in world affairs.

=== Contents ===
Judah's Sceptre and Joseph's Birthright is divided into three parts:

Part one addresses the claim that God made a promise to Abraham that his descendants would become many nations. The chapters are:

Judah's Sceptre and Joseph's Birthright; Race Versus Grace; The Sceptre and The Birthright; Jacob's Seed Divided Into Two Kingdoms; All Israelites Are Not Jews; The Broken Brotherhood; Ephraim-Samaria – Israel's Idolatry; Samaria-Israel Cast Out And Cast Off; The Jews Go To Babylon And Return; Joseph-Israel Lost.

In part two the topics discussed are the promise to David of a perpetuated throne and Kingdom. The chapters are:

The Sceptre And The Davidic Covenant; Jeremiah's Call And Commission; The Tearing Down And Rooting Out; Vindication Of The Personal Promises Of Jeremiah; A Royal Remnant That Escapes; The Prince Of The Scarlet Thread; The "Prince Of The Scarlet Thread" And "The Royal Remnant" United.

Part three claims to uncover the Abrahamic Nations. The chapters covered are:

Lost Israel And The First Overturn Located; Jacob's Pillow-Pillar Stone; The Other Overturns; Dan --The Serpent's Trail; Israel In The Isles; A Few More Identities; A Study In "Scarlet"; Egypt-Israelitish And Anglo-Saxon Emblems; The Two-Fold Aspect Of Prophetic Israel; The Coming Exodus.

== See also ==
- Bible prophecy
- Christianity and Judaism
- Jewish Christian
- Judeo-Christian
- Messianic Judaism
- Ten Lost Tribes
