= Aracy de Carvalho =

Brazilian diplomatic clerk (1908–2011)

- Born: 20 April 1908; Rio Negro, Paraná
- Died: 28 February 2011 (aged 102); São Paulo
- Other names: "Angel of Hamburg", for having saved several Jews from death during the Second World War
- Spouse: João Guimarães Rosa

Aracy de Carvalho Guimarães Rosa (née Aracy Moebius de Carvalho) (5 December 1908 – 28 February 2011) was a Brazilian diplomatic clerk who has been recognized with the title of Righteous Among the Nations.

== Early life ==
Born to a German mother in Rio Negro, Paraná, Aracy de Carvalho was able to speak German, English, French and her native Portuguese. She moved to São Paulo. She lived there with her German first husband Johannes Edward Ludwig Tess and their child until 1935, when they separated.

== Humanitarian work ==
In 1936, she was appointed to the Brazilian Consulate in Hamburg, Germany, where she was made the Chief of the Passport Section. She started to help Jewish people during Kristallnacht, on 9 November 1938. She handed out visas to Jews without the red "J" that identified them as such, since Brazilian Dictator Getúlio Vargas non-officially denied visas to Jews. She was in close relations with underground activists in Germany and would even grant visas to Jews that she knew had forged passports. In 1938 she met fellow diplomat and assistant-Consul João Guimarães Rosa, who would later become her second husband, and one of the most important Brazilian writers. His magnum opus, Grande Sertão: Veredas, was dedicated to her. With his help, she intensified her humanitarian activity, saving a great number of Jews from imprisonment and death. She remained in Germany until 1942, when Brazil broke relations with Germany and joined the Allied Forces.

== Recognition ==
On 8 July 1982, Aracy de Carvalho became one of the two Brazilians honoured by the Yad Vashem with the Righteous Among the Nations award, together with Ambassador Luiz Martins de Souza Dantas.

She is depicted in the 2021 biographical TV miniseries Passport to Freedom. Brazilian actress Sophie Charlotte portrays Aracy de Carvalho.

== Death ==
In her late days Aracy de Carvalho suffered from Alzheimer's disease. She died peacefully at the age of 102, in her home in São Paulo, on 28 February 2011, due to natural causes.

== See also ==
- Abdol Hossein Sardari
- Ángel Sanz Briz
- Aristides de Sousa Mendes
- Chiune Sugihara
- Gilberto Bosques Saldívar
- Giorgio Perlasca
- Ho Feng-Shan
- Individuals and groups assisting Jews during the Holocaust
- Irena Sendler
- Jan Zwartendijk
- Jewish settlement in the Japanese Empire
- John Rabe
- Ładoś Group
- Luiz Martins de Souza Dantas
- Mir Yeshiva (Belarus)
- Nansen passport
- Nicholas Winton
- Oskar Schindler
- Persona Non Grata (2015 film)
- Raoul Wallenberg
- Setsuzo Kotsuji
- Tatsuo Osako
- Thomas Hildebrand Preston
- Varian Fry

== Further readings ==
- Mordecai Paldiel (2007). Diplomat Heroes of the Holocaust. Jersey City, NY: Ktav. p. 26. ISBN 978-0-88125-909-4.
- Schpun, Mônica Raïsa. Justa. Aracy de Carvalho e o resgate de judeus: trocando a Alemanha nazista pelo Brasil. Rio de Janeiro, Brazil: Civilização Brasileira, 2011, 526 p. ISBN 978-8-52000-991-8.
