= International Raoul Wallenberg Foundation =

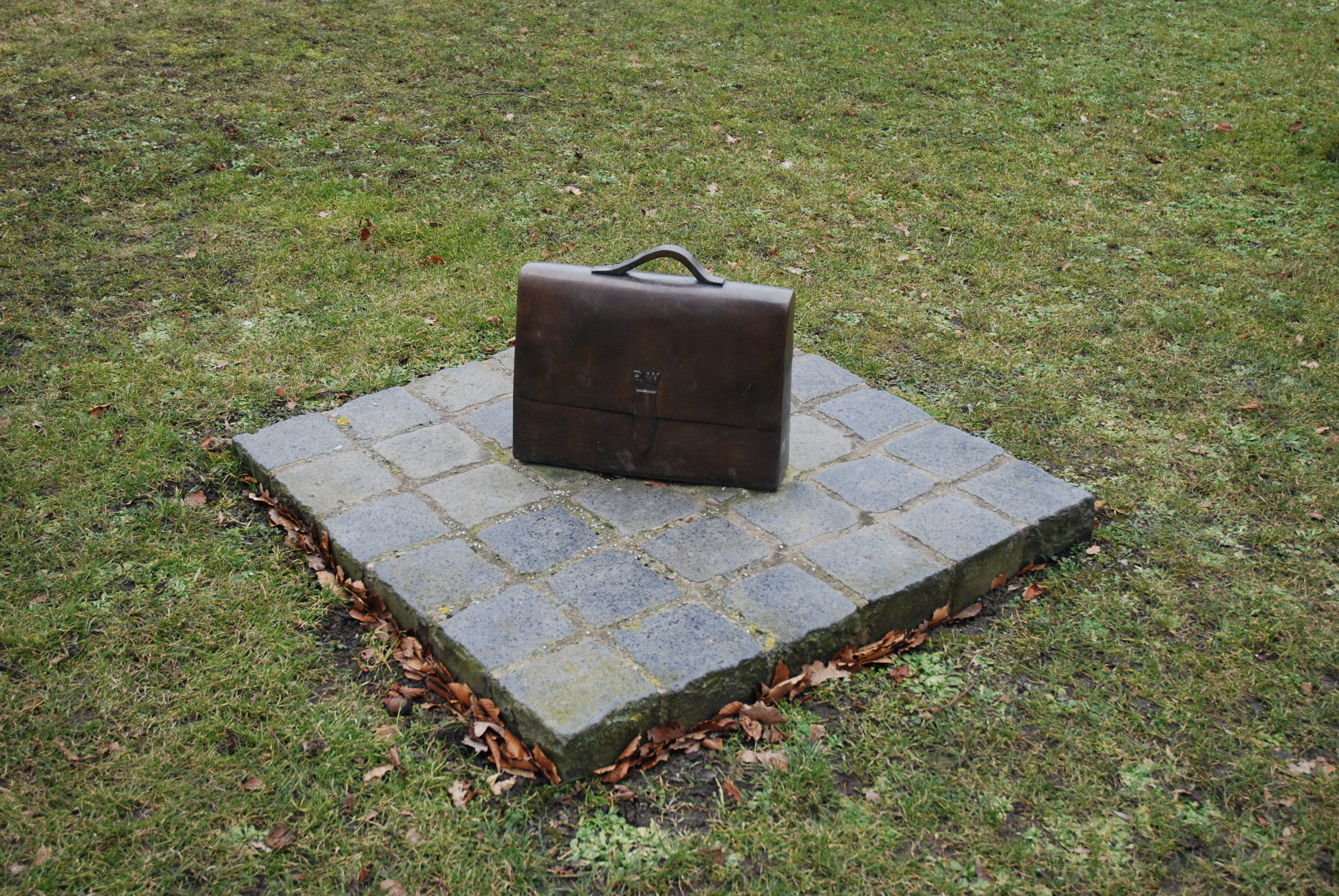
Ulla Kraitz' Hope, part of the Raoul Wallenberg Monument outside the UN HQ in New York, bronze, 1998. (This copy is located outside Skissernas Museum in Lund, Sweden).

The International Raoul Wallenberg Foundation (IRWF) is a non-governmental organization which researches Holocaust rescuers and advocates for their recognition. The organization developed educational programs for school to promote peace and civil service. Founded by Baruch Tenembaum, it has offices in Buenos Aires, New York, Berlin, Rio de Janeiro, and Jerusalem.

The organization bears the name of Raoul Wallenberg, a Swedish diplomat who saved Jews and other persecuted people in Hungary during the Holocaust. He was captured by the Soviet Union and his death has been the source of controversy and secrecy.

On 27 October 2023, the Foundation revoked the Honorary Membership of António Guterres, Secretary-General of the United Nations, following his declaration that the 7 October 2023 Hamas-led attack on Israel "did not come in a vacuum".

== Research ==
IRWF is primarily a historical research organization, collecting information on different cases of rescuing during the Holocaust. As part of the research, the foundation gathers survivors saved by Wallenberg and others like him to interview them for the purposes of research and historic memory preservation. IRWF posts the transcripts online for others to read and use.

IRWF also identifies and commemorates safe houses.

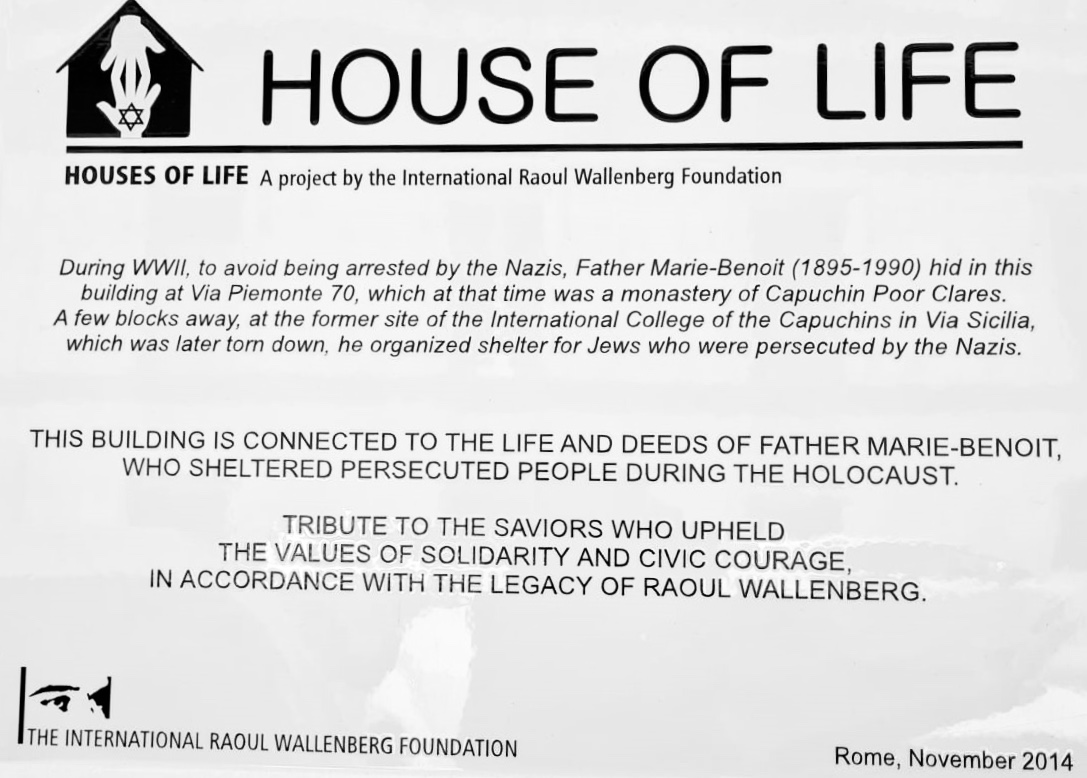

It recently has pushed for researching more women saviors, dedicating a special section on their English language website for them. IRWF aims for its research subjects and honorees to gain official recognition by their local governments and organizations.

In addition to Wallenberg, the IRWF has researched and honored numerous Rescuers of the Holocaust, such as:

- Carlo Angela
- Per Anger
- Princess Alice of Battenberg
- Gitta Bauer
- Père Marie-Benoît
- Andris Bērziņš
- Friedrich Born
- Gilberto Bosques Saldívar
- Aracy de Carvalho Guimarães Rosa
- Irene Gut Opdyke
- Jan Karski
- Maria Kotarba
- Carl Lutz
- Necdet Kent
- George Mantello
- Dorothea Neff
- Giovanni Palatucci
- Giorgio Perlasca
- Dimitar Peshev
- Eduardo Propper de Callejón
- Manuel Quezon
- Angelo Roncalli
- Irena Sendler
- Ho Feng-Shan
- Aristides de Sousa Mendes
- Luis Martins de Souza Dantas
- Suzanne Spaak
- Chiune Sugihara
- Otto Weidt
- Nicholas Winton

== Campaigns ==
The organization has many humanitarian campaigns. Aimed to put pressure on the Russian government to release an official statement of what happened to Wallenberg, IRWF created two campaigns. The 'Bring Raoul Home' campaign asks dignitaries to address Wallenberg’s case in the correspondence and official meetings with the Russian Government; and the '100,000 Names for 100,000 Lives' campaign, which aims to get 100,000 people to sign the petition who then will be conveyed to the Russian President. As of August 12, 2010, IRWF has gotten 27,204 signatures for its '100,000 Names for 100,000 Lives' campaign.

Dignitaries that have written letters on Wallenberg's behalf include Argentine Congressman Federico Pinedo, American Researcher on the German resistance to the Third Reich Greg McClelland, the Nobel Prize Winners in Chemistry Paul J. Crutzen, Yuan T. Lee and Herbert A. Hauptman, President of the Republic of Croatia Stjepan Mesic, and Mayor of Or Yehuda (Israel) Itzhak Buchovza.

IRWF also campaigns for public sites to be named after Wallenberg. Parks, streets and schools across the globe bear his name in the United States, Brazil, Argentina, Spain, Ecuador, Uruguay and others.

== The arts ==
IRWF has an art gallery in its New York City Headquarters, where it exhibits work done by Holocaust survivors or those who have been inspired by Rescuers of the Holocaust. The Foundation will often co-organize film screenings and theatre productions based on Wallenberg and other rescuers.

In April, 2010, the IRWF commissioned an exhibit by painter Peter Bulow. The exhibit "Blessings May Break from Stone" featured statues of Raoul Wallenberg and Luiz Martins de Souza Dantas. Bulow's mother is a Holocaust survivor from Budapest, Hungary.

== Education ==
IRWF has created many different educational programs for different student levels. For middle school to higher education, there are resources for both students and teachers that are free for public use and easily accessible online. The program emphasizes the values of courage and integrity.

== Wallenberg Day ==
The organization has advocated for having October 5, the date in which Wallenberg became an Honorary American citizen, proclaimed as Raoul Wallenberg Day across the U.S. The purpose of the commemorative day is to promote peace and the values that come with humanitarianism, while remembering Wallenberg and his deeds. The day is recognized annually in the State of New York and the IRWF campaigns had led to Wallenberg Days proclamations in Colorado, Connecticut, Illinois, Iowa, Maine, Maryland, Michigan, Minnesota, Missouri, Nebraska, Nevada, New Jersey, New Mexico, Pennsylvania, West Virginia, and Wyoming.
