= Mookie Tenembaum =

Argentine artist (born 1955)

- Born: 1955 (age 69–70); Buenos Aires, Argentina
- Father: Baruch Tenembaum

Philosophical work
- Era: 21st-century philosophy
- Region: Western Philosophy
- School: Atomism, skepticism, hedonism, empiricism probabilism founder of Disillusionism
- Main interests: ontology, ethology, biology, linguistics, epistemology, conceptual art, political sciences, law, technology
- Notable ideas: Autothanatodeimia, Illusions, Anti-Forms, Matterity, Egosphere, Willingness and aptitude, Attentionism.

Mookie Tenembaum (born 1955) is an Argentine-born polymath; philosopher, lawyer, inventor, conceptual multidisciplinary artist, and radio host.

Tenembaum's philosophy, first published under the title "Disillusionism" in 2012, revolving around original concepts like "Autothanatodeimia", "Illusions" and "Anti-Forms", introduce original and critical perspectives on human behavior and organization.

Tenembaum's work reflects his views on the State, freedom, and ecology. For instance, he placed a ton of ice in the Plaza de Mayo in Buenos Aires and named it Placebo. He also caused controversy by publicly projecting on the chest and backs of six half-naked ballerinas two video spots: one a popular Coca-Cola TV ad in which a polar bear played with a baby seal and shared a Coke with it while in the opposite one polar bear hunts and bloodily devours a baby seal, he named the piece Bearshit.

Since December 2015, Tenembaum leads a morning radio show called El Observador Internacional, in which he analyses the landscape of international politics.

== Biography ==
He attended Law School and specialized in Anthropology at Temple University of Philadelphia. As a lawyer, he also worked as a city attorney. During the 90s he decided that some of his ideas could only be created and developed through art, especially art related to new technologies. Therefore, during the past years, Mookie has concentrated specifically on reflecting on the different problems related to the State using creating new-media works. Currently, Mookie is working on pieces having to do with the different social and ideological problems of the state, developing projects such as "Genesis", which uses an online system that generates "trusts" with the status of juridical persons, it reveals how the State presents "traps" in their formulation and efficiency, which are not easily readable for most citizens. With this type of project, Mookie makes them visible, strongly criticizing the State apparatus ruling Latin America. Chasing utopian goals, with his projects Mookie proposes social reinvention and, as a consequence, foundation. His compasses in this goal are George Orwell, J.J. Rousseau, and John Locke's theories, as well as Minarchist ideas. An expert on the Internet and new technologies, Mookie is a member of FiRE (Future in Review) an annual event that gathers one hundred people from all over the world to discuss the likely penetration of the latest technological innovations and their impact on a not so far away future. He also founded United Virtualities, a company of online systems, and created over twenty online technologies, such as Ooqa Ooqa (Explorer's enhanced native toolbar), Schvitzer (an intelligent text highlighter), Shoshkele (Animated floated ads that were named after his favorite daughter), and Yachne (a 3D animated messenger).

His art piece "Paranoia" was awarded the highest prize in 2008 official Salón Nacional de Bellas Artes the most prestigious award in Argentina.

Recently he was featured on CNN's "Cala".

His works have been the object of numerous individuals and collective in his native Argentina, and abroad.

Concurrently, Tenembaum's philosophical work started with a virulent critique of "Illusions", which is the term he uses to dub States, Religions, Families, and other such juridical persons. His is a deconstructive critique revolving around the fundamental claim that these Illusions are nothing but onerous fever phantasms spawned by each physical person's terror of death, or ATD (after its Ancient Greek initials Auto-Thanatos-Deimia).

As of late, Tenembaum's system of Disillusionism has expanded into a wider discussion of human ethology. According to him, behavioral modernity, depends not only upon ATD and Illusions, but also upon the neuro-physiology that explains the pain, relief, pleasure, memory, anticipation, and other rival contenders for the very limited attentional span of human animals. Furthermore, Disillusionism relies heavily upon negativity and discarding as driving forces behind both human evolution and common sense.

On a practical note, Tenembaum's philosophy also distinguishes animal aptitude from each individual's actual willingness to apply the abilities it possesses. Drawing a parallel with the ancestral packs, in which a division of attention and tasks was biologically enforced amongst individuals, Disillusionism attempts to make sense of the exchanges and relationships inside each human individual's Egosphere, and discuses the part Common Sense might play in optimizing such organization.

Tenembaum is the father of five children and the eldest son of Baruch Tenembaum, founder of the International Raoul Wallenberg Foundation and is a resident of Paraguay.

== Exhibitions ==
- DISILLUSIONISM - March 3–23, 2012 - curated by Luis Campos at White Box, New York http://www.whiteboxny.org/
