= Robert Lewin (art dealer) =

- Born: Boruch Lewin; 23 December 1918; Warsaw, Poland
- Died: 17 May 2004 (aged 85); London, England
- Occupation(s): Art dealer, philanthropist
- Spouse(s): Bronia Medrzycki (1947–1954); Rena Langer (1957–2002)

Robert Lewin (23 December 1918 – 17 May 2004) was a Polish art dealer and philanthropist.

== Biography ==
Born Boruch Lewin in Warsaw, Poland, Lewin was the son of a Polish-Jewish banker Jacob, and Yochewet. With the rise of Hitler's anti-Jewish Nuremberg Laws, Lewin's father decided to relocate the family to the South of France. At the same time Lewin began studying at Pembroke College, Oxford in 1938 before being recalled to Poland for military service, so he left Oxford to fight for his homeland against the Nazis. Fleeing east in November 1939 after the German invasion of Poland, he survived the war after managing to get a Japanese visa from the consul in Kaunas, Lithuania, the 'Japanese Schindler,' Chiune Sugihara. He arrived in Kobe, Japan, in February 1941 and had issued Polish passport issued in Tokyo. Later he was moved by Japan authorities to Shanghai where he stayed until Allied liberation in 1945. He became to know that his brother Michel had survived in hiding in France, both their parents had been arrested in Nice in August 1942 and deported to German Nazi camp Auschwitz.

While arriving to England after the war, he changed his name to Robert (Bob). He was married in 1947 to Bronia Medrzycki (marriage ended in 1954). Bob met Rena Fisch Langer and married in 1957. Rena was an active worker for the Pioneer Women of Great Britain - a British-Zionist labour movement.

Lewin later became an art dealer in London and a noted philanthropist, endowing a chair of Philosophy at Pembroke College, Oxford, and a gallery at the Israel Museum, Jerusalem. He also made bequests to the Ashmolean Museum in Oxford. He died on 17 May 2004 at the Hospital of St John and St Elisabeth, London.
