= John G. Stoessinger =

American author

- Born: October 14, 1927; Vienna, Austria
- Died: November 20, 2017 (aged 90); National City, California
- Education: Harvard University (Ph.D)
- Scientific career
- Workplaces: City University of New York

John George Stoessinger (October 14, 1927 - November 20, 2017), was an American author who wrote ten leading books on world politics, including The Might of Nations, which received the distinguished Bancroft Prize for History. Stoessinger was also the Acting Director for the Political Affairs Division at the United Nations.

== Life and career ==
On the eve of World War II, Stoessinger fled from Nazi Austria to Czechoslovakia. His family was saved by a Japanese diplomat, Chiune Sugihara, who issued three visas to transit Russia, allowing them to escape to Shanghai via Siberia and Kobe. Stoessinger was a member of the Council on Foreign Relations, lecturing extensively throughout the world, and served as Distinguished Professor of Global Diplomacy at the University of San Diego.

Stoessinger's work is notable for his individualistic analyses of war, contrasted with the systemic views more commonly studied by political scientists after the Second World War. An example of this is his work in Why Nations Go to War. In that book's first chapter, "The Iron Dice," Stoessinger offers an alternative explanation of the causes of World War I, one that includes human reactions and feelings.

Stoessinger was an officer of the International Refugee Organization in the Far East and later a professor at Hunter College, City University of New York. From 1967 to 1974, he was acting director of the Political Affairs Division of the United Nations.

In September 1976, Stoessinger pleaded guilty in U.S. federal court to concealing fraud totaling at least $260,000 committed by Anne Lament, a former lover who used letters of recommendation from him which she addressed to overseas banks and governments. Lament was convicted of fraud, and Stoessinger was convicted for failing to report it. In 1977, Judge Charles S. Haight Jr. sentenced the professor to probation and ordered him to spend an average of two hours a week for 18 months teaching inmates at the Metropolitan Correctional Center. He subsequently received a full presidential pardon from President Ronald Reagan.

Stoessinger died in 2017 in California. He is survived by his ex-wife Caroline Stoessinger and his daughter Anna Stoessinger.

== Partial bibliography ==
- The Refugee and the World Community (University of Minnesota Press, 1956)
- The Might of Nations: World Politics in Our Time (1962)
- Financing the United Nations System (1964)
- Power and Order: 6 Cases in World Politics (1964) (with Alan F. Westin)
- The United Nations and the Superpowers (1965)
- Nations in Darkness: China, Russia, and America (1971) (Note: The sixth and most recent edition (1994) was retitled Nations at Dawn: China, Russia, and America)
- Why Nations Go to War (1974, 11th ed. 2011)
- Henry Kissinger: The Anguish of Power (1976)
- Night Journey: A Story of Survival and Deliverance (Playboy Press, 1978)
- Crusaders and Pragmatists: Movers of Modern American Foreign Policy (1979)
- From Holocaust to Harvard : a story of escape, forgiveness, and freedom (2014)
