= Chiautla de Tapia =

Coordinates: 18°17′57″N 98°36′10″W

- Municipality and town
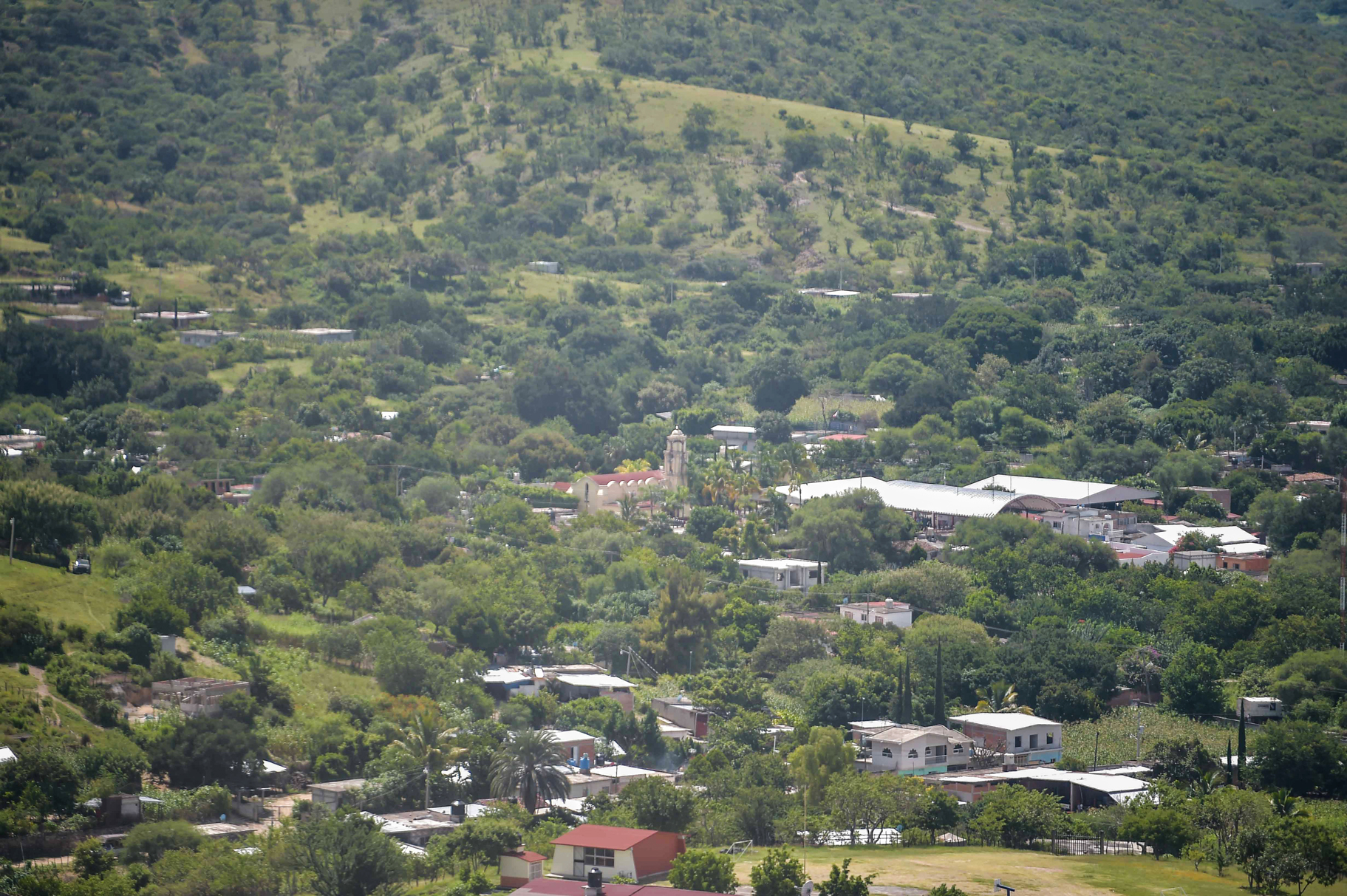

- Location of the municipality in Puebla
- Country: Mexico
- State: Puebla
- Time zone: UTC-6 (Zona Centro)

Chiautla de Tapia is a city and municipality in La Mixteca region of the Mexican state of Puebla. The municipality of Chiautla has a surface area of 685.05 km² which makes it the largest municipality in the state of Puebla. The BUAP has a Regional Section there.

== History ==
In the prehispanic era, Chiautla was the capital of an Aztec strategic province with multiple towns subject to it. Local products included cotton, copal and salt. This last was made from a salt lake designated for commercial purposes, and Chiautla provided salt to several towns in Morelos. The local language was Nahuatl.

== Notable people ==
- Gilberto Bosques Saldívar
