= Chiune Sugihara =

Japanese diplomat and humanitarian (1900–1986)

- 杉原 千畝
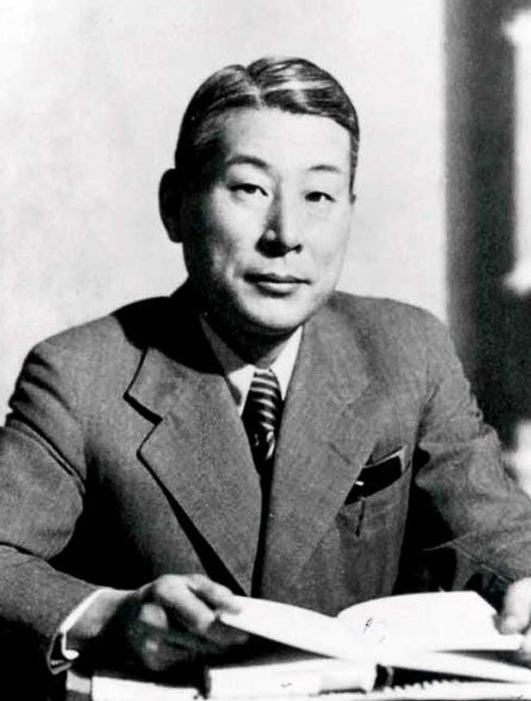
- Sugihara, before 1945
- Born: 1 January 1900; Kozuchi, Gifu, Japan
- Died: 31 July 1986 (aged 86); Kamakura, Kanagawa, Japan
- Resting place: Kamakura Cemetery
- Other names: "Sempo", Sergei Pavlovich Sugihara
- Occupation: Vice-consul for the Japanese Empire in Lithuania
- Known for: Rescue of thousands of Jews during the Holocaust
- Spouses: Klaudia Semionovna Apollonova (m. 1918; div. 1935); Yukiko Kikuchi (m. 1936)
- Children: 4
- Awards: Order of the Sacred Treasure, 5th Class (1944); Righteous Among the Nations (1984); Order of Merit of the Republic of Poland, 3rd Class (1996); Order of Polonia Restituta, 2nd Class (2007)

Chiune Sugihara (杉原 千畝, Sugihara Chiune; 1 January 1900 – 31 July 1986) was a Japanese diplomat who served as vice-consul for the Japanese Empire in Kaunas, Lithuania. During the Second World War, Sugihara helped thousands of Jews flee Europe by issuing transit visas to them so that they could travel through Japanese territory, risking his career and the lives of his family. The fleeing Jews were refugees from German-occupied Western Poland and Soviet-occupied Eastern Poland, as well as residents of Lithuania.

Lithuania declared the year 2020 as "The Year of Chiune Sugihara" in his honor. Today, the estimated number of descendants of those who received "Sugihara visas" ranges between 40,000 and 100,000.

In 2021, a street in Jerusalem was dedicated in his honor. There is street "Sempo Sugihara" in Tel Aviv as well.

== Early life and education ==
Chiune Sugihara was born on 1 January 1900 (Meiji 33), in Mino, Gifu prefecture, to a middle-class father, Yoshimi Sugihara (杉原好水, Sugihara Yoshimi), and an upper-middle class mother, Yatsu Sugihara (杉原やつ, Sugihara Yatsu). When he was born, his father worked at a tax office in Kozuchi-town and his family lived in a borrowed temple, with the Buddhist temple Kyōsen-ji (教泉寺) where he was born nearby. He was the second son among five boys and one girl. His father and family moved into the tax office within the branch of the Nagoya Tax Administration Office one after another.

In 1903 his family moved to Asahi Village in Niu-gun, Fukui Prefecture. In 1904 they moved to Yokkaichi, Mie Prefecture. On 25 October 1905, they moved to Nakatsu Town, Ena-gun, Gifu Prefecture. In 1906 (Meiji 39) on 2 April, Chiune entered Nakatsu Town Municipal Elementary School (now Nakatsugawa City Minami Elementary School in Gifu Prefecture). On 31 March 1907, he transferred to Kuwana Municipal Kuwana Elementary School in Mie Prefecture (currently Kuwana Municipal Nissin Elementary School). In December of that same year, he transferred to Nagoya Municipal Furuwatari Elementary School (now Nagoya Municipal Heiwa Elementary School). In 1912, he graduated with top honors from Furuwatari Elementary School and entered Aichi prefectural 5th secondary school (now Zuiryo high school), a combined junior and senior high school. His father wanted him to become a physician, but Chiune deliberately failed the entrance exam by writing only his name on the exam papers. Instead, he entered Waseda University in 1918 and majored in English language. At that time, he entered Yuai Gakusha, the Christian fraternity that had been founded by Baptist pastor Harry Baxter Benninghoff, to improve his English.

In 1919, he passed the Foreign Ministry Scholarship exam. From 1920 to 1922, Sugihara served in the Imperial Japanese Army as a second lieutenant with the 79th Infantry Regiment, stationed in Korea, then part of the Empire of Japan. He resigned his commission in November 1922 and took the Foreign Ministry's language qualifying exams the following year, passing the Russian exam with distinction. The Japanese Foreign Ministry recruited him and assigned him to Harbin, Manchuria, China, where he also studied the Russian and German languages and later became an expert on Russian affairs.

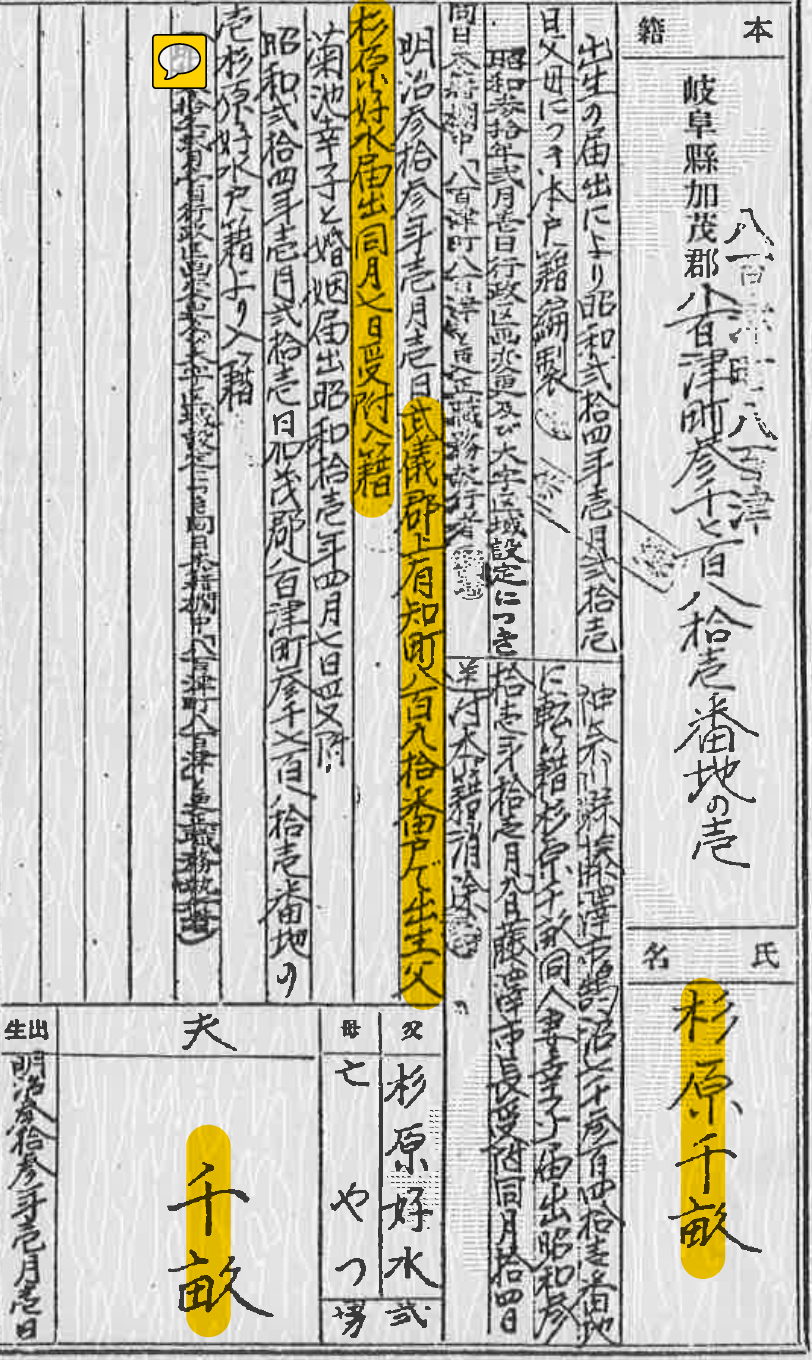
Chiune Sugihara's birth registry, indicating his birthplace as Kozuchi Town, Mugi District, nowadays known as Mino City in Gifu Prefecture

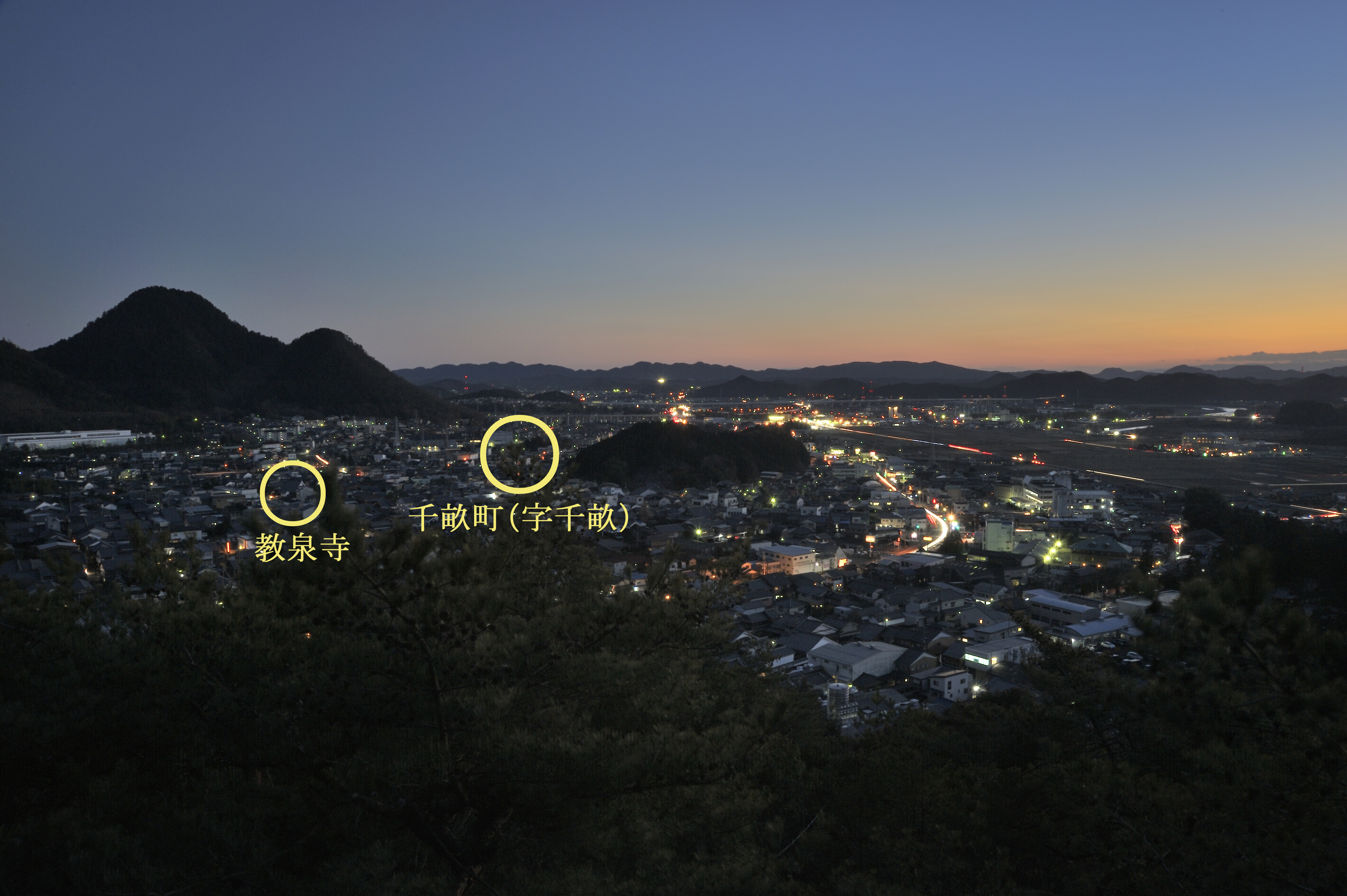
View of Kozuchi-town from Mt. Ogura. Kyosenji Temple where Chiune Sugihara was born and village section Named "Chiune" which can be seen from the temple.

Kyōsen-ji Temple (教泉寺). This temple was located at the address reported as the birthplace of Sugihara Chiune, and there was a Kōzuchi tax office that Chiune father served in the immediate area.

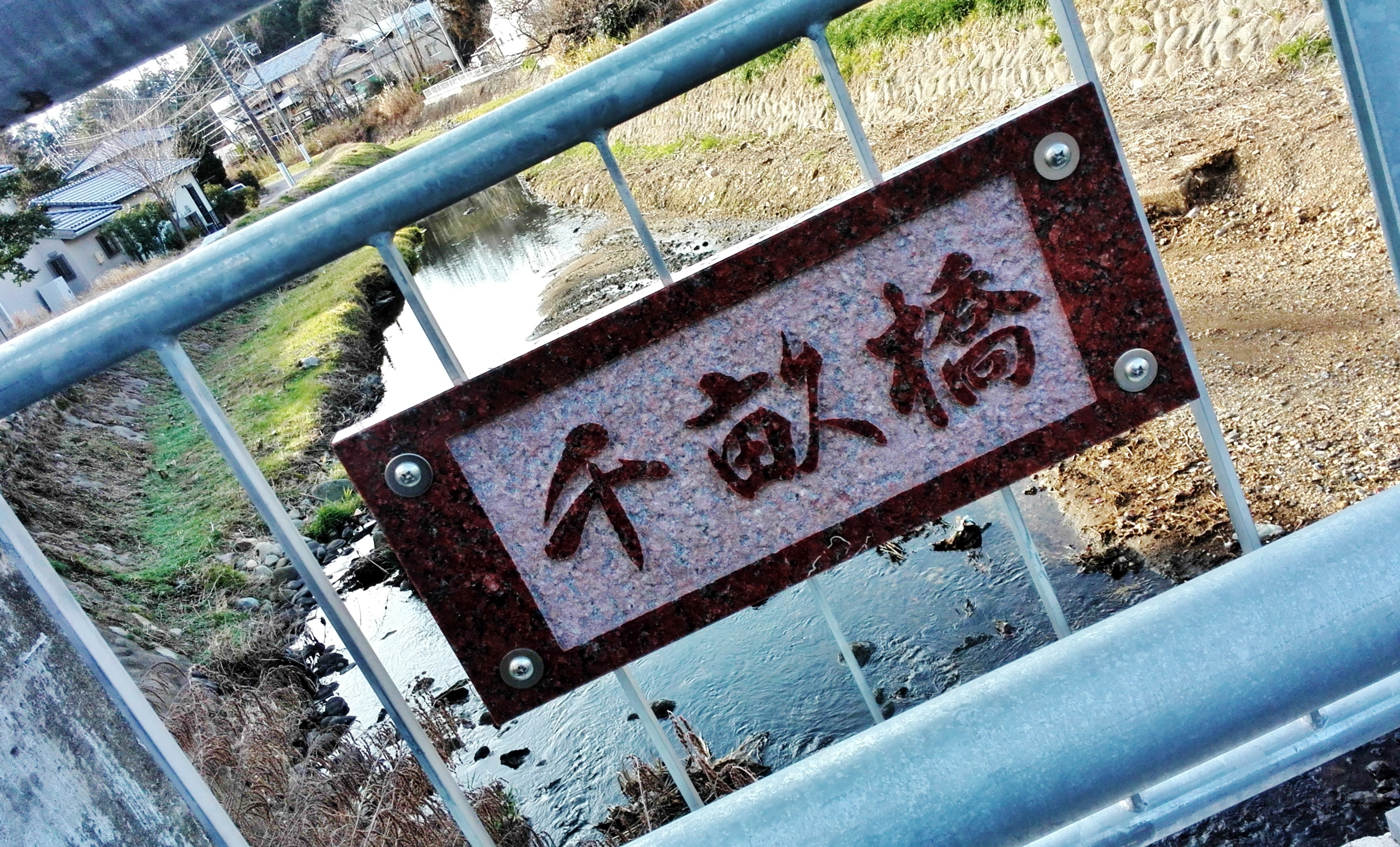
Chiune Bridge. A bridge over Chiune-cho which was the origin of the name of Chiune.

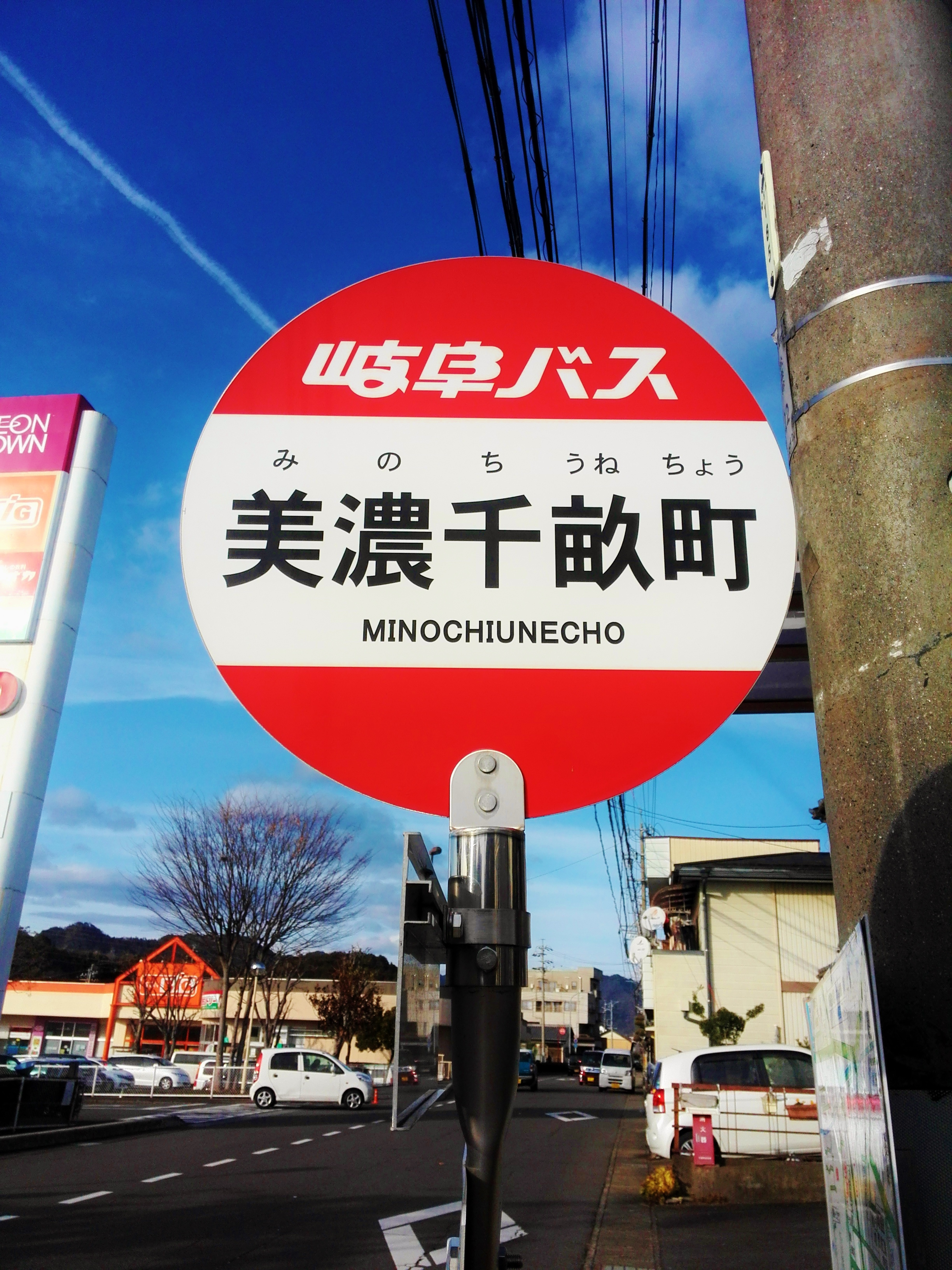
Bus stop of Chiune-cho where the name of Sugihara Chiune was derived

== Manchurian Foreign Office ==
When Sugihara served in the Manchukuo (Manchurian) Foreign Office, he took part in the negotiations with the Soviet Union concerning the Northern Manchurian Railway. Sugihara was said to be the best Russian-speaker in the Japanese government, according to Australian translator Roger Pulvers, and negotiated an agreement favourable to Japan with the Soviet Union which allowed Japan's Northern Manchurian Railway's expansion.

During his time in Harbin, Sugihara married Klaudia Semionovna Apollonova and converted to Christianity (Russian Orthodox Church), using the baptismal name Sergei Pavlovich.

In 1934, Sugihara quit his post as Deputy Foreign Minister in Manchukuo in protest over Japanese mistreatment of the local Chinese.

Sugihara and his wife divorced in 1935, before he returned to Japan, where he married Yukiko Kikuchi (1913–2008). They had four sons – Hiroki, Chiaki, Haruki, and Nobuki. As of 2025, Nobuki is the only surviving son and represents the Sugihara family at numerous ceremonies worldwide.

Chiune Sugihara also served in the Information Department of the Ministry of Foreign Affairs and as a translator for the Japanese delegation in Helsinki, Finland.

== Lithuania ==
Former Japanese consulate in Kaunas

In 1939, Sugihara became a vice-consul of the Japanese Consulate in Kaunas, the temporary capital of Lithuania. His duties included reporting on Soviet and German troop movements, and to find out if Germany planned an attack on the Soviets and, if so, to report the details of this attack to his superiors in Berlin and Tokyo.

Sugihara had cooperated with Polish intelligence as part of a bigger Japanese–Polish cooperative plan.

In Lithuania, Sugihara started using the Sino-Japanese reading "Sempo" for his given name, since it was easier to pronounce than "Chiune".

=== Jewish refugees ===
As the Soviet Union occupied sovereign Lithuania in 1940, many Polish and Lithuanian Jews fearing persecution tried to acquire exit visas. In June 1940, as Italy entered the war, exit routes via the Mediterranean Sea were closed. The Committee in Greater Germany, forced to seek new outlets for emigration, arranged for the transportation of Jews from Germany across Europe and Asia (via the Trans-Siberian Railway) to Vladivostok, and then to Japan. From Japan the refugees were to embark for destinations in the Western Hemisphere.

Although the Soviet Union began offering citizenship to those living in occupied Lithuania, some instead still wished to emigrate—principally rabbis, yeshiva students, members of the intellectual classes and leaders of various Jewish communal and labor organizations. Travel visas to Japan were initially granted without much difficulty, and the JDC, in collaboration with a number of other American Jewish groups, contributed toward the funds required for the Trans-Siberian trip to Japan of 1,700 persons.

In July 1940, Jewish refugees from Germany, Poland, Lithuania, and other countries began arriving in Japan at Tsuruga, Shimonoseki and Kobe. Japanese embassies and consulates except Kaunas issued 3,448 Japanese transit visas from January 1940 to March 1941. Nearly half of the recipients held valid end-visas and immediately departed Japan.

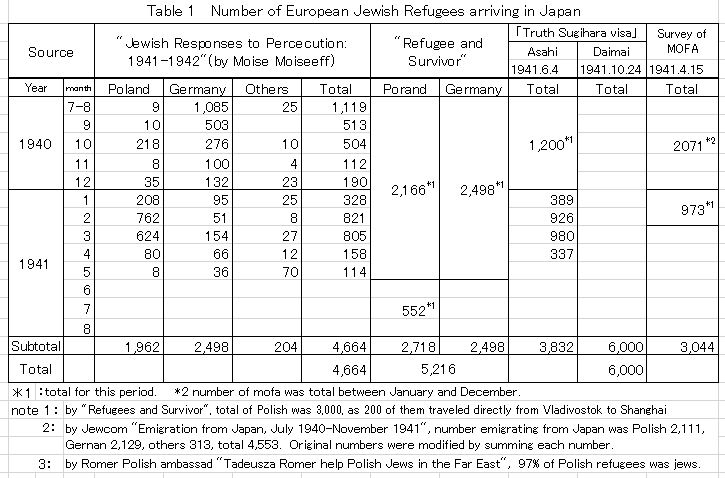
Table 1: Number of European Jews arriving in Japan

The number of Jewish refugees who came to Japan, as seen in Table 1, has been documented as 4,500, 5,000 or 6,000. The 552 persons noted in the second row of the table do not match the number of departing persons edited by Jewcom. The Siberian railway had been closed and no evidence supporting this figure is found in JDC annual reports or MOFA documents. For the 200 persons described in Note 1 of Table 1, there is a document in the Archives of MOFA that the Japanese consulate of Vladivostok transferred about 50 Jewish refugees who had been stranded in Vladivostok to Shanghai with Soviet Union cargo on 26 April 1941.

==== Sugihara's Visas ====
At the time, the Japanese government required that Japanese transit visas be issued only to those who had gone through appropriate immigration procedures, had enough funds and an onward final destination. Most of the refugees did not fulfill these criteria. Sugihara dutifully contacted the Japanese Foreign Ministry three times for instructions. Each time, the Ministry responded that anybody granted a visa should be in possession of a destination visa to an onward country beyond Japan, without exception.

Being aware that applicants were in danger if they stayed behind, Sugihara decided to ignore his orders and, from July 18 to August 28, 1940, he issued over 2100 transit visas. Given his inferior post and the culture of the Japanese Foreign Service bureaucracy, this was an unusual act of disobedience. He spoke to Soviet officials who agreed to let the Jews travel through the country via the Trans-Siberian Railway. His wife Yukiko who supported and encouraged him later recalled, "My husband and I talked about the visas before he issued them. We understood that both the Japanese and German governments disagreed with our ideas, but we went ahead anyhow."

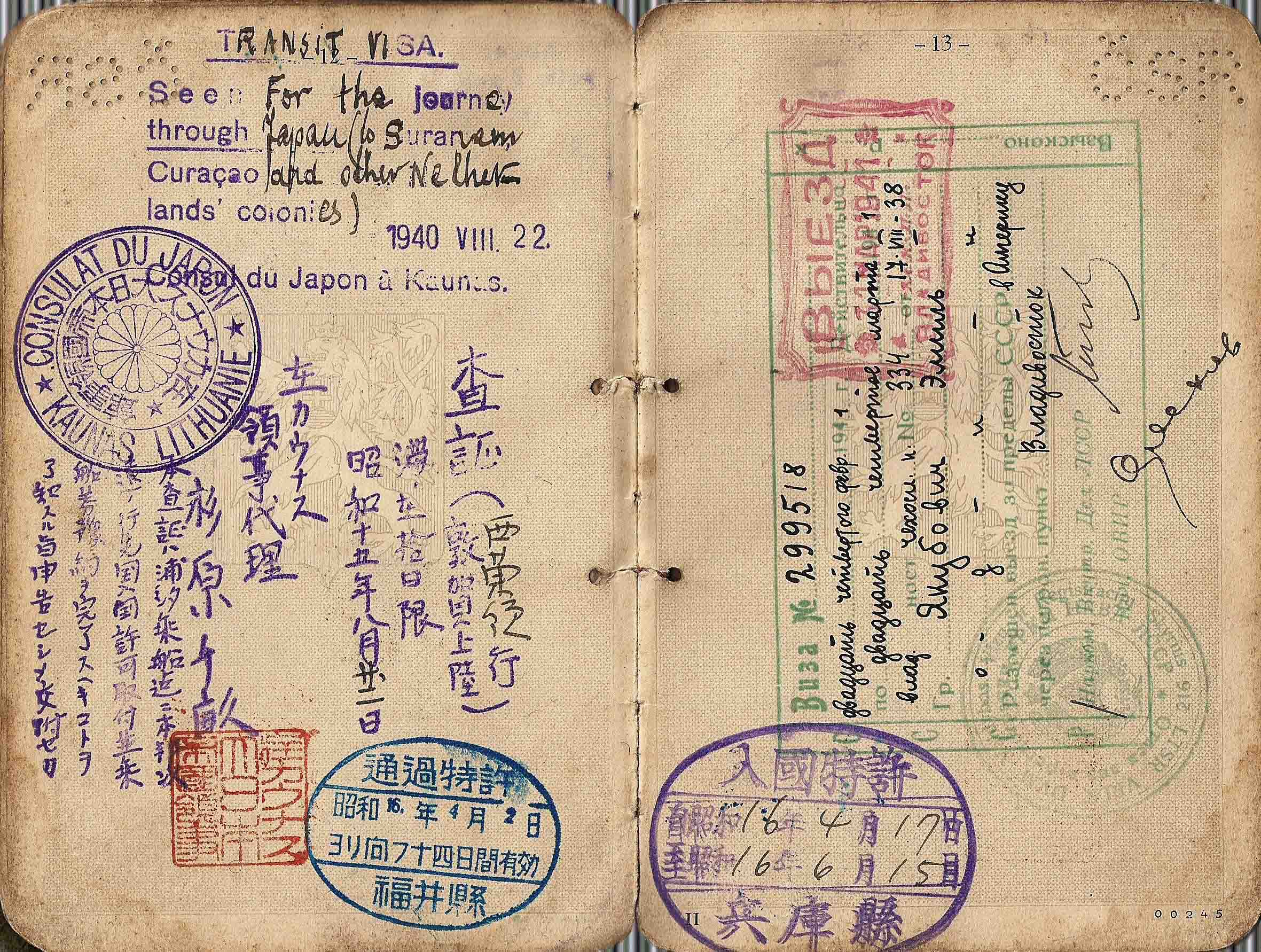
Czechoslovak passport with a Japanese transit visa issued in Kaunas, Lithuania on August 22, 1940, by Chiune Sugihara

Sugihara continued to hand-write visas, reportedly spending 18 to 20 hours a day on them, producing a normal month's worth of visas each day, until September 4, 1940, when he had to leave his post before the consulate was closed. Sugihara reportedly worked at a quick pace and aimed to issue 200 to 300 visas each day. By the end of his time at Kaunas, he had granted thousands of visas to Jews, many of whom were heads of households and thus permitted to take their families with them. Some sources say that before he left, he handed the official consulate stamp to a refugee so that more visas could be forged. His son, Nobuki Sugihara, adamantly insisted in an interview with Ann Curry that his father never gave the stamp to anyone. According to witnesses, he was still writing visas while in transit from his hotel and after boarding the train at Kaunas railway station, throwing visas into the crowd of desperate refugees out of the train's window even as the train pulled out. His son Hiroki noted, "my father continued to pen visas even at the railway station, throwing the last stamped passports out of the window of our train".

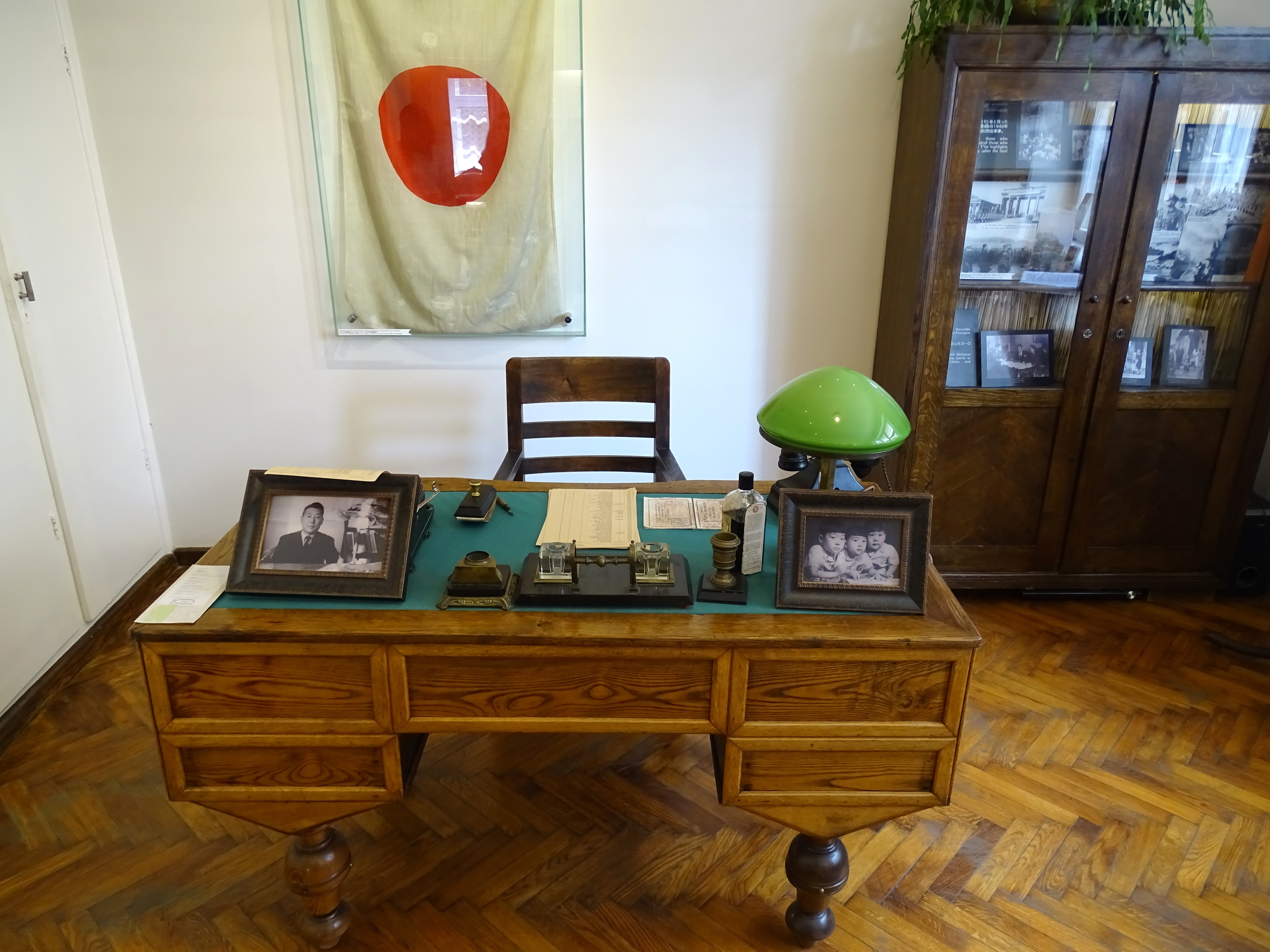
Consular office with original consular flag in Kaunas

In final desperation, blank sheets of paper with only the consulate seal and his signature (that could be later written over into a visa) were hurriedly prepared and flung out from the train. As he prepared to depart, he said, "Please forgive me. I cannot write anymore. I wish you the best." When he bowed deeply to the people before him, someone exclaimed, "Sugihara. We'll never forget you. I'll surely see you again!"

Sugihara himself wondered about official reaction to the thousands of visas he issued. Many years later, he recalled, "No one ever said anything about it. I remember thinking that they probably didn't realize how many I actually issued."

Lucille Szepsenwol Camhi, who was a teenager when she and her sister escaped from Poland to Lithuania stated in a 1999 oral interview with the United States Holocaust Memorial Museum that:

People tried to get out, to go somewhere, but there was no particular place you could go because either it was under the Russians or under the Germans, and the war was in between.

In the summer of 1940, Camhi and her sister stood outside the Japanese consulate in Lithuania in long lines on multiple occasions days apart in hopes of making it inside. When they finally pushed their way up the crowded staircase, the sisters pleaded with Sugihara, telling him that their mother had no papers and their father was dead. "He looked very sympathetic[ally] at us, and he just stamped, gave us the visa right there on the spot," Camhi recalled in 1999. "My sister and I got hysterical, started to cry, and started to say, 'Thank you, thank you,' in Polish. And he just raised his hand, like saying, 'It's OK.' And that's it, and we went out of the room."

Estimates of the number of people that Sugihara saved range as high as 10,000, of whom about 6000 were Jewish.

==== Where the Refugees Went ====
Many refugees used their visas to travel across the Soviet Union to Vladivostok and then by boat to Kobe, Japan, where there was a Jewish community. Romer, the Polish ambassador in Tokyo, organized help for them. From August 1940 to November 1941, he had managed to get transit visas in Japan, asylum visas to Canada, Australia, New Zealand, and Burma, immigration certificates to British Mandatory Palestine, and immigrant visas to the United States and some Latin American countries for more than two thousand Polish-Lithuanian Jewish refugees, who arrived in Kobe, Japan, and the Shanghai Ghetto, China.

The remaining number of Sugihara survivors stayed in Japan until they were deported to Japanese-occupied Shanghai, where there was already a large Jewish community that had existed as early as the mid-1930s. Some took the route through Korea directly to Shanghai without passing through Japan. A group of thirty people, all possessing a visa of "Jakub Goldberg", were shuttled back and forth on the open sea for several weeks before finally being allowed to pass through Tsuruga. Most of the around 20,000 Jews survived the Holocaust in the Shanghai ghetto until the Japanese surrender in 1945, three to four months following the collapse of the Third Reich itself.

== Imprisonment and release ==
Sugihara was reassigned to Königsberg, East Prussia before serving as a Consul General in Prague, in the German-occupied Protectorate of Bohemia and Moravia, from March 1941 to late 1942 and in the legation in Bucharest, Romania from 1942 to 1944. He was promoted to the rank of third secretary in 1943, and was decorated with the Order of the Sacred Treasure, 5th Class, in 1944. When Soviet troops entered Romania, they imprisoned Sugihara and his family in a POW camp for eighteen months. They were released in 1946 and returned to Japan through the Soviet Union via the Trans-Siberian Railway and Nakhodka port. In 1947, the Japanese foreign office asked him to resign, due to downsizing. Some sources, including his wife Yukiko Sugihara, have said that the Foreign Ministry told Sugihara he was dismissed because of "that incident" in Lithuania.

== Later life ==
Sugihara settled in Fujisawa in Kanagawa Prefecture with his wife and three sons. To support his family he took a series of menial jobs, at one point selling light bulbs door to door. He suffered a personal tragedy in 1947 when his youngest son, Haruki, died at the age of seven, shortly after their return to Japan. In 1949 they had one more son, Nobuki, who is the last son alive representing the Sugihara family, residing in Belgium. Chiune Sugihara later began to work for an export company as general manager of a US Military Post Exchange. Utilizing his command of the Russian language, Sugihara went on to work as a trade representative and live a low-key existence in the Soviet Union for sixteen years, while his family stayed in Japan.

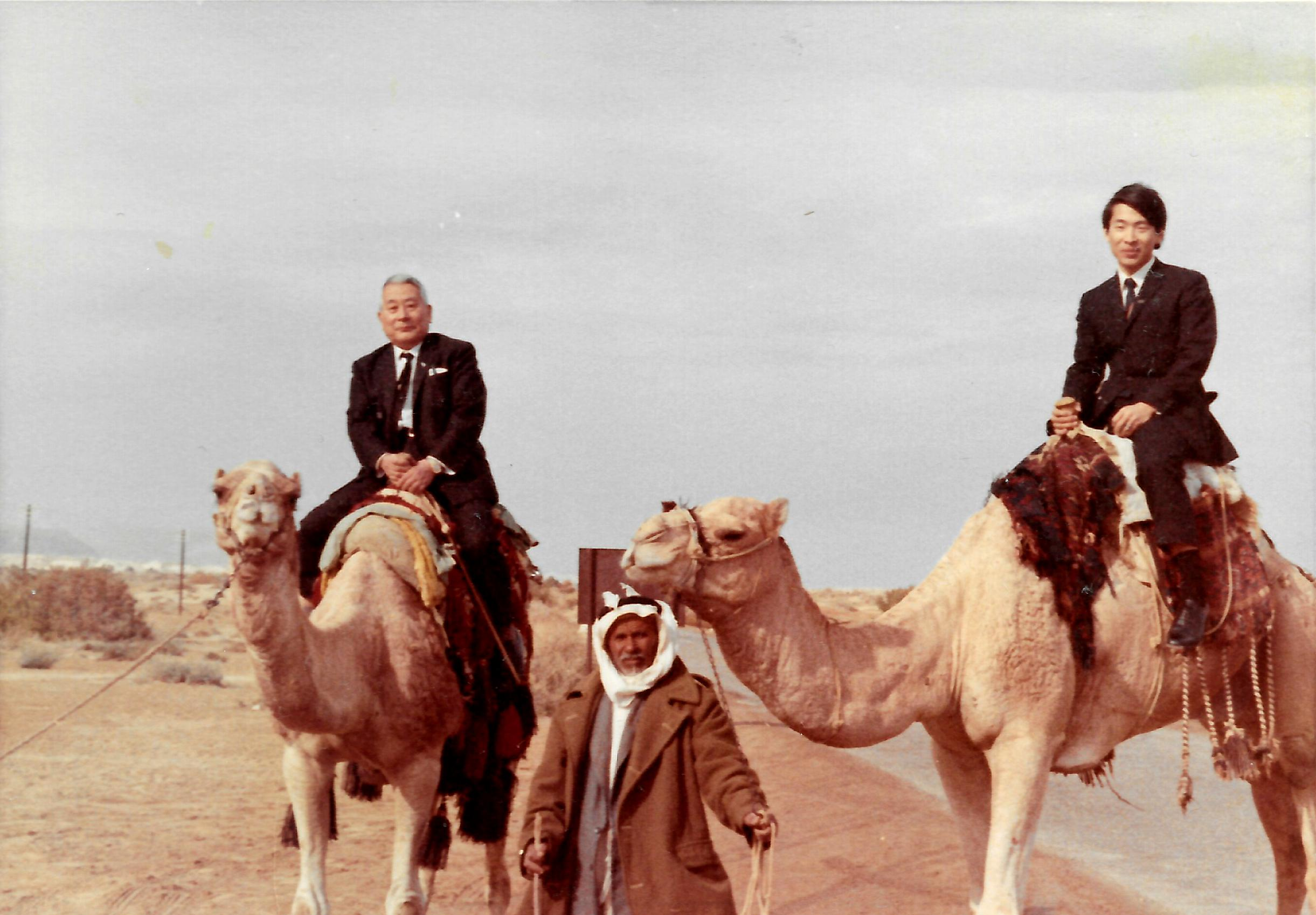
Chiune Sugihara and his son Nobuki in Israel, December 1969

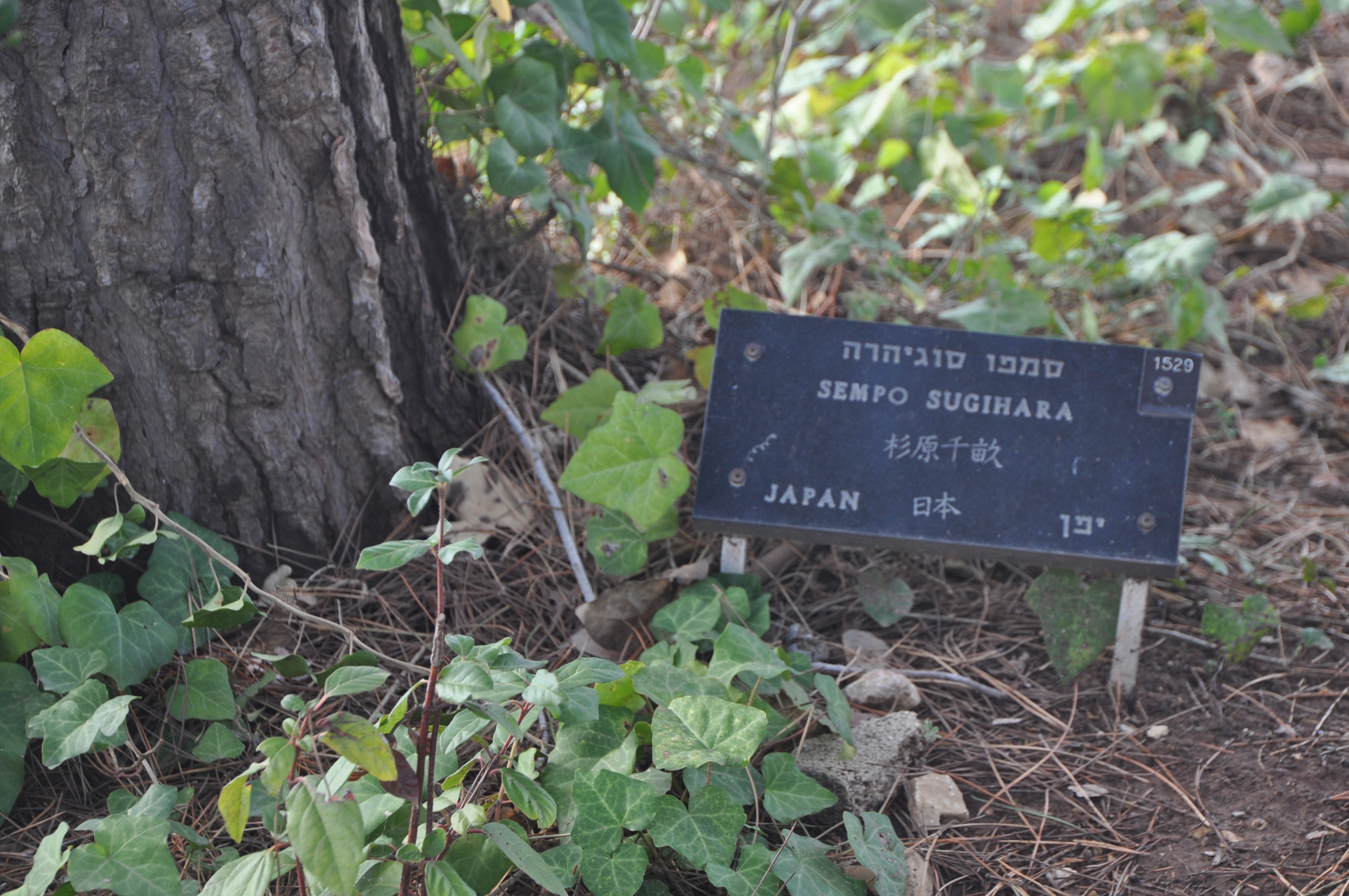
Plaque in front of Chiune Sugihara's tree on the Avenue of the Righteous at Yad Vashem in Jerusalem

In 1968, Yehoshua Nishri, an economic attaché to the Israeli Embassy in Tokyo and one of the Sugihara beneficiaries, finally located and contacted him. The next year Sugihara visited Israel and was greeted by the Israeli government. Sugihara beneficiaries began to lobby for his recognition by Yad Vashem. Sugihara was too ill to travel to Israel, so his wife and youngest son Nobuki accepted the honor on his behalf.

In 1985, 45 years after the Soviet invasion of Lithuania, he was asked his reasons for issuing visas to the Jews. Sugihara explained that the refugees were human beings, and that they simply needed help.

You want to know about my motivation, don't you? Well. It is the kind of sentiments anyone would have when he actually sees refugees face to face, begging with tears in their eyes. He just cannot help but sympathize with them. Among the refugees were the elderly and women. They were so desperate that they went so far as to kiss my shoes. Yes, I actually witnessed such scenes with my own eyes. Also, I felt at that time, that the Japanese government did not have any uniform opinion in Tokyo. Some Japanese military leaders were just scared because of the pressure from the Nazis; while other officials in the Home Ministry were simply ambivalent. People in Tokyo were not united. I felt it silly to deal with them. So, I made up my mind not to wait for their reply. I knew that somebody would surely complain about me in the future. But, I myself thought this would be the right thing to do. There is nothing wrong in saving many people's lives... The spirit of humanity, philanthropy... neighborly friendship... with this spirit, I ventured to do what I did, confronting this most difficult situation – and because of this reason, I went ahead with redoubled courage.

When asked by Moshe Zupnik, who received one of the visas from Sugihara in 1940, why he risked his career to save other people, he said simply: "I do it just because I have pity on the people. They want to get out so I let them have the visas."

Chiune Sugihara died at a hospital in Kamakura, on 31 July 1986, and was buried in Kamakura Cemetery (Kamakura Reien). Despite the publicity given him in Israel and other nations, he had remained virtually unknown in his home country. Only when a large Jewish delegation from around the world, including the Israeli ambassador to Japan, attended his funeral, did his neighbours find out what he had done. His subsequent considerable posthumous acclaim contrasts with the obscurity in which he lived following the loss of his diplomatic career.

== Honor restored ==
His death spotlighted his humanitarian acts during World War II and created the opportunity to revise his reputation as a diplomat in his own country. In 1991 Muneo Suzuki, Parliamentary Vice-president of Foreign Affairs, apologized to Chiune's family for the long-time unfair treatment by the Ministry of Foreign Affairs. Official honor restoration by Japanese Government was made on 10 October 2000, when Foreign Minister Yōhei Kōno set the award plaque and gave a commendation speech at the ceremony for Sugihara at the Diplomatic Archives of the Ministry of Foreign Affairs of Japan.

== Family ==
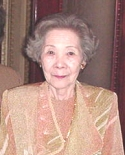
Yukiko Sugihara in 2000

- Yukiko Sugihara (née Kikuchi) (1913–2008) – wife. Poet and author of Visas for 6,000 Lives. She was the eldest daughter of a high school principal in Kagawa Prefecture, and the granddaughter of a Buddhist priest in Iwate Prefecture. She was also well versed in German, and a member of Kanagawa Prefecture Poetry Committee and Selection Committee for Asahi Shimbun's Kadan poetry section. She was the author of Poetry Anthology: White Nights and other works. She also converted to Russian Orthodoxy upon her marriage to Sugihara. Died on 8 October 2008.
- Hiroki Sugihara (1936–2002) – eldest son. Studied in California upon graduating from Shonan High School in Kanagawa Prefecture in Japan. Translated his mother's book Visas for Life into English.
- Chiaki Sugihara (1938–2010) – second son. Born in Helsinki. Studied in California.
- Haruki Sugihara (1940–12 November 1947) – third son. He was born in Kaunas. Died in Japan aged between six and seven of leukemia.
- Nobuki Sugihara (1948–) – fourth son. Attended Hebrew University in Israel in 1968 at the invitation of the Israeli Foreign Ministry and the Jewish Fund. Represents the Sugihara family as the only surviving son of Chiune. Since his attendance at the award ceremony of the Sugihara Righteous Forest in the outskirt of Jerusalem on behalf of Chiune in 1985, Nobuki has been actively attending Chiune-related events around the world as the family's spokesperson. Nobuki also heads NPO Sugihara, registered in Belgium, in order to promote peace in the Middle East.
- Grandchildren: Chiune Sugihara had 9 grandchildren (8 still alive) and 10 great-grandchildren. Among his grandchildren, those most active in promoting his legacy are Chihiro Sugihara and Madoka Sugihara, both children of Hiroki Sugihara.

== Legacy and honors ==
In 1984, Yad Vashem bestowed the Righteous Among the Nations title on Chiune Sugihara, the only Japanese national to have been so honored. He was too ill to travel to receive the award at the Israeli embassy in Tokyo, so his wife and one or more of his children accepted the honor on his behalf.

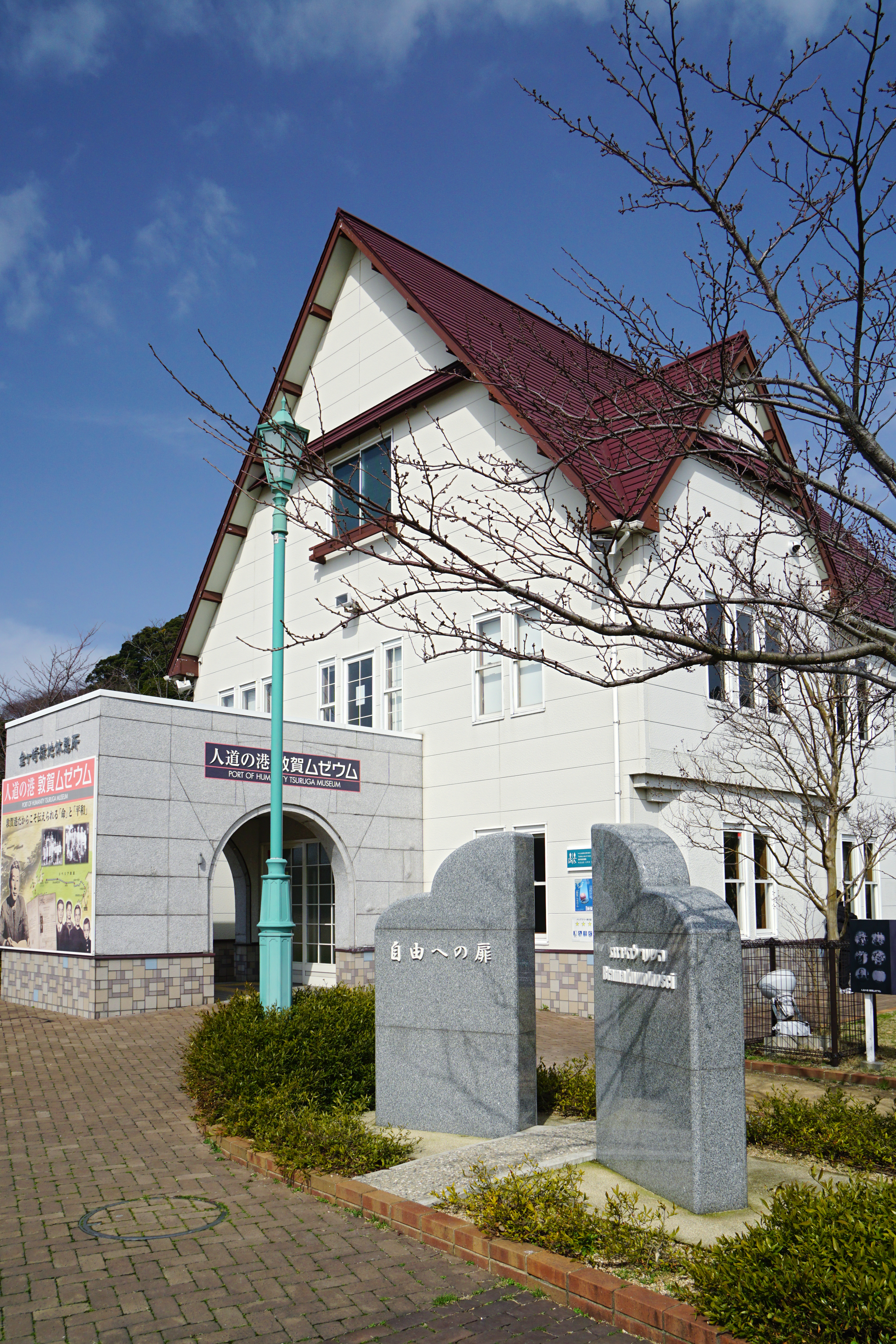
The Port of Humanity Tsuruga Museum in Tsuruga, Fukui, Japan, contains a Sugihara Chiune corner.

Sugihara Street in Vilnius, Lithuania, Chiune (Sempo) Sugihara Street in Jaffa, Israel, and the asteroid 25893 Sugihara are named after him.

In 1992, the town of Yaotsu opened the Park of Humanity, on a hill overlooking the town. In 2000, the Chiune Sugihara Memorial Hall was opened to the public. Since its establishment, more than 600,000 visitors, Japanese and foreign, visited and studied about Sugihara and his virtue.

A corner for Sugihara Chiune is set up in the Port of Humanity Tsuruga Museum near Tsuruga Port, the place where many Jewish refugees arrived in Japan, in the city of Tsuruga, Fukui, Japan.

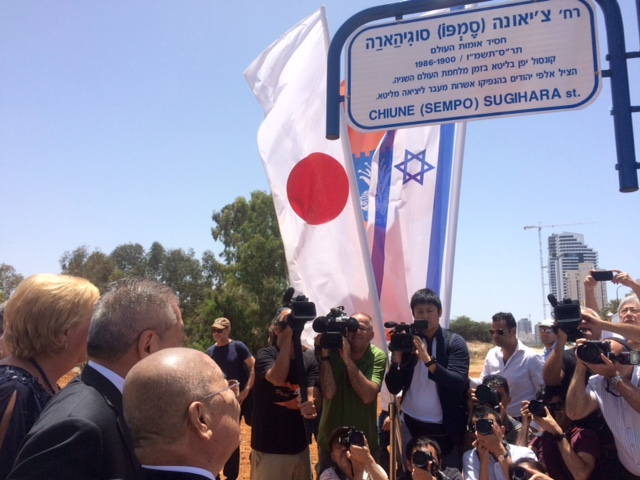
Sugihara Street, Netanya

The Sugihara House Museum is in Kaunas, Lithuania. The Conservative synagogue Temple Emeth, in Chestnut Hill, Massachusetts, US, built a "Sugihara Memorial Garden" and holds an Annual Sugihara Memorial Concert. In 1996, Albany, New York, erected a plaque honoring Sugihara in the city's Raoul Wallenberg Park.

When Sugihara's widow Yukiko travelled to Jerusalem in 1998, she was met by tearful survivors who showed her the yellowing visas that her husband had signed. A park in Jerusalem is named after him. Sugihara appeared on a 1998 Israeli postage stamp. The Japanese government honored him on the centennial of his birth in 2000.

In 2001, a sakura park with 200 trees was planted in Vilnius, Lithuania, to mark the 100th anniversary of Sugihara.

In 2002, a memorial statue of Chiune Sugihara by Ramon G. Velazco titled "Chiune Sugihara Memorial, Hero of the Holocaust" was installed in the Little Tokyo neighborhood of Los Angeles, California, US. The life-size bronze statue depicts Sugihara seated on a bench and holding a hand-written visa. Adjacent to the statue is a granite boulder with dedication plaques and a quotation from the Talmud: "He who saves one life, saves the entire world." Its dedication was attended by consuls from Japan, Israel and Lithuania, Los Angeles city officials and Sugihara's son, Chiaki Sugihara.

In 2007 he was posthumously awarded the Commander's Cross with the Star of the Order of Polonia Restituta, and the Commander's Cross Order of Merit of the Republic of Poland by the President of Poland in 1996. Also, in 1993, he was awarded the Life Saving Cross of Lithuania. He was posthumously awarded the Sakura Award by the Japanese Canadian Cultural Centre (JCCC) in Toronto in November 2014.

In June 2016, a street in Netanya, Israel, was named for Sugihara in the presence of his son Nobuki, as a number of Netanya's current residents are descendants of the Lithuanian Jews who had been given a means of escaping the Third Reich. There is also a street named Rua Cônsul Chiune Sugihara in Londrina, Brazil.

The Lithuanian government declared 2020 "The Year of Chiune Sugihara", promising to erect a monument to him and issue postage stamps in his honor. A monument to Sugihara, featuring origami cranes, was unveiled in Kaunas in October 2020.

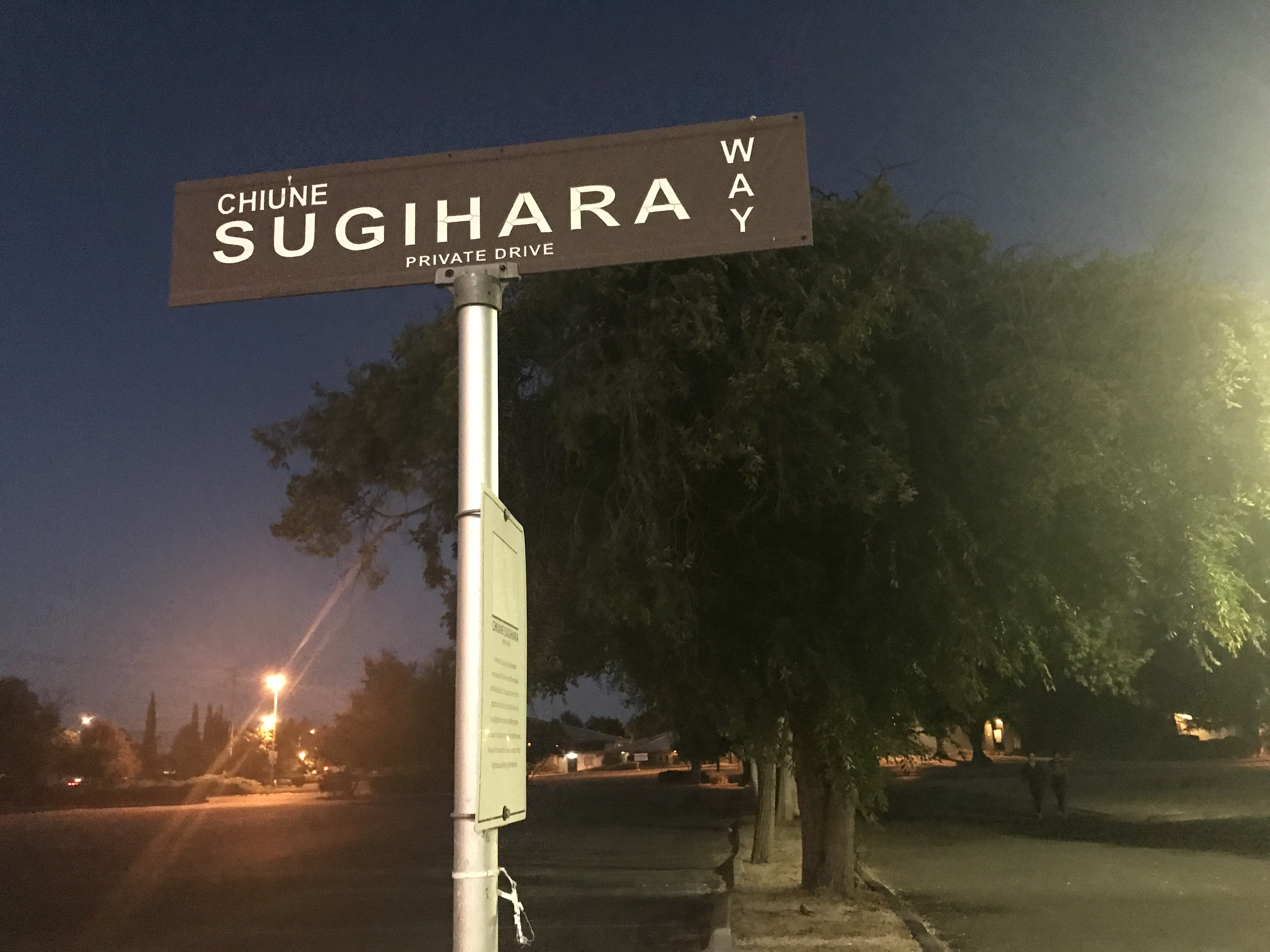
Sugihara Way in front of Congregation Beth David, Saratoga, California, US

Since October 2021, there is a Chiune Sugihara Square in Jerusalem as well as a Garden named for him in the Kiryat Hayovel neighborhood of the city.

== Biographies ==
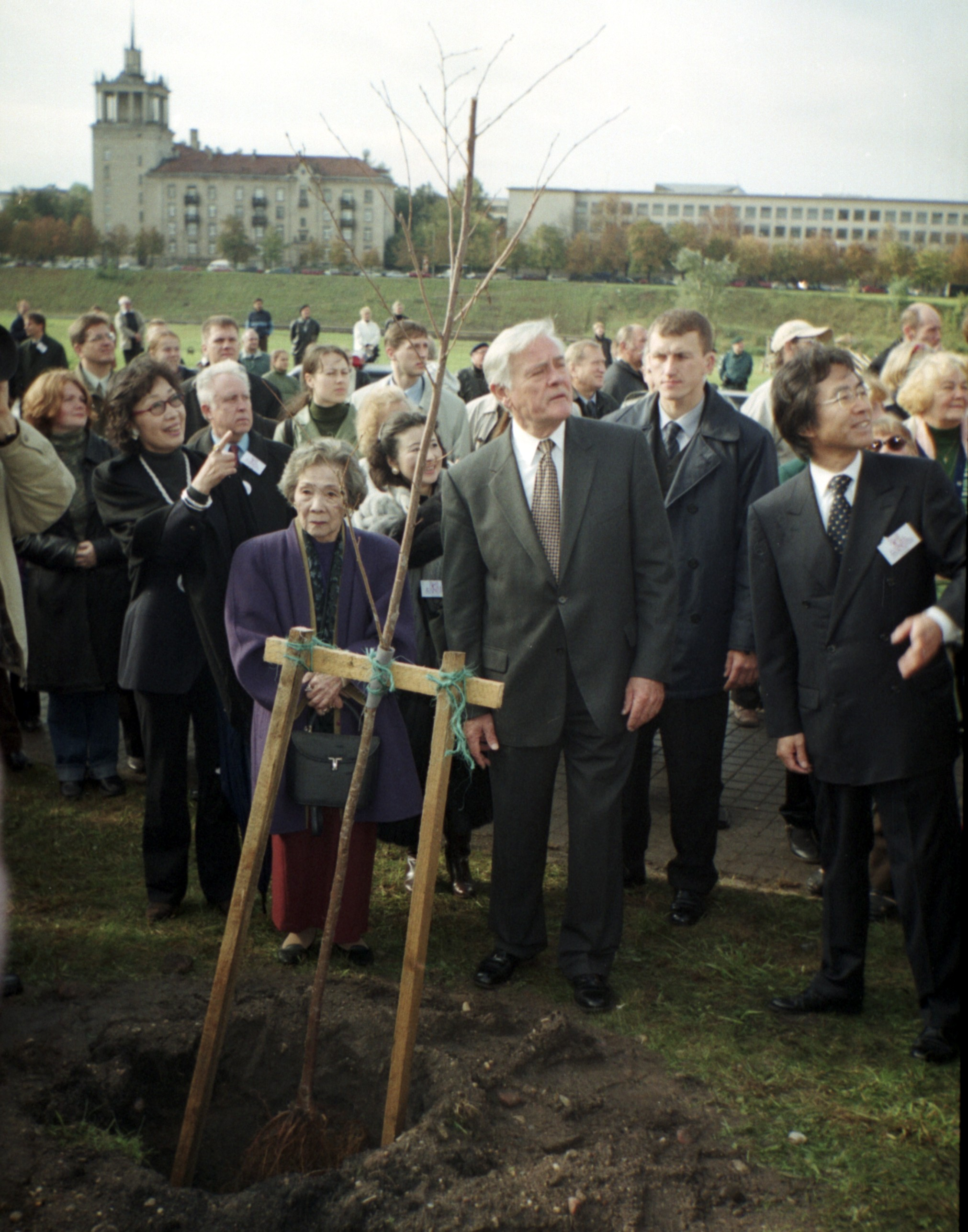
Sugihara's widow with Lithuania's president Valdas Adamkus at a tree planting ceremony in Vilnius, Lithuania, in 2001

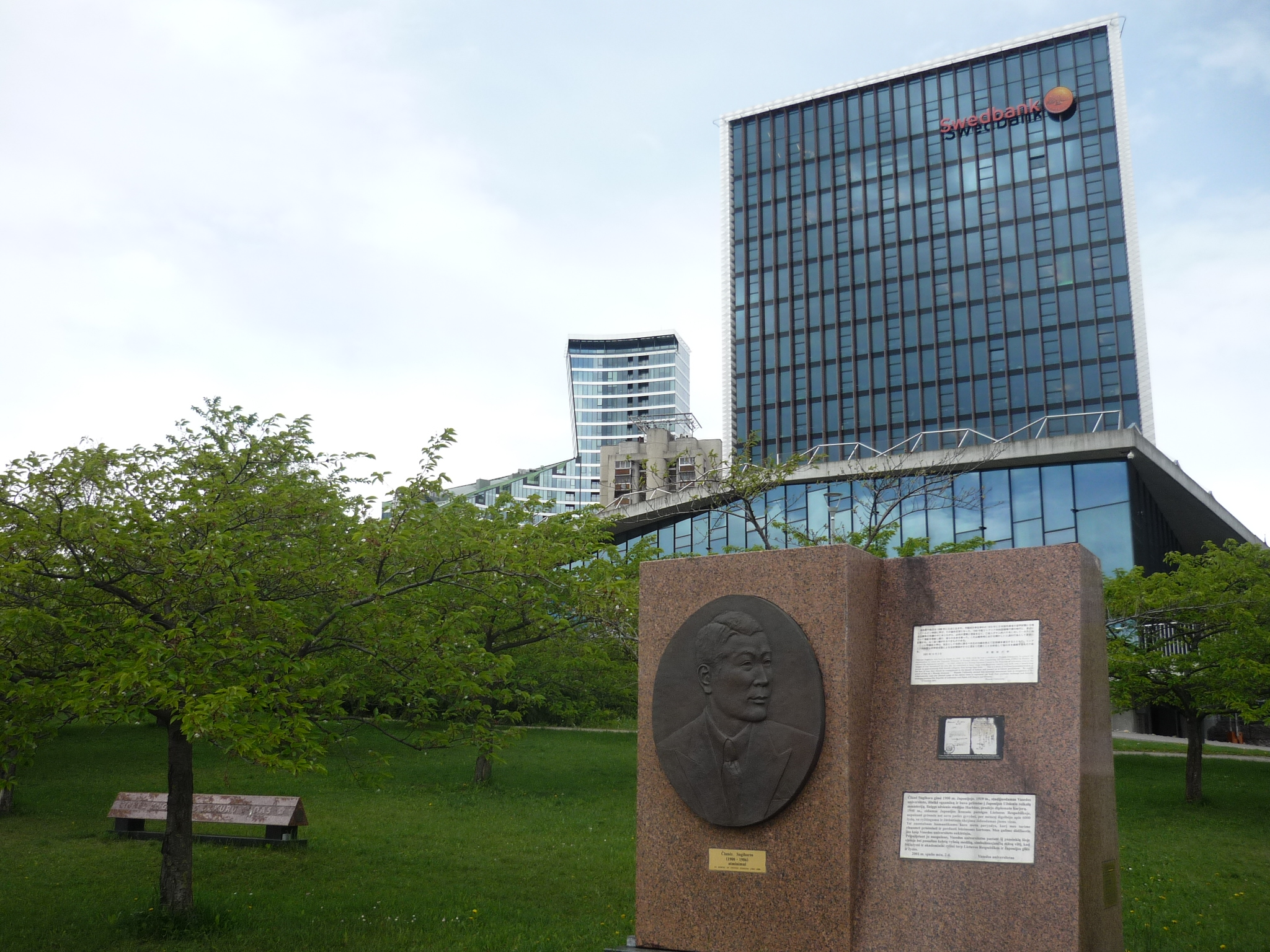
Memorial, Sugihara Park, Vilnius

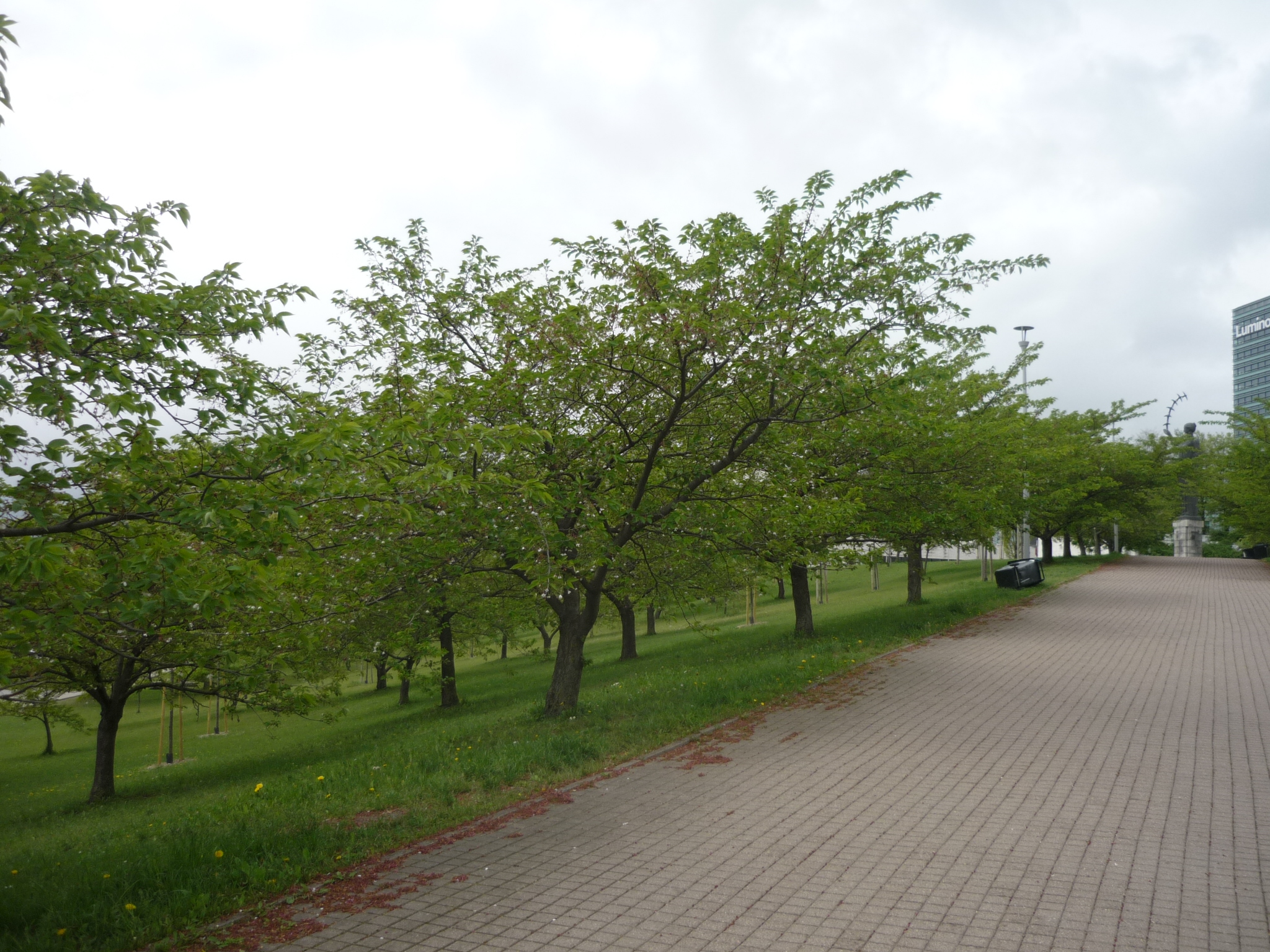
Sakura cherry trees, Sugihara Park, Vilnius

- Levine, Hillel (4 November 1996). In Search of Sugihara: The Elusive Japanese Diplomat Who Risked his Life to Rescue 10,000 Jews From the Holocaust. Free Press. ISBN 978-0684832517.
- Yukiko Sugihara, Visas for Life, translated by Hiroki Sugihara, San Francisco, Edu-Comm, 1995. ISBN 9780964899902
- Yukiko Sugihara, Visas pour 6000 vies, traduit par Karine Chesneau, Ed. Philippe Picquier, 1995.
- A Japanese TV station made a documentary film about Chiune Sugihara. This film was shot in Kaunas, at the place of the former embassy of Japan.
- Sugihara: Conspiracy of Kindness (2000) from PBS shares details of Sugihara and his family and the fascinating relationship between the Jews and the Japanese in the 1930s and 1940s.
- A Special Fate: Chiune Sugihara: Hero of the Holocaust (2000), by Alison Leslie Gold, is a book for young readers (grades 5–10). The book draws on interviews with Sugihara's wife and other witnesses and weaves in the stories of two Jewish refugee families. The epilogue describes how Sugihara was finally honored in his own country and in Israel.
- On 11 October 2005, Yomiuri TV (Osaka) aired a two-hour-long drama entitled Visas for Life about Sugihara, based on his wife's book.
- Chris Tashima and Chris Donahue made a film about Sugihara in 1997, Visas and Virtue, which won the Academy Award for Live Action Short Film.
- A 2002 children's picture book, Passage to Freedom: The Sugihara Story, by Ken Mochizuki and illustrated by Dom Lee, is written from the perspective of Sugihara's young sons and in the voice of Hiroki Sugihara (age 5, at the time). The book also includes an afterword written by Hiroki Sugihara.
- In 2015, Japanese fictional drama film Persona Non Grata (杉原千畝 スギハラチウネ) was produced; Toshiaki Karasawa played Sugihara.

== Notable Sugihara Visa Recipients ==
- Leaders and students of the Mir Yeshiva, Yeshivas Tomchei Temimim (formally of Lubavitch/Lyubavichi, Russia) relocated to Otwock, Poland and elsewhere.
- Yaakov Banai, (1920–2009) commander of the Lehi movement's combat unit and later an Israeli military commander
- Joseph R. Fiszman, professor emeritus of Political Science at the University of Oregon
- Robert Lewin, (1918–2004) a Polish art dealer and philanthropist
- Leo Melamed, financier, head of the Chicago Mercantile Exchange (CME), and pioneer of financial futures
- John G. Stoessinger, (1927–2017) professor of diplomacy at the University of San Diego
- Marcel Weyland, (1927–2025) translator
- Zerach Warhaftig, (1906–2002) an Israeli lawyer and politician, and a signatory of Israel's Declaration of Independence
- George Zames, (1934–1997) control theorist
- Bernard and Rochelle Zell, parents of business magnate Sam Zell

== See also ==
- Abdol Hossein Sardari
- Ángel Sanz Briz
- Aracy de Carvalho
- Aristides de Sousa Mendes
- Gilberto Bosques Saldívar
- Giorgio Perlasca
- Ho Feng-Shan
- Individuals and groups assisting Jews during the Holocaust
- Irena Sendler
- Jan Zwartendijk
- Jewish settlement in the Japanese Empire
- John Rabe
- Ładoś Group
- Luiz Martins de Souza Dantas
- Mir Yeshiva (Belarus)
- Nansen passport
- Nicholas Winton
- Oskar Schindler
- Persona Non Grata (2015 film)
- Raoul Wallenberg
- Setsuzo Kotsuji
- Tatsuo Osako
- Thomas Hildebrand Preston
- Varian Fry
