= Persona Non Grata (2015 film) =

- Poster

Japanese name
- Kanji: 杉原千畝 スギハラチウネ
- Directed by: Cellin Gluck
- Written by: Tetsuo Kamata; Hiromichi Matsuo
- Produced by: Nobuyuki Iinuma; Kazutoshi Wadakura
- Starring: Toshiaki Karasawa; Koyuki
- Cinematography: Garry Waller
- Edited by: Jim Munro
- Music by: Naoki Satō
- Production companies: Nippon TV; Toho; D.N. Dream Partners; Yomiuri Telecasting Corporation; Dentsu; Pony Canyon; Yomiuri Shimbun; Shogakukan; ShoPro; JTB Group; Chunichi Shimbun; BS Nippon; Cine Bazar; Sapporo Television Broadcasting; Miyagi Television Broadcasting; Shizuoka Daiichi Television; Chūkyō Television Broadcasting; Hiroshima Telecasting; Fukuoka Broadcasting Corporation; Fukui Broadcasting
- Distributed by: Toho
- Release dates: October 13, 2015 (World premiere, Kaunas, Lithuania); December 5, 2015 (Japan)
- Running time: 139 minutes
- Country: Japan
- Language: Japanese
- Box office: US$6.3 million

Persona Non Grata (杉原千畝 スギハラチウネ, Sugihara Chiune) is a 2015 Japanese biographical drama film directed by Cellin Gluck. It depicts the life of Japanese diplomat Chiune Sugihara who was appointed a vice-consul and later a consul in Lithuania and served there from 1939 to 1940 and who saved the lives of some 6,000 Jewish refugees by issuing transit visas to the Japanese Empire.

Even though most of the film is set in Interwar Lithuania, various places in Poland were chosen for filming. The Polish cargo ship SS Sołdek also appeared in the movie.

== Plot ==
In 1955, a Jewish man named Nyiszli comes to the Japan Ministry of Foreign Affairs, in search of Chiune "Senbo" Sugihara, a man who once saved his life. An officer named Ichiro Sekimitsu, who acommondates Nyiszli, replies that "There is no such diplomat called 'Senbo Sugihara'". Disappointed, Nyiszli leaves the Ministry after promising to find Sugihara.

Back to 1934, Sugihara, who was once a staff member at the Manchuria Ministry of Foreign Affairs, engages in espionage activity with Russian accomplices Irina and Maret, in order to gain the upper hand in the negotiations for the Chinese Eastern Railway rights between Manchuria and the Soviet Union. Although Sugihara's party successfully captures the Soviet army's evidence of stealing the locomotive, Kingo Minamikawa, a superior of Sugihara and one of the Kwantung Army, suddenly orders the killings of the Soviet soldiers and Maret. Enraged and disappointed over the actions of the Kwantung Army, Sugihara resigns from Manchurian Ministry and returns to Japan. Sugihara is then assigned to be the Japanese Ambassador to the Soviet Union and prepares to leave for Moscow, Russia.

To Sugihara's surprise, the Soviets have listed him as "Persona Non Grata" due to the incidents in Manchuria and rejected his position in Moscow. Disappointed, Sugihara goes drinking with his friend Shizuo Kikuchi, where he meets Shizuo's younger sister Sachiko. The two fall in love and get married.

In 1939, at the beginning of the World War II, Sugihara is assigned as a diplomat in Kaunas, Lithuania, and to spy on the moves of the Soviets. Soon after Sugihara's arrival, the Soviets and Nazi Germany form the Nazi–Soviet Pact, and the German army invades Poland. Sugihara soon begins intelligence activity with Pesh, a Polish spy who volunteers for the work. When they analyze the intel, they realize the Soviets and the Nazis plan to divide the whole of Eastern Europe, yet the Japanese do nothing despite Sugihara's reports.

In 1940, the Soviets occupy the Baltic countries. The Jewish people including Nyiszli, who escaped from Germany's Nazi regime, plan to escape Europe through Soviet lands, but encounter obstacles while the Soviets shut down the countries' consulates, where the Jews have to apply to get transit visas. They finally find Jan Zwartendijk, a businessman and acting consul of the Netherlands, who agrees to issue visas to them. Still, the Jews have to get visas issued by Japan because their escape route is via the Far East. Many Jews come to the Japanese consulate to request visas. However, as per orders from the Ministry, Sugihara is forbidden to issue visas to them. Later, Sugihara finally has a change of heart when he sees the doings of Zwartendijk and the miserable situation of the Jews, he issues as many visas as possible until his family leaves Lithuania. The Jews end up successfully escaping to Japan.

After leaving Lithuania, Sugihara is then assigned to Königsberg, East Prussia. Sugihara and Pesh discover the German army is preparing to invade the Soviet Union, and Sugihara immediately reports to Hiroshi Oshima, the Ambassador of Japan in Germany. But Sugihara's report is then dismissed by Oshima, who still has a fantasy about Hitler's regime. After the Nazis declare war on the Soviets, Sugihara is then ordered to leave the country immediately and assigned to Romania. Before departure, Sugihara leaves Oshima a warning that Japan will lose if they declare war on the United States. Sugihara then bids farewell to Pesh, who decides to go back to Poland to fight for his country.

In 1945, after the surrender of Japan, the Sugihara family are in a POW camp in the Soviet Union. Sugihara then receives some letters carrying the news of the surrender which comes from Irina. She thanks Sugihara who saved numerous Jewish lives and changed their fate with his decision to issue visas. Sugihara breaks down into tears after reading the letters.

27 years later, in 1972, Sugihara has resigned from the Ministry, and works at a merchandising company in Moscow. He finally reunites with Nyiszli, and they fondly remember their past lives. The end titles reveal Sugihara received the Righteous Among the Nations award from the State of Israel in 1985, in the recognition of his saving of Jewish lives. Sugihara dies of heart disease on July 31, 1987 at the age of 86. In 2000, the Japanese Ministry of Foreign Affairs restores Sugihara's honor and establishes a ceremonial plaque in his memory.

== Cast ==
- Toshiaki Karasawa – Chiune Sugihara
- Koyuki – Yukiko Sugihara (Chiune's wife)
- Borys Szyc – Pesh (ペシュ Pesshu)
- Agnieszka Grochowska – Irina (イリーナ Irīna)
- Fumiyo Kohinata – Ambassador Oshima
- Cezary Łukaszewicz – Wolfgang Gudze (グッジェ Gujje)
- Michał Żurawski – Nyiszli (ニシェリ Nisheri)
- Zbigniew Zamachowski – Avraham Goehner (ガノール社長 Ganōru-shachō)
- Andrzej Blumenfeld – Chaim Rosenthal
- Takashi Tsukamoto – Minamikawa (南川欽吾)
- Gaku Hamada - Tatsuo Osako (大迫辰雄 Ōsako Tetsuo)
- Wenanty Nosul – Jan Zwartendijk
- Ken'ichi Takito - Ichiro Sekimitsu (関満一朗 Sekimitsu Ichirō)
- Satoshi Nikaido - Saburo Nei (根井三郎 Nei Saburō)

== Production ==
- Cellin Gluck – Director

== Release ==
As a premiere in Poland, it was an opening film at the Warsaw Jewish Film Festival.

The North American premiere was part of the 2016 Atlanta Jewish Film Festival (AJFF) with five screenings, one each at five of the festival venues. The first screening was 31 January 2016 at SCADshow.

== Reception ==
The film grossed US$1.2 million on its opening weekend in Japan.
