= Baruch Tenembaum =

Argentine interfaith activist

- Born: July 9, 1933; Las Palmeras, Santa Fe, Argentina
- Died: December 7, 2025 (aged 92)
- Education: Higher Institute of Judaic Religious Studies
- Occupation: Interfaith activist
- Known for: Promoter of interfaith dialogue and International Raoul Wallenberg Foundation
- Children: 3

Baruch Tenembaum (9 July 1933 – 7 December 2025) was an Argentinian interfaith activist, and one of the founders of the International Raoul Wallenberg Foundation.

== Early life ==
Tenembaum was born in Argentina at Las Palmeras colony, a Santa Fe provincial settlement for Jewish immigrants escaping from the Russian pogroms of 1880. The grandson and son of Jewish gauchos, he studied in Buenos Aires and Rosario.

== Early career ==
In 1952, Tenembaum graduated from the Higher Institute of Judaic Religious Studies. As a teacher and a professor he taught Hebrew and Yiddish language and literature, the Torah, the Prophets and Mishnah. In 1955, he was appointed Director of the Moises Ville Teacher's Seminar in the province of Santa Fe where he taught the Old Testament and philosophy.

He was First General Director of the Argentine-Israeli Cultural Institute (ICAI), and organized the first Latin American Bible contest. He translated Spanish classics into Hebrew and Haskala literature into Spanish. He also promoted the creation of a fresco by the Argentine master painter Raúl Soldi at the main church in Nazareth, which was completed in 1968.

In 1965, he was a Latin American promoter of the first visit by a Pope to Jerusalem. Granted an award for his work by the Vatican, he was invited to a ceremony at the Vatican City and was received by Pope Paul VI on January 13, 1965. At a separate public ceremony, Monsignor Antonio Caggiano, Cardinal Primate of Argentina, presented him with an Argentine Church award, the first such award granted to a Jew in Argentina.

Along with writer Jorge Luis Borges, he founded la Casa Argentina en Jerusalem, with branches in Buenos Aires and Jerusalem. He has worked on interfaith initiatives with Rabbi Guillermo Schlesinger, Father Carlos Cuccetti, Pastor Sosa, and Father Ernesto Segura, the first President of Argentine House in Israel.

Tenembaum's teacher and mentor was Rabbi Jacobo Fink, an orthodox rabbi in Rio de Janeiro, Haifa, and Buenos Aires.

Together with Shalom Rosenberg, professor of philosophy at the Hebrew University at Jerusalem, Tenembaum co-authored the book Holy Places in the Holy Land.

== Kidnapping ==
On January 31, 1976, Baruch Tenembaum was kidnapped by rightwing extremists belonging to Argentine Anticommunist Alliance (Triple A), a clandestine state terrorist organization founded under the aegis of José López Rega during the government of President Isabel Perón. The kidnappers accused him of "infecting the Catholic Church with the virus of Judaism" and "spreading ideas of alleged coexistence so as to destroy Christian principles" through his inter-faith work, which they claimed would lead to the destruction of the Creole republic. They also accused him of participation in the alleged conspiracy known as the Andinia Plan.

His wife Perla volunteered as a hostage and was also kidnapped. While Tenembaum was in captivity, Father Horacio Moreno spoke in his support, calling for his freedom from his pulpit at Fatima Church, and later holding a face-to-face meeting with the kidnappers who described themselves as "concerned Catholics". Finally, Tenembaum was released. From then he lived outside of Argentina, leading the international affairs of the Wallenberg Foundations. After the fall of the Argentine military dictatorship, Tenembaum returned to Argentina after eight years in self-imposed exile.

== Activism ==
Baruch Tenembaum successfully campaigned for the installation of a memorial mural dedicated to the victims of the Holocaust inside the Buenos Aires Cathedral. The mural, the first of its kind, was inaugurated by the Cardinal of Argentina and Archbishop of Buenos Aires Antonio Quarracino and unveiled by Tenembaum and Lech Wałęsa in April 1997. Quarracino died in February 1998, and a homage to survivors of the Holocaust was held over his grave in April that year. In 2004, the Vater-Unser Church in Berlin inaugurated a replica of the memorial.

Tenembaum was one of the founders of the International Raoul Wallenberg Foundation, which honours righteous gentiles who saved Jews during The Holocaust. He was invited by Kofi Annan, Secretary-General of the United Nations, to a meeting held on the 90th anniversary of Wallenberg's birth at the Secretary General's residence in New York. At the meeting, Tenembaum presented a Commemorative Medal specially commissioned and coined to mark the anniversary. Annan's wife Nane Annan, Wallenberg's niece, also attended the event.

In October 2003, United States Congressman Tom Lantos, who Wallenberg had saved from the Nazis, made a speech on the floor of the House of Representatives to honor Tenembaum, and had a fuller tribute inserted into the Congressional Record. Tenembaum also received the Royal Order of the Polar Star from King Carl XVI Gustaf of Sweden. Tenembaum has had an audience with the Pope.

== Personal life and death ==
Baruch Tenembaum and his former wife Elsa Kononowicz had three children: Mookie Tenembaum, philosopher, lawyer and conceptual artist, Yoav Tenembaum, historian and author, and Abigail Tenembaum, a strategy consultant. He also has six grandchildren and one great-grandson.

Tenembaum died on 7 December 2025, aged 92.
