= Tatsuo Osako =

Tatsuo Osako (大迫 辰雄 Ōsako Tatsuo; 1917–2003), of Chiba, Japan was a citizen of the Japanese Empire during World War II who is most notable for transporting Jews to safety. He worked as a clerk for the tourism bureau in Tsuruga, a port city in Japan. His role involved aiding refugees, particularly Jewish and other Europeans, who were traveling from Vladivostok, Russia's Pacific port, to Japan before the Pearl Harbor bombing. In his capacity as the ship's escort and clerk, he distributed funds provided by Jewish organizations to assist the refugees.

He escorted over 2,000 Jews who came from German-occupied countries from Vladivostok, Russia to Tsuruga, Japan. Many of them continued from Japan on to the United States. These refugees had transit visas issued by Chiune Sugihara, who is often referred to as the Japanese Schindler.

Osako's work and a photo album he kept of refugees he helped inspired his co-worker, Akira Kitade, to write a book about Japanese people helping Jews escape from the Nazis titled "Visas of life and the epic journey: how the Sugihara survivors reached Japan". He died in 2003.

== See also ==
- Chiune Sugihara
- Setsuzo Kotsuji
