= Rio Negro, Paraná =

Rio Negro
- Municipality
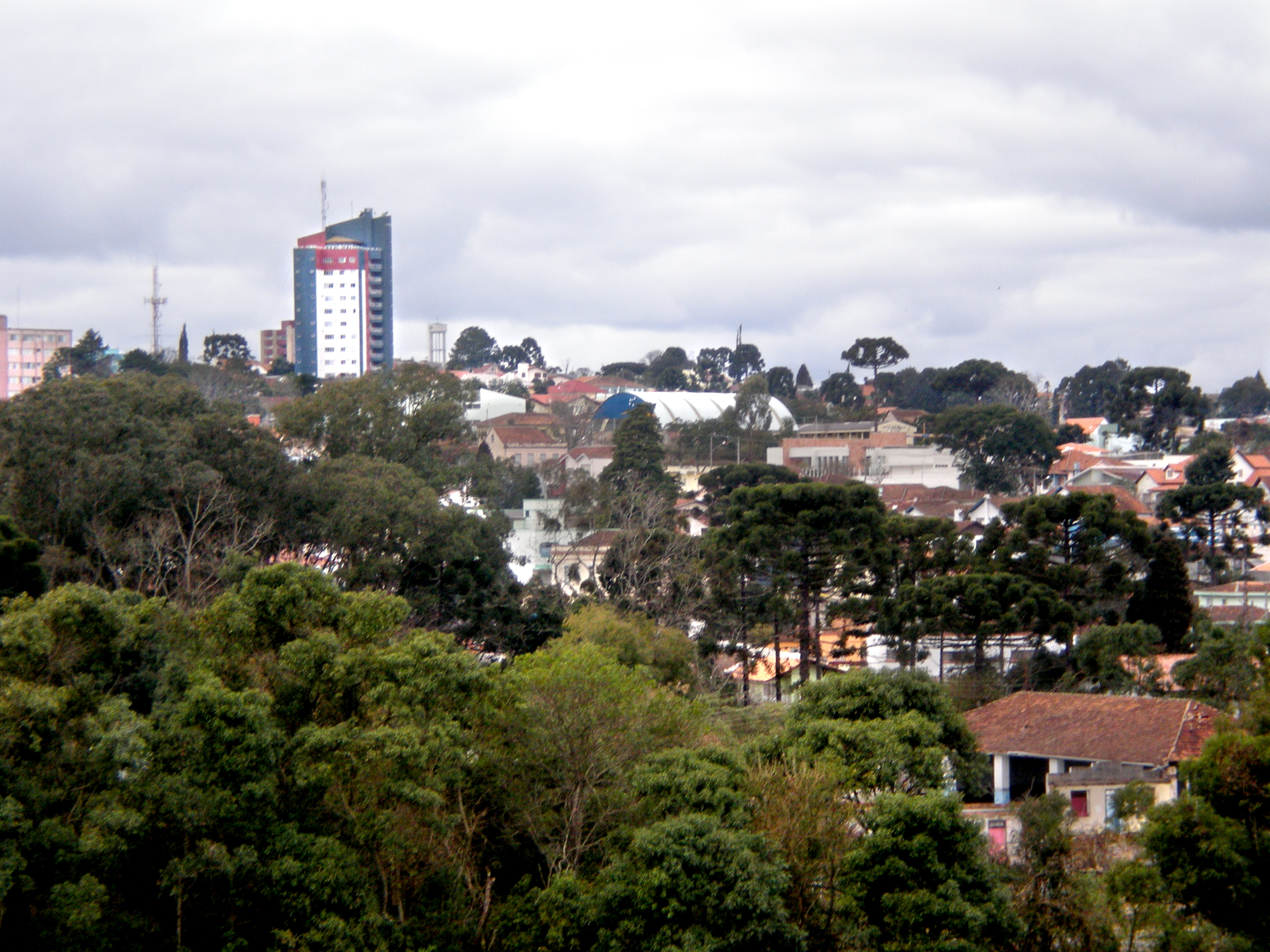

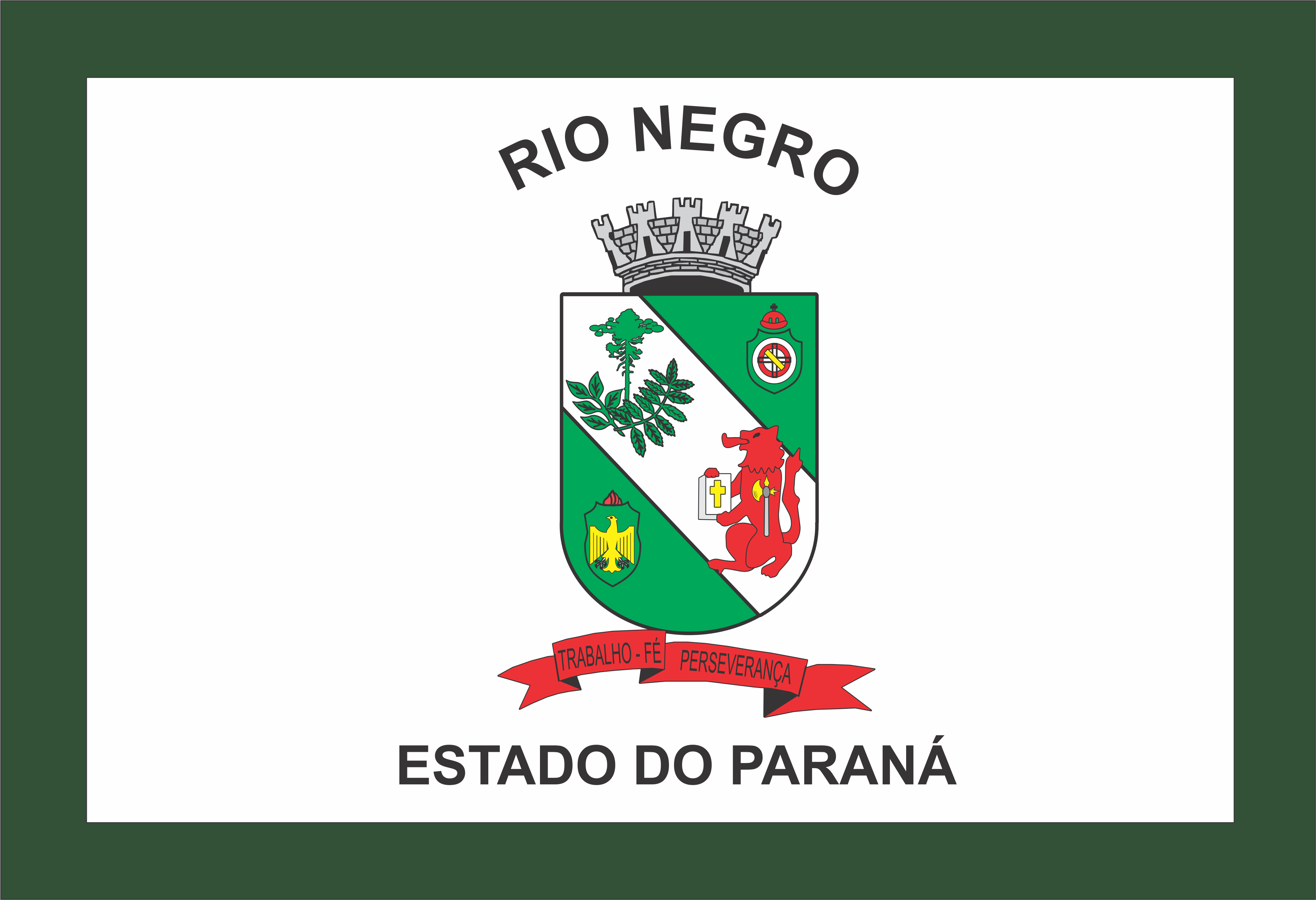
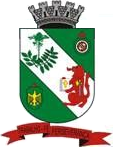
- Flag Coat of arms

- Location in Brazil
- Coordinates: 26°6′21″S 49°47′52″W
- Country: Brazil
- Region: Southern
- State: Paraná
- Mesoregion: Metropolitana de Curitiba

Population (2020)
  - Total: 34,411
- Time zone: UTC−3 (BRT)

Rio Negro is a municipality in the state of Paraná in the South Region of Brazil.

== Climate ==
The climate is highlands subtropical but with precipitation distributed during the year and therefore can be classified as Cfb (according with Köppen classification), commonly referred to as oceanic climate. Share features with plateau areas of Paraná and the other states of southern Brazil. The summers are warm and occasionally hot and the winters are cold by Brazilian standards, although short and mild in general. The rainfall is well distributed over 60 mm in the dry month, totaling a total of 1419 mm typical for this climatic category. Snow is rare, but more conducive than Curitiba, for example.

Climate data for Rio Negro (Campo do Gado), elevation: 824 m, 1961-1990 normals
Month	Jan	Feb	Mar	Apr	May	Jun	Jul	Aug	Sep	Oct	Nov	Dec	Year
Record high °C (°F)	36.8 (98.2)	39.5 (103.1)	34.2 (93.6)	32.3 (90.1)	29 (84)	27.8 (82.0)	28.3 (82.9)	30.3 (86.5)	32.8 (91.0)	33.2 (91.8)	33.4 (92.1)	35.2 (95.4)	39.5 (103.1)
Mean daily maximum °C (°F)	27.4 (81.3)	27.5 (81.5)	26.1 (79.0)	23.6 (74.5)	21.4 (70.5)	19.9 (67.8)	19.9 (67.8)	21.2 (70.2)	22.2 (72.0)	23.5 (74.3)	25.7 (78.3)	26.7 (80.1)	23.8 (74.8)
Daily mean °C (°F)	20.4 (68.7)	20.7 (69.3)	19.3 (66.7)	16.6 (61.9)	14.1 (57.4)	12.9 (55.2)	12.3 (54.1)	13.6 (56.5)	15.0 (59.0)	16.6 (61.9)	18.3 (64.9)	19.7 (67.5)	16.6 (61.9)
Mean daily minimum °C (°F)	13.4 (56.1)	13.9 (57.0)	12.5 (54.5)	9.6 (49.3)	6.8 (44.2)	5.9 (42.6)	4.7 (40.5)	6.0 (42.8)	7.8 (46.0)	9.7 (49.5)	10.9 (51.6)	12.7 (54.9)	9.5 (49.1)
Record low °C (°F)	7.4 (45.3)	9.7 (49.5)	3.8 (38.8)	0.6 (33.1)	−3.6 (25.5)	−6.1 (21.0)	−5.6 (21.9)	−7.4 (18.7)	−2.6 (27.3)	1.7 (35.1)	2.6 (36.7)	5.4 (41.7)	−7.4 (18.7)
Average precipitation mm (inches)	153.0 (6.02)	170.7 (6.72)	148.1 (5.83)	67.4 (2.65)	97.3 (3.83)	92.7 (3.65)	79.6 (3.13)	87.6 (3.45)	117.9 (4.64)	144.6 (5.69)	107.3 (4.22)	153.5 (6.04)	1,419.7 (55.87)
Average relative humidity (%)	81.0	83.0	83.0	83.0	81.0	83.0	81.0	80.0	82.0	80.0	78.0	80.0	81.3
Source 1: NOAA
Source 2: WeatherBase (extremes)

== See also ==
- List of municipalities in Paraná
