= Gilberto Bosques Saldívar =

Mexican politician

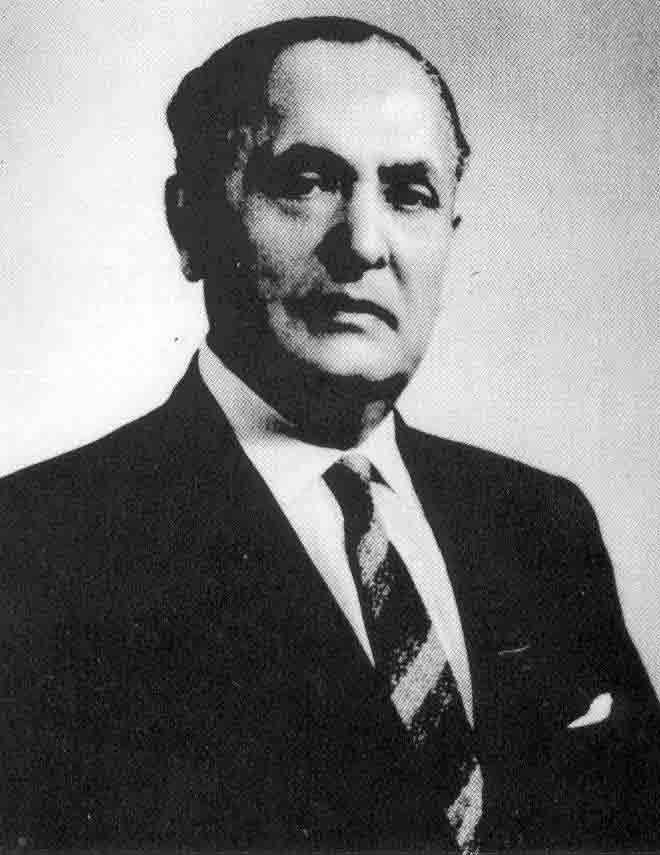

Personal details
- Born: 20 July 1892 Chiautla de Tapia, Puebla, Mexico
- Died: 4 July 1995 (aged 102) Mexico City, Mexico
- Spouse: María Luisa Manjarrez
- Children: Laura María, María Teresa and Gilberto Froylán
- Occupation: Diplomat, politician, journalist

Gilberto Bosques Saldívar (20 July 1892 – 4 July 1995) was a Mexican diplomat, a leftist legislator, and served as a militant in the Mexican Revolution. As a consul in Marseille, Vichy France, Bosques (Note: Regarding the spelling of his second surname: Under Hispanic cultural tradition, a person's second surname, when they use one, is that of their mother. Etymologically, the surname Saldívar is Zaldívar. In Hispanic America, it occasionally happens that the 'z' in the spelling of a surname is replaced with 's'.) took initiative to rescue tens of thousands of Jews and Spanish Republican exiles from being deported to Nazi Germany or Francoist Spain.

However, his heroism remained unknown to the world at large for some sixty years, until several years after his death at the age of 102 (not 103, as sometimes reported). For about two decades after World War II, Bosques served as Mexico's ambassador to several countries. Since 2003, there has been increasing international recognition of his actions in Europe. In 1944, he described his efforts thus: "I followed the policy of my country, of material and moral support to the heroic defenders of the Spanish Republic, the stalwart paladins of the struggle against Hitler, Mussolini, Franco, Petain, and Laval."

== Early years, family and education ==
Gilberto Bosques Saldívar was born in Chiautla, a mountain village in southern portion of the state of Puebla, southeast of Mexico City.

At age 17, he took up arms in the Mexican Revolution under the command of Aquiles Serdán Alatriste, the first martyr of the Revolution.

== Career ==
=== Journalism and politics ===
Bosques organized the First National Pedagogy Congress (Primer Congreso Nacional Pedagógico), and he worked as a journalist with several newspapers and publications.

He subsequently served as a state legislator in Puebla and as a federal deputy on two occasions: 1922–23 and again in 1934–1937. In the latter period, he belonged to a bloc of legislators supporting the new president, general Lázaro Cárdenas (1934–1940). He was the President of the Chamber of Deputies in 1935. In 1938, he was the director of the government owned newspaper, El Nacional.

=== Mexican Consul in France ===
Bosques was stationed in France from 1939–1943, coinciding with most of World War II, initially as Mexico's Consul General. Fleeing the German occupation of Paris in May 1940, Bosques was instructed by his government to organize a consulate to represent Mexico in Vichy France, which he set up in Marseille. Once Nazi Germany had occupied France and entrusted much of the governance of the country to Vichy France, he directed consular employees to issue a visa to anybody wanting to flee to Mexico. Under his auspices, visas were issued to approximately 40,000 people, mostly Jews and Spaniards. The Spaniards rescued were refugees from Francoist Spain after the conclusion of the Spanish Civil War in April 1939. Bosques rented a castle and a summer holiday camp in Marseilles to house refugees under the protection of what he maintained was Mexican territory under international law.

Bosques' courageous initiatives and actions mirror those of two other consuls placed in similar situations in war-torn Europe, such as the Portuguese consul Aristides de Sousa Mendes in Bordeaux, France, and the Japanese consul Chiune Sugihara in Kaunas, Lithuania.

In 1943, Bosques, his family (wife and three children), and 40 consular staff members were arrested by the Gestapo and detained in a "hotel-prison" in Germany for a year. He was released under an agreement between the German and Mexican governments after Manuel Ávila Camacho (then President of Mexico from 1940–1946) made an exchange of prisoners with imprisoned German citizens.

=== Post-World War II ===
Bosques and his family returned to Mexico in 1944.

In the decades after his release from German captivity, he served as Ambassador of Mexico in several countries: Portugal, Finland, Sweden and Cuba. In 1962, during the Cuban Missile Crisis, Bosques — who was both a personal friend of Fidel Castro and the diplomatic representative of a neutral country trusted by the United States, the Soviet Union and Cuba, worked to facilitate communications between the disputants and bring Cuba into agreement with the "face-saving" agreements worked out between the two nuclear powers.

== Personal life and death ==
Bosques was married to María Luisa Manjarrez. He had three children: Laura, María Teresa and Gilberto Froylán. In his retirement in Mexico, he translated and wrote poetry.

Bosques Saldívar died just days short of his 103rd birthday.

== Legacy and recognition ==
Bosques's feat in saving nearly 40,000 people from execution by the Third Reich or Francoist Spain went unrecognized even among specialists in the history of rescuers of Jews until after 2000, and especially the year 2008. At a ceremony in Beverly Hills, California, on 13 November 2008, the Anti-Defamation League (ADL) posthumously awarded him the Courage to Care Award, created in 1987 to honor rescuers of Jews during the Holocaust Era. But this was not the first major posthumous recognition given to him. He was memorialized in Vienna on 4 June 2003 by having a street in the 22nd district named after him: the Gilberto-Bosques-Promenade.

In 2007, Embajador Gilberto Bosques: un hombre de todos los tiempos (Ambassador Gilberto Bosques: a man for all times), a photographic exhibition in his honor, was mounted at the Jewish and Holocaust History Museum in the Condesa neighborhood in Mexico City. In 2008, this exhibition traveled to Xalapa, Veracruz.

On 20 July 2017, Google celebrated his 125th birthday with a Google Doodle.

Lillian Lieberman's 2010 documentary Visa to Paradise (Visa al paraíso) is based on Bosques' life.

== See also ==
- Mexican Jews
- Refugee workers in Vichy France

== Bibliography ==
- "Human Rights Commission of Mexico City will propose naming a street in honor of Bosques". cdhdf.org.mx (Press release). Comisión de Derechos Humanos del Distrito Federal. 24 June 2007.
