= Luis Martins de Souza Dantas =

Brazilian diplomat (1876–1954)

Luiz Martins de Souza Dantas
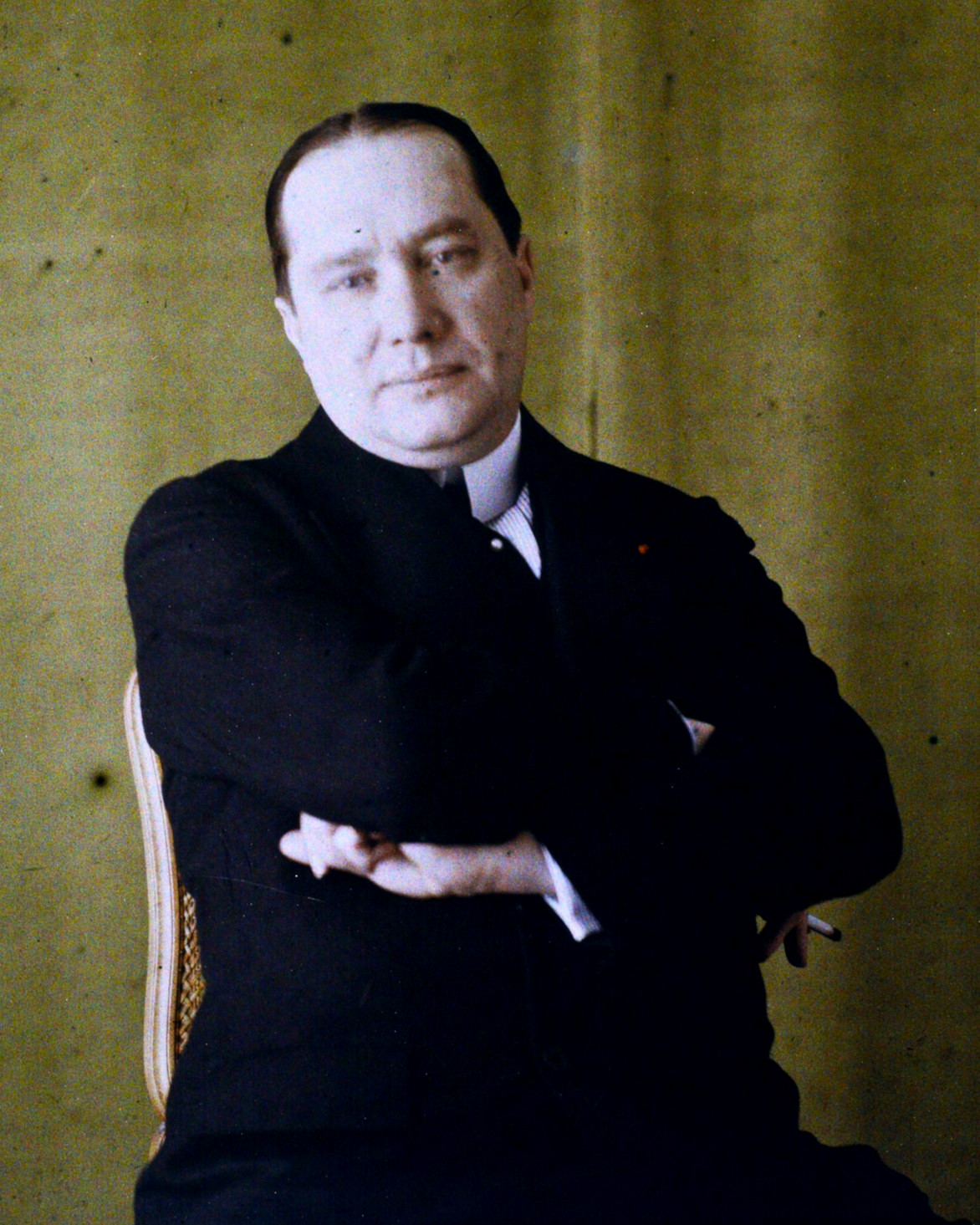
- 1927 Autochrome by Georges Chevalier
- Born: 17 February 1876; Rio de Janeiro, Empire of Brazil
- Died: 16 April 1954 (aged 78); Paris, France
- Occupation: Diplomat
- Honours: Righteous Among the Nations

Signature
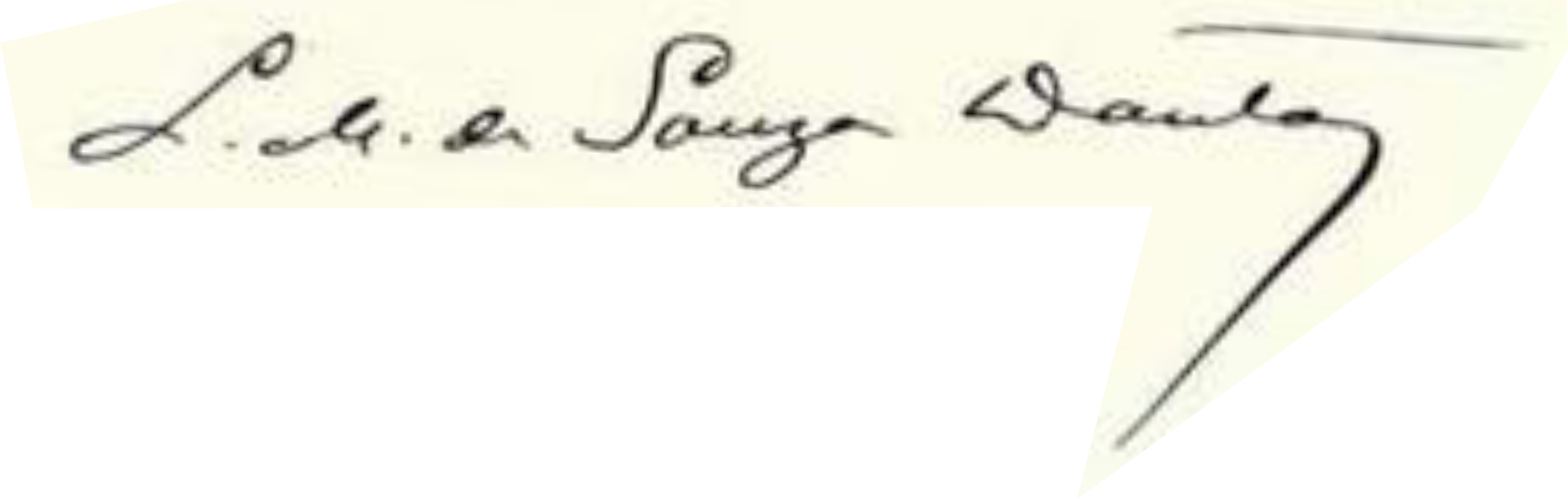

Luiz Martins de Souza Dantas (17 February 1876 – 16 April 1954) was a Brazilian diplomat who was awarded the title Righteous Among the Nations by Yad Vashem in June 2003, for his actions during World War II in helping Jews in France escape The Holocaust. It is estimated he saved 800 people, 425 confirmed to be Jewish. His actions were not limited to saving Jews, but also other persecuted groups, such as communists and homosexuals.

== Early life and career ==
Souza Dantas was born to an aristocratic family in Brazil. His father, Manuel Pinto de Sousa Dantas filho, had been President of the provinces of Pará and Paraná and his grandfather, Manuel Pinto de Sousa Dantas, had been a Senator and Prime Minister of Brazil. After completing law studies at age 21, he entered the Ministry of Foreign Affairs. He rose through the ranks of the diplomatic service and served in various world capitals. In 1916, during World War I, he was appointed interim foreign minister for a few months. He reached the rank of ambassador in 1919, when he began to lead the Brazilian embassy in Rome. In late 1922 he was named ambassador of Brazil to France, a position he held until 1944. Between 1924 and 1926, during some periods, he was also the representative of the Brazilian government to the League of Nations.

== World War II ==
Luiz Martins de Souza Dantas was serving as the Brazilian ambassador to France and to the Vichy Government during the German occupation. Despite complaints and investigations into his activities by other Brazilian diplomats, as well as the tightening of Brazilian immigration laws regarding Jewish immigration, he was motivated by "a Christian feeling of mercy" to save hundreds from persecution by the Nazis by issuing diplomatic travel visas for entry into Brazil.

After being ordered to stop issuing these visas, he would often forge the issue date to a date prior to the order. He would also remove any mention of Jewish ancestry from the applicant's history. Unlike other diplomats at the time, Souza Dantas did not grant visas for personal gain or to a select group. In a 1942 letter to Brazil's foreign minister Osvaldo Aranha, he said the camps set up by the Nazis were like something out of Dante's Inferno, where Jews were either slaves or were exterminated. Among those he helped save were the 12-year-old Felix G. Rohatyn, a future investment banker, and the Rohatyn family.

An investigation was opened by the administrative department of the public service in charge of Ambassador Dantas. He was accused of granting irregular visas. In an Itamaraty telegram, Souza Dantas affirmed in his defense that after the prohibition he did not grant "even a visa". It was a lie. Chana Strozemberg, a woman from Poland, obtained a visa issued in January 1941, a month after the prohibition, but with false information.

Eventually the investigation and suspicions of Luiz Martins de Souza Dantas were enough for him to be recalled by Getúlio Vargas, the Brazilian President of the time, where he faced disciplinary hearing for his actions. He was found guilty of breaking the Brazilian Jewish immigration policy. He was able to escape punishment since he was technically retired and only working for the government on special request. After the war he returned to Paris, where he died in obscurity on 14 April 1954.

He married a Jewish woman from San Francisco, Elise Meyer Stern, daughter of Eugene Meyer and widow of Abraham Stern, who had been secretary of Levi Strauss & Co.
