= Kanoh Ghoya =

Kanoh Ghoya (後屋 加納, Ghoya Kanoh; 1901 – 1983), sometimes spelled Kano Ghoya, was a Japanese official who served as vice-chief of the Stateless Refugees' Affairs Bureau in the Shanghai Ghetto during World War II. He was responsible for issuing passes to Jewish refugees confined to the Hongkou district between 1943 and 1945. Ghoya became notorious among refugees for his arbitrary cruelty and self-proclaimed title as "King of the Jews."

== Background and Position ==
Following the establishment of the "Designated Area for Stateless Refugees" on February 18, 1943, Ghoya was appointed to oversee the administration of passes that Jewish refugees needed to leave the restricted area in Hongkou. As an official of the Japanese occupation administration, he held considerable power over the daily lives of approximately 18,000-20,000 Jewish refugees who had fled Nazi-occupied Europe.

== Treatment of Refugees ==
Ghoya gained notoriety for his capricious and humiliating treatment of Jewish refugees seeking passes to leave the ghetto for work, medical care, or other necessities. According to survivor testimonies and historical accounts, he was known for:

- Arbitrarily denying passes based on his mood
- Physically assaulting applicants, including slapping faces
- Forcing refugees to wait for hours or return multiple times
- Demanding that applicants bow deeply or perform other humiliating acts

His unpredictable behavior and abuse of authority made obtaining passes—essential for survival and employment—a traumatic experience for many refugees.

== "King of the Jews" ==
Ghoya frequently referred to himself as the "King of the Jews," a title that reflected both his complete authority over the refugee population and his megalomaniacal personality. This self-designation became synonymous with his reign of arbitrary terror over the Shanghai Ghetto's inhabitants.

== Post-War Depictions ==
After Japan's surrender in September 1945, Jewish artist Fritz Melchior, who had been a refugee in Shanghai, created a series of satirical cartoons featuring Ghoya. These seven cartoons, printed at the Festa Paper MFG. CO. on Ward Road, depicted Ghoya's "arrogance, insolence and rudeness" and served as a form of post-war mockery and catharsis for the refugee community. A pamphlet titled "Good-bye Mr. Ghoya" was published in Shanghai in September 1945, immediately following the war's end, serving as a denunciation of his actions during his administration of the ghetto.

== Legacy ==
Ghoya's name has become emblematic of the arbitrary cruelty experienced by Jewish refugees in the Shanghai Ghetto. While conditions in Shanghai were generally better than in European ghettos, and the death rate was relatively low, Ghoya's personal conduct represented a daily source of humiliation and fear for the refugee population. His story is preserved in survivor testimonies, museum collections, and historical accounts as part of the broader narrative of Jewish refugee experiences during World War II.

== See also ==
- Shanghai Ghetto
- Japan and the Holocaust
- Shanghai Jewish Refugees Museum
- Ho Feng-Shan
- Chiune Sugihara
- Josef Meisinger
