= Japan and the Holocaust =

Japan in World War II

Although Japan was a member of the Axis, and therefore an ally of Nazi Germany, it did not actively participate nor directly support the Germans in carrying out the Holocaust. (Note: This article refers to the Holocaust of the Jewish people. some scholars also use the term holocaust in the context of the Japanese war crimes against Chinese, Koreans and people of other lands occupied or annexed by the Japanese empire. The term "Japanese Holocaust" has also been used to describe the atomic bombings of Hiroshima and Nagasaki.) Antisemitic attitudes were insignificant in Japan during World War II and there was little interest in the Jewish question, which was seen as a European issue. Furthermore, Nazi Germany did not pressure Japan on the issue.

== Background ==
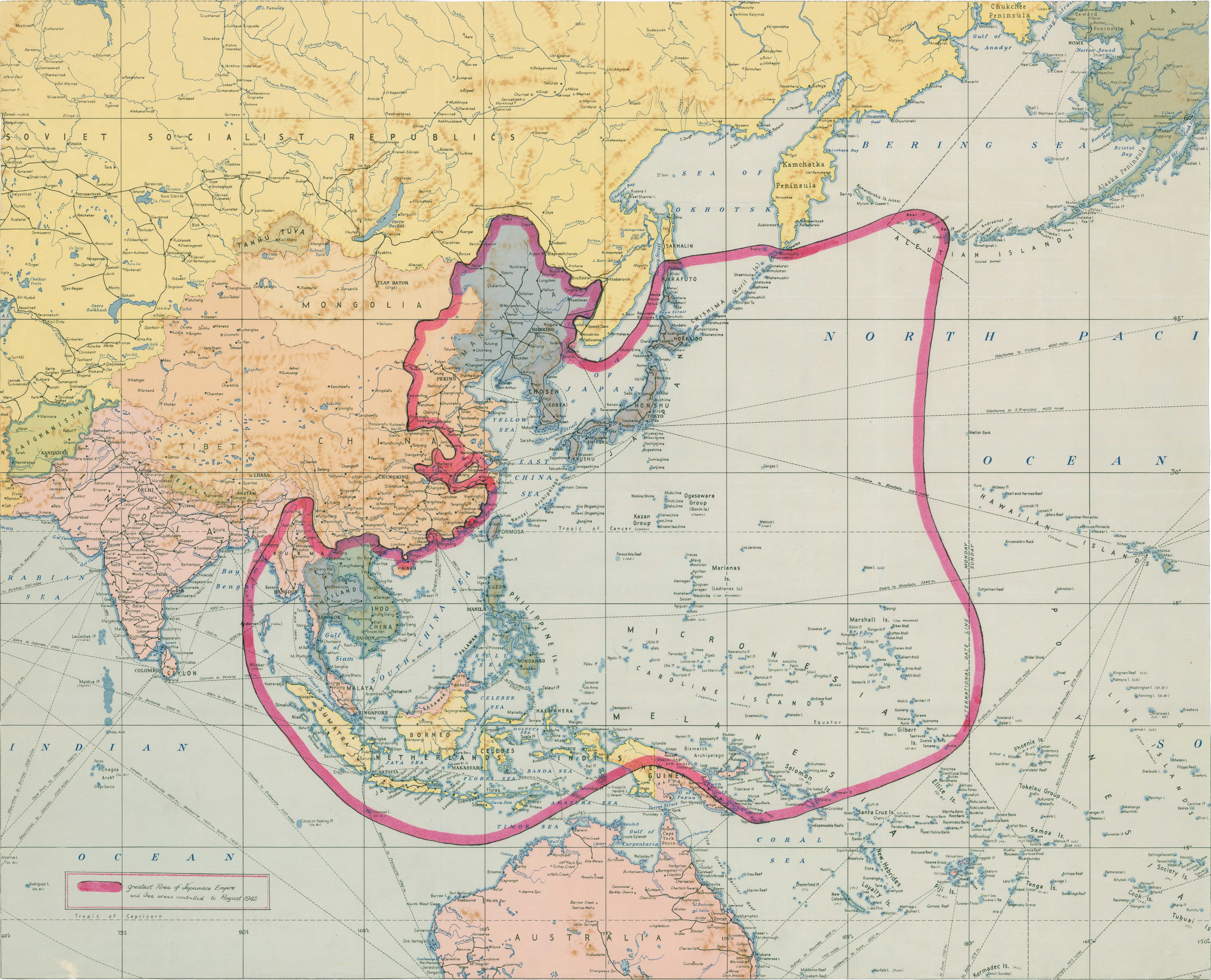
Map of territories held by the Japanese in 1942

After the signing of the Washington Naval Treaty, the Japanese military personnel provoked the Mukden Incident in Manchuria before the Prime Minister Saitō Makoto established the Centre of Japan Spiritual Culture in 1932, to train teachers who spread the idea to expand military and trade, with the Japanese nationalism. Arms merchants such as Friedrich Wilhelm Hack did business in Tokyo. By the time, the first Nazi group in Asia was formed in Hankou (now, Wuhan), to take control of the German settlements in Asia. (Note: The leader was soon replaced to Franz Xaver Hasenöhrl.)

After the vigorous activities against the Naval Treaty by the Imperial Bar Association and military men such as Chūichi Nagumo, the Imperial Diet of Japan approved the withdrawal from the treaty in December 1934, which made the treaty expire in 1936. In the same year before that, the first Nazi group in Japan has been formed in Tokyo and Yokohama, with the effort of Hiroshi Oshima, a highly pro-German diplomat who had been appointed military attache to Berlin.

In 1936, the German–Japanese Pact, also known as the Anti-Comintern Pact, was concluded between Nazi Germany and Japan, and it was directed against the Communist International (Comintern). It was signed by German ambassador-at-large Joachim von Ribbentrop and Japanese ambassador to Germany Kintomo Mushanokōji.

The Japanese signatories had hoped that the Anti-Comintern Pact would effectively be an alliance against the Soviet Union, which is certainly how the Soviets perceived it. The Kitakarafuto Oil which the Imperial Navy run in the North Sakhalin in the Soviet Union lost the oil concession while the trade between Nazis company such as IG Farben and Manchuria under Imperial Japan was enhanced.

There was also a secret additional protocol which specified a joint German-Japanese policy specifically aimed against the Soviet Union. After August 1939, Japan distanced itself from Germany as a result of the Molotov–Ribbentrop Pact. The Anti-Comintern Pact was followed by the September 1940 Tripartite Pact, which identified the United States as the primary threat rather than the Soviet Union, however by December 1941 this too was virtually inoperative. The Anti-Comintern Pact was subsequently renewed in November 1941 and saw the entry of several new members into the pact.

Though the Japanese government had kept censorship on the press since the Publishing law executed in 1869, journalists, activists, writers, and even poets of Haiku were strongly oppressed under the Special Higher Police or the courts during the period. There were deceased victims such as editors in Yokohama incident and Takiji Kobayashi.

== During World War II ==
On December 6, 1938, the Japanese government made a decision of prohibiting the expulsion of the Jews in Japan, Manchukuo, and the rest of Japanese-occupied China. This was described as "amoral", based primarily on the consideration of avoiding antagonizing the United States. Even after Japan and United States became involved in a war against each other, the Japanese government's neutrality towards the Jews continued.

Japanese media reported on the rising anti-semitism in Germany, but once Japan joined the Axis, news that presented Germany in negative light were subject to censorship. While some Western media would eventually publish some pieces about the plight of Jews during wartime, this topic was not raised by the Japanese media. Neither did Nazi Germany pressure Japan on this issue, and the Japanese government was not interested in this issue, which most of its members, just like the general public, were simply not aware of.

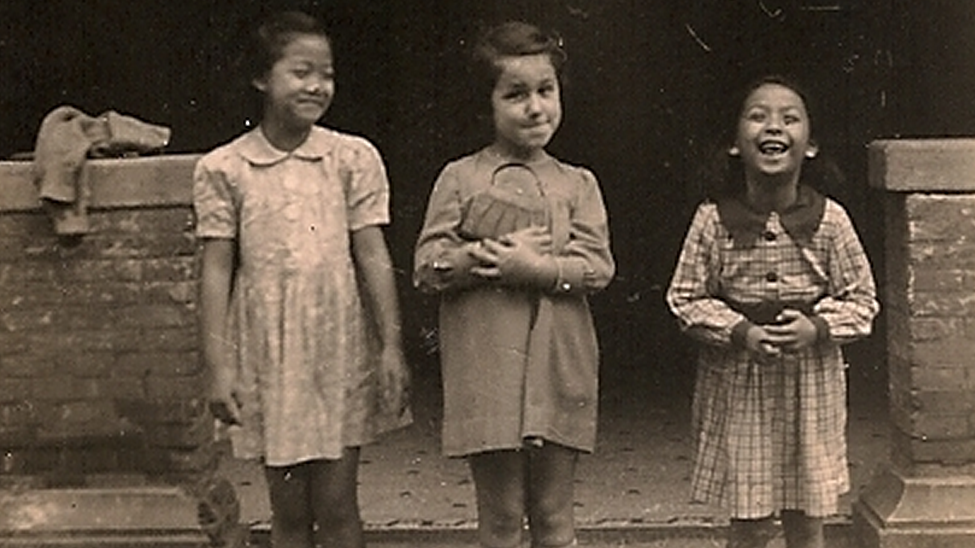
A Jewish girl and her Chinese friends in the Shanghai Ghetto, from the collection of the Shanghai Jewish Refugees Museum

In 1941, SS-Colonel Josef Meisinger, a Gestapo liaison at the German embassy in Tokyo, tried to influence the Japanese to exterminate approximately 18,000–20,000 Jews who had escaped from Austria and Germany and who were living in the Japanese-occupied Shanghai International Settlement. His proposals included the creation of a concentration camp on Chongming Island in the delta of the Yangtze, or starvation on freighters off the coast of China. The Japanese admiral responsible for overseeing Shanghai would not yield to pressure from Meisinger; however, the Japanese built a ghetto in the neighborhood of Hongkew which had already been planned by Tokyo in 1939: a slum with about twice the population density of Manhattan. The ghetto was strictly isolated by Japanese soldiers under the command of the Japanese official Kano Ghoya, and Jews could only leave it with special permission. Some 2,000 of them died in the Shanghai Ghetto during the wartime period; however conditions in the ghetto were described as generally good, as the Japanese authorities did not discriminate against the Jews more so than towards other Europeans in the occupied city. A Chinese diplomat in Vienna, Ho Feng-Shan, who disobeyed his superiors and issued thousands of visas to Jewish refugees to go in Shanghai in 1938–1939, would eventually receive the Righteous Among the Nations title.

In 1940–1941, Japanese diplomat Chiune Sugihara, vice-consul of the Empire in the Lithuanian Soviet Republic, granted more than 2,000 transit visas and saved 6,000 Jewish refugees, allowing them to depart Lithuania before it was overrun by the Germans. After the war he was recognized as Righteous Among the Nations, the only Japanese citizen to receive that honor.

Many Jewish scientists were involved in the Manhattan Project; Meron Medzini noted that they did not object to dropping the atomic bomb on Japan instead of Germany; and that "we do not know if the [Jewish] scientists were aware that Japan was not involved in the Holocaust", also observing that much of their information about Japan must have come from American wartime propaganda, which sought to "demonize and dehumanize the Japanese people".

== After the war ==
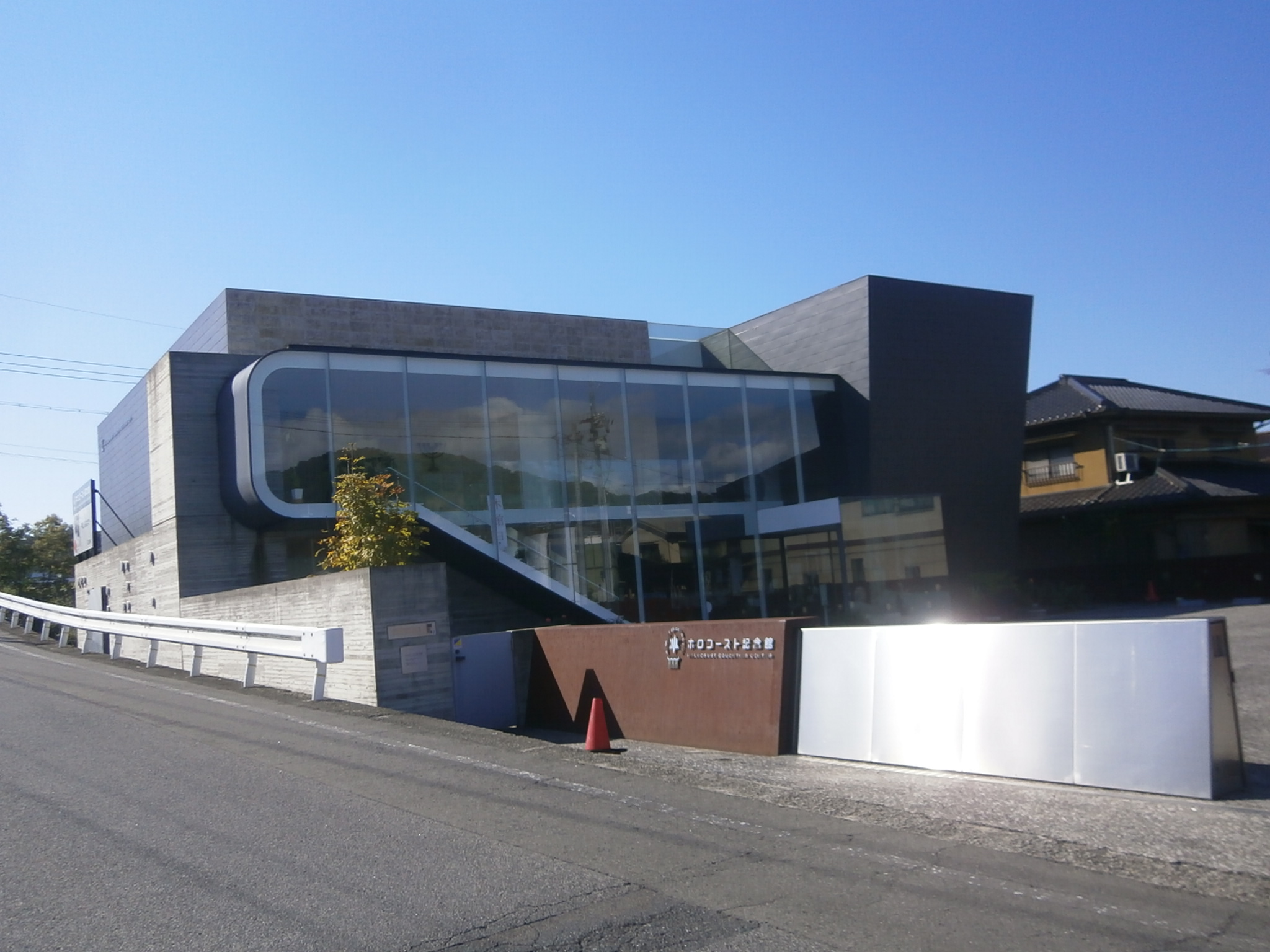
Holocaust Education Center in Fukuyama, Hiroshima

Awareness of the Holocaust in Japan did not immediately increase after the war ended, as neither the Japanese authorities nor the United States occupying forces saw the topic as particularly significant. This changed in the early 1950s, as the topic became popularized by the translation of The Diary of Anne Frank, which was published in Japan in 1952 and sold several million copies. In 1995, the Fukuyama Holocaust Education Center, the only Holocaust-dedicated museum in Asia outside Israel, was opened.

On the other hand, Holocaust denial views also spread, particularly since the 1980s, popularized among others by works of Masami Uno. In February 1995, a magazine named Marco Polo (マルコポーロ), a 250,000-circulation monthly aimed at Japanese males, ran a Holocaust denial article; it was criticized and the magazine shut down shortly afterward.

Japanese officials and scholars often compared American detention camps for the Japanese to the Nazi concentration camps, which has been criticized as part of attempting to minimize Japanese's role as the aggressor in WWII.

== See also ==
- The Holocaust in Italy
- Japanese history textbook controversies

== Sources ==
- McKale, Donald M. (1977). "The Nazi Party in the Fast East, 1931-45". Journal of Contemporary History. 12. Sage Publishing: 291–311. doi:10.1177/002200947701200205.
