= Little Vienna =

Little Vienna is a nickname, which may refer to cities and towns that closely resemble the architecture of the Austrian capital of Vienna:

- Arad, Romania, a city in Romania
- Bielsko-Biała, a city in Poland
- Cieszyn, a town in Poland
- Chernivtsi, a city in Ukraine
- Shanghai Ghetto around Zhoushan Road
- Lviv, a city in Ukraine
- Osijek, a city in Croatia
- Ruse, Bulgaria, a city in Bulgaria
- Šumperk, a town in the Czech Republic
- Timișoara, a city in Romania
- Varaždin, a city in Croatia
- Zagreb, a city in Croatia
