= Japanese Holocaust =

Japanese Holocaust can refer to:

- Japanese war crimes
- Japan and the Holocaust
- Atomic bombings of Hiroshima and Nagasaki
