= Shanghai Ghetto =

Ghetto in Japanese-occupied Shanghai

Coordinates: 31°15′54″N 121°30′18″E

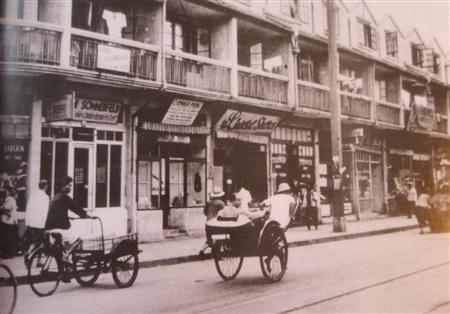
- Seward Road in the ghetto in 1943

Chinese name
- Traditional Chinese: 上海難民營
- Simplified Chinese: 上海难民营
- Literal meaning: Shanghai refugee camp
Transcriptions
Standard Mandarin
- Hanyu Pinyin: Shànghǎi nànmínyíng
- Wade–Giles: Shang^{4}-hai^{3} nan^{4}-min^{2}-ying^{2}

Restricted Sector for Stateless Refugees
- Traditional Chinese: 無國籍難民限定地區
- Simplified Chinese: 无国籍难民限定地区
Transcriptions
Standard Mandarin
- Hanyu Pinyin: Wú guójí nànmín xiàndìng dìqū
- Wade–Giles: Wu^{2} kuo^{2}-chi^{2} nan^{4}-min^{2} hsien^{4}-ting^{4} ti^{4}-ch'ü^{1}

Japanese name
- Kanji: 無国籍難民限定地区
Transcriptions
- Romanization: Mu kokuseki nanmin gentei chiku

The Shanghai Ghetto, formally known as the Restricted Sector for Stateless Refugees, was an area of approximately 2.5 square kilometres (1 square mile) in the Hongkou district of Japanese-occupied Shanghai (the ghetto was located in the southern Hongkou and southwestern Yangpu districts which formed part of the Shanghai International Settlement). The area included the community around the Ohel Moshe Synagogue. Shanghai was notable for a long period as the only place in the world that unconditionally offered refuge for Jews escaping from the Nazis. According to the Simon Wiesenthal Center, Shanghai accepted more Jewish refugees than Canada, Australia, New Zealand, South Africa and India. After the Japanese occupied the International Settlement in 1941, the Japanese army closed Shanghai to Jewish immigration. In 1943, the Japanese forced about 23,000 of the city's Jewish refugees to be restricted or relocated to the Shanghai Ghetto until 1945 by the Proclamation Concerning Restriction of Residence and Business of Stateless Refugees. It was one of the poorest and most crowded areas of the city, already occupied by 100,000 Chinese; the local Chinese residents, whose living conditions were often as bad or worse, did not leave. Local Jewish families and American Jewish charities aided Jewish refugees with shelter, food, and clothing. As the war progressed, Japanese authorities increasingly stepped up restrictions of movement and surrounded the ghetto with barbed wire. However, compared with the Nazi ghettos of Europe, conditions in the Shanghai Ghetto were considerably less severe. Among the war refugees were large numbers of musicians, physicians and other professionals that made contributions to China, for example the founding members of China's first symphony orchestra and the dean of the neurology department of St John's University.

== Emigrant plans ==
From 1934, one year after the Nazi Party came to power in Germany, people began formulating plans to shelter Jewish refugees in China. University of Charleston history professor Gao Bei has described the following three.

=== The Maurice William Plan (1934) ===
Maurice William, a Russian Jewish dentist who lived in New York, was the first to suggest China as a shelter for Jewish refugees. William first showed his proposal to Albert Einstein in January 1934, who is recorded as having been impressed by the idea. William sent his plan to China for approval. It was likely declined at that time because China did not want to be seen as opposing Germany.

=== The Sun Fo Plan (1939) ===
Sun Fo (Sun Ke), a Chinese official, suggested accepting Jewish refugees from Germany so as to gain support from Western countries that were sympathetic to the refugees, as well as from the Jewish refugees themselves, and to bolster its fight against Germany's ally, Japan.

=== The Jakob Berglas Plan (1939) ===
Jakob Berglas, a German Jewish businessman, proposed China's acceptance of 100,000 Jewish refugees, each of whom would pay £50, with the resultant £5,000,000 going to support China's war efforts. Fearing, however, that a massive wave of migration might draw attention and attack from Germany, the Chinese government decided to accept Jews only as refugees without citizenship, allowing them to live in China as foreign migrants but not as German citizens.

== Background ==
=== Jews in 1930s Germany ===
At the end of the 1920s, most German Jews were loyal to Germany, assimilated and relatively prosperous. They served in the German army and contributed to every field of German science, business and culture. After the Nazis were elected to power in 1933, state-sponsored antisemitic persecution such as the Nuremberg Laws (1935) and the Kristallnacht (1938) drove masses of German Jews to seek asylum abroad, with over 304,500 German Jews choosing to emigrate from 1933 to 1939. Chaim Weizmann wrote in 1936, "The world seemed to be divided into two parts—those places where the Jews could not live and those where they could not enter."

During the 1930s, there was a growing military conflict between Japan and China. However, in the Shanghai International Settlement, there existed demilitarized areas which provided safe havens where tens of thousands of European Jewish refugees could escape from the growing horrors of the holocaust and also a place where a half million Chinese civilians could find safety.

The Evian Conference demonstrated that by the end of the 1930s, it was almost impossible to find a destination open for Jewish immigration, with only the Dominican Republic being open.

According to Dana Janklowicz-Mann:

Jewish men were being picked up and put into concentration camps. They were told you have X amount of time to leave—two weeks, a month—if you can find a country that will take you. Outside, their wives and friends were struggling to get a passport, a visa, anything to help them get out. But embassies were closing their doors all over, and countries, including the United States, were closing their borders. ... It started as a rumor in Vienna ... "There's a place you can go where you don't need a visa. They have free entry." It just spread like fire and whoever could, went for it.

=== Shanghai after 1937 ===
The International Settlement of Shanghai was established by the Treaty of Nanking. Police, jurisdiction and passport control were implemented by the foreign autonomous board. Under the Unequal Treaties between China and European countries, visas were only required to book tickets departing from Europe.

Following the Battle of Shanghai in 1937, the city was occupied by the army of Imperial Japan, except for the Shanghai International Settlement, which was not occupied by the Japanese until 1941 in the aftermath of the attack on Pearl Harbor. Before 1941, with Japanese permission, the Shanghai International Settlement allowed entry without visa or passport. By the time when most German Jews arrived, two other Jewish communities had already settled in the city: the wealthy Baghdadi Jews, including the Kadoorie and Sassoon families, and the Russian Jews. The latter fled the Russian Empire because of antisemitic pogroms pushed by the Tsarist regime and counter-revolutionary armies. They formed the Russian community in Harbin, then the Russian community in Shanghai.

=== Ho Feng Shan, Chiune Sugihara, Jan Zwartendijk and Tadeusz Romer ===
In 1935, the Chinese diplomat Ho Feng-Shan started his diplomatic career within the Foreign Ministry of the Republic of China. His first posting was in Turkey. He was appointed First Secretary at the Chinese legation in Vienna in 1937. When Austria was annexed by Nazi Germany in 1938, and the legation was turned into a consulate, Ho was assigned the post of Consul-General. After the Kristallnacht in 1938, the situation became rapidly more difficult for the almost 200,000 Austrian Jews. The only way for Jews to escape from Nazism was to leave Europe. In order to leave, they had to provide proof of emigration, usually a visa from a foreign nation, or a valid boat ticket. This was difficult, however, because at the 1938 Évian Conference, 31 countries (including Canada, Australia, and New Zealand—out of a total of 32) refused to accept Jewish immigrants. Motivated by humanitarianism, Ho started to issue transit visas to Shanghai, under Japanese occupation except for foreign concessions. Twelve hundred visas were issued by Ho in only the first three months of holding office as Consul-General.

At the time it was not necessary to have a visa to enter Shanghai, but the visas allowed the Jews to leave Austria. Many Jewish families left for Shanghai, from where most of them would later leave for Hong Kong and Australia. Ho continued to issue these visas until he was ordered to return to China in May 1940. The exact number of visas given by Ho to Jewish refugees is unknown. It is known that Ho issued the 200th visa in June 1938 and signed the 1906th visa on 27 October 1938. How many Jews were saved through his actions is unknown, but given that Ho issued nearly 2,000 visas only during his first half year at his post, the number may be in the thousands. Ho died in 1997 and his actions were recognized posthumously when in 2000 the Israeli organization Yad Vashem decided to award him the title "Righteous Among the Nations".

Many in the Polish-Lithuanian Jewish community were additionally saved by Chiune Sugihara, the Japanese consul in Kaunas, Lithuania, and Jan Zwartendijk, director of the Philips manufacturing plants in Lithuania and part-time acting consul of the Dutch government-in-exile. The refugees fled across the vast territory of Russia by train to Vladivostok and then by boat to Kobe in Japan. The refugees, totaling 2,185, arrived in Japan from August 1940 to June 1941.

Tadeusz Romer, the Polish ambassador in Tokyo, had managed to get transit visas in Japan, asylum visas to Canada, Australia, New Zealand, Burma, immigration certificates to Palestine, and immigrant visas to the United States and some Latin American countries. Tadeusz Romer moved to Shanghai on 1 November 1941, where he continued to act for Jewish refugees. Among those saved in the Shanghai Ghetto were leaders and students of Mir yeshiva and Tomchei Tmimim.

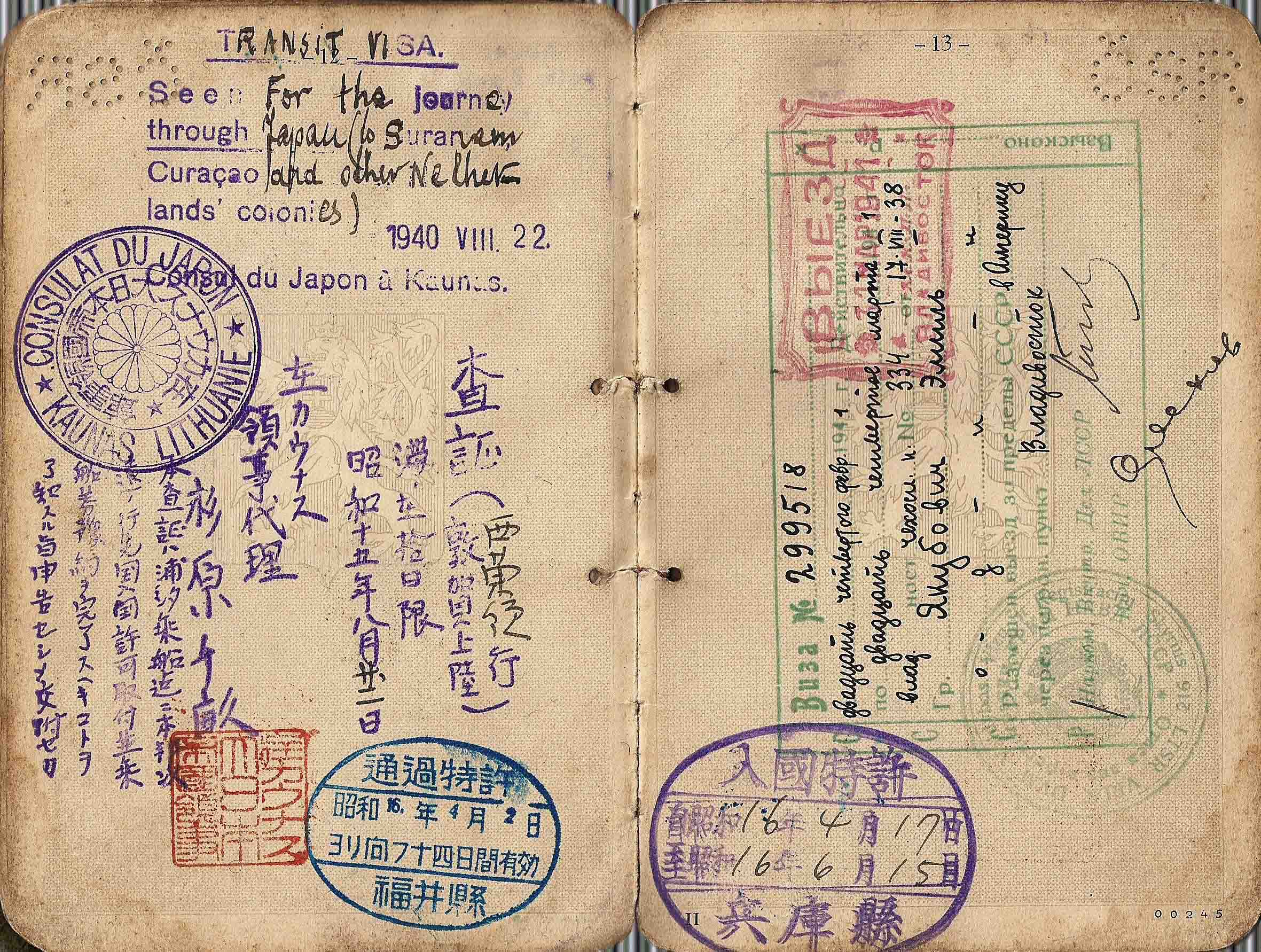
1940 issued visa by consul Sugihara in Lithuania

=== Arrival of Ashkenazi Jews ===
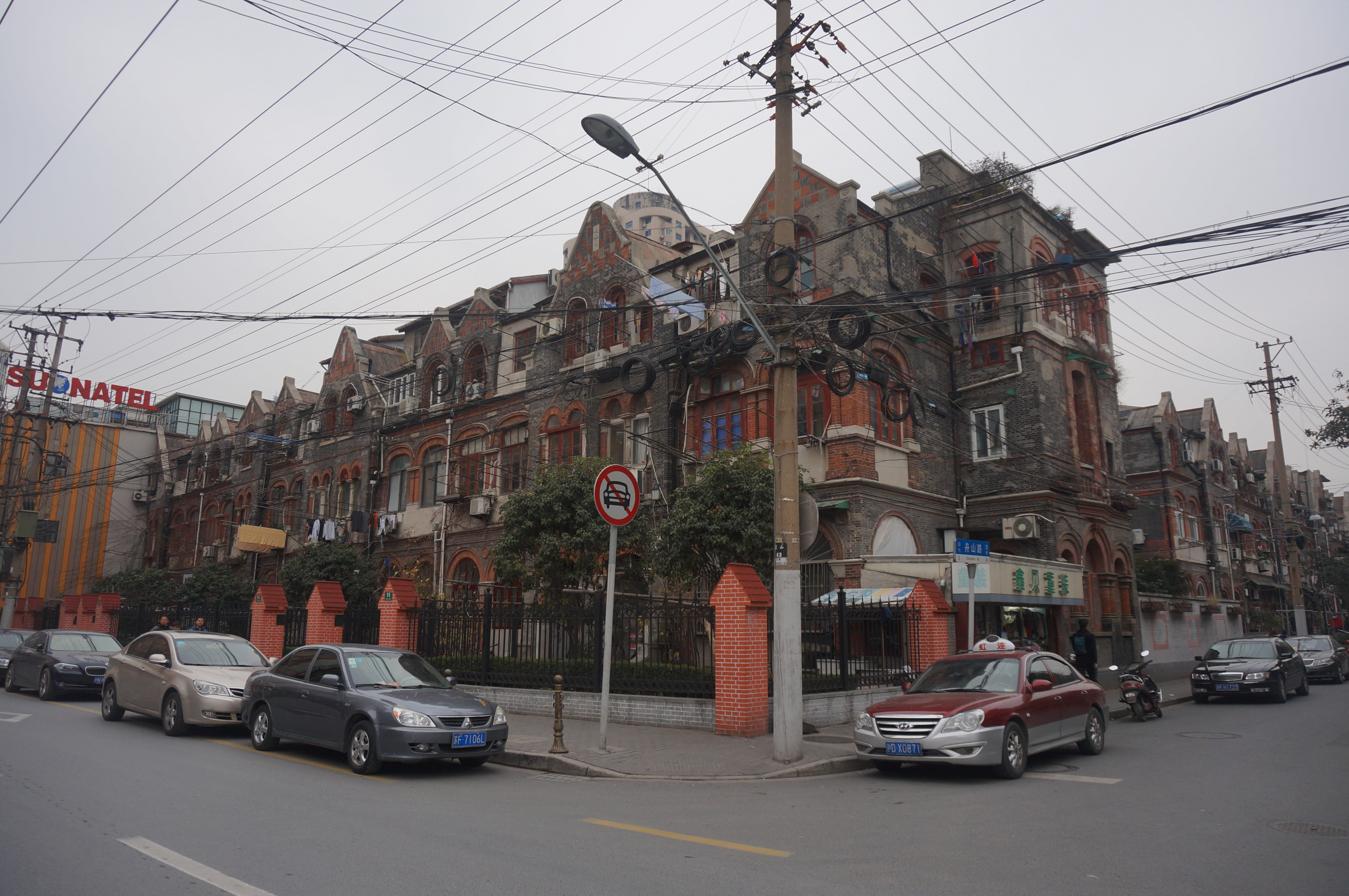
Current view of once important business area in the ghetto, the intersection of Huoshan Road and Zhoushan Road, also calle "Little Vienna", for its many cafés and street life

The refugees who managed to purchase tickets for luxurious Italian and Japanese cruise steamships departing from Genoa later described their three-week journey with plenty of food and entertainment—between persecution in Germany and squalid ghetto in Shanghai—as surreal. Some passengers attempted to make unscheduled departures in Egypt, hoping to smuggle themselves into the British Mandate of Palestine.

The first German Jewish refugees—twenty-six families, among them five well-known physicians—had already arrived in Shanghai by November 1933. By the spring of 1934, there were reportedly eighty refugee physicians, surgeons, and dentists in China.

On 15 August 1938, the first Jewish refugees from Anschluss Austria arrived by Italian ship. Most of the refugees arrived after Kristallnacht. During the refugee flight to Shanghai between November 1938 and June 1941, the total number of arrivals by sea and land has been estimated at 1,374 in 1938; 12,089 in 1939; 1,988 in 1940; and 4,000 in 1941.

In 1939–1940, Lloyd Triestino ran a sort of "ferry service" between Italy and Shanghai, bringing in thousands of refugees a month—Germans, Austrians, and a few Czechs. Added to this mix were approximately 1,000 Polish Jews in 1941. Among these were the entire faculty of the Mir Yeshiva, some 400 in number, who with the outbreak of World War II in 1939, fled from Mir to Vilna and then to Keidan, Lithuania. In late 1940, they obtained visas from Chiune Sugihara, the Japanese consul in Kaunas, to travel from Keidan, already Soviet-occupied Lithuania, via Siberia and Vladivostok to Kobe, Japan. By November 1941 the Japanese moved this group and most of the others to the Shanghai Ghetto in order to consolidate the Jews under their control. Finally, a wave of more than 18,000 Ashkenazi Jews from Germany, Austria, and Poland immigrated to Shanghai; that ended with the Attack on Pearl Harbor by Japan in December 1941.

The Ohel Moshe Synagogue had served as a religious center for the Russian Jewish community since 1907; it is currently the Shanghai Jewish Refugees Museum. In April 1941, a modern Ashkenazic Jewish synagogue was built (called the New Synagogue).

Much-needed aid was provided by International Committee for European Immigrants (IC), established by Victor Sassoon and Paul Komor, a Hungarian businessman, and the Committee for the Assistance of European Jewish Refugees (CFA), founded by Horace Kadoorie, under the direction of Michael Speelman. These organizations prepared the housing in Hongkou, a relatively cheap suburb compared with the Shanghai International Settlement or the Shanghai French Concession. Refugees were accommodated in shabby apartments and six camps in a former school. The Japanese occupiers of Shanghai regarded German Jews as "stateless persons" because Nazi Germany treated them so.

== Life inside ==
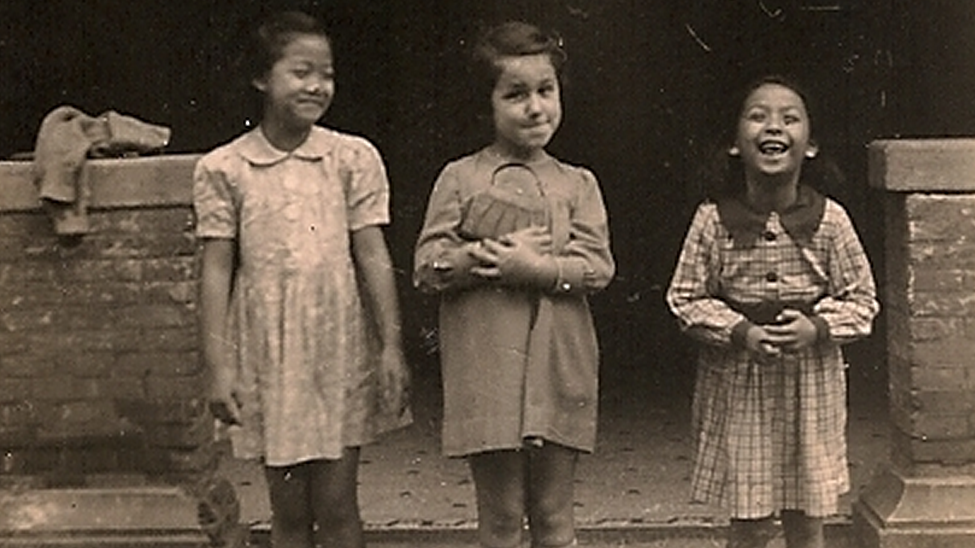
A Jewish girl and her Chinese friends in the Shanghai Ghetto, from the collection of the Shanghai Jewish Refugees Museum

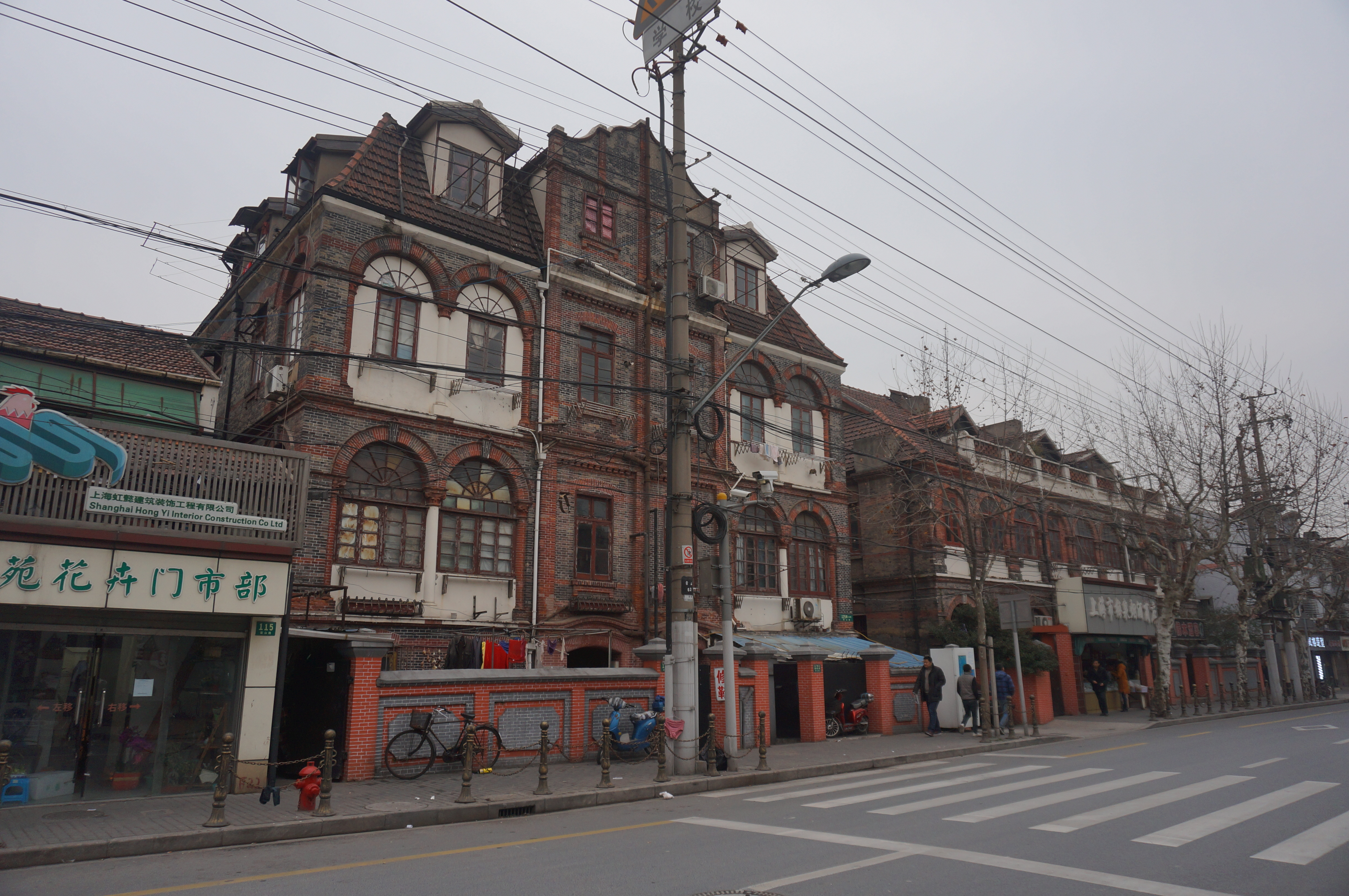
Former site of the American Jewish Joint Distribution Committee

The authorities were unprepared for massive immigration, and the arriving refugees faced harsh conditions in the impoverished Hongkou District: 10 per room (2 small beds per family), near-starvation, disastrous sanitation, and scant employment. Despite the conditions, most of the residents survived the war in relative safety, with the death rate far lower than the ghettos in Europe. According to the United States Holocaust Museum, compared to the "daily terrors endured by ghettoized Jews in Europe", Japan's treatment of the Jewish population in Shanghai was "relatively benign".

The Baghdadis and later the American Jewish Joint Distribution Committee (JDC) provided some assistance with the housing and food problems. Faced with language barriers, extreme poverty, rampant disease, and isolation, the refugees still transitioned from being supported by welfare agencies to establishing a functioning community. Jewish cultural life flourished: schools were established, newspapers were published, theaters produced plays, sports teams participated in training and competitions and even cabarets thrived.

There is evidence that some Jewish men married Chinese women in Shanghai. Although not numerous, “the fact that interracial marriages were able to take place among the relatively conservative Jewish communities demonstrated the considerable degree of cultural interaction between the Jews and the Chinese” in Shanghai.

=== After Pearl Harbor (1941–1943) ===
After Japanese forces attacked Pearl Harbor, the wealthy Baghdadi Jews, many of whom were British subjects, were interned with other British citizens, and American charitable funds ceased. As communication with the US was banned and broken, unemployment and inflation intensified and times got harder for the refugees.

JDC liaison Laura Margolis, who came to Shanghai, attempted to stabilize the situation by getting permission from the Japanese authorities to continue her fundraising effort and turned to the Russian Jews, who arrived before 1937 and were exempt from the new restrictions, for assistance.

== German requests, 1942–1944 ==
During a trial in Germany relating to the Shanghai Ghetto, Fritz Wiedemann reported that Josef Meisinger had told him that he got the order from Himmler to persuade the Japanese to take measures against the Jews. According to Wiedemann, Meisinger certainly could not have done this in the form of a command to the Japanese.

Since most Japanese were not antisemitic, Meisinger used their fear of espionage to achieve his goal. In fall 1942, he conferred with the head of the foreign section of the Japanese Home Ministry. Meisinger explained that he had orders from Berlin to give the Japanese authorities all the names of "anti-Nazis" among the German community. He explained that "anti-Nazis" were primarily German Jews, of whom 20,000 had emigrated to Shanghai. These "anti-Nazis" were always "anti-Japanese" too.

Later, a subordinate, the interpreter of Meisinger, Karl Hamel, reported to U.S. Army Counter Intelligence Corps (CIC) agents that the Japanese, after some consideration, believed in this thesis. According to Hamel, this led to a veritable chase of "anti-Nazis" and to the internment of many people. In response, the Japanese demanded from Meisinger to compile a list of all "anti-Nazis." As his personal secretary later confirmed, this list had already been prepared by Meisinger in 1941. After consulting with General Heinrich Müller in Berlin, it was handed over by Meisinger to the Japanese Home Ministry and to the Kempeitai at the end of 1942.

The list contained the names of all Jews with German passports in Japan. For the Japanese, this official document made clear that, in particular, the large number of refugees who had fled to Shanghai from 1937 onwards represented the highest "risk potential". So the proclamation of a ghetto was just a logical consequence of Meisinger's intervention. This way, Meisinger succeeded, despite the barely existing antisemitism of the Japanese, in achieving his goal: The internment of a large part of the Jews in the Japanese sphere of influence. For this attainment, he was promoted to Colonel of the police on 6 February 1943, despite the Richard Sorge affair. This information was kept secret by US authorities and was not used in civil proceedings of ghetto inmates to gain redress. That is why, for example, in the case of a woman who was interned in the ghetto, a German court came to the conclusion that even though there was a probability that Meisinger tried to encourage the Japanese to take action against Jews, the establishment of the ghetto in Shanghai was "solely based on Japanese initiative".

On 15 November 1942, the idea of a restricted ghetto was approved after a visit of Shanghai by Meisinger.

As World War II intensified, the Nazis stepped up pressure on Japan to hand over the Shanghai Jews. While the Nazis regarded their Japanese allies as "Honorary Aryans", they were determined that the Final Solution to the Jewish Question would also be applied to the Jews in Shanghai. Warren Kozak describes the episode when the Japanese military governor of the city sent for the Jewish community leaders. The delegation included Amshinover rabbi Shimon Sholom Kalish. The Japanese governor was curious and asked, "Why do the Germans hate you so much?". The rabbi successfully convinced him:

Without hesitation and knowing the fate of his community hung on his answer, Reb Kalish told the translator (in Yiddish): "Zugim weil wir senen orientalim—Tell him [the Germans hate us] because we are Orientals." The governor, whose face had been stern throughout the confrontation, broke into a slight smile. In spite of the military alliance, he did not accede to the German demand and the Shanghai Jews were never handed over.

"Residences, Businesses of City's Stateless Refugees Limited to Restricted Sector". (Shanghai Herald newspaper, 18 February 1943)

According to another rabbi who was present there, Reb Kalish's answer was "They hate us because we are short and dark-haired." Orientalim was not likely to have been said because the word is an Israeli academic term in modern Hebrew, not a word in classical Yiddish or Hebrew.

== Creation ==
On 18 February 1943, as a result of German pressure, the occupying Japanese authorities declared a "Designated Area for Stateless Refugees" and ordered those who arrived after 1937 to move their residences and businesses within it by 18 May, three months later. The stateless refugees needed permission from the Japanese to dispose of their property; others needed permission to move into the ghetto. About 18,000 Jews were forced to relocate to a two-square-kilometre (3/4 sq mi) area of Shanghai's Hongkou district, where many lived in group homes called "Heime".

The English version of the order read:

The designated area is bordered on the west by the line connecting Chaoufoong, Muirhead, and Dent Roads; on the east by Yangtzepoo Creek; on the south by the line connecting East Seward, Muirhead, and Wayside Roads; and on the North by the boundary of the International Settlement.

While this area was not walled or surrounded with barbed wire, it was patrolled and a curfew enforced in its precincts. Food was rationed, and everyone needed passes to enter or leave the ghetto.

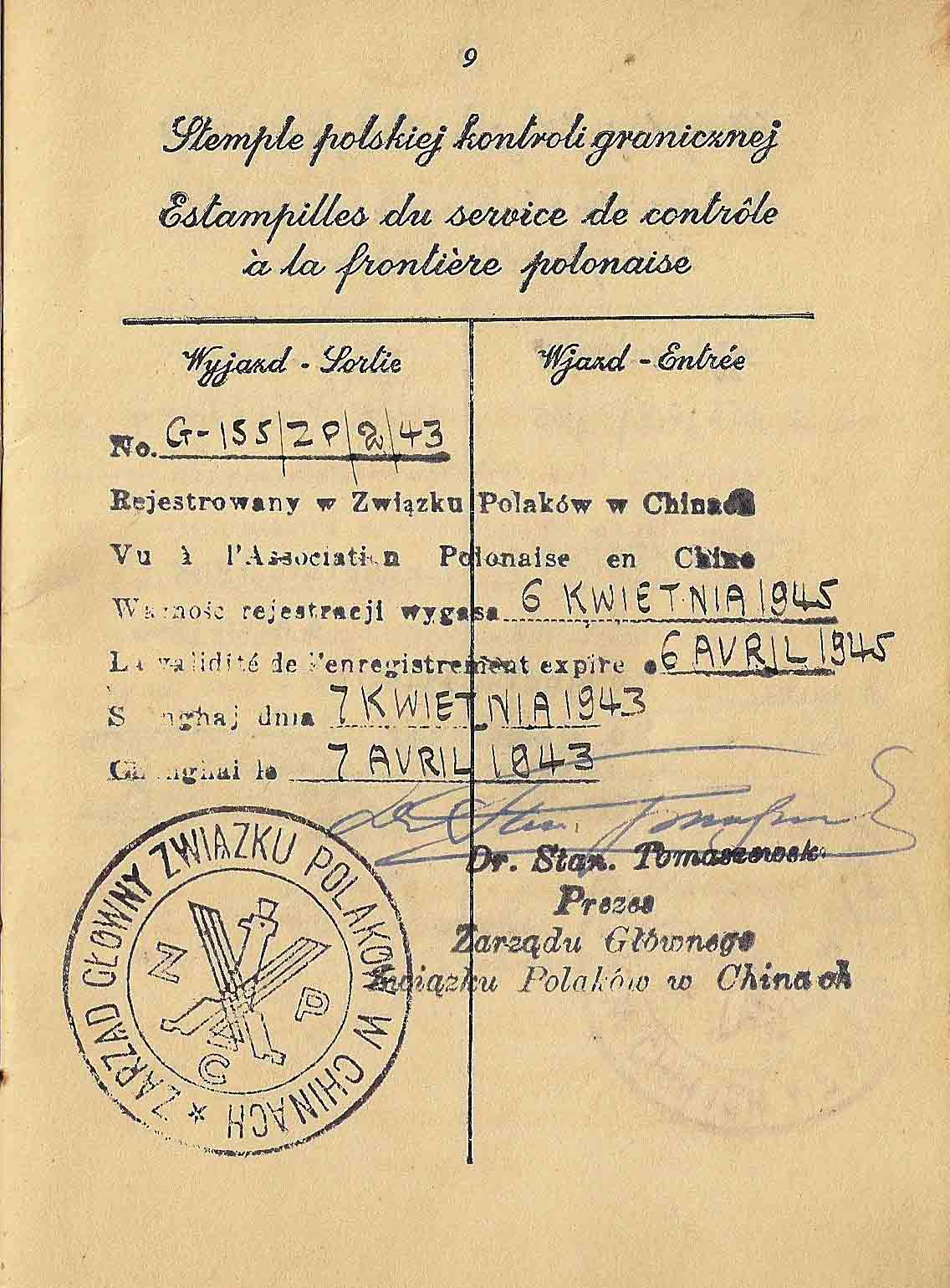
Polish Jew's passport registration inside the ghetto (1943)

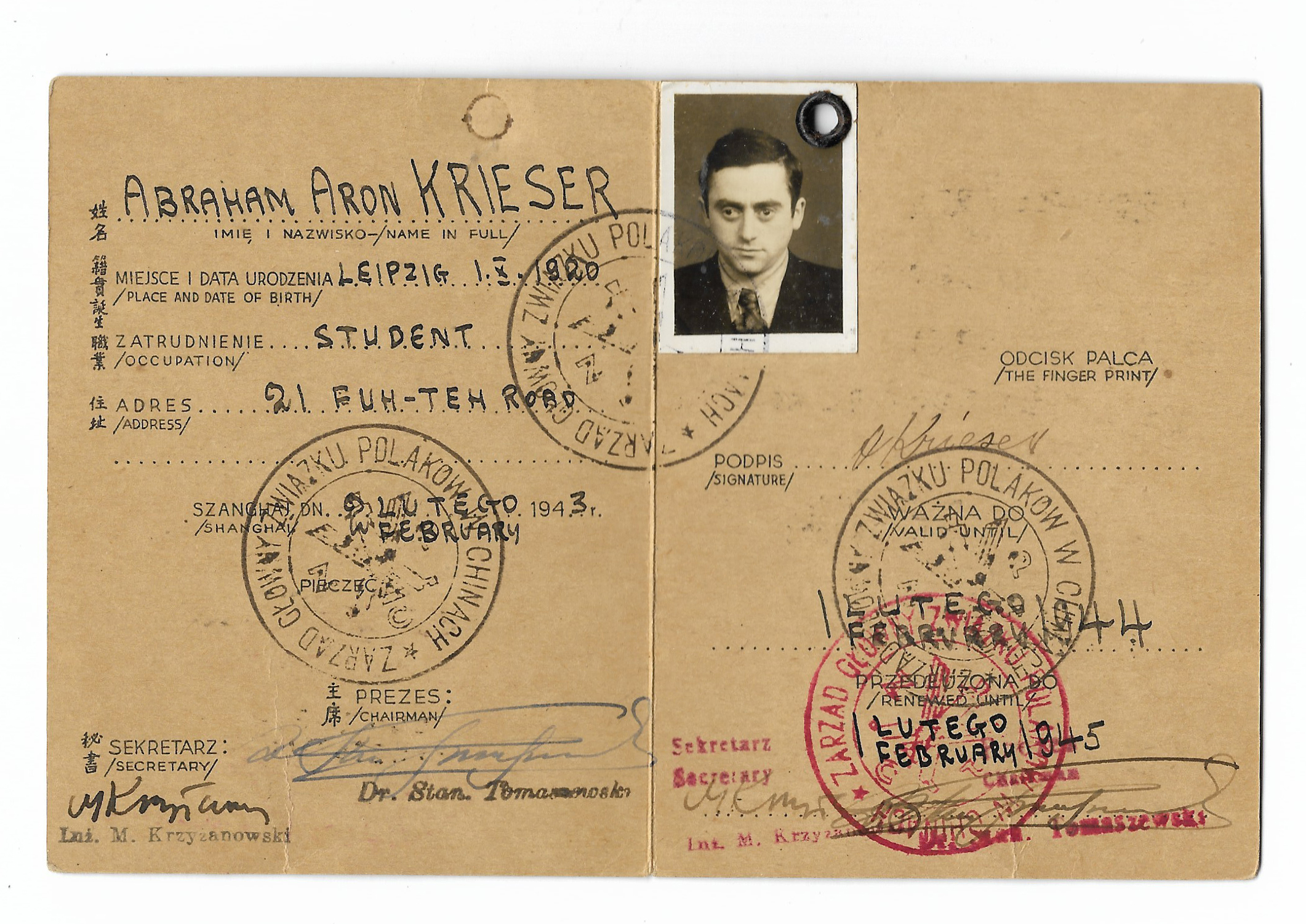
1942 Polish Association ID issued to a Jewish man living inside the ghetto.

The ghetto was administered by the Japanese Stateless Refugees' Affairs Bureau, with Kanoh Ghoya serving as vice-chief. Ghoya became notorious among refugees for his arbitrary and cruel treatment when issuing passes required to leave the restricted area. Self-proclaiming himself as "King of the Jews," he would arbitrarily deny passes, physically assault applicants, and demand humiliating acts from refugees seeking permission to leave the ghetto for work or medical care. His capricious behavior made obtaining essential passes a traumatic experience for many refugees.

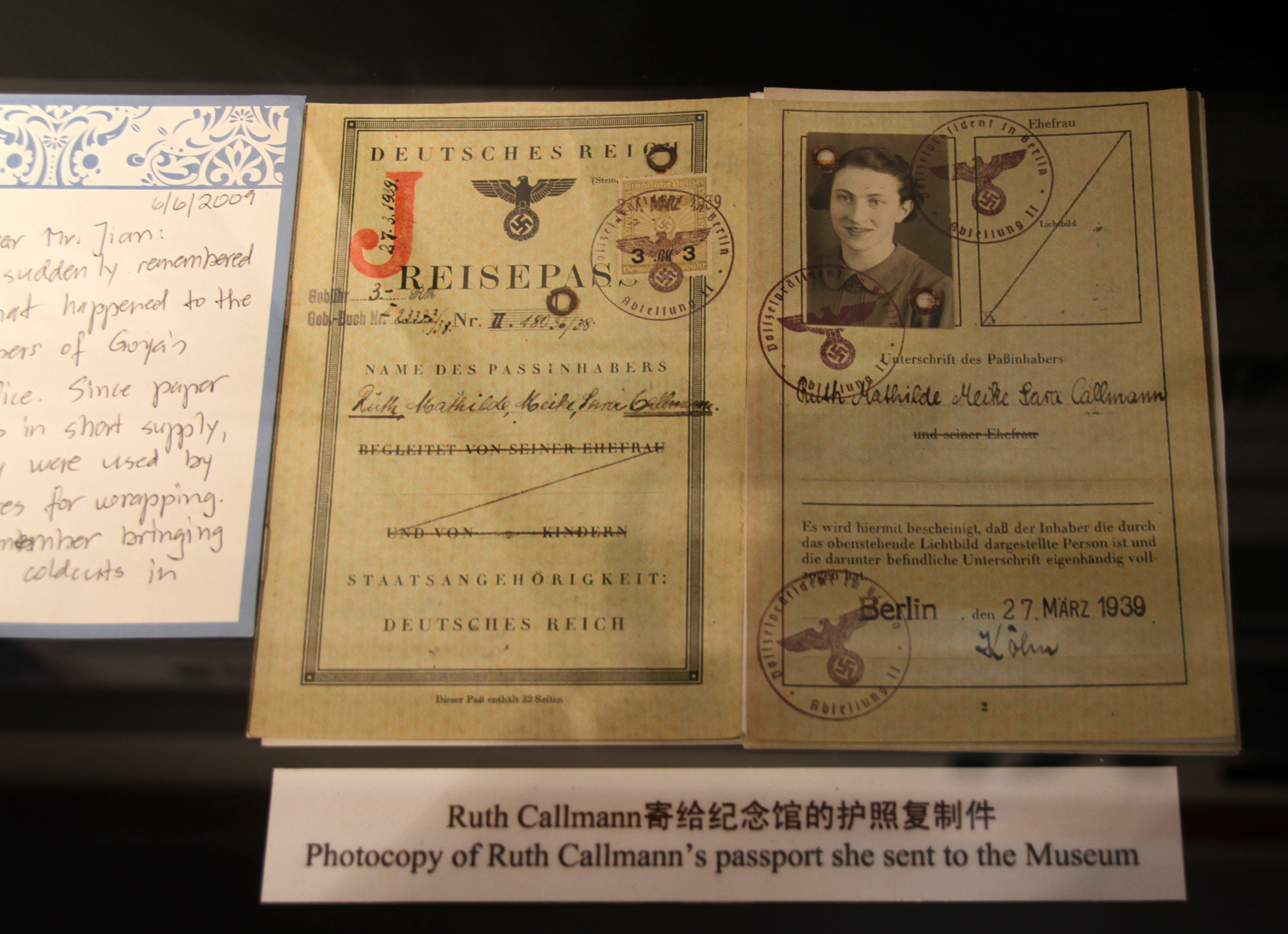
Passport of German citizen Ruth Callman, issued in Berlin on 27 March 1939. The red "J" stamp means Jewish.

According to Dr. David Kranzler,

Thus, about half of the approximately 16,000 refugees, who had overcome great obstacles and had found a means of livelihood and residence outside the 'designated area' were forced to leave their homes and businesses for a second time and to relocate into a crowded, squalid area of less than one square mile with its own population of an estimated 100,000 Chinese and 8,000 refugees.

The US air raids on Shanghai began in 1944. There were no bomb shelters in Hongkou because the water table was close to the surface. The most devastating raid started on 17 July 1945, and was the first attack that hit Hongkou. Thirty-eight refugees and hundreds of Chinese were killed in the 17 July raid.

The bombings by the US 7th Air Force continued daily until early August, when the atomic bomb was dropped on Hiroshima and the Japanese government surrendered shortly thereafter. Refugees in the ghetto improvised their own shelters, with one family surviving the bombing under a bed with a second mattress on top, mounted on two desks.

Some Jews of the Shanghai ghetto took part in the resistance movement. They participated in an underground network to obtain and circulate information and were involved in some minor sabotage and in providing assistance to downed Allied aircrews.

== After liberation ==
The ghetto was officially liberated on 3 September 1945. Soon after, the refugees left, primarily to live in Palestine, the US, Australia, Canada, and the Soviet Union, with a small amount going to Germany and Austria. There were 7,270 Central European Jewish refugees in Shanghai in 1947, 1,700 in 1949, and 21 in the 1960s.

=== Commemorations ===
Since the establishment of diplomatic relations between Israel and China in 1992, the connection between the Jewish people and Shanghai has been recognised in various ways. The Government of Israel bestowed the honor of the Righteous Among the Nations to Chiune Sugihara in 1985 and to Ho Feng Shan in 2001. In 2007, the Israeli consulate-general in Shanghai donated 660,000 Yuan, provided by 26 Israeli companies, to community projects in Hongkou District in recognition of the safe harbour provided by the ghetto.

The Shanghai Jewish Refugees Museum commemorates the experience of Jewish refugees. Israeli Prime Minister Benjamin Netanyahu visited the museum and praised Shanghai's historic role as a sanctuary for Jewish refugees.

A Jewish monument in Shanghai is located at Huoshan Park (formerly Rabin Park) in Hongkou District.

== Partial list of notable refugees in the Restricted Sector for Stateless Refugees ==
- Walter Abish, Austrian-born American author of experimental novels and short stories.
- Aaron Avshalomov, Russian composer.
- Abba Berman, Haredi rabbi, Rosh yeshiva.
- Charles K. Bliss, whose Chinese experience inspired him to create Blissymbols.
- David Ludwig Bloch, a German-born lithographer and painter.
- W. Michael Blumenthal, served as the U.S. Treasury Secretary.
- Morris Cohen, known by his nickname Two-Gun Cohen, he served as bodyguard and aide-de-camp to Sun Yat-sen, eventually becoming a Chinese general.
- Shaul Eisenberg, who founded and ran the Eisenberg Group of Companies in Israel.
- Kurt Rudolf Fischer, professor at University of Pennsylvania and University of Vienna.
- Eduard Glass, Austrian chess master.
- Leo Hanin, leader of Shanghai Betar.
- Otto Joachim, German composer.
- Shimon Sholom Kalish, Hasidic rebbe of Amshinov–Otvotsk.
- Yisrael Mendel Kaplan, Haredi rabbi, served as Reb Mendel.
- Ruth Landers, American entrepreneur, film and television producer, talent manager and mother to actors Audrey Landers and Judy Landers.
- Yechezkel Levenstein, Haredi rabbi, served as Mashgiach Ruchani.
- Francis Mankiewicz, Canadian film director, screenwriter and producer.
- Peter Max, American pop artist.
- Michael Medavoy, a Hollywood executive at Columbia, Orion and TriStar Pictures.
- Rene Rivkin, Australian financier.
- Jakob Rosenfeld, more commonly known as General Luo, who spent nine years overseeing health care and who served as the Minister of Health in the 1947 Provisional Communist Military Government of China under Mao Zedong.
- Hermann Schieberth, photographer in Vienna.
- Otto Schnepp, professor at University of Southern California.
- Chaim Leib Shmuelevitz, Haredi rabbi, served as Rosh yeshiva of the Mirrer Yeshiva in Shanghai (1941–1947), and in Jerusalem (1965–1979).
- John G. Stoessinger, Distinguished Professor of Global Diplomacy at the University of San Diego.
- George Szekeres, professor of mathematics, University of New South Wales.
- Sigmund Tobias, professor City University of New York, Fordham University, studied in Mir Yeshiva in Shanghai, President of Northeastern Educational Research Association 1975, President Division of Educational Psychology, American Psychological Association 1987, Distinguished Faculty Fellow US Navy R&D Center San Diego summers 1991–1997, published extensively in professional outlets.
- Laurence Tribe, professor, Harvard Law School, Carl M. Loeb University Professor.
- George Zames, a control theorist and professor at McGill University, Montreal, Quebec.

== See also ==
- Abraham Kaufman, a prominent Zionist in China
- An Investigation of Global Policy with the Yamato Race as Nucleus (1943)
- History of the Jews in China
- History of the Jews in Japan
- Jewish settlement in the Japanese Empire and Fugu Plan, a Japanese plan to bring Jewish refugees to Manchukuo (1934, 1938)
- MS St. Louis (1939)
- Japan and the Holocaust
- Nanking Safety Zone
- Kanoh Ghoya

== Films ==
- Empire of the Sun. Directed by Steven Spielberg. 154 min. 1987.
- A Jewish Girl in Shanghai. Directed by Wang Genfa and Zhang Zhenhui. 80 min. 2010.
- The Port of Last Resort: Zuflucht in Shanghai. Documentary directed by Joan Grossman and Paul Rosdy. 79 min. 1998.
- Shanghai Ghetto. Documentary by Dana Janklowicz-Mann and Amir Mann. 95 min. 2002.
- Ye Shanghai. 62 min. Film and live audio-visual performance by Roberto Paci Dalò created in Shanghai in 2012. Commissioned by Massimo Torrigiani for SH Contemporary - Shanghai Contemporary Art Fair and produced by Davide Quadrio and Francesca Girelli.
- Harbor from the Holocaust. Documentary by Violet Du Feng. 56 min. 2020.
- Exile Shanghai. German/Israeli film. Documentary by Ulrike Ottinger. 275 mins. 1997
