= Shimon Sholom Kalish =

Polish rabbi (1882–1954)

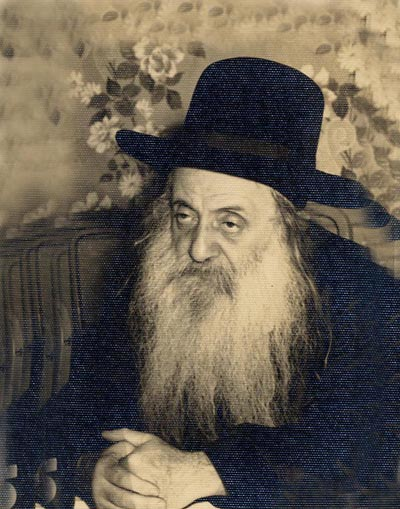
Shimon Sholom Kalish

Shimon Sholom Kalish (1882–1954) was the Hasidic Rebbe of Amshinov–Otvotsk.

== Biography ==
He was the son of Menachem Kalish (1860-1918), the second Rebbe of Amshinov (Hasidic dynasty) in Mszczonów (Yiddish: אמשינאוו Amshinov), Poland, and the brother of Yosef Kalish, Rebbe of Amshinov (d. 1935). When Menachem died in 1918, Kalish, became rebbe in Otwock. He was a major driving force behind the exodus of thousands of young men in Mir, Kletsk, Radin, Novhardok, and other yeshivas, via Russia and Japan to Shanghai at the outbreak of World War II. By the time Shanghai came under Japanese control, it held 26,000 Jews (Shanghai Ghetto). It is said that when the Mir Yeshiva was in Shanghai and they did not know what time Sabbath was so they asked Kalish he ״answered that they should keep three days of sabbath just in case״.

As World War II intensified, the Nazis stepped up pressure on Japan to hand over the Shanghai Jews. Warren Kozak describes the episode when the Japanese military governor of the city sent for the Jewish community leaders. The delegation included Kalish. The Japanese governor was curious: "Why do the Germans hate you so much?"

"Without hesitation and knowing the fate of his community hung on his answer, Reb Kalish told the translator (in Yiddish): "Zugim weil mir senen orientalim — Tell him the Germans hate us because we are Oriental." The governor, whose face had been stern throughout the confrontation, broke into a slight smile. In spite of the military alliance, he did not accede to the German demand and the Shanghai Jews were never handed over."

After the war, Kalish moved to the United States. Upon his passing in 1954, his son Yerachmiel Yehuda Myer Kalish (1901-1976) accompanied his father's body to Tiberias in Israel, and remained there.
