= A Jewish Girl in Shanghai =

2010 Chinese animated family film

- Theatrical release poster
- Directed by: Wang Genfa; Zhang Zhenhui
- Written by: Wu Lin
- Produced by: Wang Tianyun; Ren Zhonglun; Cai Hongzhuan; Shi Bixi; Wu Pei
- Starring: Cui Jie; Zhao Jing; Ma Shaohua
- Music by: Shi Jiayang
- Production companies: Shanghai Animation Film Studio; Shanghai Film Group Corporation
- Release date: May 2010
- Running time: 80 minutes
- Country: China
- Language: Mandarin Chinese

A Jewish Girl in Shanghai (Chinese: 犹太女孩在上海) is a 2010 Chinese animated family film written by Wu Lin and based on his graphic novel of the same name. It is directed by Wang Genfa and Zhang Zhenhui, and voiced by Cui Jie, Zhao Jing and Ma Shaohua.

Set mainly in and around the Shanghai Ghetto in Japanese-occupied Shanghai during the Second World War, the film tells the story of three children. Rina and her younger brother Mishalli are Jewish refugees who escaped Europe but are without their parents. A-Gen is a Chinese orphan boy who meets Rina and helps her and her brother to survive. The children form strong friendships and have adventures as they try and fend off the Japanese army occupying the city, and their allies, the Nazis. In the background, the Second Sino-Japanese War takes place, while the children must face the uncertainty that concerns the fate of Rina and Mishalli's parents in Europe.

Well received in China and internationally, A Jewish Girl in Shanghai has been heralded as the first animated Chinese film to address the Holocaust, and has been described as "China's first homegrown Jewish film". The film has been nominated for awards in China and Israel, and has been considered an important step towards improving China's relations with Israel and intercultural relations between the Chinese and Jewish communities.

== Plot ==
An old blue eyed lady arrives in modern-day Shanghai, holding an old locket.

Back in the 1940s, the children Rina and Mishalli, European Jews sought refuge within Shanghai Ghetto, having escaped the Nazis in their home Germany. A-Gen, was a Chinese boy who sold bread for a living. Rina gave her locket in exchange of food. A-Gen tries to find Rina to return her locket.

She was welcomed upon by A-Gen to his home, as he was raised by his father's friend, who was once alongside his father, fought the Japanese, in which A-Gen's father died.

Together, the three children live in Shanghai, until a collaborator reveal their location to the Japanese Army. A-Gen's guardian held and allowed himself to be caught by the soldiers.

1945, the Japanese surrendered. A-Gen sees his friend Rina one last time as she was taken to the ship back to Europe.

Rina is the old woman from the beginning, trying to search for A-Gen, who came as an old man.

== Historical background ==
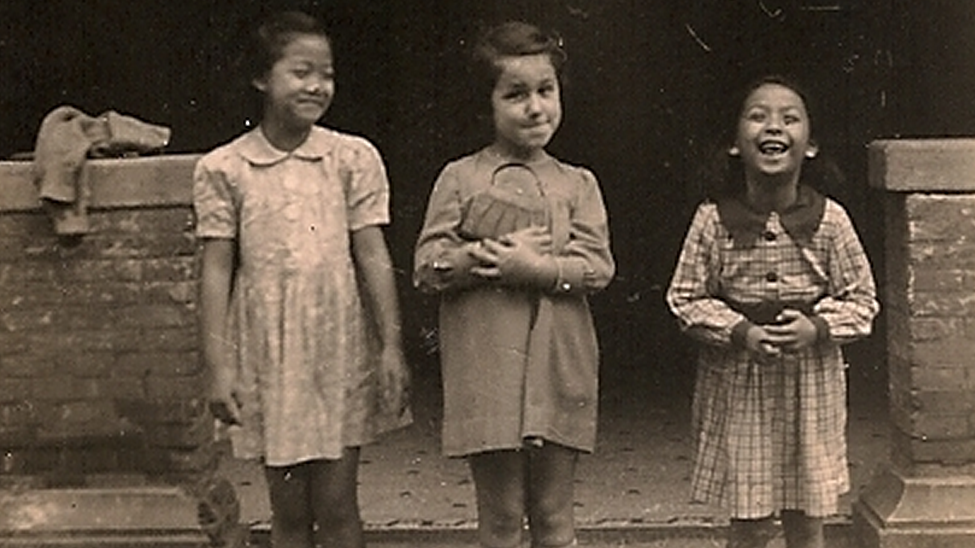
A real Jewish girl in Shanghai with her Chinese friends, from the collection of the Shanghai Jewish Refugees Museum

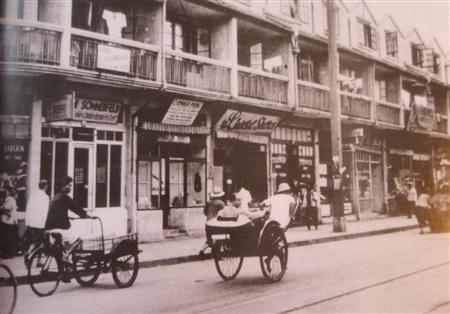
The Shanghai Ghetto in 1943

During the Second World War, approximately 20,000 Jewish refugees fleeing German-occupied Europe were given an area of approximately one square mile in the Hongkou District of Shanghai by the Japanese Empire, designated the Restricted Sector for Stateless Refugees, one of the poorest and most overcrowded areas of the city. Shanghai had previously had a small population of Baghdadi Jews and Russian Jews, the latter mostly having fled the Russian Empire as a result of anti-Jewish pogroms.

The new Ashkenazi Jews that immigrated to Shanghai began arriving from 1933, firstly German Jews following the Nazi Party's rise to power. Despite the cultural differences they faced, and restrictions imposed by the Japanese under Nazi pressure, the Jews of Shanghai survived the war unharmed, as the Japanese refused to hand them over to the Germans.

Following the end of the Second World War, many Jews who had sought refuge in Shanghai returned to Europe or decided to settle in countries with much larger Jewish populations, such as the United States and Palestine. Most of the Jews that chose to stay in Shanghai left shortly afterwards as a result of the resumption of the Chinese Civil War, and by the late 1950s very few Jews remained in Shanghai. As a result of Chinese economic growth in recent years, however, the city's Jewish population has grown to around 1,500 in 2010. This compares to a Jewish population of fewer than 100 around 20 years before.

== Production ==
A widely used promotional still from the film depicting Rina and A-Gen. Note the Star of David that appears on the pocket watch.

Wu, a former history teacher, first became interested in the history of Shanghai's Jews, obscure to both Jews and Chinese alike, in 2005. To mark the 60th anniversary of the end of the Second World War, many newspapers and magazines in Shanghai published the stories of Jewish refugees, seeing parallels between the Jewish and Chinese peoples' oppression by the Germans and Japanese respectively. Wu had previously lived in Los Angeles, and he based the character of Mishalli on Jerry Moses, a Jewish American friend, originally from Breslau (now Wrocław, Poland). Jerry Moses obtained a safe haven in Shanghai. Moses and other Jewish friends helped Wu to learn about Jewish religious practices. Wu has stated that his main reason for making the film was to let children know about what really happened, and to promote the story and the history so that people all over the world can learn from it.

The story was originally conceived for adults, but Wu decided to aim the film at children in the hope that the film could influence the future generation. Glenn Timmermans, the organiser of the Macau Jewish Film Festival, has stated that he believes the film's intended age group is between around eight and fourteen years, though he notes its wider appeal. One of the film's characters, a talking monkey, has been noted as one of the more child-orientated features of the film.

Wu first created a A Jewish Girl in Shanghai as a graphic novel, published in 2008 by East China Normal University Press. The graphic novel has been described as a "great success" by Wu, selling 4,000 copies in the first six months since its release, though, as it was only published in English, its Chinese market was naturally limited. Wu has stated that a Hebrew version of the graphic novel is under consideration.

In 2009, Wu began work on a film adaptation to bring the work to a broader audience in China. The film, produced using 35 mm film, is, unlike the graphic novel, in Mandarin Chinese, and was developed by the Shanghai Film Group Corporation and the Shanghai Animation Film Studio. The film score was composed by Shi Jiayang.

== Release ==
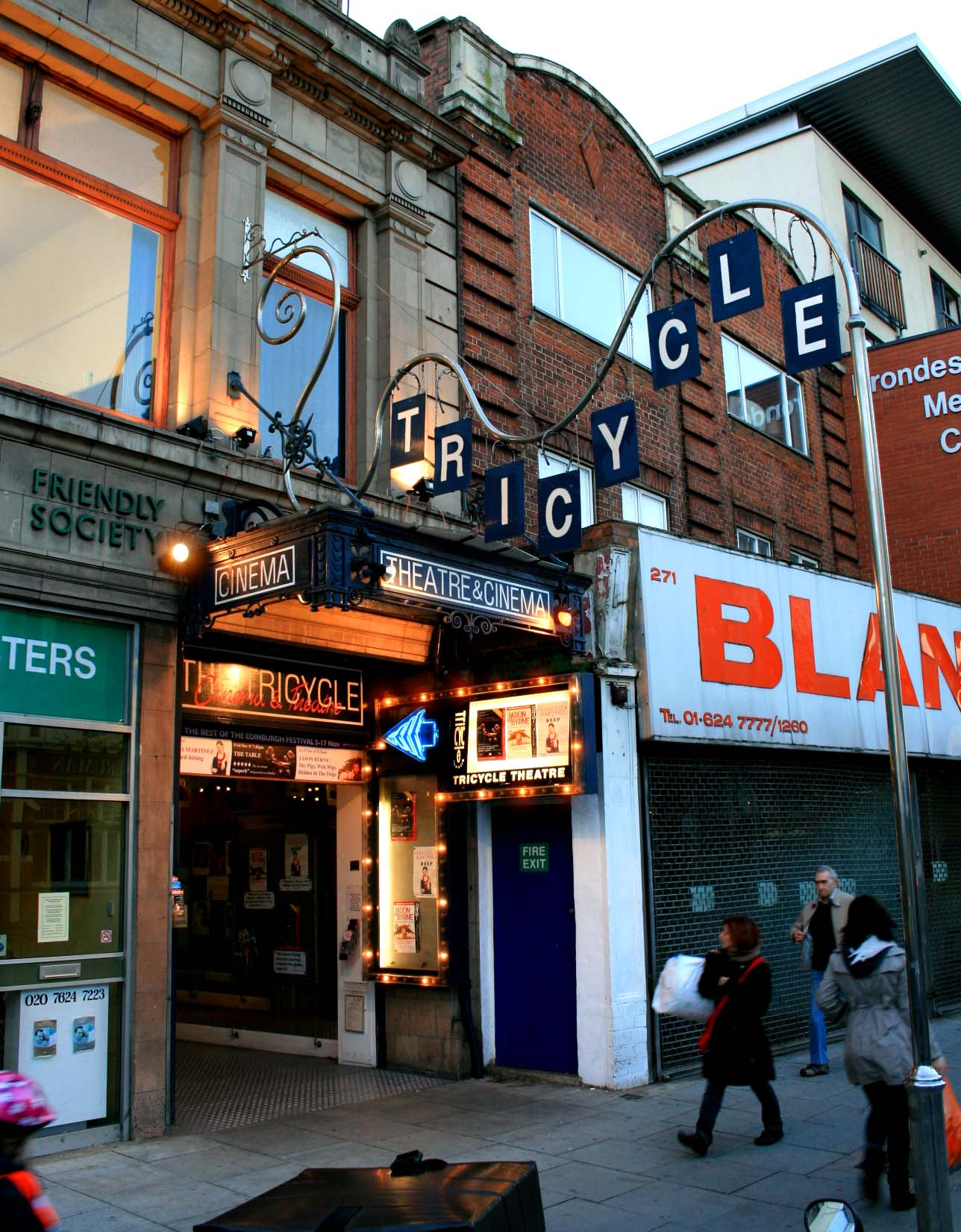
The Tricycle Theatre in Kilburn, London, the site of the film's UK premiere.

A Jewish Girl in Shanghai made its world premiere in Shanghai in May 2010. The film began showing across China from 28 May. After a month following the film's general release, it was being shown in 200 Chinese cinemas. When it was first shown in China, it was in front of 700 school pupils, who, according to Wu, "laughed and cried several times". He described the emotional impact of the film as "very rare for an animated film".

The film subsequently made its premiere in Macau on November 14, 2010 at the Cultural Centre of the University of Macau, as part of the 1st Macau Jewish Film Festival. The Hong Kong premiere took place a week later, on November 21, at the Jewish Community Centre on Robinson Road, as part of the 11th Hong Kong Jewish Film Festival.

The film's Israeli premiere took place in July 2010, when it was shown as part of the 27th Jerusalem Film Festival on July 13 and 14. The film was well received by the Israeli audience.

The British premiere took place in November 2010, when it was shown at the Tricycle Theatre in Kilburn, London. The film was first shown on November 20 as part of the 14th UK Jewish Film Festival. The film's subtitles in English were noted as containing a few mistranslations and mistakes, including the anachronistic use of the word "badass".

=== Reception ===
The critical reception to A Jewish Girl in Shanghai has been generally positive. The film was nominated for the Jewish Experience Award at the Jerusalem Film Festival, becoming the first Chinese film nominated for that award. At the China International Animation and Digital Arts Festival in Changzhou, Jiangsu, China, the film received the Golden Cartoon Award Best Chinese Film Prize.

The film's animation has been widely praised, being described as "beautifully drawn" with "breathtaking traditional animation" and as being "artfully created with traditional animated imagery".

The sensitive treatment of the Holocaust has also been commended: "The fresh perspective of the main characters means that the events of the times are freed from clichéd depictions of the Holocaust and the viewer is able to draw their own conclusions."

Some criticism has been directed towards the historical grounding of the film. One flashback scene of the film, set in 1936, sees Rina and Michaili, in what appears to be an alpine setting in Europe, escaping being bombed by Nazi planes, despite the date preceding the aerial warfare of the Second World War. Wu himself has said that the film is "both true and untrue" in that it is a composition of fiction and history; "the main characters were all based on real prototypes...I can't promise it's 100% accurate, but I think it fits the background of the time."

The clothing of the Jews was notably inaccurate, especially in Europe, where the orthodox Jewish mother is wearing slacks and a T-shirt. The film also minimizes the Japanese role in saving most of these Jews. Most famously, 6,000 Lithuanian Jews were saved by Japanese Vice-Consul Chiune Sugihara in Vilna, many of whom live through the war in Shanghai.

=== Intercultural relations ===
A Jewish Girl in Shanghai has been praised by commentators for being a positive step towards improving Chinese–Jewish and Chinese–Israeli relations at a time when there is growing interest in China about Jewish life.

Wu has stated that only by remembering the past can friendship for the future be built, declaring that while "the friendship between the Jewish people and the Chinese people is only a spray in the long river of world history", it is "extremely meaningful because it took place in the hard times of anti-Fascism."

== Sequel ==
In an interview with Asian Jewish Life, Wu revealed he was planning to write a sequel to A Jewish Girl in Shanghai, stating his intentions that the second animated work would tell the as-yet unseen story of Rina and Mishalli's father. Wu explained the reason for this on the basis that he wrote "the front of the face and now need to write from the back."

== See also ==
- Shanghai Ghetto (film)
