= Sigmund Tobias =

American psychologist and educator

- Born: November 26, 1932; Berlin, Germany
- Died: January 31, 2023 (aged 90)
- Occupations: Psychologist; educator
- Known for: Contributions to educational psychology and research

Sigmund Tobias (November 26, 1932 – January 31, 2023) was an American psychologist and educator known for his significant contributions to the fields of psychology and educational research.

== Early life and education ==
Sigmund Tobias was born in Berlin, Germany to Orthodox Jewish Polish parents. Following the events of Kristallnacht, his father attempted to flee to Belgium but was captured and sent to Dachau concentration camp. At that time, Jews could still be released if they could prove they would leave Germany, so his mother arranged for the family to travel to Shanghai, China, on an ocean liner. At that time, Shanghai was partially occupied by Japan and included an "International Settlement" and a "French Concession" governed by the Shanghai Municipal Council. Tobias lived in Shanghai until 1948, where he recounted his experiences and intellectual development in his 1999 memoir Strange Haven: A Jewish Childhood in Wartime Shanghai. He underwent religious training at the Kadoorie School before transferring to the Orthodox Mir Yeshiva. Tobias emigrated to the United States in 1948, with his parents joining him the year later.

Tobias earned his Bachelor of Arts degree in school psychology from the City College of New York in 1955. While there, he met Lora Sussman on a blind date, and they married the same year. He obtained his PhD in clinical psychology from Columbia University in 1960.

== Academic career ==
Following a brief period teaching at Brooklyn College, Tobias joined the faculty at the City University of New York (CUNY), where he served as a professor of psychology and education until 1997. Although his doctorate was in clinical psychology, he became an internationally recognized leader in educational psychology. Tobias taught and conducted research at State University of New York, Columbia University, City University of New York, Fordham University and the U.S. Navy Summer Faculty Research Program. He dedicated the majority of his academic career to the faculty at City College before joining Fordham University as a distinguished scholar in the Educational Psychology graduate program. Subsequently, he served as a Distinguished Research Scientist at the Institute for Urban and Minority Education at Teachers College, Columbia University, and was also an Eminent Research Professor at the University at Albany. Throughout his career, he published over 150 scholarly articles, writing extensively in the areas of instructional psychology, educational research, and educational technology.

Tobias was actively involved in several professional organizations. American Educational Research Association, the American Psychological Association, and the Association for Psychological Science. He held various leadership roles within them, and served as president of the American Psychological Association’s Division for Educational Psychology in 1987, and of the Northeastern Educational Research Association. He contributed as an editor or editorial board member for numerous major journals in psychology and education.

Tobias's research centered on cognition, learning, and instruction, with a particular focus on practical challenges in school learning. He investigated general learning theory and the specific demands of instructional methods in areas such as reading, mathematics, and game-based learning. His work aimed to bridge theoretical principles of human learning with practical applications in educational settings.

== Memoir ==
Tobias revisited Shanghai as an adult, where he was invited to lecture at the Shanghai Institute of Education in 1988. This visit inspired his 1999 memoir, Strange Haven: A Jewish Childhood in Wartime Shanghai, in which he compares the city to his memories from 40 years earlier. To ensure accuracy, he shared the manuscript with twelve friends from Shanghai. Ernest G. Heppner, in his review published in the journal Shofar, noted that since these friends were also children at the time, they likely relied on their parents' impressions, which contributed to several historical inaccuracies in the book. Nevertheless, Tobias's account of everyday life in Hongkew, the district where many refugees, including a ghetto established in 1943, settled, is regarded as one of the most detailed narratives published to date. Told from a child's perspective, it reflects both his experiences and those of his parents, despite the limitations of a six-year-old's viewpoint. Heppner highlighted Tobias's "amazing memory for minute details and fluid style of writing," which make the memoir both interesting and informative. The book is also the first to address the significant divide between Polish and Central European (German/Austrian/Czech) refugees, detailing the Poles' animosity towards fellow refugees, their desire for isolation, and the preferential treatment they received from the local Russian Jewish community.

== Personal life and death ==
Tobias had two daughters, Susan and Rochelle, and two grandchildren. On January 31, 2023, he died at his home in Sarasota, Florida following a brief illness.

== Selected works ==
=== Books ===
- Tobias, Sigmund (1999). Strange Haven: A Jewish Childhood in Wartime Shanghai. University of Illinois Press. p. 162. ISBN 978-0252024535.
- Sigmund Tobias; Thomas M. Duffy (2009). Constructivist Instruction: Success or Failure?. Routledge. ISBN 978-1135847937.
- Tobias, Sigmund (2011). Fletcher, J. D. (ed.). Computer Games and Instruction. Information Age Publishing. ISBN 978-1-6173-5409-0.

=== Articles ===
- Tobias, Sigmund (January 1968). "Dimensions of Teachers' Attitudes Toward Instructional Media". American Educational Research Journal. 5 (1): 91–98. doi:10.3102/00028312005001091.
- Tobias, Sigmund (June 1973). "Review of the Response Mode Issue". Review of Educational Research. 43 (2): 219–230. doi:10.3102/00346543043002193.
- Tobias, Sigmund; Hedl, John J.; Towle, Nelson J. (April 1974). "Response Time and Test Anxiety". Psychological Reports. 34 (2): 479–482. doi:10.2466/pr0.1974.34.2.479. PMID 4820507.
- Tobias, Sigmund (March 1976). "Achievement Treatment Interactions". Review of Educational Research. 46 (1): 61–74. doi:10.3102/00346543046001061.
- Tobias, Sigmund (March 1994). "Interest, Prior Knowledge, and Learning". Review of Educational Research. 64 (1): 37–54. doi:10.3102/00346543064001037.
- Fletcher, J. D.; Tobias, Sigmund; Wisher, Robert A. (March 2007). "Learning Anytime, Anywhere: Advanced Distributed Learning and the Changing Face of Education". Educational Researcher. 36 (2): 91–96. doi:10.3102/0013189X07300034.
- Tobias, Sigmund; Fletcher, J. D. (2012). "Reflections on "A Review of Trends in Serious Gaming"". Review of Educational Research. 82 (4): 543–550. doi:10.3102/0034654312450190.
- Owston, Ronald D. (2011). "Computer Games and the Quest to Find Their Affordances for Learning". Educational Researcher. 41 (3): 105–106. doi:10.3102/0013189X12439231.
- Tobias, Sigmund (June 2013). "Strengthening Connections Between Education and Training". Educational Researcher. 42 (5): 284–286. doi:10.3102/0013189X13478651.
