= Chaskel Besser =

Rabbi Chaskel Besser
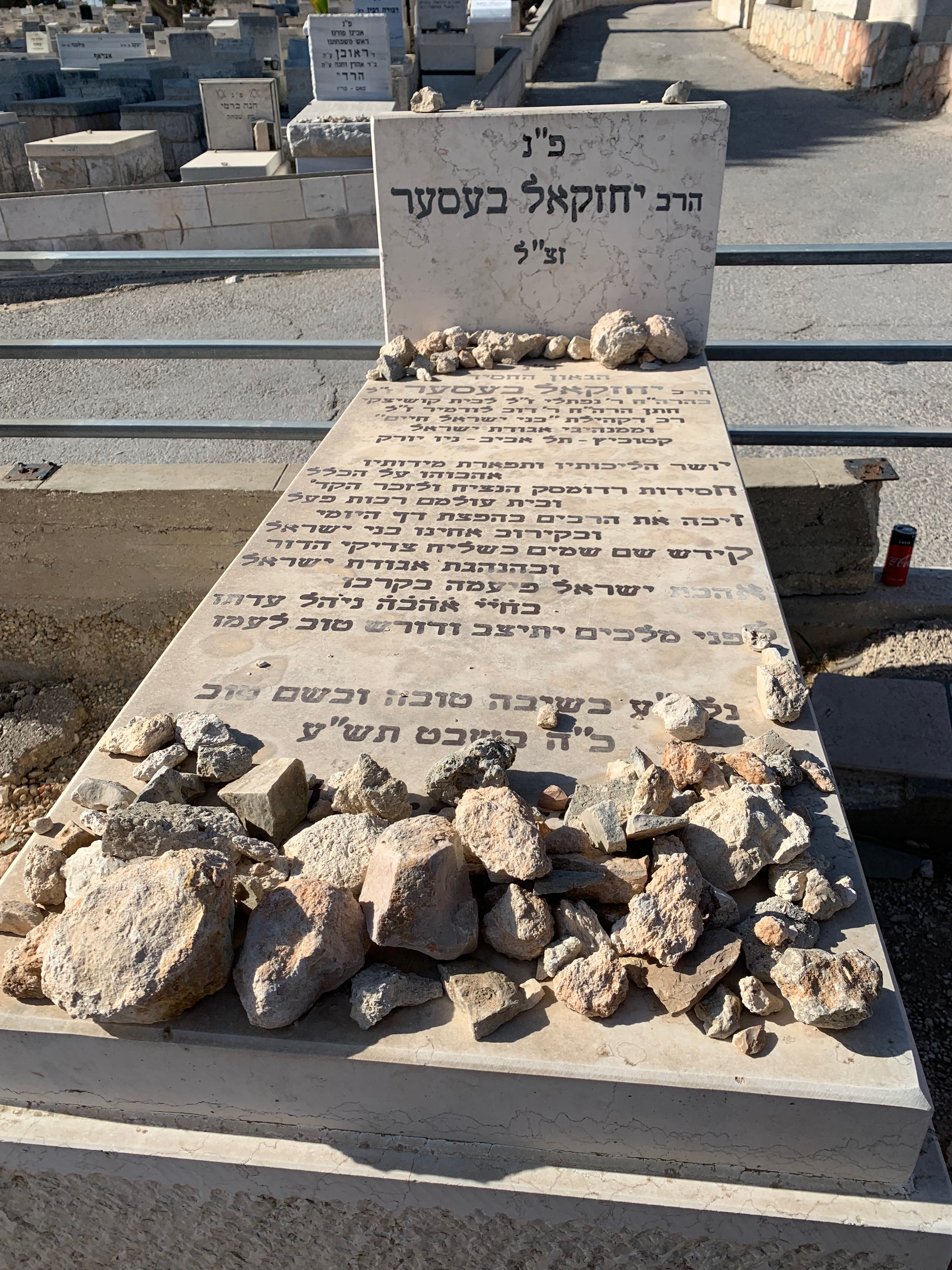
- Born: Chaskiel Koszycki; February 12, 1923; Katowice, Poland
- Died: February 9, 2010 (aged 86); New York City, United States
- Known for: International Chairman of Daf Yomi Commission, Chairman for Poland, Ronald S. Lauder Foundation

Chaskel Besser (born Chaskiel Koszycki; February 12, 1923 – February 9, 2010) was an Orthodox rabbi for much of the 20th and early 21st century, and a member of Radomsk Chassidic movement. He lived in Manhattan, New York. He was born in Katowice, Poland and lived there until the dual Nazi and Soviet invasion of Poland in 1939. He was affiliated with Congregation B’nai Israel Chaim in New York.

His original family name, Koszycki, was changed by his father while the family still lived in Poland. His father, a successful businessman, and close associate of the Radomsker Rebbe, moved to pre-war Palestine after his identity was stolen and his family threatened by gangsters. After Besser escaped Poland and Europe in 1939, he was reunited with his family in Tel Aviv. He came to the United States in 1949, together with members of his family.

He is the subject of a book written by Warren Kozak called The Rabbi of 84th Street. He appeared in the television program The Jews of New York talking about the experience of Jews in pre-World War II Germany.

Besser was the principal spiritual leader in the renewal of Polish Jewish life. He traveled there frequently to teach until not long before his death. Toward the end of the communist era, he helped find Jews and rebuild Jewish life in Poland by partnering with Ronald S. Lauder. This partnership established Besser as the Director of the Ronald S. Lauder Foundation for Poland.

He found Rabbi Michael Schudrich, currently the Chief Rabbi of Poland, to move Poland to establish Jewish communal life on behalf of the Lauder Foundation. In addition to his work to restore Jewish communal life, he also helped restore many Jewish holy sites in Poland, negotiating with the Polish government to preserve the legacy of Polish Jewry before the war. One of those Jewish cemeteries is in Oświęcim, where his maternal grandparents are buried.

Among his children are Rabbi Shlomo Besser, a rabbi and teacher active for the cemeteries of Eastern Europe and Aliza Grund, President of the women's division of the Agudah. His two other children are Mrs. Debbie Rosenberg of London, England and Rabbi Naftali Besser of Brooklyn, New York. Yisroel Besser, author of Warmed By Their Fire, and many other biographies, is his grandson.

He was a member of the Presidium of Agudas Yisroel of America, a member of the Vaad Hapoel Haolami of Agudas Yisroel World Organization, founding Chairman of the Daf Yomi Commission, and one of the prominent longtime leaders of the Agudah. He spoke and welcomed guests on September 28, 1997 and March 2, 2005 at the large Siyum HaShas organized by Agudah at Madison Square Garden and during previous years.

As founding chairman of the Agudas Yisroel Daf Yomi Commission, Rabbi Besser worked to make the daily Talmud study program known to the masses. He funded the publication of a pocket-sized Talmud to make it easier to transport and study.

Besser's records and archives contributed to understanding the life of Rav Shlomo Chanoch HaKohen Rabinowitz, the Grand Rabbi of Radomsk, murdered in 1942 by the Germans.

He also located the Rebbe's final resting place in the Warsaw Cemetery and built a new Ohel.

Rabbi Yonah Bookstein, former Director of The Ronald S. Lauder Foundation in Poland, and currently a rabbi of Pico Shul, is one of his students. In 1992, Besser sent Bookstein to Poland to work at the Ronald S. Lauder Foundation Summer Camp with Rabbi Schudrich.
