= Paul Komor =

Paul Komor was a Hungarian businessman.

He had lived in Shanghai and was trustee of the Komor Charity Fund and Hungarian Relief Fund. Komor held the title of Honorary Consul General for Hungary in Shanghai in 1938-1941. He co-founded the International Committee for the Organization of European Refugees in China (I.C.), which was established in August 1938 and financed by Victor Sassoon.

The IC provided housing, jobs and financial assistance for the 18,000 German, Austrian and other refugees who came into Shanghai. The IC also helped in facilitating entry. It issued international passports to the Jews of Shanghai whose Nazi passports were confiscated or no longer valid.

== See also ==
- Shanghai Ghetto
