= Masami Uno =

Japanese writer (born 1942)

Masami Uno (宇野 正美, Uno Masami; born 1942) is a Japanese writer. Many of his works have been described as antisemitic, and related to Holocaust denial.

== Biography ==
He studied economics at Osaka Metropolitan University. After 11 years as a high school teacher, he established 中東問題研究センター (Chuto mondai kenkyu center; "The Middle-East Problem Research Institute") in 1975.

In 1986, he published a book named "ユダヤが解ると世界が見えてくる" (Yudaya ga wakaruto sekai ga mietekuru; "To understand Jews is to see the world clearly"), This book is based on the infamous antisemitic text The Protocols of the Learned Elders of Zion. According to Uno, the Ashkenazim are "fake Jews", and are in charge of the world.

Uno writes that Japanese are the descendants of the Ten Lost Tribes of Israel, and so will eventually defeat "fake Jews."

In 1989, he established 株式会社リバティ情報研究所 (Kabushikigaisha Liberty Joho Kenkyujo; "The Liberty Information Research Institute, inc.").

== See also ==
- Japanese-Jewish Common Ancestor Theory
