= Tadeusz Romer =

Polish diplomat and politician

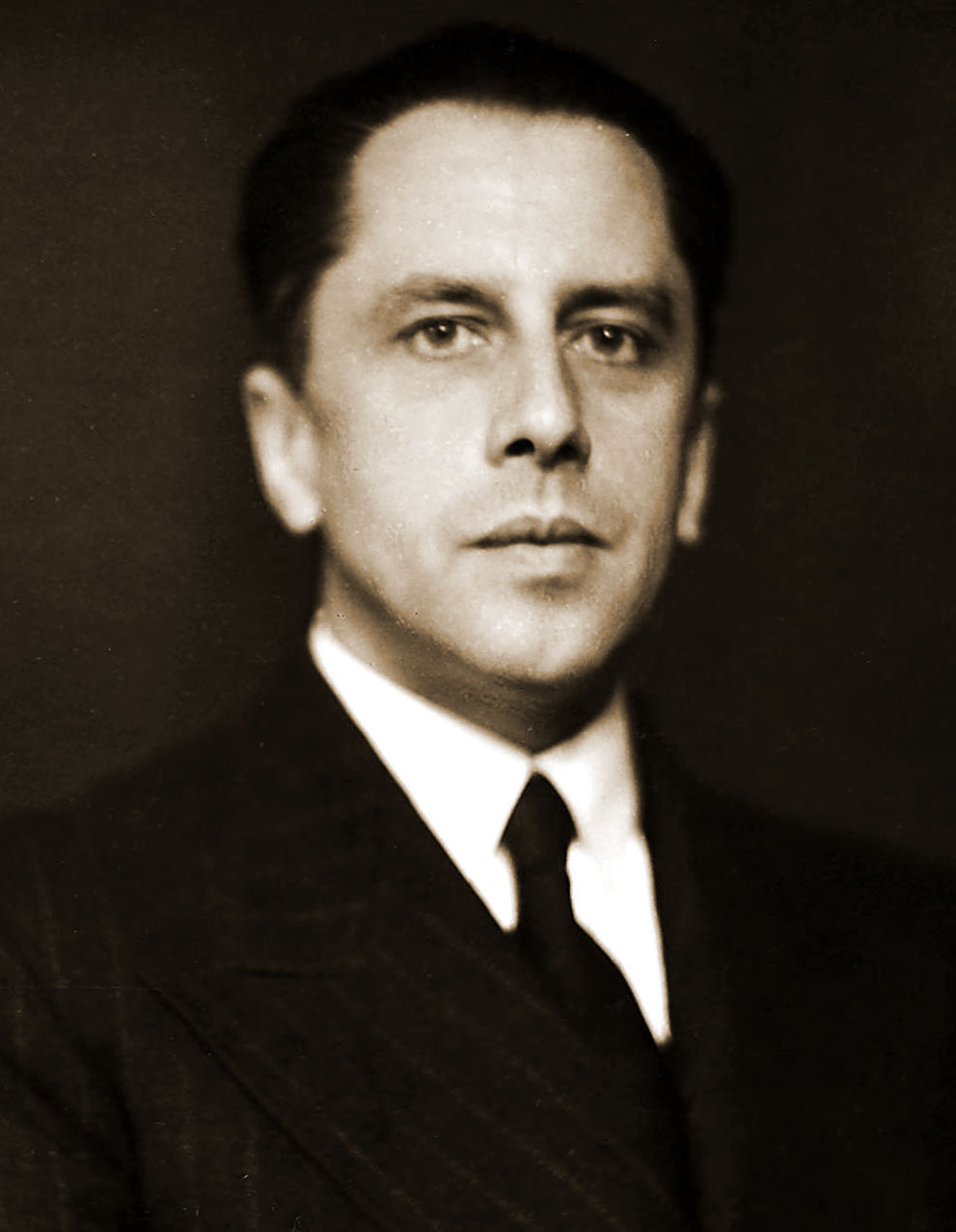

Personal details
- Born: 6 December 1894 Antanašė near Rokiškis, Kovno Governorate, Russia
- Died: 23 March 1978 (aged 83) Montreal, Quebec, Canada

Tadeusz Ludwik Romer (6 December 1894 - 23 March 1978) was a Polish diplomat and politician.

== Life and career ==
He was a personal secretary to Roman Dmowski in 1919. Later he joined the Polish Ministry of Foreign Affairs, he served as Polish ambassador to Italy, Portugal, Japan (1937–1941) and the Soviet Union (1942–1943). Then he was the Minister of Foreign Affairs of the Polish Government in Exile (1943–1944). After the war, he settled in Canada, where he lectured at McGill University.

From August 1940 to November 1941, he got transit visas in Japan, asylum visas to Canada, Australia, New Zealand, Burma, immigration certificates to Palestine, and immigrant visas to the United States and some Latin American countries for two thousand Polish-Lithuanian Jewish refugees, who arrived into Kobe, Japan, and Shanghai Ghetto, China.

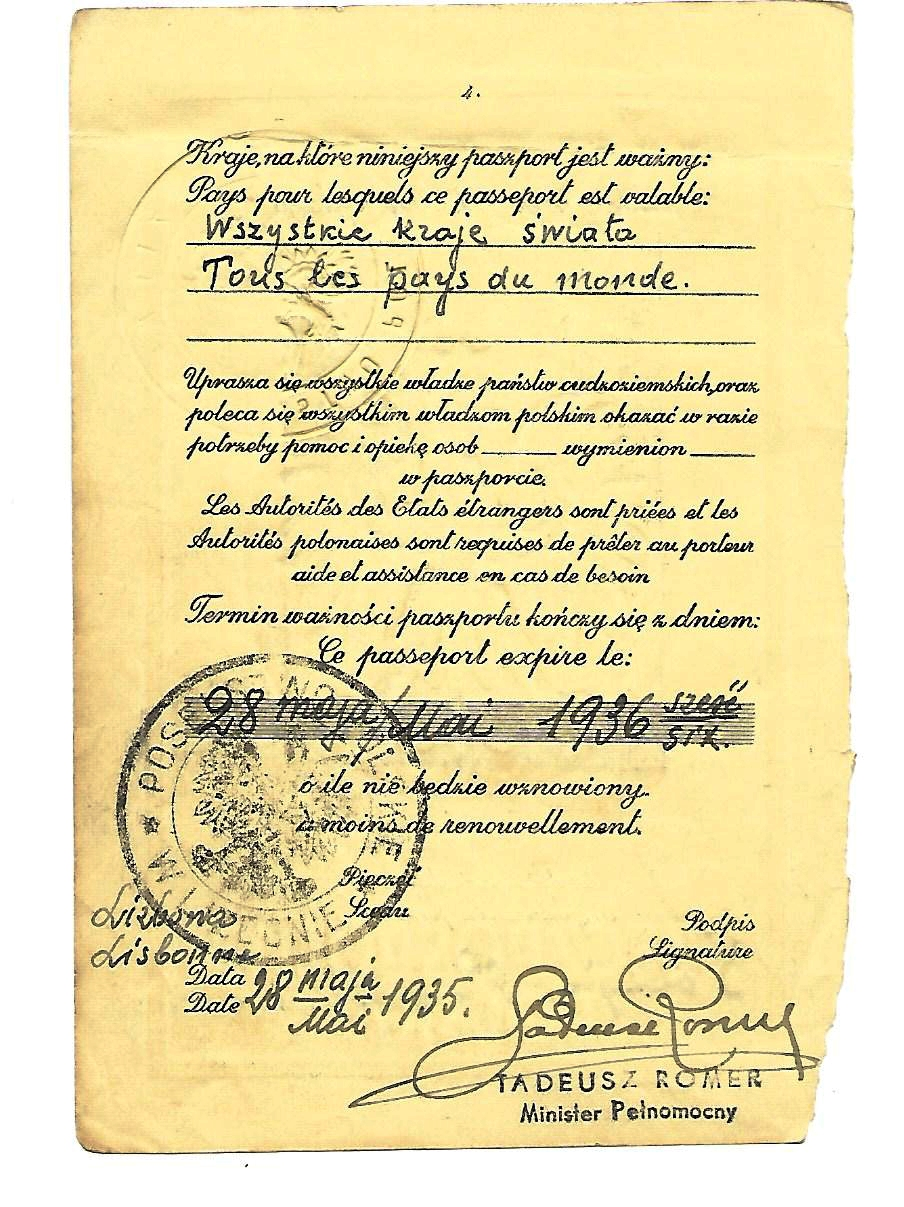
A page taken from a 1935 Polish passport issued to the wife of a diplomat posted to Lisbon. The page is signed by the ambassador to Portugal Tadeus Romer.

Romer worked as the head Polish ambassador in Japan until the Polish embassy in Japan closed in July 1941. Romer’s work helped fund Polish Jewish refugees and ensure visas into Japan. He created a ‘Polish Committee to Aid the Victims of War’ and appointed his wife, Zofia to be president of the committee. They worked to financially support Jewish communities in Yokohama and Kobe by campaigning in far eastern countries for funding.

Romer’s position became increasingly important after the United States closed off immigration. Romer’s Polish ambassador position was one of the only beacons of hope for Jewish refugees stuck in Japan. Romer negotiated with Polish allies for immigration options for refugees. For example, Canada offered multiple opportunities for refugees interested in contributing to the Allied war effort.

By October 1942, Romer was exiled from Japan but found a new position as a Polish consultant working in Shanghai. Romer expected the job to be temporary. However, after Pearl Harbor the routes from Shanghai to the USSR became extremely dangerous to trek, hence he couldn’t relocate in the USSR. Romer suggested an analytical report of the Polish War refugees living in Shanghai. In June 1942 Romer planned to record the gender, age and political parties of Polish refugees in Shanghai. The main goal of the 40-page report was finished was to analyze the communities’ resources, activities and figure future plans for the Polish refugees. This report was published in August 1942 and gave refugees a strong sense of Polish pride which inspired many refugees to resist moving into stateless Shanghai Ghetto that were enforced by the Japanese Government.

In August 1942 Romer embarked on a prisoner exchange to East Africa. He used this exchange as an escape route for some Polish refugees.

== See also ==
=== Archives ===
There is a Tadeusz Romer fonds at Library and Archives Canada. The archival reference number is R4804.
