= Ho Feng-Shan =

Chinese diplomat (1901–1997)

- 何鳳山
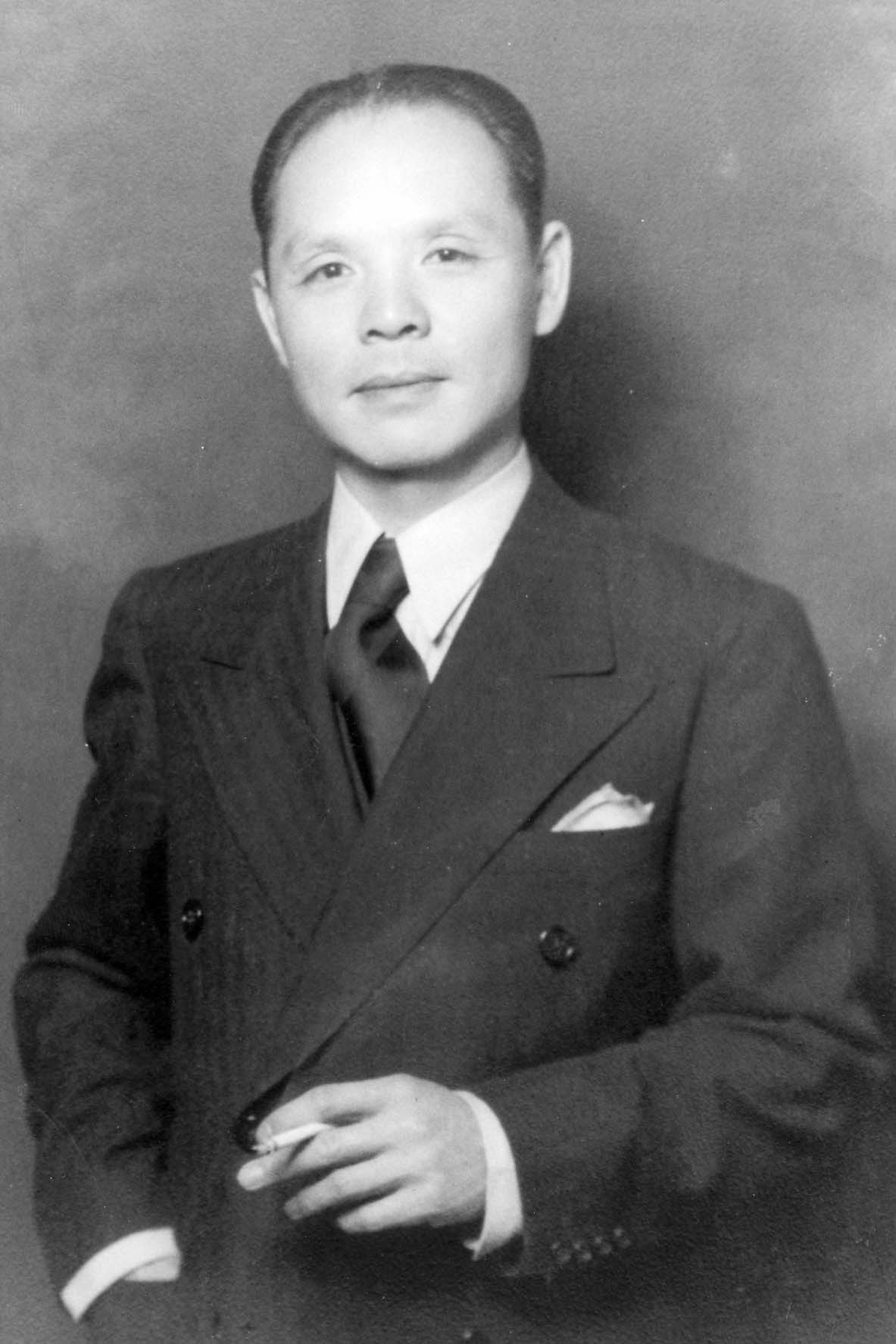
- Ho in the 1930s
- Born: September 10, 1901; Yiyang, Hunan, China
- Died: September 28, 1997 (aged 96); San Francisco, California, United States
- Education: Ludwig-Maximilians-Universität München
- Occupations: Diplomat, writer
- Political party: Kuomintang

Ho Feng-Shan
- Traditional Chinese: 何鳳山
- Simplified Chinese: 何凤山
Transcriptions
Standard Mandarin
- Hanyu Pinyin: Hé Fèngshān
- Wade–Giles: Ho2 Feng4-shan1

Ho Feng-Shan (Chinese: 何鳳山; September 10, 1901 – September 28, 1997) was a Chinese diplomat and writer for the Republic of China. When he was consul-general in Vienna during World War II, he risked his life and career to save "perhaps tens of thousands" of Jews by issuing them visas, disobeying the instruction of his superiors. It is known that Ho issued the 200th visa in June 1938, signed the 1906th visa on October 27, 1938, and was recalled to China in May 1940. Ho died in 1997 and his actions were recognized posthumously when the Israeli organization Yad Vashem in 2000 awarded Ho Feng-Shan the title "Righteous Among the Nations".

== Early life ==
Ho Feng-Shan was born on September 10, 1901, in Yiyang, Hunan Province, Qing-era China. His father died when Ho was seven years old. A diligent and hard-working student, he managed to enter the Yali School in the provincial capital of Changsha and later Yale-in-China University. He attended the Ludwig-Maximilians-Universität München in 1929 and received his doctorate in political economics in 1932.

== Before World War II ==
In 1935, Ho started his diplomatic career within the Foreign Ministry of the Republic of China. His first posting was in Turkey. He was appointed First Secretary at the Chinese legation in Vienna in 1937. When Austria was annexed by Nazi Germany in 1938, and the legation was turned into a consulate, Ho was assigned the post of Consul-General.

After the Kristallnacht in 1938, the situation became rapidly more difficult for the almost 200,000 Austrian Jews. The only way for Jews to escape from Nazism was to leave Europe. In order to leave, they had to provide proof of emigration, usually a visa from a foreign nation, or a valid boat ticket. This was difficult, however, because at the 1938 Évian Conference 31 countries (out of a total of 32, which included Canada, Australia, and New Zealand) refused to accept Jewish immigrants. The only country willing to accept Jews was the Dominican Republic, which offered to accept up to 100,000 refugees. Acting against the orders of his superior Chen Jie (陳介), the Chinese ambassador to Berlin, Ho started to issue transit visas to Shanghai, under Japanese occupation except for foreign concessions. Twelve hundred visas were issued by Ho in only the first three months of holding office as Consul-General.

At the time it was not necessary to have a visa to enter Shanghai, but the visas allowed the Jews to leave Austria. Many Jewish families left for Shanghai, whence most of them would later leave for Hong Kong and Australia. Ho continued to issue these visas until he was ordered to return to China in May 1940. The exact number of visas given by Ho to Jewish refugees is unknown. It is known that Ho issued the 200th visa in June 1938, and signed the 1906th visa on October 27, 1938. How many Jews were saved through his actions is unknown, but given that Ho issued nearly 2,000 visas only during his first half year at his post, the number may be in the thousands.

== After the war ==
After the Communist victory in 1949, Ho followed the Nationalist government to Taiwan. He later served as the ambassador from Republic of China (Taiwan) to other countries, including to Egypt, Mexico, Bolivia, and Colombia.

Ho retired in 1973, but was denied a pension by the ROC government on the grounds, common then, that he had been subpoenaed and refused to cooperate with Diplomatic Services, and had not properly accounted for a small sum in an embassy expense account. These charges are now widely believed to have been politically motivated. The ROC government has never exonerated him, as there were many diplomats leaving their posts without authorization. He did not report to work, and was terminated without a pension. This was the policy when tens of embassies were closed. A shadow was cast over his later years by impeachment by Taipei's Committee on the Discipline of Public Functionaries for having allegedly misappropriated funds when he was ambassador to Colombia in 1970. Ho maintained the charges were concocted by a subordinate he had refused to recommend for promotion.

Upon his retirement, Ho settled in San Francisco, California, where he acquired United States citizenship. In 1986, he returned to Mainland China and visited his alma mater in Changsha for the school's 80th anniversary. Ho also wrote a memoir titled My Forty Years as a Diplomat (外交生涯四十年), which was published in 1990. His son Monto Ho produced an abridged English translation in 2010.

== Death ==
Ho died on September 28, 1997, in San Francisco at the age of 96. He was survived by his son, Monto Ho (何曼德; Hé Màndé, 1927–2013), a Chinese-American professional in microbiology, virology, and infectious diseases; and by his daughter, journalist Manli Ho (何曼禮; Hé Mànlǐ).

== Legacy ==
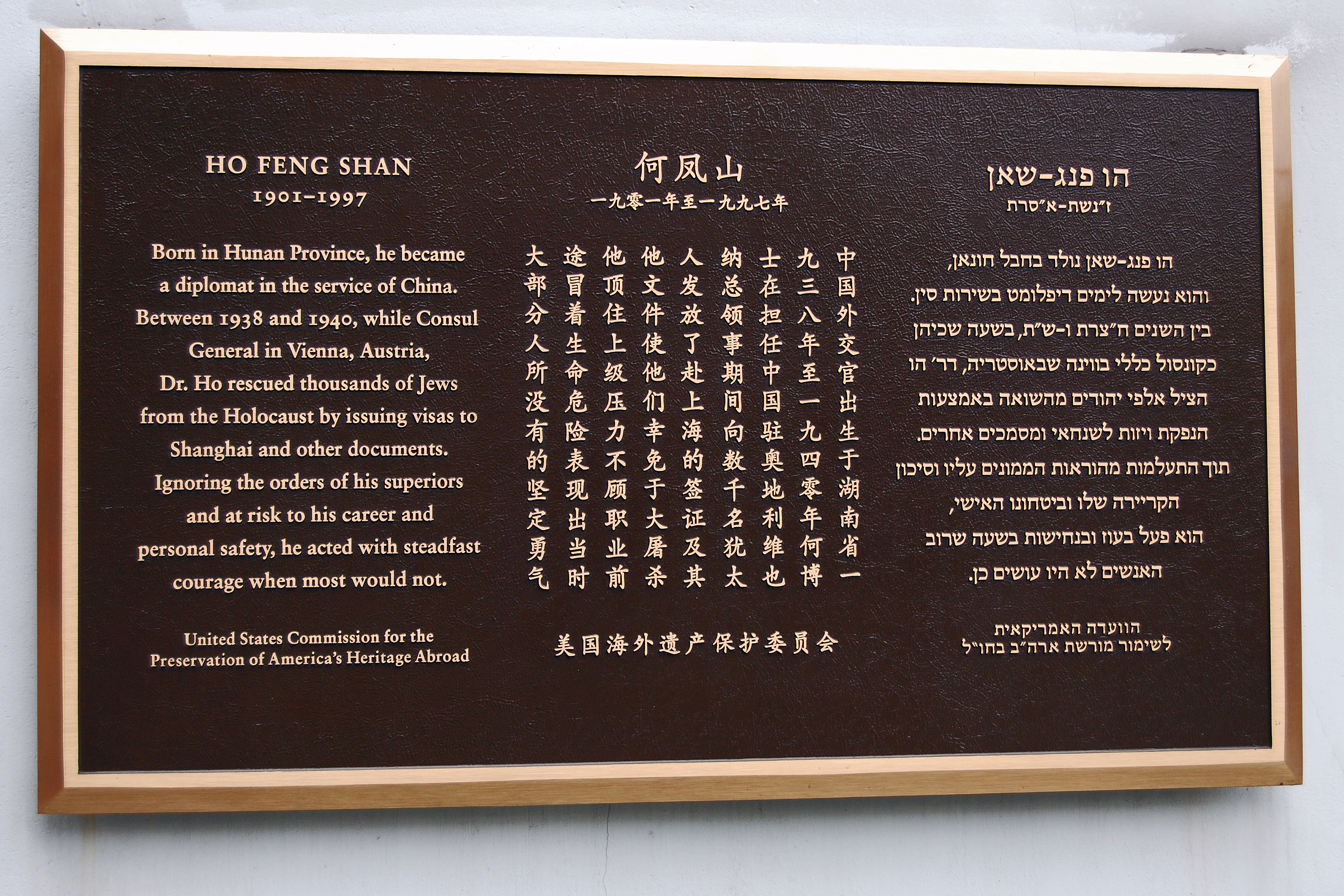
Memorial plaque dedicated to Ho Feng Shan at the Jewish Refugees Museum in Shanghai. This was the final destination for many of the thousands of Jews whose lives Ho had saved.

Ho's actions in Vienna went unnoticed during his lifetime, save for a black mark in his personnel file for disobeying orders. They were finally recognized, posthumously, when he was awarded the title Righteous Among the Nations by the Israeli organization Yad Vashem at a ceremony in 2001 and honored by Boys Town Jerusalem in 2004. On September 10, 2015, Taiwanese president Ma Ying-jeou awarded a posthumous citation to Ho for his service and presented his daughter a certificate of appreciation alongside Israeli government representatives.

His time in Vienna was controversially fictionalized in Weina Dai Randel's 2023 novel, Night Angels.

== See also ==
- Raoul Wallenberg
- Jan Zwartendijk
- Chiune Sugihara
- Tadeusz Romer
- Ten Green Bottles (book)
- Fugu Plan
- History of the Jews in China
- List of individuals and groups assisting Jews during the Holocaust
- Shanghai ghetto
- Oskar Schindler
- Paul Grüninger
- Nicholas Winton
