= Laura Margolis Jarblum =

First female overseas representative of the American Jewish Joint Distribution Committee

- Born: Laura Leah Margolis; October 19, 1903; Constantinople, Ottoman Empire (now Istanbul, Turkey)
- Died: September 9, 1997 (aged 93); Brookline, Massachusetts, United States
- Other names: Laura Margolis Jarblum
- Occupation: Social worker
- Movement: American Jewish Joint Distribution Committee

Laura Margolis Jarblum (1903–1997) was the first female overseas representative of the American Jewish Joint Distribution Committee (JDC) and the JDC's first female Country Director.

== Life ==
Laura Leah Margolis was born October 19, 1903, in Constantinople (now Istanbul). Her father, Herman Margolis, was a halutz and agronomist and her mother Cecilia was the daughter of Dr. Solomon Schwartz, the personal physician to the Sultan of the Ottoman Empire. Herman Margolis moved to Dayton, Ohio in 1907 and Cecilia, Margolis and her younger brother, Otto, joined him in 1908, eventually settling in Cleveland, Ohio. Margolis received her Bachelor of Science from Ohio State University in 1926 and a professional degree in social work from the School of Applied Social Sciences at Western Reserve University in Cleveland in 1927. In the 1930s, Margolis worked for various Jewish social service organizations, including the Jewish Social Services in Cleveland, Jewish Social Service Association in New York City and the Jewish Welfare Society in Buffalo, NY.

== Wartime career with the Joint Distribution Committee ==
In January 1939, Margolis became the first female field agent of the American Jewish Joint Distribution Committee when Cecilia Razovsky of the National Refugee Service, an agency associated with the JDC, hired her to go to Cuba. In Cuba, she worked closely with American consular officials to help the approximately 5,000 refugees who had arrived from Europe, mostly Germany and Austria. When the MS St. Louis with its 900 passengers was approaching Havana harbor in May 1939, Margolis tried to find a port of entry in either Cuba, the United States or Canada, but the ship was forced to return to Europe.

In light of Margolis’ overall success in Cuba, officials from the United States State Department requested that the JDC send her to Shanghai in May 1941 in order to assist United States' consular officials. Of the approximately 20,000 Jewish refugees from Germany and Austria then in Shanghai, around 8,000 refugees received at least one meal each day from JDC soup kitchens. In the months before the December 1941 attack on Pearl Harbor and the Japanese occupation of Shanghai, Margolis modernized the soup kitchens, making them more efficient and better able to serve the refugee community. Margolis was interned as an enemy alien by the Japanese from February 1943 through September 1943, when she was released as part of a prisoner exchange. Even during her internment, she ensured that the soup kitchens remained open.

Margolis returned to the United States in December 1943, where she found out for the first time about the extent of the extermination of the Jews in Europe and the existence of the concentration camps. She insisted that she be sent to Europe, although JDC officials were hesitant to send a woman into an active war zone. She arrived in Lisbon in March 1944 and then traveled to Spain, where she was active in arranging a home for children smuggled over the Pyrenees Mountains from France. She then traveled to Sweden, where she organized sending relief supplies from Stockholm to Theresienstadt and Bergen-Belsen concentration camps. She traveled to liberated Belgium in January 1945, where she was the JDC representative in Belgium and where she first encountered concentration camp survivors returning from Germany and Eastern Europe. She worked with survivors, children's homes, homes for the aged, and aided Palestine Jewish Brigade members helping survivors travel through Belgium to Palestine. She also traveled to the Netherlands to aid the Dutch Jewish community, entering Amsterdam twenty-four hours after the Germans had left. She was decorated by the Belgian government for her work.

== Post-war career ==
Margolis was sent to France in 1946 as the JDC's first female Country Director, where she helped rebuild the French Jewish community, including setting up children's homes, establishing vocational training programs, providing aid for the sick and elderly, and aided people working on illegal immigration to Palestine. In 1950, Margolis married Zionist leader Marc Jarblum (1887–1972). Jarblum was the editor of two Poale Zion Yiddish newspapers in Paris and was also active in the Resistance during World War II. The Jarblums immigrated to Israel in 1953 where Margolis served as the Director of Social Services for Malben, an organization set up in 1949 by the JDC as a system of services and organizations to care for elderly, chronically ill and handicapped immigrants to Israel. At the end of 1955 she was drafted by the Jewish Agency to work with new immigrants in the new development towns, where she remained until 1958, when she returned to Malben as Director for Special Projects, working with handicapped children and adults.

Marc Jarblum died in 1972. Laura Margolis remained at Malben until 1974, when she retired, after which she returned to the United States. Laura Margolis Jarblum died on September 9, 1997, at the home of her nephew, James A. Margolis, in Brookline, Massachusetts at the age of 93.
