= Warren Kozak =

American journalist and author (born 1951)

Warren Kozak (born 1951) is an American journalist and author. He has written for, among others, The Wall Street Journal and the New York Sun. He was an on-air reporter at National Public Radio and wrote for television network anchors including Ted Koppel, Charles Gibson, Diane Sawyer, and Aaron Brown.

== Personal life and education ==
Warren Kozak was born and raised in Milwaukee, Wisconsin, where he attended public schools and graduated from John Marshall High School. He graduated from the University of Wisconsin-Madison in 1973 with a degree in Political Science. He now lives in New York with his family.

== Writing career ==
Kozak is the author of The Rabbi of 84th Street, a biography of Haskel Besser, which chronicles the Hasidic world of pre-World War II Poland, its destruction, and its post-War rebirth. It was published by HarperCollins in 2004.

His second book, LeMay: The Life and Wars of General Curtis LeMay was released in 2009. In October 2010, he delivered the Exemplar keynote address at the United States Air Force Academy on the occasion of the selection of Curtis LeMay as the Exemplar of the Class of 2013. He has also lectured at the United States Military Academy at West Point.

== Publications ==
- The Rabbi of 84th Street: The Extraordinary Life of Haskel Besser, HarperCollins, 2004, ISBN 006051101X
- LeMay: The Life and Wars of General Curtis LeMay, Regnery, 2009, ISBN 9781596985698 OCLC 316327125
- Presidential Courage: Three Speeches That Changed America, 2012.

== Prizes ==
Kozak was awarded the Benton Fellowship at the University of Chicago in 1993.
