= Shanghai Jewish Refugees Museum =

Museum and former synagogue in Shanghai, China

- 上海犹太难民纪念馆
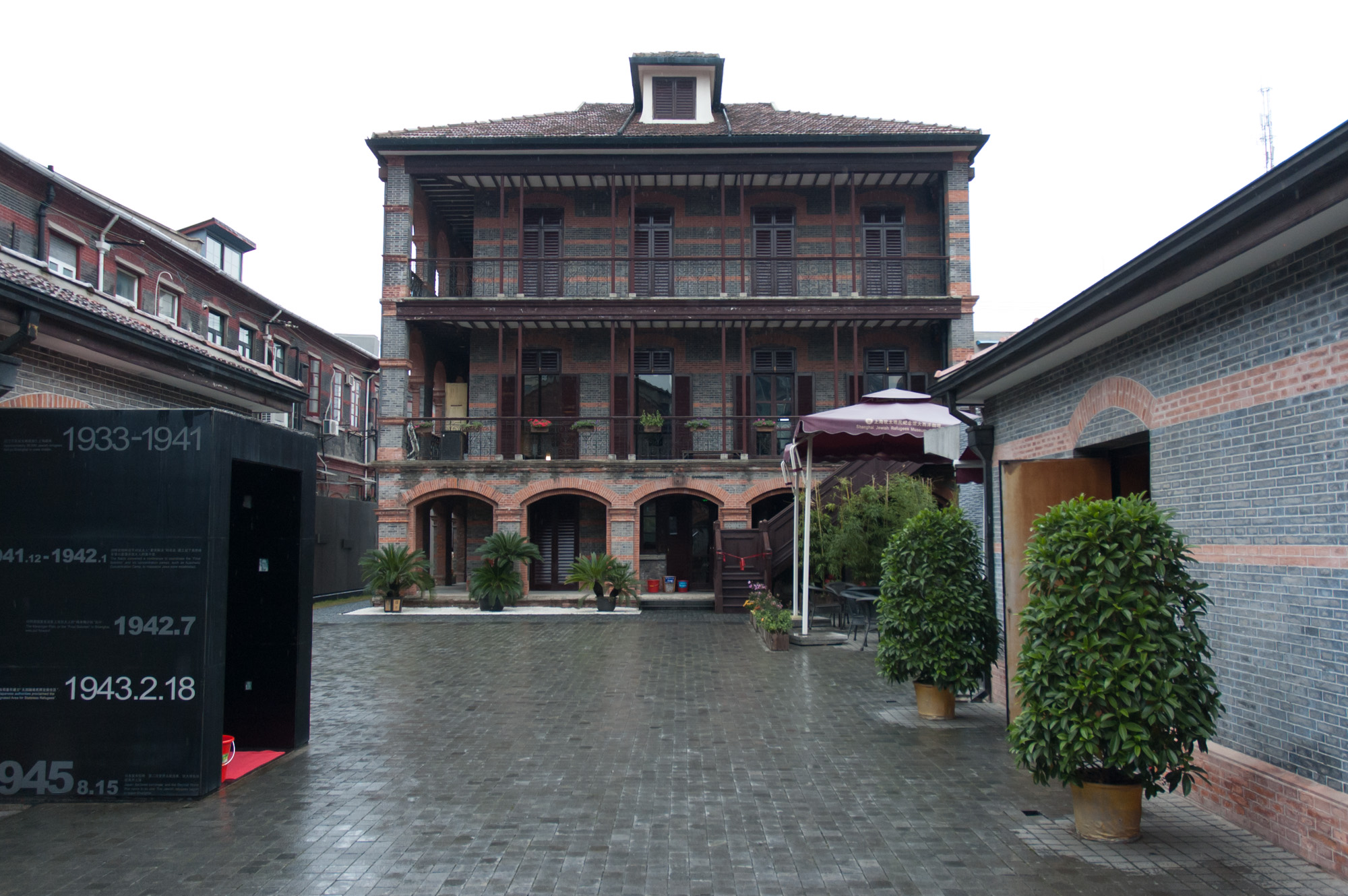

- Location of the museum and former synagogue, in Shanghai
- Established: 2007
- Location: 62 Changyang Road, Hongkou, Shanghai, 200082
- Coordinates: 31°15′16″N 121°30′33″E
- Type: Jewish museum
- Website: www.shhkjrm.com

Shanghai Jewish Refugees Museum
- Simplified Chinese: 上海犹太难民纪念馆
- Traditional Chinese: 上海猶太難民紀念館
Transcriptions
Standard Mandarin
- Hanyu Pinyin: Shànghǎi Yóutài Nànmín Jìniànguǎn

The Shanghai Jewish Refugees Museum is a museum commemorating the Jewish refugees who lived in Shanghai after fleeing Europe to escape Nazi persecution. It is located at the former Ohel Moshe or Moishe Synagogue, in the Tilanqiao Historic Area of Hongkou district, Shanghai, China. The museum features documents, photographs, films, and personal items documenting the lives of some of the more than 20,000 Jewish residents of the Restricted Sector for Stateless Refugees, better known as the Shanghai Ghetto, during the Japanese occupation of Shanghai.

== Background ==
The museum is situated in what was once the Jewish Quarter of Shanghai, which had had a Jewish community since the late 19th century, in Hongkou District (formerly rendered as "Hongkew").

After the 1937 Battle of Shanghai, Japan occupied the Chinese sections of Shanghai, but the foreign concessions—the Shanghai International Settlement and the Shanghai French Concession—were still under the control of the European powers.

In the 1930s, Nazi Germany encouraged German and Austrian Jews to emigrate, but most countries closed their borders to them, Shanghai and the Dominican Republic being the only exceptions. 20,000 European Jews sought refuge in Shanghai, which did not require a visa to enter, the most of any city in the world. The Ohel Moshe Synagogue was the primary place of worship for the Jewish refugees in Shanghai.

Soon after Japan attacked Pearl Harbor in December 1941 and declared war on the allies, Japan invaded Shanghai's foreign concessions and occupied the whole city. The war ended the flow of American funds to the impoverished Jewish refugees. The Japanese imposed restrictions on the Jews, and in 1943 officially established the Restricted Sector for Stateless Refugees, better known as the Shanghai Ghetto, in Hongkou, forcing most Jews to live there. Strictly speaking it was not a ghetto as it housed a mix of residents including Chinese people. After World War II, China soon fell into a civil war, which ended in the victory of the Communist Party in 1949, and almost all the Shanghai Jews emigrated by 1956.

== Ohel Moshe Synagogue ==
Ohel Moshe Synagogue
- Chinese: 摩西會堂
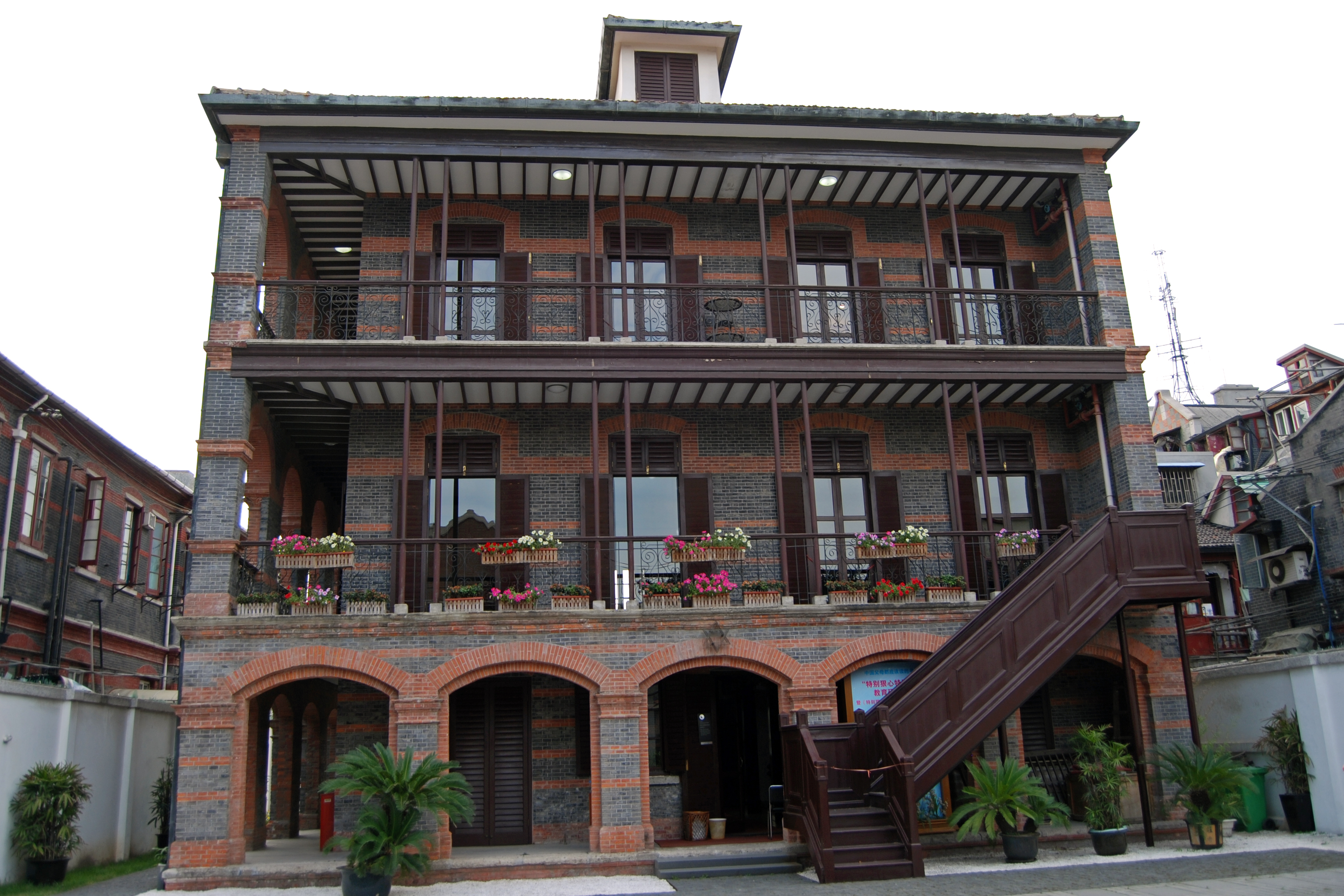
- A closeup view of the former synagogue

- Location of the former synagogue, now museum, in Shanghai

Religion
- Affiliation: Judaism (former)
- Rite: Nusach Ashkenaz
- Ecclesiastical or organisational status: Synagogue (1927–1949); Non-religious use (1949–1990s); Jewish museum (since 2007)
- Status: Closed (as a synagogue); Repurposed

Location
- Location: 62 Changyang Road, Hongkou, Shanghai
- Country: China

Architecture
- Founder: Rabbi Meir Ashkenazi
- Established: 1907 (as a congregation)
- Completed: 1927

Shanghai Jewish Refugees Museum

Ohel Moshe Synagogue
- Traditional Chinese: 摩西會堂
- Simplified Chinese: 摩西会堂
Transcriptions
Standard Mandarin
- Hanyu Pinyin: Móxī Huìtáng

The Ohel Moshe congregation was established by Russian Jewish immigrants in Shanghai in 1907. This Ashkenazi congregation was named after Moshe Greenberg, a member of the Russian Jewish community, and was first established in a rented space. As the congregation grew to 250 families by the 1920s, Rabbi Meir Ashkenazi, Chief Rabbi of Shanghai, supported the creation of a new space for the congregation. In 1927, the current structure was created by remodeling an existing three-story building in the Hongkou District, removing the second floor and adding a mezzanine. The synagogue is situated on what was once Ward Road (now Changyang Road), close to the Ward Road Gaol (now Tilanqiao Prison).

The synagogue was confiscated by the government after the Communists won the Chinese civil war in 1949 and converted into a psychiatric hospital. It was also used for office space. It reopened in the 1990s.

Ohel Moshe and Ohel Rachel are the only two Jewish synagogues of old Shanghai that still stand, out of the original six. In 2004, the Ohel Moshe Synagogue was inscribed on the list of architectural heritage treasures of Shanghai. In 2007, the Government of Hongkou District restored the synagogue to its original architectural style based on the original drawings in the municipal archives, and opened it as a museum commemorating the Jewish refugees. Some of the residential buildings from the ghetto period still stand around the former synagogue, though most have been demolished. The museum itself, and the remaining historic structures, are preserved as part of the Tilanqiao Historic Area.

== Monument ==
In 2014 the museum unveiled a monument to the refugees, which includes more than 13,000 names and a memorial statue commemorating their experience. The memorial was designed by artist He Ning.

== Exhibits ==
The Shanghai Jewish Refugees Museum encompasses the Ohel Moshe Synagogue building, two additional exhibition halls, and a courtyard. The synagogue exhibition presents a "small collection of artifacts" depicting the lives of Jewish refugees who found shelter in Shanghai during the Holocaust. Historical objects on display include ritual items, cultural items, gifts from Jewish philanthropic donors, and gifts from "the people of Israel to China."

One exhibit on the second floor of the synagogue is devoted to the life of the Chief Rabbi of Shanghai, Rabbi Meir Ashkenazi. While the synagogue still contains a Torah ark, Ark cover, and reader's platform, it does not have a Torah scroll or prayer books, precluding its use for prayer services.

The No. 2 Exhibition Hall, completed in 2007, displays more than 140 historical photographs and other artifacts including artworks, a refugee's passport, copies of the Shanghai Jewish Chronicle, and a stone tablet engraved with the words of Israeli Prime Minister Yitzhak Rabin during his visit to Shanghai. A documentary film about the refugees is also shown in the hall. The No. 3 Exhibition Hall was completed in May 2008, and is used for temporary exhibits.

In September 2014, a 34-metre (112 ft) long copper memorial wall was unveiled at the site, engraved with the names of 13,732 Jewish refugees harbored in China during World War II.

Israeli Prime Minister Benjamin Netanyahu visited the museum in 2013 and praised Shanghai's historic role as a sanctuary for Jewish refugees.

== Gallery ==
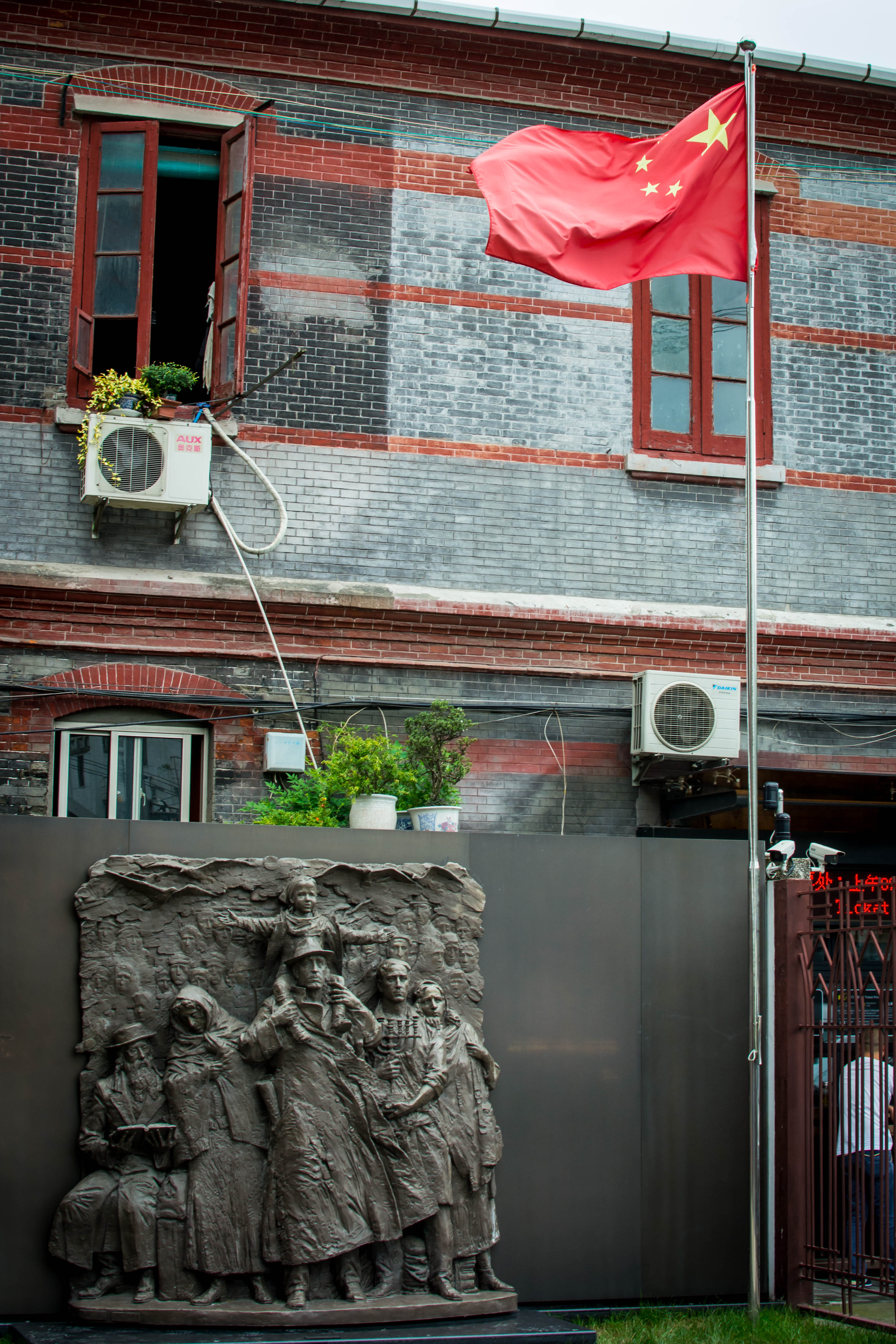
Monument on display at the entrance to the museum, with Chinese flag

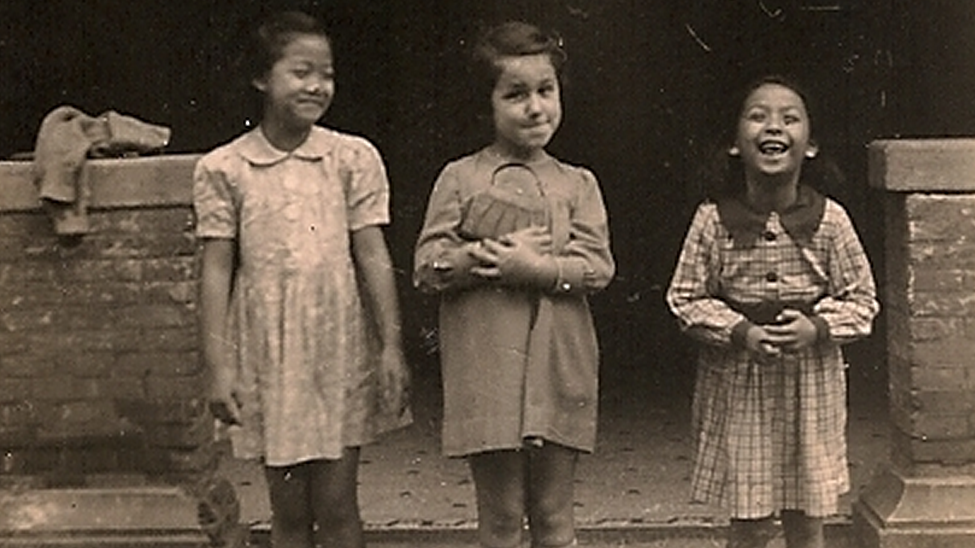
A Jewish girl and her Chinese friends in the Shanghai Ghetto, from the collection of the Shanghai Jewish Refugees Museum

== See also ==
- History of the Jews in China
- List of synagogue in China
- List of Holocaust memorials and museums in China
- Center of Jewish Studies Shanghai

== Notes ==
=== Sources ===
- Ember, Carol R.; Ember, Melvin; Skoggard, Ian A., eds. (2005). Encyclopedia of Diasporas: Immigrant and Refugee Cultures Around the World. Springer Science & Business Media. ISBN 9780306483219.
- Falbaum, Berl, ed. (2005). Shanghai Remembered: Stories of Jews who Escaped to Shanghai from Nazi Europe. Momentum Books. ISBN 1879094738.
- Peh-T'i Wei, Betty (1993). Old Shanghai. Oxford University Press. ISBN 019585747X.
- Ristaino, Marcia Reynders (2003). Port of Last Resort: The Diaspora Communities of Shanghai. Stanford University Press. ISBN 9780804750233.
