= Antisemitism in Japan =

Antisemitism in Japan has developed over the years despite the presence of a relatively small and obscure Jewish population. Japan had no traditional antisemitism until nationalist ideology and propaganda began to spread on the eve of World War II. (Note: Goodman & Miyazawa 1995, pp. 259–60: "Japanese antisemitism is an eruption of the darkness of modern history. It is a malign version of the basic patterns of Japanese culture. It derives from the virulent political obscurantism of Japanese xenophobes, who pandered paranoid fantasies throughout the modern period to assuage their feelings of insecurity and anomie. It is an integral component of the ideology that, in the 1930s, assumed control of Japan and precipitated World War II. It is the hidden, grotesque face of the wartime chauvinism that survived, transformed, after the war. To deny the historical roots of Japanese antisemitism is to ignore the historical legacy of Japanese ethnic nationalism and to deny the historical continuity of Japan.") Before and during the war, Nazi Germany, an ally to the Japanese, encouraged Japan to adopt antisemitic policies. In the post-war period, extremist groups and ideologues have promoted conspiracy theories.

== History ==
In 1918, the Imperial Japanese Army sent troops to Siberia to cooperate with the White movement. White Army soldiers had been issued copies of The Protocols of the Elders of Zion, and Japanese soldiers first learned about antisemitism. The Protocols continue to be used as evidence of Jewish conspiracies even though they are widely acknowledged to be a forgery.

According to Dr. David Kranzler:

The key to the distinction between the Japanese and the European form of antisemitism seems to lie in the long Christian tradition of identifying the Jew with the Devil, the Antichrist or someone otherwise beyond redemption...The Japanese lacked this Christian image of the Jew and brought to their reading of the Protocols a totally different perspective. The Christian tried to solve the problem of the Jew by eliminating him; the Japanese tried to harness his alleged immense wealth and power to Japan's advantage.

=== Pre–World War II ===
In 1925 Captain Norihiro Yasue published the first translation of the Protocols in Japanese. A Russian-language specialist, he was assigned to the staff of General Gregorii Semenov, a vehement anti-Semite who distributed copies of the Protocols to all of his troops. Along with a few dozen other Japanese soldiers, Yasue read and accepted the premises of the Protocols, and contributed for a time to various antisemitic publications, including Kokusai Himitsu Ryoku no Kenkyu (国際秘密力の研究, Studies in the International Conspiracy), under the pen-name Hō Kōshi. He later changed his views when in 1940 Japan signed the Tripartite Pact which formally sealed Japan's alliance with Nazi Germany. His newly pro-Semitic stance led to his dismissal from the Japanese Army.

During the 1930s Minetaro Yamanaka (山中峯太郎) wrote stories about the Yudayaka, the "Jewish Peril." A major journalist at the Tokyo Asahi Shimbun, Yamanaka was a prolific author of children's fiction who serialized the novel Daitō no Tetsujin (Superman of the Great Orient) from August 1933 until the end of 1934 in the periodical Shōnen Kurabu (Boys' Club), read mainly by Japanese boys between the ages of 8 and 12. The hero of this story is the detective Hongō Yoshiaki who battles the villain Sekima, head of the shadowy Zion Alliance, a Jewish secret organization seeking to undermine the Japanese Empire. A typical quote from Superman of the Great Orient:

There are about 13.5 million Jews scattered around the world. Hundreds of years ago they gobbled up all the world's wealth. Especially in the United States, Britain, France, and in other Western countries too, there are many rich Jews who do whatever they want with the money of the people...This wealth is used to increase the invisible Jewish power throughout Europe and the United States...These scary Jews have a secret society called the Zion Alliance. The goal of the Zion Alliance is...that all nations be ruled by Jews...This is a real global conspiracy.

Yamanaka stopped writing with the surrender of Japan in August 1945, but Kodansha Ltd. continued reprinting this series until the 1970s.

In 1936 Lieutenant General Nobutaka Shiōden re-translated the Protocols into Japanese. Shiōden had become a fervent anti-Semite and a believer in Jewish conspiracy theory while he was studying in France. When he returned to Japan he became the leading voice of antisemitic propaganda.

Brian Victoria states that Tanaka Chigaku promoted antisemitism in Japan starting in 1937 with the publication of Shishi-ō Zenshū Daisan-shū (Complete Works of the Lion King), in which he said:

At present sixty to seventy percent of the world's money is said to be in Jewish hands. There are many poor and penniless countries that end up having to accept capital from abroad in order to get by, and consequently they have to submit to Jews in order to borrow the money they need. Typically Jews invest in transportation facilities, electric plants, railways and subways. ... The reason for this is based on the plan contained in the Protocols to constantly foment revolution in various countries, eventually leading to their collapse. It is then that the Jews will be able to take over.

According to Victoria, "Tanaka argued that Jews were fomenting social unrest in order to rule the world. He ... [points out] that Jews advocated liberalism, especially within academic circles, as part of their plan to destroy the people's moral sense ... Helped by men like Tanaka, antisemitism spread rapidly throughout Japanese society despite the near-total absence of Jews."

Also during the 1930s, Japan circulated antisemitic publications and sentiment within China. Under Japanese occupation in the 1930s, the Jews of Harbin were the victims of antisemitism by the White Russian fascist elements. The Japanese occupiers tolerated this antisemitic treatment. As a result, many Jews of Harbin fled to Shanghai.

=== World War II ===
On 8 February 1943, the Japanese occupiers created what they described as the designated area (the Shanghai ghetto) in Hongkew where they re-located and segregated the Jewish refugees whom Nazi Germany had stripped of citizenship. Jews in the Japanese-run ghetto could not leave without a pass and experienced extreme poverty. The Shanghai ghetto lasted until the Japanese surrendered in 1945.

During the Holocaust, since Shanghai was one of the few places in the world that did not need require a visa or travel documents. In 1941, Japanese forces began systematically taking control of the areas of Shanghai which they had not previously occupied. In November of that year, Nazi Germany stripped Jews abroad of their citizenship, resulting in Jews abroad becoming stateless refugees. SS-Colonel Josef Meisinger tried to influence the Japanese to exterminate approximately 18,000–20,000 stateless Jews who had escaped from Austria and Germany and who were living in Japanese-occupied Shanghai. His proposals included the creation of a concentration camp on Chongming Island in the delta of the Yangtze, or starvation on freighters off the coast of China. The Japanese built a ghetto in the neighborhood of Hongkew. The ghetto was strictly isolated by Japanese soldiers under the command of the Japanese official Kano Ghoya, and Jews could only leave it with special permission. Japanese authorities censored Jewish cultural activities. The Jews forced to live in the ghetto experienced extreme poverty. Some 2,000 of them died in the Shanghai Ghetto during the wartime period.

However, Japan refused to adopt an official policy against the Jews. On 31 December 1940, Japanese foreign minister Yōsuke Matsuoka told a group of Jewish businessmen: "Nowhere have I promised that we would carry out Hitler's anti-Semitic policies in Japan. This is not simply my personal opinion, it is the opinion of Japan." Nonetheless, until 1945 the Holocaust was systematically concealed by the leadership in Tokyo.

Brian Victoria also states that Haku'un Yasutani "was one of the few Zen masters to integrate virulent antisemitism into his pro-war stance." He quotes Yasutani's 1943 Dōgen Zenji to Shūshōgi:

We must be aware of the existence of the demonic teachings of the Jews who assert things like [the existence of] equality in the phenomenal world, thereby distorting public order in our nation's society and destroying [governmental] control. Not only this, these demonic conspirators hold the deep-seated delusion and blind belief that ... they alone have been chosen by God and are [therefore] an exceptionally superior people. The result of all this is a treacherous design to usurp [control of] and dominate the entire world, thus provoking the great upheavals of today.

Although Yasutani was well known to have been a friend and mentor of the Nazi propagandist Karlfried Graf Dürckheim, Victoria feels that Japanese antisemitism evolved independently from the "heart of the 'home-grown' reactionary social role that institutional Buddhism played in Japanese society following the Meiji Period."

=== Post–World War II ===
==== 1970s ====
At the end of the 20th century, many books about Japanese-Jewish common ancestry theory were sold. Numerous theories and explanations for the alleged Jewish control of the world were circulated. These books, called tondemo-bon (outrageous or preposterous books), contained elements of the occult and tabloid-style speculation.

In 1979, a book named 日本人に謝りたい あるユダヤ人の懺悔 Nihonjin ni ayamaritai - Aru yudayajin no zange (I'd like to apologize to the Japanese: A Jewish elder's confession) was published. The author of this book, Mordecai Mose (モルデカイ・モーゼ), called himself a rabbi, but actually, it was a pseudonym of the self-styled translator of this book, Masao Kubota (久保田政男). Kubota also spread the rumor that "Enola Gay" means "Kill the Emperor" in Yiddish. This rumor is groundless, but anti-Semites in Japan still give credence to it.

==== 1980s ====
In 1984, a book named 世界を動かすユダヤ・パワーの秘密 Sekai wo ugokasu yudaya pawah no himitsu (Secrets of the Jewish Power that Controls the World) was published. This book is based on Jewish conspiracy theory. The author, Eizaburo Saito (斉藤栄三郎), was a leading member of the Liberal Democratic Party.

In 1986, a book named ユダヤが解ると世界が見えてくる Yudaya ga wakaruto sekai ga miete kuru (To Watch Jews Is to See the World Clearly) became one of Japan's best sellers. This book is also based on the Protocols and the author, Masami Uno (宇野正美), writes that the Ashkenazim are actually descendants of Khazarian, hence they are "fake Jews," and that Sephardim are true pedigreed Jews. According to him, some of the Japanese are the descendants of the Ten Lost Tribes of Israel and that the Japanese Sephardim will defeat the Ashkenazim.

The same year a book named これからの10年間 ユダヤ・プロトコール超裏読み術—あなたに起こるショッキングな現実 Yudaya purotokoru cho-urayomi-jutsu (The Expert Way to Read Jewish Protocols) also became one of Japan's bestsellers. The author, Kinji Yajima (矢島鈞次, 1919–1994), an economist and a professor at Aoyama Gakuin University, stated that although the Protocols is probably a forgery,

...it was put together from the results of all the research ever done on the Jews...There is no doubt that the contents consist of the wisdom of the Jews.

In 1987, a magazine named 歴史読本 Rekishi dokuhon (The History Magazine) featured articles titled 世界、謎のユダヤ Sekai, nazo no yudaya (The world of the Mysterious Jews), which insisted that the Watergate scandal and the Lockheed bribery scandals were Jewish conspiracies. It also reported that former prime minister Kakuei Tanaka said "Yudaya Nelson Rockefeller ni yarareta, yudaya ni ki wo tsukero," [I've been gotten by Jews, Nelson Rockefeller, be wary of Jews] when he was released on bail in 1976.

==== 1990s ====
Between 1992 and 1995 Aum Shinrikyo, a controversial Buddhist religious group, also distributed conspiracy theories to attract Japanese readers as part of their recruitment efforts. Its founder, Shoko Asahara, was influenced by Goto Ben's 1973 book, ノストラダムスの大予言 Nostradamusu no Daiyogen (Prophecies of Nostradamus), a loose translation of the Prophecies which became a bestseller in Japan. Hideo Murai, one of the leaders of Aum Shinrikyo, uttered the words "Jews got me (ユダ［ヤ］にやられた, yuda[ya] ni yarareta)" when he was stabbed to death.

In February 1995 a magazine named Marco Polo (マルコポーロ), a 250,000-circulation monthly aimed at Japanese males, ran a Holocaust denial article by physician Masanori Nishioka (西岡昌紀) which stated:

The 'Holocaust' is a fabrication. There were no execution gas chambers in Auschwitz or in any other concentration camp. Today, what are displayed as 'gas chambers' at the remains of the Auschwitz camp in Poland are a post-war fabrication by the Polish communist regime or by the Soviet Union, which controlled the country. Not once, neither at Auschwitz nor in any territory controlled by the Germans during the Second World War, was there 'mass murder of Jews' in 'gas chambers.'

The Los Angeles-based Simon Wiesenthal Center instigated a boycott of Bungei Shunju advertisers, including Volkswagen, Mitsubishi, and Cartier. Within days, Bungei Shunju shut down Marco Polo and its editor, Kazuyoshi Hanada, quit, as did the president of Bungei Shunju, Kengo Tanaka.

In October 1999 a Japanese publication, The Weekly Post, published a story on the proposed acquisition of the Long-Term Credit Bank of Japan by Ripplewood Holdings, which the article described as being "Jewish":

The strong will of Jewish finance capital, which prides itself on its enormous power and covers the world's financial markets like a fine net, was behind the buyout of LTCBJ. It is not hard to imagine that the offensive of Jewish finance capital will intensify the cutthroat struggle for survival among companies brought on by the 1997 Asian financial crisis.

This soon generated strong complaints by Jewish groups, particularly outside Japan. The Weekly Post quickly retracted the article and carried an apology on its home page. The publication explained its error by noting that "the problem stemmed from the stereotyped image of the Jewish people that many Japanese people have."

==== 2000s ====
Former police official Atsuyuki Sassa stated on the Nippon TV network program “Wake Up! Plus,” which aired on March 21, 2009, stating, “I think there were probably terrible capitalists like that around the 18th century. To put it bluntly—and I'm sorry to say this—they were Jews. After all, it's the Jews who are doing terrible things now, isn't it?”

=== Current situation ===
Since the turn of the century, Ryu Ota, an ex-Trotskyist, is one of the leading propagandists for Jewish conspiracy theory. He has translated the books of Eustace Mullins into Japanese.

On March 8, 2009, Soichiro Tahara (田原総一朗), political journalist and host of TV Asahi's Sunday Project program, told Makiko Tanaka that her father, former Prime Minister Kakuei Tanaka, was "done in by America, by the Jews and Ozawa, (leader of the Democratic Party of Japan) too, was done in [by America and/or the Jews]" during a live broadcast. The Simon Wiesenthal Center strongly criticized Tahara for antisemitic and anti-American accusations.

In 2014, 31 municipal libraries in Japan reported having 265 copies of The Diary of a Young Girl by Anne Frank and other books vandalized, usually with several pages torn or ripped out. Chief Cabinet Secretary Yoshihide Suga said that police were investigating. Japanese politician Nariaki Nakayama said that the act could not have been committed by a Japanese, saying that it was against Japanese sensibilities. A 36-year-old man was arrested in connection with the vandalism on March 14, however in June prosecutors announced that they would not press charges after a psychiatric evaluation revealed that the man was mentally incompetent.

A 2014 ADL telephone survey asserted that of 500 people, 23% +/- 4.4% of the adult population in Japan harbor antisemitic attitudes. Furthermore, the study reveals that 46% of the population agree with the statement "Jews think they are better than other people", and that almost half of the respondents (49%) think that "Jews are more loyal to Israel than to Japan." However, this survey has been critiqued by journalist Jesse Singal as being unreasonably simplistic in its classification of "harboring antisemitic attitudes".

== See also ==
- History of the Jews in Japan
- Antisemitic canards
  - Jewish conspiracy theories
  - world financial system conspiracy theories, Rothschild conspiracy theories
  - Jewish State conspiracy theories
- Fugu Plan
- 1973 and 1970s oil crisis ("oil shock", oiru śokku)
- Boycotts of Israel
- Israel–Japan relations
- New Left in Japan (Shinsayoku)
  - Lod Airport massacre
- Taizō Itagaki
- Shiro Suzuki (politician)
- Toshio Motoya
- Chiune Sugihara
- Norihiro Yasue
- Shanghai ghetto
- Jewish settlement in the Japanese Empire
