= Abraham Kaufman =

Russian-born medical doctor, community organizer, and Zionist

Abraham Josevich Kaufman
- Абрам Иосифович Кауфман
- Born: 22 November 1885; Megilne, Russian Empire
- Died: 25 March 1971 (aged 85); Tel Aviv, Israel
- Occupations: Medical doctor, community organizer, Zionist
- Known for: Protecting Jews in East Asia during WWII
- Board member of: Jewish National Fund; Keren Hayesod; World Zionist Organization; Jewish Agency; Hebrew Association of Harbin; Far Eastern Jewish Council

Abraham Josevich Kaufman (Russian: Абрам Иосифович Кауфман; born November 22, 1885 – d. March 25, 1971) was a Russian-born medical doctor, community organizer and Zionist who helped protect some tens of thousands of Jews seeking safe-haven in East Asia from Nazi atrocities during World War II.

As a consequence of his contacts with Japanese authorities during World War II and the Second Sino-Japanese War, he was kidnapped, arrested and imprisoned by Soviet authorities immediately after the war, and was interned in a Soviet Gulag penal labor camp from 1945 to 1956. Israeli authorities subsequently worked to expedite his immigration to Israel, where he was able to resume his medical practice.

== Early life ==
Abraham Kaufman was born to Yosef Zalmonovich Kaufman in 1885 in Megilne (Мглине), a tiny Jewish village near Chernigov (ex-Chernihovsky Region –– бывшей Черниговской губернии) in Ukraine, then part of the Russian Empire). He was a great-grandson of Rabbi Shneur Zalman of Liadi, who founded the Chabad movement. Kaufman graduated from a traditional Gymnasium Institute (secondary school) in Perm, Russia, in 1903, where he became interested in Zionism. He then studied medicine from 1904 at the University of Bern, Switzerland, graduating and returning to Russia in 1908 or 1909.

Kaufman became an ardent Zionist, and while working in Perm after completing his medical degree he devoted all his spare time to supporting the movement, working under Dr. E. V. Chlenov (Е.В.Членов) in the Moscow region. He toured a number of cities lecturing on Zionism, and supervised the Hovevei Zion (хавевей-цион) organization, which was headed by his father Yosef.

== Move to China ==
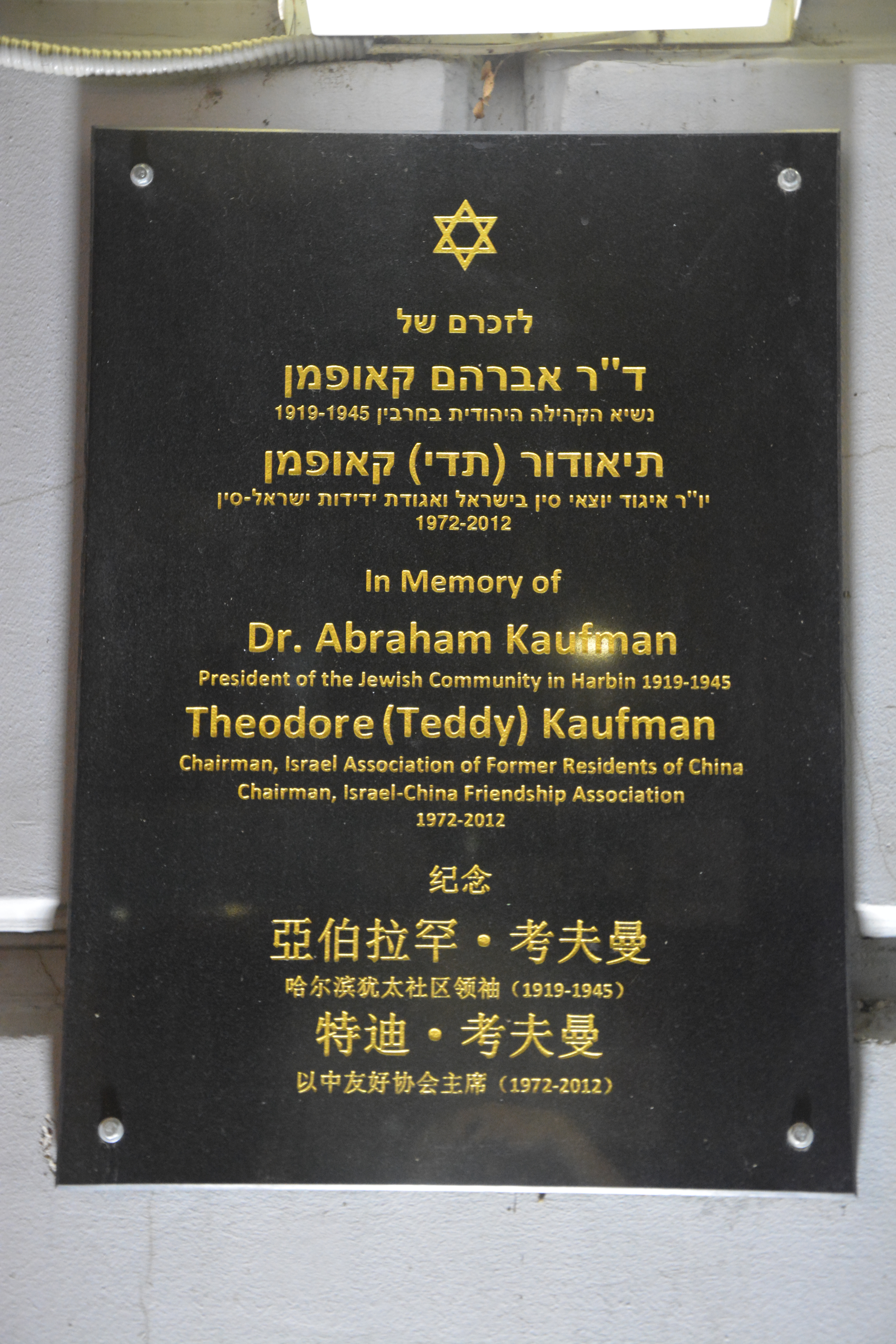
Memorial plaque for Abraham Kaufman and Theodore Kaufman on the Harbin Old Synagogue Concert Hall (then the Harbin General Synagogue). Kaufman worked in the synagogue from 1919 to 1945.

Kaufman emigrated to Harbin, China in 1912, and quickly became the community shtadlan (organizer), active in many Jewish organizations. In 1914 he helped organize the EKOPO society (Jewish Committee for the Help of War Victims) to assist some 200,000 World War I refugees with shelter, food and medical care. In 1919 he became a Zionist leader in the Harbin Jewish community, and of Manchuria (called Manchukuo when it was occupied by Imperial Japan) more widely, in the 1930s. He became an integral part of the cultural organizations of Harbin Jewry. Between 1919 and 1945 he was variously:

- medical director of the Jewish hospital of Harbin
- chairman of the Harbin's Jewish community
- chairman of the Jewish National Fund and Keren Hayesod Zionist fundraising organizations
- board member of the World Zionist Organization and the Jewish Agency
- chairman of the Jewish Zionist organization of China
- president of the Hebrew Association of Harbin
- chief editor of the Evreiskaya Zhizn ("Jewish Life" – Еврейская жизнь) weekly Jewish magazine in Russian (1921–1943)
- chairman of the National Council of the Jews of Eastern Asia (Far East) in 1937

He was also the head of the Far Eastern Jewish Council (FEJ – Национального Совета) which he helped found, and also the Vaad Haleumi (Ваад-Галеуми), both founded in 1937 with the encouragement of Japanese officials such as Norihiro Yasue.

== Activities during the Holocaust ==
Befriended by Imperial Japanese Army Colonel Yasue and General Kiichirō Higuchi, the engineers of the later-named "Fugu Plan", Kaufman organized three large conferences of the Far Eastern Jewish Council, which brought together Jews from across East Asia, and successfully appealed for his organization to be accepted under the umbrella of the World Jewish Congress. Through these conferences, he worked to encourage Jews from other parts of the region, and the world, to think of Manchukuo as a safe-haven for Jews, reassuring them, as his Japanese friends had assured him, that the Japanese were not anti-Semitic, nor inclined to be racially discriminatory against Jews.

In May 1939, Kaufman was invited on an official visit to Tokyo, where he visited many of the ministries of the Japanese government, met with a number of officials, and became one of the few foreigners to be honored with an imperial award. He used this opportunity to express to the government officials with whom he met the desires, needs and attitudes of the Jews of Manchukuo, and was reassured of the non-discriminatory attitude of the Japanese government. He formally thanked Prime Minister Nobuyuki Abe for the prejudice-free protection offered Jews in East Asia by the Japanese authorities, and suggested that the global Jewish community would be grateful should Japan create a safe haven in East Asia, and that in return the Jewish communities of East Asia would support Imperial Japan's vision for a new order in East Asia.

By 1942, a great number of Jews had sought refuge in Japan from Eastern Europe, settling in Kobe before being moved to the Shanghai Ghetto in China. As early as 1941, the local Gestapo chief Josef Meisinger (The Butcher of Warsaw) visited the ghetto, and proposed plans to exterminate its Jewish population. Kaufman, through his influence and contacts in the Japanese government, prevailed upon Tokyo to prevent Meisinger's plans being carried out. Ultimately, Kaufman succeeded and Meisinger's schemes were rejected by Tokyo, but not before the doctor along with seven other Jewish community leaders were arrested, imprisoned, and maltreated by the Kempeitai (Japanese military police) as traitors for accusing Japan of plotting genocide. All but one of the community leaders were released days or weeks after their arrests.

Following his release, Kaufman returned to Harbin, and to his activities with the Far Eastern Jewish Council, which included raising substantial donations to the severely impoverished Jewish community in Shanghai.

== Post–war arrest by the Soviets ==
In 1945, just days before the end of World War II, the Soviet Union declared war on Japan and invaded Manchuria, overrunning Harbin. To celebrate the end of the war a short time later on August 21, the Soviets held a formal reception to which they invited the many minority leaders of the city, including Dr. Kaufman. The Soviets then kidnapped him along with two of his colleagues, Anatoly Grigorievich Orlovsky (Анатолий Григорьевич Орловский), and Moses Gdalievich Zimin (Моисей Гдальевич Зимин)). They were subsequently arrested by the Soviet Red Army on charges of collaboration with foreign forces. Kaufman's former college roommate had been another notable Zionist, Chaim Weizmann, and a passport to Palestine was immediately issued for the doctor, but the Soviets refused to release him.

The Jewish community organizers were taken to the Soviet Union, where Kaufman was imprisoned in a Gulag labor camp for 11 years. Zimin would die during his imprisonment in the Soviet penal labor camp that he was interned in.

== Emigration to Israel ==
After Kaufman's release from the Gulag system in 1956, he moved to Karaganda, Kazakhstan, and on March 25, 1961, emigrated to Israel. He was joined by his son Theodore (Teddy) Kaufman, who would later hold a high position in the Israeli government. Dr. Kaufman spent the remainder of his life practicing medicine, specializing in pediatrics under the Histadrut in Israel, and was buried there after he died in Tel Aviv in 1971.

== Family ==
Kaufman's wife also matriculated in medicine at the University of Bern. Kaufman's son Theodore became president of Association of Former Jewish Residents of China, and also the Israel-China Friendship Society. He and Heilongjiang Academy of Social Sciences Professor Qu Wei co-wrote "The Homesick Feeling of the Harbin Jews". Theodore's wife, Rasha Segerman, studied at the Shanghai Jewish School in her youth.

== See also ==
- East Asian Jews
- Hakkō ichiu
- History of the Jews in Japan
- History of the Jews in Kobe
- Jewish settlement in the Japanese Empire
