= Jewish settlement =

Jewish settlement may refer to:

== Events ==
- Jewish settlement in Palestine, also called the land of Israel (see Yishuv)
- Israeli settlement, Jewish settlements in the Israeli-occupied territories
- Pale of Settlement, a region of the Russian Empire in which permanent residency by Jews was allowed and beyond which Jewish permanent residency was generally prohibited
- Jewish settlement in the Japanese Empire
- Aliyah, settlement of Jewish refugees and voluntary migrants in Palestine
- Jodensavanne, a Jewish settlement in Dutch Guyana

== Concepts and projects ==
- Proposals for a Jewish state, various proposals and movements for settlement plans
- Homeland for the Jewish people, the general quest, mostly during the 20th century, for places for peaceful settlement in Palestine and/or other proposed sites
- Jewish Territorial Organization (ITO), a movement beginning in 1903 as a response to the British Uganda Scheme, to find an alternative territory to that of Palestine (other organizations listed here)
- Settlement movement (Israel), a movement supporting a specific style of communal settlements known as kibbutzim and moshavim.
