= Kimberley Plan =

Failed plan to settle Jews in Australia

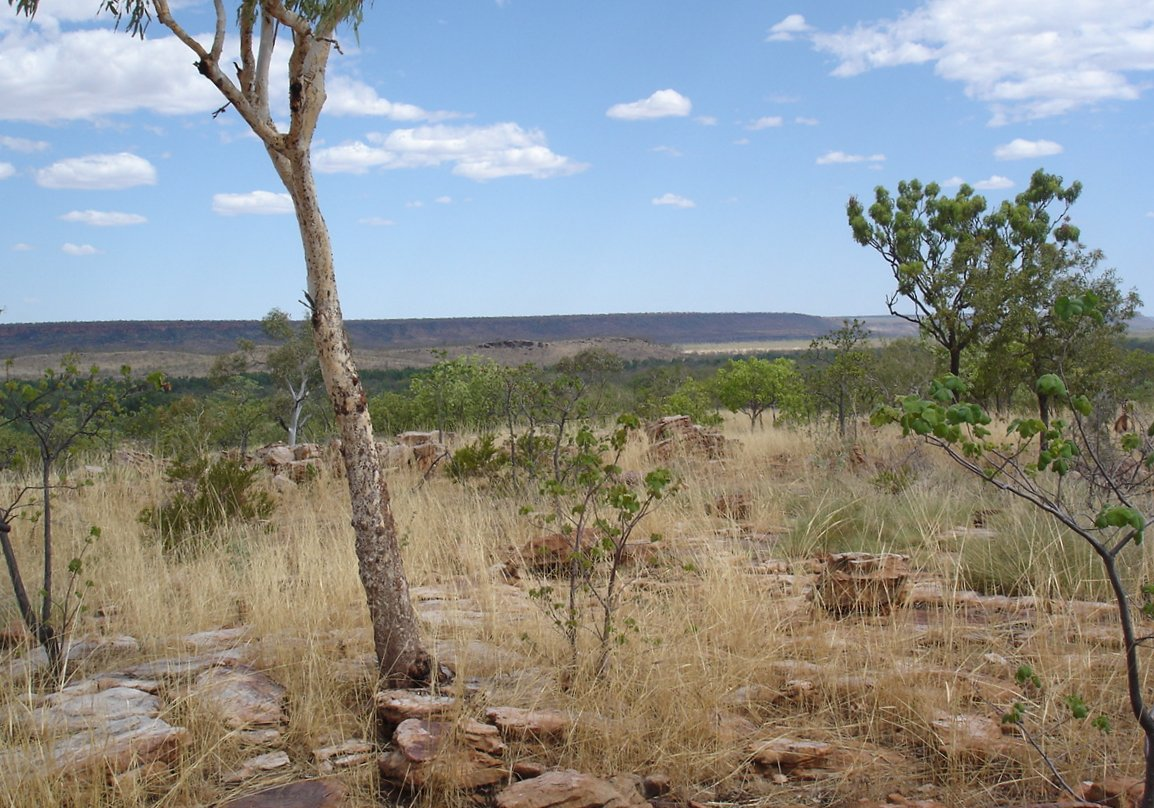
A vast semi-desert landscape within the Kimberley Region

The Kimberley Plan was a failed plan by the Freeland League to resettle Jewish refugees from Europe in northern Australia before and during the Holocaust.

== Background ==
With rampant anti-Semitism in Europe, the Freeland League for Jewish Territorial Colonization was formed in London in July 1935, to search for a potential Jewish homeland and haven. The League was a non-Zionist organisation and was led by Isaac Nachman Steinberg.

In late 1938 or early 1939, the pastoral firm of Michael Durack in Australia offered the League about 16,500 square kilometres (6,400 sq mi) in the Kimberley region in Australia, stretching from the north of Western Australia into the Northern Territory. The League sent a Yiddish poet and essayist Melech Ravitch to the Northern Territory in the 1930s to investigate the region and to collect data on topography and climate.

== Investigations ==
The League investigated the proposal, hoping to buy an area of 28,000 square kilometres (11,000 sq mi) of agricultural land for 75,000 Jews fleeing Europe. The tract in question was that of Connor, Doherty and Durack Limited, including Auvergne Station, Newry Station, and Argyle Downs, and extending between the Ord and Victoria Rivers. Under the plan, an initial 500-600 pioneers would arrive to construct basic necessities for the settlement such as homes, irrigation works, and a power station, followed by the arrival of the main body of immigrants. Ravitch in his report to the League promoted a bigger number than Steinberg, suggesting the area could accommodate a million Jewish refugees.

Steinberg (1888–1957) was sent out from London to further investigate the scheme's feasibility and to enlist governmental and communal endorsement. He arrived in Perth on 23 May 1939. Steinberg was a skilled emissary, and based his campaign on the officially declared need by Australia to populate northern Australia.

By early 1940, he won the support of churches, leading newspapers, many prominent political and public figures (including Western Australian Premier John Willcock) and a number of Jewish leaders, but he also encountered opposition. Steinberg left Australia in June 1943 to rejoin his family in Canada.

== Opposition ==
A 1944 opinion poll found that only 53% of Australians supported the scheme, with 47% against the plan. Opposition was primarily based on concerns that the settlers would inevitably drift away from Kimberley and begin migrating to the cities in large numbers. On 15 July 1944 the scheme was vetoed by the Australian government and Labor Prime Minister John Curtin (with bipartisan support) informed Steinberg that the Australian government would not "depart from the long-established policy in regard to alien settlement in Australia" and could not "entertain the proposal for a group settlement of the exclusive type contemplated by the Freeland League".

In 1948 Steinberg published a book on his experience, titled Australia – the Unpromised Land: in search of a home.

However, even after Israel was created in 1949, Steinberg tried once more – unsuccessfully – approaching the newly re-elected Robert Menzies in 1950. But Menzies replied that the idea ran contrary to his government's policy of assimilation aimed at achieving "the ideal of one Australian family of peoples, devoid of foreign communities."

== See also ==
- Andinia Plan
- Fugu Plan
- Jewish Autonomous Oblast
- Madagascar Plan
- Port Davey, another location proposed for Jewish resettlement in Australia during WWII.
- Proposals for a Jewish state
- Uganda Scheme
- Zionism
