= Proposals for a Jewish state =

Throughout Jewish history, several proposals have been made for the creation of a Jewish state, occurring between the destruction of ancient Israel and the founding of the modern State of Israel. While some have come into existence, others were never implemented. The Jewish national homeland usually refers to the State of Israel or the Land of Israel, Some have speculated whether Noah's utopian ideas may have influenced Joseph Smith, who founded the Latter Day Saint movement in Upstate New York a few years later.

== Uganda Scheme ==
The Uganda Scheme was a plan to give a portion of the East Africa Protectorate to the Jewish people as a homeland. The offer was first made by British Colonial Secretary Joseph Chamberlain to Theodore Herzl's Zionist group in 1903. He offered 5,000 square miles (13,000 km^{2}) of the Mau Escarpment in what is today Kenya. The offer was a response to pogroms in Russia, and it was hoped the area could be a refuge from persecution for the Jewish people.

The idea was brought to the World Zionist Organization's Sixth Zionist Congress in 1903 in Basel. There, a fierce debate ensued. The African land was described as an "ante-chamber to the Holy Land", but other groups felt that accepting the offer would make it more difficult to establish a Jewish state in Palestine in Ottoman Syria, particularly the Mutasarrifate of Jerusalem. Before the vote on the matter, the Russian delegation stormed out in opposition. In the end, the motion to consider the plan passed by 295 to 177 votes.

The next year, a three-man delegation was sent to inspect the plateau. Its high elevation gave it a temperate climate, making it suitable for European settlement. However, the observers found a dangerous land filled with lions and other creatures. Although the land was only sparsely inhabited by small groups of Maasai people — who themselves had only recently subjugated the Sirikwa people — the Maasai were hostile toward outsiders.

After receiving this report, Congress decided in 1905 to politely decline the British offer. Some Jews, who viewed this as a mistake, formed the Jewish Territorial Organization with the aim of establishing a Jewish state anywhere.

== Jewish Autonomous Oblast ==
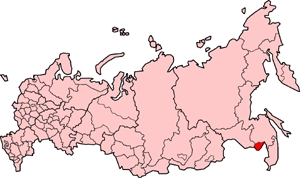
Location of the Jewish Autonomous Oblast in the Russian Federation.

On March 28, 1928, the Presidium of the General Executive Committee of the USSR passed the decree "On the attaching for Komzet of free territory near the Amur River in the Far East for settlement of the working Jews." The decree meant that there was "a possibility of establishment of a Jewish administrative territorial unit on the territory of the named region".

On August 20, 1930, the General Executive Committee of the Russian Soviet Republic (RSFSR) accepted the decree "On formation of the Birobidzhan national region in the structure of the Far Eastern Territory". The State Planning Committee considered the Birobidzhan national region as a separate economic unit. In 1932, the first scheduled figures of the region development were considered and authorized.

On May 7, 1934, the Presidium accepted the decree on its transformation in the Jewish Autonomous Region within the Russian Republic. In 1938, with formation of the Khabarovsk Territory, the Jewish Autonomous Region (JAR) was included in its structure.

According to Joseph Stalin's national policy, each of the national groups that formed the Soviet Union would receive a territory in which to pursue cultural autonomy in a socialist framework. In that sense, it was also a response to two supposed threats to the Soviet state: Judaism, which ran counter to official state policy of atheism; and Zionism, the creation of the modern State of Israel, which countered Soviet views of nationalism. Yiddish, rather than Hebrew, would be the national language, and a new socialist literature and arts would replace religion as the primary expression of culture.

Initially, there had been proposals to create a Jewish Soviet Republic in Crimea or in part of Ukraine, however these were rejected because of fears of antagonizing non-Jews in those regions.

Another important goal of the Birobidzhan project was to increase settlement in the remote Soviet Far East, especially along the vulnerable border with China. In 1928, there was virtually no settlement in the area, whereas Jews had deep roots in the western half of the Soviet Union, in Ukraine, Belarus and Russia proper.

The geography and climate of Birobidzhan were harsh, the landscape largely swampland, and any new settlers would have to build their lives from scratch. Some have even claimed that Stalin was also motivated by anti-Semitism in selecting Birobidzhan; that he wanted to keep the Jews as far away from the centers of power as possible.

The Birobidzhan experiment ground to a halt in the mid-1930s, during Stalin's first campaign of purges. Jewish leaders were arrested and executed, and Yiddish schools were shut down. Shortly after this, World War II brought to an abrupt end concerted efforts to bring Jews east.

There was a slight revival in the Birobidzhan idea after the war as a potential home for Jewish refugees. During that time, the Jewish population of the region peaked at almost one-third of the total. But efforts in this direction ended, with the doctors' plot, the establishment of Israel as a Jewish state, and Stalin's second wave of purges shortly before his death. Again the Jewish leadership was arrested and efforts were made to stamp out Yiddish culture—even the Judaica collection in the local library was burned. In the ensuing years, the idea of an autonomous Jewish region in the Soviet Union was all but forgotten.

Some scholars, such as Louis Rapoport, Jonathan Brent and Vladimir Naumov, assert that Stalin had devised a plan to deport all of the Jews of the Soviet Union to Birobidzhan much as he had internally deported other national minorities such as the Crimean Tatars and Volga Germans, forcing them to move thousands of miles from their homes. The doctors' plot may have been the first element of this plan. If so, the plan was aborted by Stalin's death on March 5, 1953.

== Fugu Plan ==
Despite the little evidence to suggest that the Japanese had ever contemplated a Jewish state or a Jewish autonomous region, Rabbi Marvin Tokayer and Mary Swartz published a book called The Fugu Plan in 1979. In this partly fictionalized book, Tokayer & Swartz gave the name the Fugu Plan or Fugu Plot (河豚計画, Fugu keikaku) to memoranda written in the 1930s Imperial Japan proposing settling Jewish refugees escaping Nazi-occupied Europe in Japanese territories. Tokayer and Swartz claim that the plan, which was viewed by its proponents as risky but potentially rewarding for Japan, was named Fugu after the Japanese word for puffer-fish, a delicacy that can be fatally poisonous if incorrectly prepared.

Tokayer and Swartz base their claim on statements made by Captain Koreshige Inuzuka. They alleged that such a plan was first discussed in 1934 and then solidified in 1938, supported by notables such as Inuzuka, Ishiguro Shiro and Norihiro Yasue; however, the signing of the Tripartite Pact in 1941 and other events prevented its full implementation. The memorandums were not called The Fugu Plan.

Ben-Ami Shillony, a professor at the Hebrew University of Jerusalem, confirms that the statements upon which Tokayer and Swartz based their claim were taken out of context and that the translation with which they worked was flawed. Shillony's view is further supported by Kiyoko Inuzuka. In "The Jews and the Japanese: The Successful Outsiders", he questioned whether the Japanese ever contemplated establishing a Jewish state or a Jewish autonomous region.

== Madagascar Plan ==
The Madagascar Plan was a suggested policy of the Third Reich government of Nazi Germany to forcibly relocate the Jewish population of Europe to the island of Madagascar. The evacuation of European Jewry to the island of Madagascar was not a new concept. Henry Hamilton Beamish, Arnold Leese, Lord Moyne, German scholar Paul de Lagarde and the British, French, and Polish governments had all contemplated the idea. Nazi Germany seized upon it, and in May 1940, in his Reflections on the Treatment of Peoples of Alien Races in the East, Heinrich Himmler declared: "I hope that the concept of Jews will be completely extinguished through the possibility of a large emigration of all Jews to Africa or some other colony."

Although some discussion of this plan had been brought forward from 1938 by other well-known Nazi ideologues, such as Julius Streicher, Hermann Göring, and Joachim von Ribbentrop, it was not until June 1940 that the plan was actually set in motion. As victory in France was imminent, it was clear that all French colonies would soon come under German control, and the Madagascar Plan could be realized. It was also felt that a potential peace treaty with Great Britain would put the British navy at Germany's disposal for use in the evacuation.

With Adolf Hitler's approval, Adolf Eichmann released a memorandum on August 15, 1940, calling for the resettlement of a million Jews per year for four years, with the island governed as a police state under the SS. The plan was postponed after the Germans failed to defeat the British in the Battle of Britain later in 1940. In 1942, the so-called "Territorial Solution to the Jewish question" was abandoned in favour of the "Final Solution to the Jewish Question".

== Jewish self-governing territory within Italian colonies ==
=== Italian East Africa ===
The Italian government during the Fascist period proposed offering to resolve the "Jewish problem" in Europe and in Palestine by resettling Jews into a Jewish self-governing territory within the northwest territory of Italian East Africa that would place them among the Beta Israel Jewish community already living in Italian East Africa. Jews from Europe and Palestine would be resettled to the north-west Ethiopian districts of Gojjam and Begemder, along with the Beta Israel community. The proposed Jewish self-governing territory was to be within the Italian Empire. The Fascist regime at the time showed racialist attitudes towards the Beta Israel Jews of Ethiopia since they are racially black and the Fascist regime deemed whites to be superior to blacks; and racial laws enacted in Italy also applied to the Beta Israel Jews in Italian East Africa that forbade intimate relationships between blacks and whites. Mussolini's plan was never implemented.

=== Italian Libya ===
In 1904, after learning of Italy's intentions to colonize Libya, Theodor Herzl presented a proposal to King Victor Emmanuel III to divert Eastern European Jewish immigration to Ottoman Tripolitania to establish an autonomous region under Italian laws. Emmanuel III rejected the proposal and said that "Tripoli is home to others" and that Italy has no control over it. In 1907, the World Zionist Organization sought to settle Russian Jews in Libya and enable the Ottoman authorities in Tripolitania to absorb them, after learning that the Ottomans were willing to accept Jewish settlements in Jabal Akhdar in Cyrenaica. However, circumstances changed following the 1909 Ottoman coup d'état and the idea of a Jewish state in Cyrenaica faded away.

== Other attempts of Jewish self-governance throughout history ==
The list below contains both historical moments of Jewish self-governance as well as other proposals for Jewish self-governance. (Note: Included in the list are: regions that had been led by Jewish monarchs; local Jewish self-governance within the context of a larger sovereign power; and proposals for Jewish states before 1948. It does not include majority-Jewish cities which were or currently are de facto Jewish-led like Salonika, Qırmızı Qəsəbə, Jodensavanne, and Kiryas Joel. It also does not contain ethnarchies, Jewish tribes like the Banu Nadir, or one-off proposals that did not garner serious consideration.)

=== Ancient times ===
- Adiabene – an ancient kingdom in Mesopotamia with its capital at Arbil was ruled by Jewish converts during the first century.
- Anilai and Asinai – Babylonian-Jewish chieftains.
- Mahoza – During the beginning of the sixth century Mar-Zutra II formed a politically independent state where he ruled from Mahoza, today in central Iraq, for about 7 years.
- Nehardea – the seat of the exilarch in Babylonia.
- Himyar – there were many Jewish kings at this region of Yemen since 390 CE when a local chieftain named Tub'a Abu Kariba As'ad formed an Empire.
- Kingdom of Semien – a Jewish kingdom in Ethiopia.

=== Medieval times ===
- Khazar Khaganate – an Oghuric Turkic empire that dominated the Eurasian Steppe in the Early Middle Ages and lasted from 650 to 969, its ruling elite converted to Judaism sometime during the 8th century.

=== Modern times ===
- Aba-Sava – a Dagestani semi-independent polity located south of Derbent was founded by Mountain Jews, being relatively autonomous from Persian authority and lasting from 1630 to 1800.
- In 1823, a proposal was put forward by Pavel Pestel and adopted by the Southern Society of the Decembrists for the forceful expulsion of the Jews of the Russian Empire to a "special Jewish state" in Asia Minor if they did not assimilate.
- In 1902, Zionist Max Bodenheimer proposed the idea of the League of East European States, which would entail the establishment of a buffer state (Pufferstaat) within the Jewish Pale of Settlement of Russia, composed of the former Polish provinces annexed by Russia.
- In the early 20th century, Cyprus and El Arish on the Sinai Peninsula in Egypt and its environs were proposed as a site for Jewish settlement by Herzl.
- Several proposals for a Jewish "republic" under Arab or Transjordanian suzerainty were put forward by the Hashemite kings of Hejaz and emirs of Transjordan; the closest these proposals came to fruition was the Faisal–Weizmann Agreement, which proved to be impossible to implement subsequent to the division of the Levant into League of Nations Mandates.
- Jewish autonomy in Crimea – a Soviet proposal in the 1920s and 1930s to create an autonomous region for Jews in Crimea.
- Kimberley Plan — a failed plan by the Freeland League, led by Isaac Nachman Steinberg, to resettle Jewish refugees from Europe in the Kimberley region in Australia before and during the Holocaust.
- Portuguese West Africa – British Member of Parliament Victor Cazalet, during a debate on Palestine in 1938, suggested that wealthy Jews, especially those in America, buy a large block of land in Portuguese West Africa (today Angola), saying that the soil was available and suitable. He also added that there are practically no indigenous or resident populations in that country. The advantage of this is that the Jews there will have control over their own immigration.
- Port Davey, Tasmania, Australia – With the support of the then Premier of Tasmania, Robert Cosgrove (in office from 1939), Critchley Parker proposed a Jewish settlement at Port Davey, in south west Tasmania. Parker surveyed the area, but his death in 1942 put an end to the idea.
- British Guiana – in March 1940, British Guiana (now Guyana) was proposed as a Jewish homeland. However, the British Government decided that "the problem is at present too problematical to admit of the adoption of a definite policy and must be left for the decision of some future Government in years to come".
- Sitka, Alaska – a plan for Jews to settle the Sitka area in Alaska, the Slattery Report, was proposed in 1939 by Harold L. Ickes, U.S. President Franklin Roosevelt's Secretary of the Interior, but it failed to win support either from leaders of the American Jewish community or from Roosevelt. An alternate history of the proposal where Jews do settle in Sitka is the subject of author Michael Chabon's novel The Yiddish Policemen's Union.

==== Contemporary proposals for a second Jewish state ====
Following the creation of the State of Israel, the goal of establishing a Jewish state was achieved. However, since then, there have been some proposals for a second Jewish state, in addition to Israel:

- State of Judea – many Israeli settlers in the West Bank have mulled declaring independence as the State of Judea should Israel ever withdraw from the West Bank. In January 1989, several hundred activists met and announced their intention to create such a state in the event of Israeli withdrawal.

== See also ==
- Andinia Plan
- Halachic state
- Jewish Colonization Association
- Jewish homeland
- Jewish settlement in the Japanese Empire
- Jewish Territorial Organization
- List of Jewish states and dynasties
- History of the State of Palestine
