= Amleto Vespa =

Amleto Vespa (10 April 1884 – between 1941 and 1944) was an Italian mercenary and secret agent of Italian origin, who worked in Manchuria from 1922 to 1940, first for a local warlord, and then for the Empire of Japan. A self-proclaimed fascist and an admirer of Benito Mussolini, Vespa had no admiration for the Japanese administration of Manchukuo, which he described with considerable venom in a book published in 1938.

== Biography ==
Vespa was born in the town of L'Aquila, Abruzzo, as the youngest of five children of Alessandro Vespa, a civil servant and Ginevra Concetta de Chellis, a teacher. Little is known of his early life, aside from what he subsequently wrote in his autobiography, in which he claims to have been born in 1888 to a poor farmer's family, left the Italian countryside in 1910 to fight in the Mexican Revolution against Emiliano Zapata, had been involved in various political intrigues in Eastern Europe and to have married a Polish countess. He also claimed to have traveled extensively in the United States, Australia, French Indochina and in Mongolia. His Italian military service record however shows that he was born in L'Aquila in 1884 and there are no traces in the Mexican archives of an Italian in the front line alongside Madero. Letters to his brother indicate that he left Italy in 1908 for San Francisco and in 1911 traveled to Vladivostok, where he joined the Allied Expeditionary Forces intelligence services.
He met his wife Jeannine (Nina for short) in Vladivostok, where she and her mother, as Russian aristocrats, had fled after the 1917 revolution.

Vespa and his wife moved across the Chinese border to Harbin in 1920, and worked for Manchurian warlord Zhang Zuolin until Zhang's assassination in 1928. The Italian consulate in Tianjin had arrest and deportation orders issued for Vespa, who was accused of smuggling weapons and dealing in drugs on behalf of Zhang. To avoid arrest and deportation, he managed to obtain Chinese citizenship in 1924.

After the Manchurian Incident of 1931, Vespa fled Harbin just ahead of the Kempeitai secret police. His family was captured and eventually freed after Vespa agreed to work for the new Japanese rulers of Manchuria under the name "Commander Feng".

== Secret Agent of Japan ==
Through an Australian reporter, Vespa published an account of his life in Manchukuo in a sensationalist book intended for mass audiences in 1938: Secret Agent of Japan: A Handbook to Japanese Imperialism. According to Vespa, he began to meet with the chief of the Japanese secret service in Manchukuo, a "Japanese Prince" whose name was unknown to him. According to conversations with his Japanese superiors, Vespa reports that the Japanese wanted the colony of Manchukuo to be financially self-supporting. Vespa was instructed to compile reports on wealthy members of Harbin's Jewish community, White Russian and other foreign and Chinese residents. He was also instructed to recruit bandit forces to sabotage the China Far East Railway, which was run by the Soviet government.

Vespa claimed that the Japanese sold monopolies in gambling, prostitution and opium to racketeers to help pay for the conquest of China. In Harbin alone, Vespa counted 172 brothels, 56 opium dens and 194 stores selling narcotics. However, the situation was confused because there were five distinct Japanese security organizations in Manchuria, often at odds with each other, and individual officers sometimes kept for themselves money that was intended to pay for Japanese arms. Vespa sold protection to other racketeers and organized gang raids against rivals of the monopolies.

Vespa mentions that the areas under opium poppy cultivation increased rapidly after 1932, and that from 1937, opium was sent to China, under the guise of military materiels for the Imperial Japanese Army. In localities with no Japanese military detachments, shipments were sent to Japanese consulates. Imperial Japanese Navy vessels transported drugs to towns and cities along China's coastlines and Japanese patrol boats did the same on China's principal rivers. Vespa supposed that these shipments were meant to demoralize enemy troops and reduce their combat effectiveness.

Vespa also reported that many monopolies were awarded to ethnic Koreans. These monopolies included chimney sweeping and supplying Manchukuo flags, which were attempts to extort money from the local population.

=== Kaspé Affair ===
Vespa's book also gives details of the Simon Kaspé kidnapping case. Joseph Kaspé was a prominent Jewish businessman who owned the "Moderne Hotel", the principal hotel in Harbin. His son Simon, a French citizen and a pianist from Paris, was kidnapped while visiting Harbin on 23 August 1933. Those directly responsible were said to be a White Russian gang. When foreign diplomatic pressure obliged the Japanese authorities to arrest the kidnappers, the gang executed Simon Kaspé. Vespa relates the discovery of the mutilated corpse of Simon Kaspé in November 1933 outside Harbin. Vespa recorded a number of other similar cases.

=== Lytton Commission ===
Vespa also reported that Japanese secret agents were instructed to prevent complaints and petitions filed by the local population from reaching the members of the Lytton Commission during their visit. However, despite all these efforts, the Commission nevertheless was able to interview many individuals secretly, and it received many more written submissions which protested against the Japanese authorities.

=== Last years and death ===
His double agency discovered, Vespa managed to take refuge in Shanghai in 1936. His book was published in London in 1938 and had sold very well. He took a trip as a Chinese citizen between Hong Kong and New York in April 1939 under the name Dechellis Vespa and calling himself a journalist. In 1940, he was imprisoned in Shanghai by the Kenpeitai, on accusations of being a spy for the United States, but as an Italian and thus also a citizen of a Japanese ally, he could not be sentenced. Contact with his family ceased after the Pearl Harbor attacks in December 1941.

Amleto and Nina had two children, Italo and Ginevra/Genevieve. After Vespa's disappearance, they moved to the United States. Genevieve joined the League of Nations as an interpreter, while his son became an aeronautical engineer, completely changing his identity.

After the war, Genevieve visited the Italian Embassy in Shanghai and was shown documents informing that her father had been taken prisoner by the Japanese, who took him to Taiwan and executed him there or perhaps in the Philippines. However, together with most of the archive, those documents were destroyed in a mysterious fire inside the embassy shortly after.
