= Inuzuka =

Inuzuka (written 犬塚 lit. "dog mound") is a Japanese surname. Notable people with the surname include:

- Koreshige Inuzuka (犬塚 惟重, 1890–1965), Imperial Japanese Navy officer
- Minoru Inuzuka (犬塚 稔, 1901–2007), Japanese film director and screenwriter
- Tadashi Inuzuka (犬塚 直史, born 1954), Japanese politician
- Yusuke Inuzuka (犬塚 友輔, born 1983), Japanese footballer

== Fictional characters ==
- Kiba Inuzuka, a character in the manga series Naruto
- Ryouhei Inuzuka (犬塚 涼平), a character in the manga series Gender-Swap at the Delinquent Academy
- Kōhei Inuzuka (犬塚 公平), a character in the manga series Sweetness and Lightning
- Kōshi Inuzuka, a character in the manga series Sumomomo Momomo
- Romio Inuzuka, the male main protagonist of the anime and manga series Boarding School Juliet
