= Jews of the Orient =

Jews of the Orient may refer to:

- Mizrahi Jews, the Jewish communities that historically inhabited the Middle East
- East Asian Jews
- Armenians in the Ottoman Empire, an appellation given by Western observers due to the success of some Armenians in commerce
- Overseas Chinese in East Asia

== See also ==
- Middleman minority
