= Norihiro Yasue =

Japanese military officer (1886–1950)

- 安江 仙弘
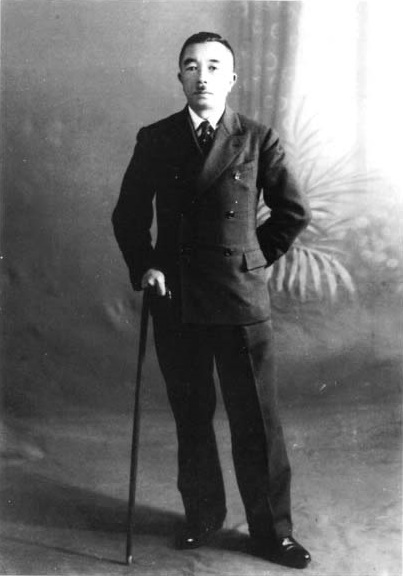
- Born: January 12, 1886; Akita, Akita, Japan
- Died: August 4, 1950 (aged 64); Khabarovsk, Soviet Union
- Military career
- Allegiance: Empire of Japan
- Branch: Imperial Japanese Army
- Service years: 1906–1940
- Rank: Colonel
- Conflicts: Siberian Intervention; World War II

Norihiro Yasue (安江仙弘, Yasue Norihiro; January 12, 1886 – August 4, 1950) was an Imperial Japanese Army colonel who played a crucial role in the Fugu Plan, in which Jews were rescued from Europe and brought to Japanese-occupied territories during World War II. He was known as one of Japan's "Jewish experts", along with Captain Koreshige Inuzuka.

== Life and career ==
Yasue was born in Akita, where his father was a former samurai in the service of Matsumoto Domain, who later served the Meiji government in Taiwan. He graduated from the 21st class of the Imperial Japanese Army Academy, where his classmates included Kanji Ishiwara and Kiichiro Higuchi in May 1905.

At the age of 33, Captain Yasue was assigned as part of the Japanese intervention in Siberia, to aid the Russian White Army in their struggle against the Bolshevik Red Army. A Russian-language specialist, he was assigned to the staff of General Gregorii Semenov, a vehement antisemite who distributed copies of the Protocols of the Elders of Zion to all of his troops, along with weapons and rations. Along with a few dozen other Japanese soldiers, Yasue read and accepted the premises of the Protocols, and would allow this to guide much of his actions and views into the time of the beginning of World War II.

After his return to Japan in 1922, Yasue worked in the Army Intelligence Bureau, translating the Protocols of the Elders of Zion into Japanese, while continuing to speak with Inuzuka and a handful of others about the Jewish problem in Russia. Their group grew quickly, publishing articles in internal army journals, and holding informal lectures and discussion groups. Following the publishing of his translation of the Protocols, Yasue attracted the attention of the Ministry of Foreign Affairs, and was sent in 1926 to Palestine to research the Jewish people. There, he traveled much of the country, and spoke to a variety of people, including noted Jewish leaders such as Chaim Weizmann and David Ben-Gurion, farmers, shopkeepers, and rabbis. He became particularly interested in the emerging kibbutz movement, which he came to believe would be used by the Jews in their colonization of the world; his report to the Ministry, however, revealed that no one he spoke to mentioned anything about a conspiracy.

As war approached in the 1930s, Yasue's influence, and that of his comrades, deepened, particularly among those who were distraught by the lack of respect Japan received on the world stage, and who were wary of the cultural changes that accompanied "progress." It was at this time that Yasue and his "Jewish experts" met the so-called "Manchurian faction," a number of industrialists and military officers who saw Manchuria as crucial to Japan's success. Gisuke Ayukawa in particular was interested in Yasue's ideas, and suggested to him that of using Jews to help develop Manchukuo. Through this partnership, and later discussions, the idea for the "Fugu Plan" was born and developed.

The plan hit a major obstacle almost immediately after it was conceived; two years after the Mukden Incident which spurred the Japanese invasion of Manchuria, a young Jewish man named Simon Kaspe was kidnapped, tortured, and murdered. Jews fled the Manchurian city of Harbin by the thousands; Yasue was placed officially in charge of stemming and reversing this exodus. To that end, he sought out Dr. Abraham Kaufman, a prominent and respected figure among those Jews remaining in Manchukuo. Gradually and carefully earning the respect and friendship of Dr. Kaufman, he helped the doctor form the Far Eastern Jewish Council in 1937, an official body representing the views of the Manchurian Jewish community. Yasue, now promoted to colonel, was assigned to the city of Dairen (now called Dalian), but continued to commute to Harbin to speak with Kaufman and for other meetings and activities related to his plans regarding the Jewish communities.

The Five Ministers' Conference in 1938 provided the formal go-ahead for Yasue and his colleagues to begin setting up a Jewish settlement in Shanghai.

In 1939, Yasue, along with Captain Inuzuka and Shiro Ishiguro of the Ministry of Foreign Affairs, recommended that Japan set up an autonomous Jewish region near Shanghai; by providing a safe place for Jews to live, and granting them the autonomy to live as they desired, the three men hoped to attract more Jews to favor Japan. The three began meeting on a regular basis, either at the Shanghai Consulate, or on board the Izumo anchored in the harbor, just off the Bund. Yasue continued his activities in Harbin at this time, organizing a third Far Eastern Jewish community conference, becoming associated with the president of the South Manchurian Railway, Yosuke Matsuoka, and Setsuzo Kotsuji, the only Japanese in the world at the time to speak and read Hebrew. Yasue also arranged for Abraham Kaufman to be invited to Tokyo on a formal visit.

Over the next few years, Yasue was central to the operations of nearly every aspect of the Fugu Plan. Along with Inuzuka and a handful of others he coordinated everything from choosing and setting up sites for settlements, transporting Jews to the settlements, speaking with Jewish community leaders to gain economic and moral support, and working of course within the bounds granted him by the Japanese government and military. He organized missions to Jewish communities in the United States, and considered the Manchurian Jewish community he wished to create an "Israel in Asia." Suggesting that the organized, localized community they were creating be placed in Manchuria, rather than in Shanghai or other locations preferred by some of his other comrades, Yasue also advocated that the community, while strictly designated geographically, be as autonomous as possible. The most idealistic of the group, according to Marvin Tokayer, Yasue was the most interested in the comfort and benefit of the Jews living there; he likely also believed that restrictions on the community would hamper the Jews' abilities to have the maximum positive influence on Japan's power, and could endanger the benevolent views of the Jewish community towards Japan. Against his wishes, the commander of the China Expeditionary Army ordered that the community be closely supervised and guided, while being made to appear autonomous.

Yasue was summarily dismissed from his post, and from the army, in 1940, as a result of the signing of the Tripartite Pact which formally sealed Japan's alliance with Nazi Germany. Though he remained a representative for the government, and continued to be active to a degree in the execution of the Fugu Plan, he could not formally retain his post as an overt member of a pro-Jewish faction. He immediately flew to Tokyo to urge the government to not allow foreign countries, i.e. Germany, to dictate Japanese policy. Offered reinstatement, he refused. Although Yasue was originally quite antisemitic, Tokayer alleges that he had truly become pro-Jewish around this point. Though he had contributed for a time to various publications on the Jewish situation, including Kokusai Himitsu Ryoku no Kenkyu (国際秘密力の研究, Studies in the International Secret Power), under the pen-name Hokoshi, he ceased participating in such things upon his dismissal.

By 1942, the Fugu Plan fell apart. Japanese aid for Jews would not be tolerated by Japan's ally, Nazi Germany, and Japanese attempts to shuttle Jews through Russia were halted when Russia became an enemy of Germany and Japan. That same year, Gestapo chief Josef Meisinger was sent to Shanghai and began preparations to exterminate the population of the Shanghai Ghetto. This never came to fruition, as the community appealed to Yasue and others who revealed Meisinger's intentions to the government in Tokyo and saw it prevented entirely.

An advisor to the government of Manchukuo during the war, based in Dairen, Yasue became less and less involved in the Fugu Plan in any official capacity. He did, however, maintain contacts, and some involvement with the Jewish community in Shanghai which had been formed as a result of his actions. When the Soviet Union invaded Manchukuo in August 1945, just prior to the surrender of Japan and the end of the war, Yasue did not attempt to flee the mainland. He arranged a formal farewell to his family, in which he expressed his view that his entire generation was to blame for the war, and its outcome. He did not feel it would be honorable to flee from his responsibility, and so he allowed himself to be captured by the Soviet forces. Yasue died in 1950, in a labor camp in Khabarovsk.

== Beliefs and ideology ==
Yasue is often incorrectly portrayed in Western media as a believer in the Protocols of the Elders of Zion, since he translated them into Japanese in the early 1920s. Actually, Japan's White Russian neighbors were highly anti-Semitic and, according to Kaufman, Yasue translated the Protocols with the intent of understanding the Russian image of Jews.

By 1940 or so, he had developed close relationships with a number of Jews, and with the Shanghai Jewish community in general, and became one of their strongest advocates. Though he may or may not have continued to believe in the racial and cultural ideas expressed in the Protocols, he also felt quite strongly for the happiness and safety of the Jewish people who lived in the Empire of Japan.
