= Harbin Old Synagogue Concert Hall =

Concert hall in Harbin, China

Harbin Old Synagogue
- Concert Hall
- Interactive map of Harbin Old Synagogue
- Address: 82 Tongjiang Street, Daoli District; Harbin; China
- Coordinates: 45.77164763°N 126.61490619°E
- Capacity: 108
- Type: Concert hall

Construction
- Opened: 1909-present
- Years active: 1909-1963 (as Harbin Synagogue); 1963-2013 (under Harbin Railway Bureau); 2013-present (as Concert Hall)
- Architect: H. A. Kazy-Kirei

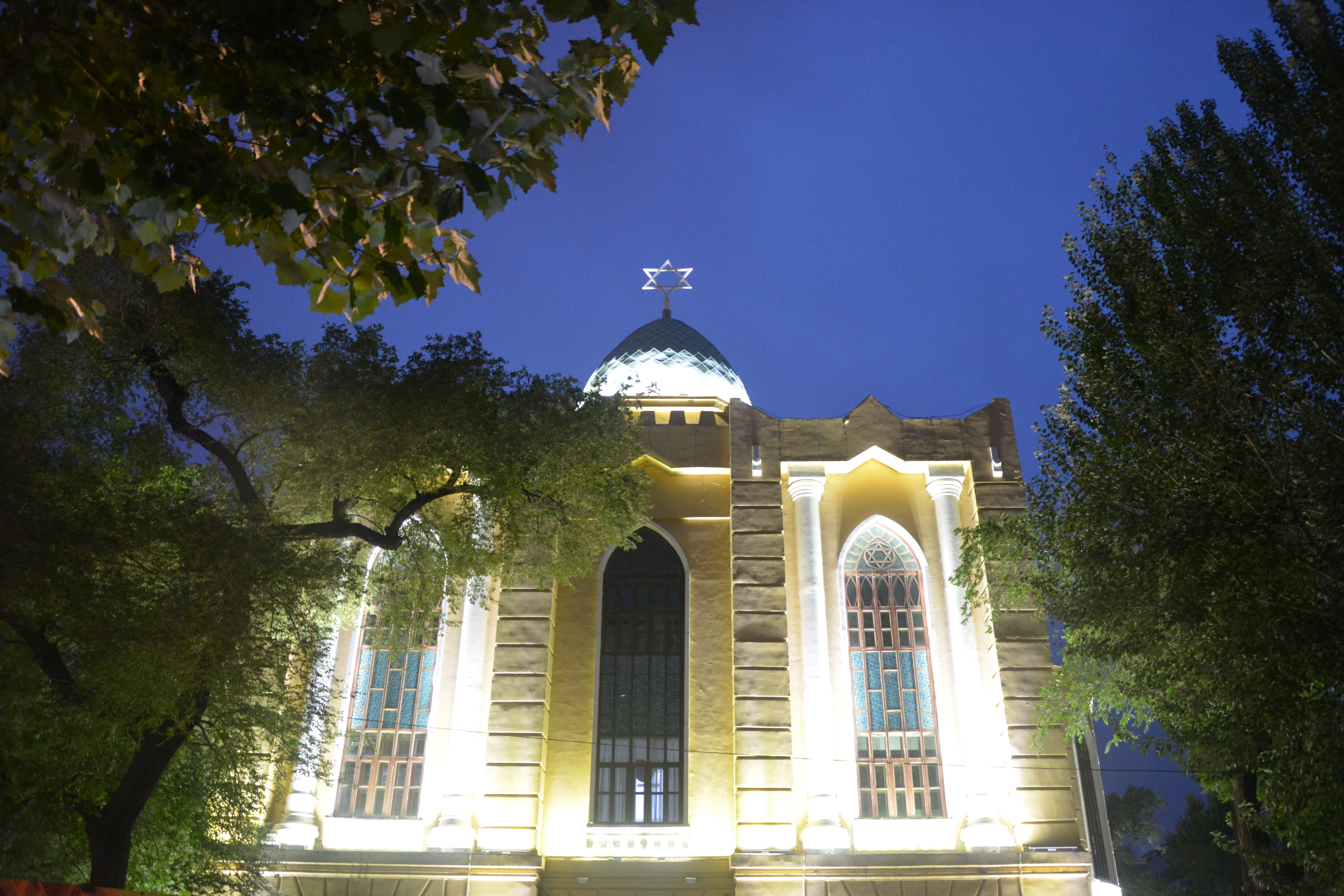
Harbin Old Synagogue Concert Hall at night

The Harbin Old Synagogue Concert Hall (Chinese: 哈尔滨老会堂音乐厅; pinyin: Hā'ěrbīn Lǎohuìtáng Yīnyuètīng) is a concert hall in Harbin, Heilongjiang Province, China, and formerly the old synagogue of Harbin from 1909 to 1963. Upon its renovation in 2014, it was reopened as a major concert hall in the city.

== History ==
The city of Harbin was home to thousands of Jews. The number of Jewish diasporas living in Harbin was over 20,000 in the 1920s, making Harbin the largest gregarious center for Jews in the Far East. On 15 January 1909, the hall opened as Harbin General Synagogue (哈尔滨犹太总会堂), the main Jewish religious site for the city. The former Jewish middle school was adjacent to the synagogue, whose site is still well preserved and was transferred into a music school.

In June 1931, the building was devastated by a great fire and was refurbished.

Abraham Kaufman, then leader of Harbin Jewish community, was working in the synagogue from 1919 to 1945.

In 2013, over 1 billion Chinese yuan was spent by Harbin municipal government on the refurbishment of the building and transfer to a music hall. The hall reopened in 2014.

== Architecture ==
In May 2013, the building was listed National Key Protected Building.

== Cultural events ==
A series of concerts are held in the hall all over the year.

A nostalgic bookstore is on the third floor of the hall.
