= Kenneth X. Robbins =

American psychiatrist & art collector

Kenneth X. Robbins is a psychiatrist, collector of south Asian art, and author known for his studies of expatriate communities in Asia. In 1990, Robbins donated a collection of materials relating to India to the Smithsonian Institution. He received his B.A. from Columbia University in 1963 and M.D. from the New York University School of Medicine.

== Selected publications ==
- "The Sculpture of India, 3000 B.C.-1300 A.D." in Arts of Asia, 15:5, pp. 100–9. (1985)
- Maharajas, nawabs & other princes beyond number- from the Robbins Collection of the Indian princely states: Exhibition guide. Golden Lotus Press, 1991.
- African Elites in India: Habshi Amarat. Mapin Publishing, 2006. ISBN 978-1890206970 (Editor with John McLeod)
- Western Jews in India: From the Fifteenth Century to the Present. Manohar Publishers, 2013. ISBN 978-8173049835 (Editor with Marvin Tokayer)
- Jews and the Indian National Art Project. Niyogi Books, 2015. ISBN 978-9383098545 (Editor with Marvin Tokayer)
