= Jewish settlement in the Empire of Japan =

Event that largely occurred around World War II

Jewish settlement in the Empire of Japan began as early as the mid-19th century, but was confined to relatively small numbers of Jewish immigrants from Europe and Russia. Shortly prior to and during World War II, and coinciding with the Second Sino-Japanese War, tens of thousands of Jewish refugees were resettled in the Empire of Japan. The onset of the European war by Nazi Germany involved the large-scale persecution and genocide of Jews, later known as the Holocaust, resulting in thousands of Jewish refugees fleeing east. Most ended up in Japanese-occupied China.

Popular accounts of the resettlement plan have resurfaced in the 21st century on Chinese social media as an antisemitic conspiracy theory against China.

== The memoranda ==
Memoranda written in 1930s Imperial Japan proposed settling Jewish refugees escaping Nazi-occupied Europe in Japanese-controlled territory. As interpreted by Marvin Tokayer and Mary Swartz (who used the term "Fugu Plan" that the Japanese employed to describe this plan), they proposed that large numbers of Jewish refugees should be encouraged to settle in Manchukuo or Japan-occupied Shanghai, thus gaining the benefit of the supposed economic prowess of the Jews and also convincing the United States, and specifically American Jewry, to grant political favor and economic investment into Japan. The idea was partly based on the acceptance of The Protocols of the Elders of Zion as being a genuine document by at least part of the Japanese leadership - but rather than arousing hatred of Jews, the intended effect of the Protocols, they actually caused the Japanese to consider the Jews as powerful potential allies for Japan.

The detailed scheme included how the settlement would be organized and how Jewish support, both in terms of investment and actual settlers, would be garnered. In June and July 1939, the memoranda "Concrete Measures to be Employed to Turn Friendly to Japan the Public Opinion Far East Diplomatic Policy Close Circle of President of USA by Manipulating Influential Jews in China" and "The Study and Analysis of Introducing Jewish Capital" came to be reviewed and approved by the top Japanese officials in China.

Methods of attracting both Jewish and American favor were to include the sending of a delegation to the United States, to introduce American rabbis to the similarities between Judaism and Shinto, and the bringing of rabbis back to Japan in order to introduce them and their religion to the Japanese. Methods were also suggested for gaining the favor of American journalism and Hollywood.

The majority of the documents were devoted to the settlements, allowing for the settlement populations to range in size from 18,000, up to 600,000. Details included the land size of the settlement, infrastructural arrangements, schools, hospitals etc. for each level of population. Jews in these settlements were to be given complete freedom of religion, along with cultural and educational autonomy. While the authors were wary of affording too much political autonomy, it was felt that some freedom would be necessary to attract settlers, as well as economic investment.

The Japanese officials asked to approve the plan insisted that while the settlements could appear autonomous, controls needed to be placed to keep the Jews under surveillance. It was feared that the Jews might somehow penetrate into the mainstream Japanese government and economy, influencing or taking command of it in the same way that they, according to the forged Protocols of the Elders of Zion, had done in many other countries. The world Jewish community was to fund the settlements and supply the settlers.

== History ==
=== Before World War II ===
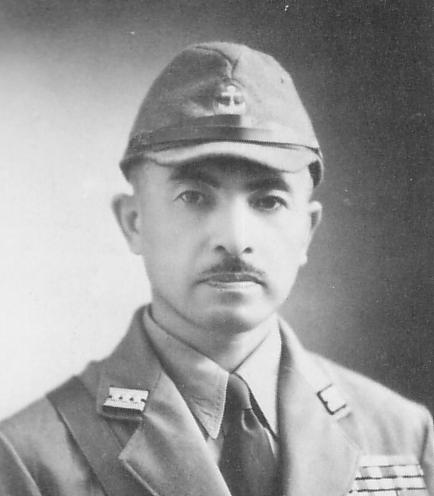
Koreshige Inuzuka

Small groups of Baghdadi and Russian Jewish merchants are known to have resided in Japan since at least the Perry Expedition in the middle of the 19th century, with one Jew even being named Honorary Consul of Japan to Australia.^{:175} By 1884, a Jewish community existed in Nagasaki with a synagogue of their own; by 1904 the city was home to one hundred Jewish families. The Jewish community in Yokohama was also sizable at the time, providing accommodation for refugees from Imperial Russia.^{:162–165}

The idea for a population to be established in Manchukuo (otherwise known as Manchuria) and help build Japan's industry and infrastructure there was advanced by a small group whose primary members included Captain Koreshige Inuzuka and Captain Norihiro Yasue, who became known as "Jewish experts", the industrialist Yoshisuke Aikawa and a number of officials in the Kwantung Army, known as the "Manchurian Faction".

Their decision to attract Jews to Manchukuo came from a belief that the Jewish people were wealthy and had considerable political influence. Jacob Schiff, a Jewish-American banker who, thirty years earlier, offered sizable loans to the Japanese government which helped it win the Russo-Japanese War, was well known. After the war, he attended a personal audience with Emperor Meiji and became the first foreigner to be awarded the Order of the Rising Sun.^{:176} As a possible sign of gratitude, the Japanese ambassador to the United States, petitioned by the American Jewish community, guaranteed the humane treatment of Jewish prisoners captured during the war.^{:163} In addition, a Japanese translation of The Protocols of the Elders of Zion led some Japanese authorities to grossly overestimate the economic and political powers of the Jewish people, and their interconnectedness across the world due to the Jewish diaspora. It was assumed that by rescuing European Jews from the Nazis, Japan would gain unwavering and eternal favor from American Jewry. However, this was not always the case. Anti-Semitic sentiments were first introduced to Japan following Russia's 1917 Bolshevik Revolution and civil war. Through the cooperation and communication of Japanese and White Army officers, the Jewry and the Bolsheviks became synonymous for the former as symbols of revolution and a threat to imperial rule.^{176–178} In the following decade, European literature on the Jews, including both scientific and antisemitic works, first reached Southeast Asia. The Japanese public, only having access to a limited volume of information on the world's Jewry and often unable to differentiate between accurate and sensationalized sources, developed an exoticized and exaggerated image of the Jewish people.^{168–170}

In 1922, ultranationalist officers Yasue and Inuzuka had returned from the Japanese Siberian Intervention, aiding the White Russians against the Red Army where they first learned of the Protocols and came to be fascinated by the alleged powers of the Jewish people. This led them to conclude that, while posing a significant threat to the Japanese Empire, the Jewish people could be allied with, whereupon they could use their immense influence on the world stage to assist Japan in resolving its economic and social issues.^{:193–199} Over the course of the 1920s, they wrote many reports on the Jews, and traveled to the British Mandate of Palestine to research the subject and speak with Jewish leaders such as Chaim Weizmann and David Ben-Gurion. Yasue translated the Protocols into Japanese. The pair managed to get the Foreign Ministry of Japan interested in the project. Every Japanese embassy and consulate was requested to keep the ministry informed of the actions and movements of Jewish communities in their countries. Many reports were received but none proved the existence of a global conspiracy.

In 1931, the officers joined forces to an extent with the Manchurian faction and a number of Japanese military officials who pushed for Japanese expansion into Manchuria, led by Colonel Seishirō Itagaki and Lieutenant-Colonel Kanji Ishiwara just before the Mukden Incident.

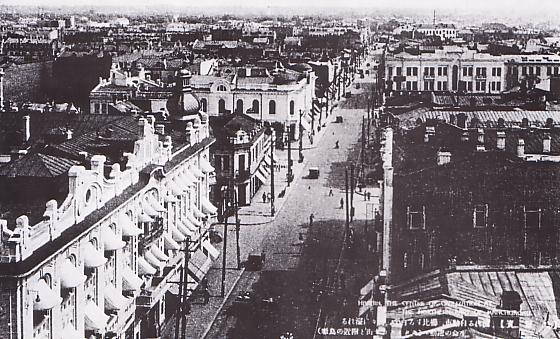
Harbin, before 1945

Of Harbin's one million population, Jews represented only a tiny fraction. Their numbers, as high as 13,000 in the 1920s, had halved by the mid-1930s in response to economic depression and after events relating to the kidnapping and murder of Simon Kaspé by a gang of Russian Fascists and criminals under the influence of Konstantin Rodzaevsky.

Although Russian Jews in Manchukuo were given legal status and protection, the half-hearted investigation into Kaspé's death by the Japanese authorities, who were attempting to court the White Russian community as local enforcers and for their Anti-Communist sentiments, led the Jews of Harbin to no longer trust the Japanese army. Many left for Shanghai, where the Jewish community had suffered no antisemitism, or deeper into China. In 1937, after Yasue spoke with Jewish leaders in Harbin, the Far Eastern Jewish Council was established by Abraham Kaufman, and over the next several years, many meetings were held to discuss the idea of encouraging and establishing Jewish settlements in and around Harbin.

In March 1938, Lieutenant General Kiichiro Higuchi of the Imperial Japanese Army proposed the reception of some Jewish refugees from Russia to General Hideki Tojo. Despite German protests, Tojo approved and had Manchuria, then a puppet state of Japan, admit them.

On December 6, 1938, Prime Minister Fumimaro Konoe, Foreign Minister Hachirō Arita, Army Minister Seishirō Itagaki, Naval Minister Mitsumasa Yonai, and Finance Minister Shigeaki Ikeda met to discuss the dilemma at the "Five Ministers' Conference". They made a decision of prohibiting the expulsion of the Jews in Japan, Manchuria, and China. On the one hand, Japan's alliance with Nazi Germany was growing stronger, and doing anything to help the Jews would endanger that relationship. On the other hand, the Jewish boycott of German goods following Kristallnacht showed the economic power and global unity of the Jews.

Shanghai in 1930s

As an immediate result of the Five Ministers' Conference, 14,000–15,000 Eastern European Jews were granted asylum in the Japanese quarter of Shanghai; the European quarters, in contrast, admitted almost no Jews. 1000 Polish refugees who had not been able to obtain visas for any country were also given asylum in Shanghai.

The next few years were filled with reports and meetings, not only between the proponents of the plan but also with members of the Jewish community, but was not adopted officially. In 1939, the Jews of Shanghai requested that no more Jewish refugees be allowed into Shanghai, as their community's ability to support them was being stretched thin. Stephen Wise, one of the most influential members of the American Jewish community at the time and Zionist activist, expressed a strong opinion against any Jewish–Japanese cooperation.

=== During World War II ===
In 1939, the Soviet Union signed a non-aggression pact with Nazi Germany, making the transport of Jews from Europe to Japan far more difficult. The events of 1940 only solidified the impracticality of executing the Fugu Plan in any official, organized way. The USSR annexed the Baltic states, further cutting off the possibilities for Jews seeking to escape Europe. The Japanese government signed the Tripartite Pact with Germany and Italy, eliminating the possibility of any official aid for the plan from Tokyo.

Despite this, the Japanese Consul in Kaunas, Lithuania, Chiune Sugihara, began to issue transit visas to escaping Jews against orders from Tokyo. These allowed them to travel to Japan and stay for a limited time on their way to their final destination, the Dutch colony of Curaçao. The so-called Curaçao-visa were issued by the Dutch consul Jan Zwartendijk, who went against the consular guidelines to give the Jewish refugees a means of escape. Thousands of Jews received visas from Sugihara and Zwartendijk, or through similar means. Some even copied, by hand, the visa that Sugihara had written. After receiving exit visas from the Soviet government, many Jews were allowed to cross Russia on the Trans-Siberian Railway, taking a boat from Vladivostok to Tsuruga and eventually settling in Kobe, Japan.

By the summer of 1941, the Japanese government was becoming anxious about having so many Jewish refugees in such a major city, and near major military and commercial ports. It was decided that the Jews of Kobe had to be relocated to Shanghai, occupied by Japan. Only those who had lived in Kobe before the arrival of the refugees were allowed to stay. Germany had violated the Non-aggression Pact, and declared war on the USSR, making Russia and Japan potential enemies, and therefore putting an end to the boats from Vladivostok to Tsuruga.

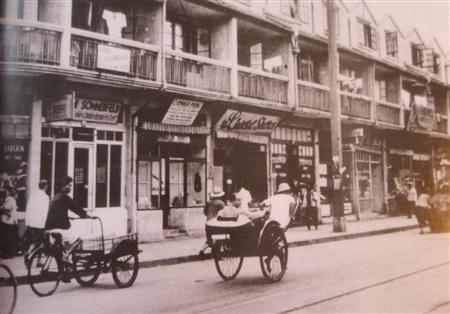
"Shanghai ghetto" around 1943

Several months later, just after the attack on Pearl Harbor in December 1941, Japan seized all of Shanghai. Monetary aid and all communications from American Jews ceased due to the Anglo-American Trading with the Enemy Act and wealthy Baghdadi Jews, many of whom were British subjects, were interned as enemy nationals. The US Department of Treasury was lax regarding communications and aid sent to the Jewish refugees in Shanghai, but the American Jewish organizations provided aid.

In 1941, the Nazi Gestapo Obersturmbannführer (Lt. Col.) Josef Meisinger, the "Butcher of Warsaw", acting as the Gestapo's liaison with the German Embassy in Tokyo and the Imperial Japanese Army's own Kenpeitai military police and security service, tried to influence the Japanese to "exterminate" or enslave approximately 18,000–20,000 Jews who had escaped from Austria and Germany and who were living in Japanese-occupied Shanghai. His proposals included the creation of a concentration camp on Chongming Island in the delta of the Yangtze or starvation on freighters off the coast of China. The Japanese admiral who ran Shanghai would not yield to pressure from Meisinger. However, the Japanese built a ghetto in the Shanghai neighborhood of Hongkew (which had already been planned in Tokyo in 1939), a slum with about twice the population density of Manhattan, which remained strictly isolated by Japanese soldiers under the command of the official Kanoh Ghoya, and which Jews could only leave with special permission. Some 2,000 Jews died in the Shanghai ghetto. The Japanese government did not accept Meisinger's requests.

Jews entering and residing in Japan, China, and Manchukuo were treated the same as other foreigners and, in one instance, Japanese officials in Harbin ignored a formal complaint by the German consulate which was deeply insulted by one of the Russian-Jewish newspapers' attack on Hitler. In his book, "Japanese, Nazis and Jews", Dr. David Kranzler states Japan's position was ultimately pro-Jewish.

During the six months following the Five Minister's Conference, lax restrictions for entering the International Settlement, such as the requirement for no visa or papers of any kind, allowed 15,000 Jewish refugees to be admitted to the Japanese sector in Shanghai. Japanese policy declared that Jews entering and residing in Japan, China, and Manchukuo would be treated the same as other foreigners.

From 1943, Jews in Shanghai shared a "Designated Area for Stateless Refugees" of 40 blocks along with 100,000 Chinese residents. Most Jews fared as well, often better than other Shanghai residents. The ghetto remained open and free of barbed wire and Jewish refugees could acquire passes to leave the zone. However, it was bombed just months before the end of the war by Allied planes seeking to destroy a radio transmitter within the city, with the consequential loss of life to both Jews and Chinese in the ghetto.

== Japan's support of Zionism ==
Japanese approval came as early as December 1918, when the Shanghai Zionist Association received a message endorsing the government's "pleasure of having learned of the advent desire of the Zionists to establish in Palestine a National Jewish Homeland". It indicated that, "Japan will accord its sympathy to the realization of your [Zionist] aspirations."

This was further explicit endorsement in January 1919 when Chinda Sutemi wrote to Chaim Weizmann in the name of the Japanese Emperor stating that, "the Japanese government gladly takes note of the Zionist aspiration to extend in Palestine a national home for the Jewish people and they look forward with a sympathetic interest to the realization of such desire upon the basis proposed." Japan recognized British policies in Palestine in return for British approval of Japanese control over the Shandong Peninsula in China.

Influential Japanese intellectuals including Uchimura Kanzō (1861–1930), Nitobe Inazō (1862–1933), Kenjirō Tokutomi (1868–1927) and professor in colonial policy at Tokyo University, Tadao Yanaihara (1893–1961), were also in support. "The Zionist movement", stated Yanaihara, "is nothing more than an attempt to secure the right for Jews to migrate and colonize in order to establish a center for Jewish national culture", defending the special protection given to the Jews in their quest for a national home based on his conviction that, "the Zionist case constituted a national problem deserving of a nation-state". He saw the Zionist project, including the cooperative modes of agricultural settlements, as a model Japan might emulate.

A high-level Japanese government reports on plans for mass emigration to Manchuria in 1936 included references to ethnic conflict between Jews and Arabs in Palestine as scenarios to avoid. By 1940, Japanese-occupied Manchuria was host to 17,000 Jewish refugees, most coming from Eastern Europe.

Yasue, Inuzuka and other sympathetic diplomats wished to utilize those Jewish refugees in Manchuria and Shanghai in return for the favorable treatments accorded to them. Japanese official quarters expected American Jewry influence American Far Eastern policy and make it neutral or pro-Japanese and attract badly needed Jewish capital for the industrial development of Manchuria.

Post-war, the 1952 recognition of full diplomatic relations with Israel by the Japanese government was a breakthrough amongst Asian nations.

== Significance ==
Approximately 24,000 Jews escaped the Holocaust either by immigrating through Japan or living under direct Japanese rule by the policies surrounding Japan's more pro-Jewish attitude.^{:563} While this was not the 50,000 expected, and those who arrived did not have the expected wealth to contribute to the Japanese economy, the achievement of the plan is looked back upon favorably. Chiune Sugihara was bestowed the honor of the Righteous Among the Nations by the Israeli government in 1985. In addition, the Mir Yeshiva, one of the largest centers of rabbinical study today, and the only European yeshiva to survive the Holocaust, survived as a result of these events.

Koreshige Inuzuka's help in rescuing Jewish refugees from Nazi-occupied Europe was acknowledged by the Union of Orthodox Rabbis of the United States which saved him from being tried as a war criminal. He went on to establish the Japan-Israel Association and was president until his death in 1965.

== Popular accounts ==
There is little evidence to suggest that the Japanese had ever contemplated a Jewish state or a Jewish autonomous region, unlike the Soviet Union which had already established the Jewish Autonomous Oblast in 1934. In 1979, Rabbi Marvin Tokayer and Mary Swartz authored a book called The Fugu Plan. In this partly fictionalized account, Tokayer and Swartz gave the name the 'Fugu Plan' to the 1930s memorandums. They stated that the plan, which was viewed by its proponents as risky but potentially rewarding for Japan, was named after the Japanese word for puffer-fish, a delicacy which can be fatally poisonous if incorrectly prepared. Tokayer and Swartz base their claims on Japanese Foreign Ministry documents and the testimony of Japanese Jews and surviving relatives of Japanese military officials. They allege that such a plan was first discussed in 1934 and then solidified in 1938, supported by notables such as Inuzuka, Ishiguro Shiro and Norihiro Yasue; however, the signing of the Tripartite Pact in 1940 and other events prevented its full implementation.

Ben-Ami Shillony, a professor at the Hebrew University of Jerusalem, said that the statements upon which Tokayer and Swartz based their claim were taken out of context, and that the translation with which they worked was flawed. Shillony's view is further supported by Kiyoko Inuzuka (wife of Koreshige Inuzuka). In The Jews and the Japanese: The Successful Outsiders, he questioned whether the Japanese ever contemplated establishing a Jewish state or a Jewish autonomous region.

=== 21st century ===
Articles and posts that interpreted the Fugu Plan as an antisemitic conspiracy theory against China have gone viral on Chinese social media. Political blogger Sima Nan's Weibo channel spread the notion that Jews colluded with the Empire of Japan to establish a Jewish homeland in mainland China during the Second Sino-Japanese War.

== See also ==
- Abraham Kaufman, a prominent Zionist in Harbin
- Michael Kogan
- Antisemitism in Japan
- Birobidzhan, a Stalin-era founded city for Jews in Soviet territory, bordering Manchukuo's Sanjiang Province
- Chiune Sugihara, a Japanese diplomat who assisted Lithuanian Jews in escaping Nazi persecution
- East Asian Jews
- Hakko Ichiu
- Makuya, a Japanese-based faith initiative closely linked with Judeo-Christian beliefs and values
- Shōwa period
- Dachau-Austria death march, halted by Nisei U.S. Army troops
- History of the Jews in Japan
- History of Jews in Kobe
- History of the Jews during World War II
- Israel–Japan relations
- Racial Equality Proposal
- Slattery Report, an American proposal to bring Jewish refugees to Alaska
- Proposals for a Jewish state and territorialism
- Uganda Scheme

== Sources ==
- Eber, Irene. Wartime Shanghai and the Jewish refugees from Central Europe: survival, co-existence, and identity in a multi-ethnic city (Walter de Gruyter, 2012).
- Gao Bei. Shanghai Sanctuary: Chinese and Japanese Policy toward European Jewish Refugees during World War II (Oxford University Press, Oxford, 2013)
  - Shillony, Ben-Ami. (review). The Journal of Japanese Studies 40.2 (2014): 413–417.
- Goodman, David. Jews in the Japanese Mind. Free Press, 1994, ISBN 0-02-912482-4.
- Kase Hideaki, Nihon no naka no Yudayajin.
- Levine, Hillel. In Search Of Sugihara: The Elusive Japanese Diplomat Who Risked His Life To Rescue 10,000 Jews from the Holocaust, University of Michigan, ISBN 0-684-83251-8.
- Pallister, Casey J. Japan's Jewish "Other": Antisemitism in Prewar and Wartime Japan. University of Oregon.
- Sakamoto, Pamela Rotner. Japanese Diplomats and Jewish Refugees: A World War II Dilemma, Praeger Publishers, 1998, ISBN 0-275-96199-0.
- Shillony, Ben-Ami. Politics and Culture in Wartime Japan, Oxford University Press, 1991.
- Shillony, Ben-Ami. "Defending Japan's Pacific War: The Kyoto School Philosophers". The Journal of Japanese Studies – Volume 32, 2006.
- Shillony, Ben-Ami. Politics and Culture in Wartime Japan. Oxford: Clarendon Press, 1981.
- Sugita Rokuichi, Higashi Ajia e kita Yudayajin.
- Tokayer, Rabbi Marvin; Mary Swartz (1979). The Fugu Plan: The Untold Story of the Japanese and the Jews During World War II. Paddington Press. ASIN: B000KA6NWO.
- Tokayer, Rabbi Marvin; Mary Swartz (2004). The Fugu Plan: The Untold Story Of The Japanese And The Jews During World War II. Gefen Publishing House; 1st Gefen Ed edition. ISBN 965-229-329-6. Archived from the original on 2024-09-03.
- Inuzuka Kiyoko, Kaigun Inuzuka kikan no kiroku: Yudaya mondai to Nippon no kōsaku (Tokyo: Nihon kōgyō shimbunsha, 1982).
