= British Uganda Programme =

1903 plan for a Jewish homeland in British East Africa

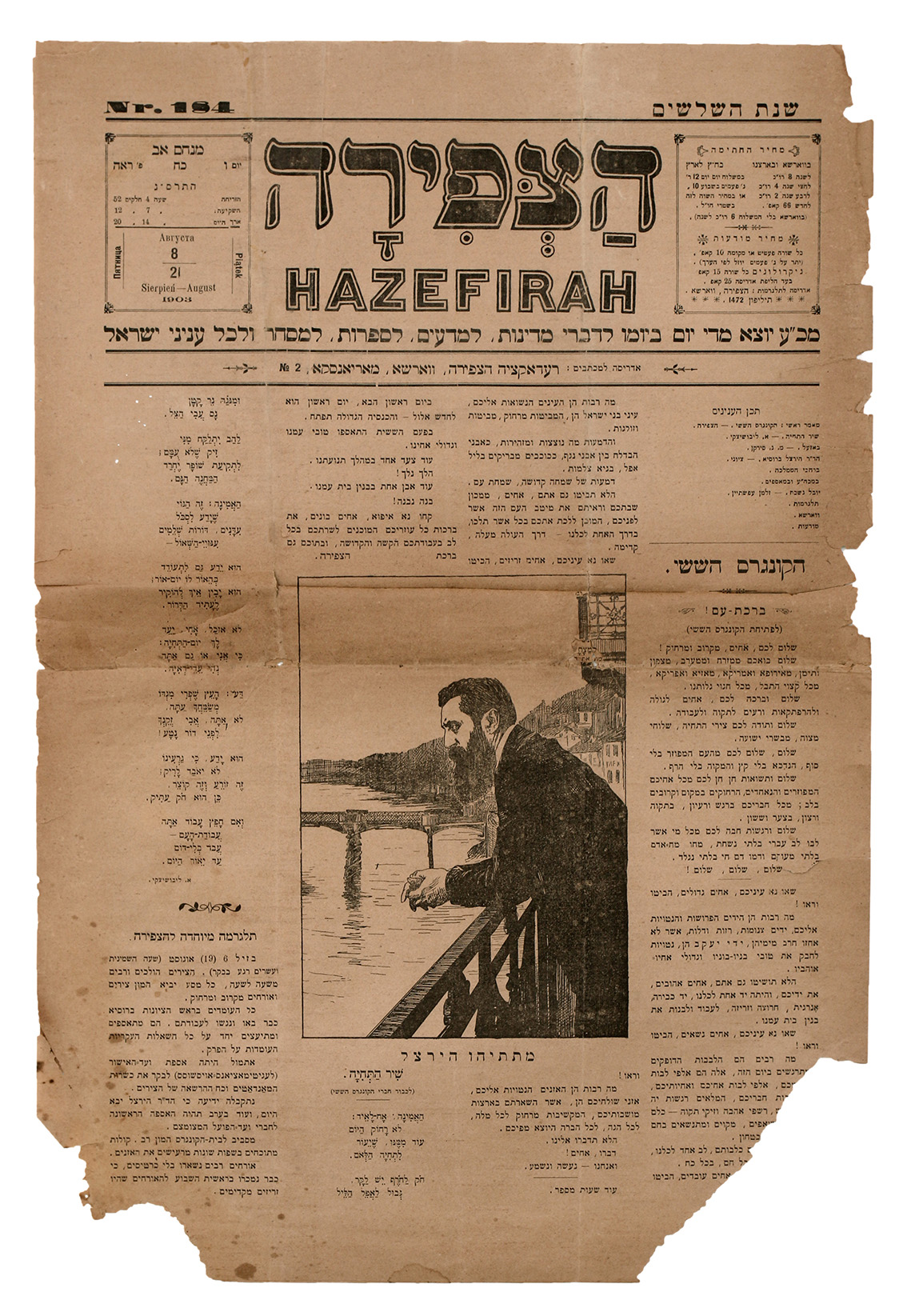
A Ha-Tsfira newspaper with a greeting on the occasion of the opening of the sixth Zionist Congress and an illustration of Theodor Herzl on the balcony of the "Hotel Les Trois Rois" in Basel, 1903.

The British Uganda Programme, also known as the Uganda Scheme, was a 1903–05 proposal by the British Empire to establish a semi-autonomous Jewish territory in British East Africa. Conceived during the height of European imperial expansion, the plan emerged from Britain's strategic interests in developing the East Africa Protectorate and offsetting the financial burdens of the newly built Uganda Railway. It was promoted to Theodor Herzl by Colonial Secretary Joseph Chamberlain as a potential refuge for Jews fleeing antisemitic violence in Eastern Europe, particularly following the Kishinev pogrom.

The scheme provoked intense debate within the Zionist movement, challenging the primacy of Palestine as the focus of Jewish national aspirations. Herzl presented the Uganda Scheme at the Sixth Zionist Congress, which was divided on the proposal but authorized a commission to assess the territory. Widespread opposition from both Zionist delegates and white settlers in East Africa ultimately led to the withdrawal of the offer in 1905. The controversy marked a decisive moment in Zionist politics, contributing to the emergence of territorialist ideas, even as the movement reaffirmed its commitment to a Jewish homeland in Palestine.

== Background ==
=== East Africa protectorate and the British interests ===
The British Empire participated in the scramble for Africa to protect a range of interests, including maintaining commercial dominance, suppressing the East African slave trade, securing key routes to India, and competing with Germany and France for influence. In East Africa, the British chose to exert indirect control through the Imperial British East Africa Company (IBEA), funded by William Mackinnon in 1888 and administered primarily by Frederick Lugard, George Wilson and other imperial officers involved in regional expeditions.

Despite significant investment, the IBEA was effectively bankrupt by mid-1895. Poor infrastructure, chronic financial instability, large debts, and weak management contributed to its collapse. Consequently, the British government declared a protectorate over the region and transferred administration to the Foreign Office. Seeking to unlock the commercial potential of the interior, the British built the Uganda Railway, which ultimately cost taxpayers £5,244,000. However, the railway failed to generate the anticipated economic returns. This shortfall, combined with the expense of the Second Boer War in South Africa, intensified concerns within the Foreign Office, leading officials to view increased European immigration to the protectorate as a possible solution.

=== "Just the country for Dr. Herzl" ===
Joseph Chamberlain, Secretary of State for the Colonies, and Zionist leader Theodor Herzl were acquainted through the Rothschild brothers. Initially, Herzl proposed a plan to Chamberlain for Jewish settlement in Cyprus, the Sinai Peninsula, or El Arish on the coast of the Sinai. However, Chamberlain deemed these impractical because the territories were either inhabited or not under British control. Nevertheless, he agreed to discuss El Arish with Lord Lansdowne, the Foreign Secretary, believing that doing so could help secure the support of world Jewry for Britain. Chamberlain left London in December 1902 to tour South Africa, stopping in Mombasa before continuing on to South Africa.

After a warm welcome, British settlers complained to Chamberlain that the Foreign Office had failed to attract a significant number of hardworking settlers, which in turn hindered the profitability of Uganda Railway. During a journey on the railway through what was called "the white man country" in modern Kenya, Chamberlain's view of the region's tropical climate and its suitability for European settlement changed. He remarked that it "would be just the country for Dr. Herzl," and even proposed the idea of a Jewish homeland in East Africa to Herzl. He did not pursue the matter further, however, assuming Herzl's interest remained focused on Palestine or nearby.

=== Initial negotiations ===
Initially, Herzl had little interest, as his focus was on Palestine and its surrounding area. However, following the Kishinev pogrom in 1903, he redoubled his efforts to secure a Jewish homeland. Leopold Greenberg acted as Herzl's main representative in the negotiations, and together they hoped to gain de facto diplomatic recognition from Britain, which gave the proposal's considerable political weight. Although East Africa's held neither moral nor historical significance for Jews, the scheme appeared more promising than alternatives under consideration. Greenberg successfully obtained a letter from the Foreign Office expressing the British government's willingness to establish a Jewish colony with considerable land, local autonomy, and religious and domestic freedom under its oversight. At the Sixth Zionist Congress held in Basel in 1903, Herzl presented the proposal, and the Congress voted, with 295 delegates in favor and 178 against, to send a fact-finding group to East Africa.

=== Reaction to the offer ===
Herzl's announcement sparked a heated debate that challenged fundamental beliefs and sparked passionate reactions. Some delegates viewed it as a betrayal of the Basel Program and a conflict between Palestine and Uganda. The discord threatened to divide the organization, with some Eastern European delegates dramatically walking out of the meeting and others expressing their loss of trust in Herzl and the steering committee. The emotional tension remained high, with some delegates falling on each other's necks, weeping, and a young student fainting. However, Herzl reassured delegates that Palestine would remain Zion and threatened to resign, preventing the organization's division. Though he believed the attachment to Palestine was remarkable, he thought the reaction was unreasonable. "These people have a rope around their necks, but they still refuse," Herzl commented. Despite concerns about the East Africa scheme, the Jewish World was willing to take the risk, particularly in light of the Kishinev incident. However, some members, such as Reverend Dr. Moses Gaster and Lucien Wolf, strongly opposed the plan, believing it went against the principles of Zionism and was an unwise experiment with Jewish self-government.

The Zionists' proposal was met with equal controversy in the British colony. The white British settlers were openly hostile toward the offer and formed the "Anti-Zionist Immigration Committee," which rejected the proposal through the African Standard. They believed that British poor people deserved the land more than the Jews and expressed concerns about how the black natives would react to the Jewish immigrants. Furthermore, there were worries about granting a special territory to an alien community after the troubles in Canada with the Doukhobors, and doubts about Jews' ability to engage in profitable farming. The British media also joined in the objection, amplifying these concerns. The response of the native population to the offer is unknown, and the Indians who came to build the Uganda Railway did not entirely reject the proposal.

=== The Zionist expedition to East Africa ===
In December 1904, the Zionist Organization dispatched a special commission to Uasin Gishu to assess whether the region's conditions were suitable for Jewish settlement. The commission consisted of Major Alfred St Hill Gibbons, a British veteran of the Boer War and noted explorer; Alfred Kaiser, a Swiss orientalist and advisor to the Northwest Cameroon Company; and Nachum Wilbush, a Zionist engineer. Although their final reports differed, particularly whether the climate was suitable, the Plan was ultimately rejected in 1905, largely due to the opposition by the former high commissioner of East Africa and from white settlers in the area. As a result, the British withdrew the offer.

=== Implications of the offer ===
The Plan was a significant turning point in Zionist history. Although it was rejected in 1905, it paved the way for the rise of territorialist ideology and the creation of the Jewish Territorial Organization (ITO). The ITO stressed the pressing need to find a solution to condition of European Jewry, even if it meant giving up the return to the Land of Israel.

== In fiction ==
- In 1890, Theodor Hertzka published Freeland: A Social Anticipation, a novel which predated the Uganda Scheme by twelve years but built on many similar themes. In the book, Jewish adventurers work alongside Kenyans to build an egalitarian society in the Kenyan Highlands.
- The story of the 1904 expedition, as well as an imagined vision of a Jewish state in Uasin Gishu, is told in Lavie Tidhar's novelette "Uganda", in his 2007 collection HebrewPunk. This is also a theme in Tidhar's 2018 novel Unholy Land, in which a Jewish state called Palestina is established in Africa after the 1904 expedition returns a positive report. Unholy Land was shortlisted for several awards, including the Sidewise Award for Alternate History.
- Adam Rovner's "What If the Jewish State Had Been Established in East Africa", a travel guide for the fictional Jewish homeland of New Judea, located in present-day Uganda, won the 2016 Sidewise Award for Alternate History award for short form alternate history. According to Adam Rovner the plan was appealing to early Zionists as it "twinned the adventures of [Henry Morton] Stanley with the adventurism of the Age of Empire, stagecraft with statecraft."
- Another alternate history treatment is Yoav Avni's novel Herzl Amar, הרצל אמר (Herzl Said) in which the Jewish state in East Africa is called Israel and has many features similar to the actual Israel: it has a big city called Tel Aviv, its army is called the Israeli Defence Forces, its Prime Minister in the 2010s is Ariel Sharon and the opposition leader is Shimon Peres; at its south, near the border with Tanzania, is an impoverished strip similar to the Gaza Strip, dotted with refugee camps of Masai tribesman who were earlier displaced from the more central parts of the country and who like Palestinians are seething with rebellion against Israeli rule. But a highly significant difference from actual history is that, though there had been an antisemitic German leader named Adolf Hitler, the Second World War ended in an Allied victory much sooner than in actual history and European Jews were spared the Holocaust.

== See also ==
- History of the Jews in Uganda
- Proposals for a Jewish state
- Abayudaya, a Jewish community in eastern Uganda
- Madagascar Plan, the Nazi plan to re-settle European Jews in Madagascar
- Jewish Autonomous Oblast, federal subject in the far east of Russia
- Slattery Report, included a proposal to move European refugees to Alaska
- Fugu Plan, plan to resettle European Jews in Japanese-controlled areas
- Beta Israel, Jewish diaspora group in Ethiopia
- Lemba people, African population with ancestry from Semitic peoples
- Jewish Colonization Association
- Rwanda asylum plan, UK government plan to move asylum seekers to Rwanda

== Bibliography ==
- Weisbord, Robert G, and Mazal Holocaust Collection. African Zion: The Attempt to Establish a Jewish Colony in the East Africa Protectorate, 1903-1905. [1st ed.] ed., Jewish Publication Society of America, 1968
- Rovner, Adam (2014). In the Shadow of Zion: Promised Lands Before Israel. NYU Press. ISBN 978-1-4798-1748-1.
