= East Asian Jews =

Jewish communities have existed in East Asia for centuries. Even as the majority of the Jewish people settled in western Asia, Europe, and America, some traveled to eastern Asia and settled. Today, due to the increasing ease and decreasing price of communications and transportation, as well as other effects of globalization, the Jewish communities in China, Japan, and other places continue to grow.

== China ==
Jewish settlers are documented in China as early as the 7th or 8th century AD, but they may have arrived during the middle of the Han dynasty, or even as early as 231 BC. Relatively isolated communities developed from the Tang and Song dynasties (7th to 12th centuries AD) to the Qing dynasty (19th century), the Kaifeng Jews comprised the most notable of these communities (in a restricted sense, the term "Chinese Jews" is often used in reference to these communities). By the time of the establishment of the People's Republic of China in 1949, few if any native Chinese Jews were known to have maintained the practice of their religion and culture. In the late 20th and early 21st centuries, however, some international Jewish groups have helped Chinese Jews rediscover their heritage.

In the 19th and early 20th centuries, Jewish immigrants from around the world arrived in China with Western commercial influences, particularly in the commercial centers of Hong Kong, which was for a time a British colony, Shanghai (the International Settlement and French Concession), and Harbin (the Trans-Siberian Railway). In the first half of the 20th century, thousands of Jewish refugees escaping from the 1917 Russian Revolution and the Holocaust in Europe arrived in China. However a majority of them immigrated to Israel and various western countries after the communist takeover in 1949.

== Korea ==
The Jewish presence in South Korea effectively began with the outbreak of the Korean War in 1950. At this time a large number of Jewish soldiers, including the chaplain Chaim Potok, came to the Korean Peninsula. Today the Jewish community is very small and limited to the Seoul Metropolitan Area. There have been very few Korean converts to Judaism. In North Korea however, the presence of a Jewish community remains unknown.

== Japan ==
The first confirmed contacts between the Japanese and people of Jewish ancestry began during the Age of Discovery (16th century) with the arrival of European travelers and merchants (primarily the Portuguese and Dutch). However, it wasn't until 1853, with the arrival of Commodore Matthew Perry following the Convention of Kanagawa ending Japan's "closed-door" foreign policy that Jewish families began to settle in Japan. The first recorded Jewish settlers arrived at Yokohama in 1861 establishing a diverse community consisting of 50 families (from various Western countries) as well as the building of the first synagogue in Japan. By 1957 there were only 15 Jewish families left in Yokohama.

During World War II, Japan was regarded as a safe refuge from the Holocaust, despite being a part of the Axis and an ally of Germany. During World War II, Jews trying to escape Poland could not pass the blockades near the Soviet Union and the Mediterranean Sea and were forced to go through the neutral country of Lithuania (which was occupied by belligerents in June 1940, starting with the Soviet Union, then Germany, and then the Soviet Union again).

Currently, there are several hundred Jewish families living in Tokyo, and a small number of Jewish families in Kobe and Yokohama. A small number of Jewish expatriates of other countries live throughout Japan, temporarily, for business, research, a gap year, or a variety of other purposes. There are occasionally Jewish members of the United States armed forces serving on Okinawa and in the other American military bases throughout Japan.

== Mongolia ==
Jewish presence in Mongolia started in the late 19th century, when Jewish traders settled in from Russia. In June 1921, the already small Jewish population of Mongolia were killed under the orders of Russian Baron Roman von Ungern-Sternberg. Today, the Jewish population of Mongolia is extremely small in number. There is no synagogue in Mongolia, although Israeli businessman Yair Jacob Porat’s home serves as a makeshift synagogue.

== See also ==
- Jewish diaspora
- Jewish ethnic divisions
- Jews of color
- History of the Jews in Africa
- History of the Jews in China
  - Kaifeng Jews
  - Shanghai Ghetto
- History of the Jews in Japan
  - History of the Jews in Kobe
  - Jewish settlement in Imperial Japan
  - Fugu Plan
- History of the Jews in Central Asia
- History of the Jews in Mongolia
- History of the Jews in India
- Jewish Autonomous Oblast
- List of Asian Jews
