= Marvin Tokayer =

American rabbi

Marvin Tokayer (born 1936) is an American rabbi and author who served as a United States Air Force chaplain in Japan. He was later advised by the Lubavitcher Rebbe to return to Japan where he served for eight years as the only rabbi in the country. Tokayer currently serves as a rabbi in Great Neck, New York.

== Career ==
In 1971, Tokayer published a book in Japanese entitled 5,000 Years of Jewish Wisdom: Secrets of The Talmud. The book, written in only three days, was translated into Japanese and sold over a million copies. It was later translated into Korean and has sold over two million copies in South Korea. Tokayer aided Kazuo Ueda's efforts to learn Yiddish, and Ueda later became Japan's leading Yiddishist.

South Korean designer Rejina Pyo recalls reading Tokayer's Talmudic tales as a child, saying the stories about kindness, truth, and determination have always stayed with her. Tokayer has written 20 books in Japanese. He has researched the history of the Jews in China and Japan, including the role that the Japanese played in helping victims of the Holocaust. In the book The Fugu Plan published in 1979, Tokayer with co-writer Mary Swartz, wrote about how two Japanese officials helped the Jews in Lithuania escape to Japan before World War II.

In the 2010s, Tokayer collaborated with Kenneth X. Robbins in editing studies of expatriate communities in Asia. Tokayer has supported efforts to increase the knowledge of General Hideki Tojo and General Kiichiro Higuchi efforts to 20,000 Jews that the Soviet Union intended to send back to Germany.

Tokayer currently serves as a rabbi in Great Neck, New York.

== Selected publications in English ==
- The Fugu Plan. Paddington Press, 1979. (with Mary Swartz)
- Western Jews in India: From the Fifteenth Century to the Present. Manohar Publishers, 2013. ISBN 978-8173049835 (editor with Kenneth X. Robbins)
- Pepper, Silk & Ivory: Amazing Stories about Jews and the Far East. Gefen, 2014. ISBN 978-9652296474 (with Ellen Rodman)
- Jews and the Indian National Art Project. Niyogi Books, 2015. ISBN 978-9383098545 (editor with Kenneth X. Robbins)

== Honours ==
- Japan : The Consul General’s commendation (2014)
- Japan : The Order of the Rising Sun, Gold and Silver Rays (2017)
