= Tondemo-bon =

Tondemo (トンデモ, Tondemo) means "outrageous" or "preposterous" + bon (本, hon) "book" in Japanese. Recently the word has gained another meaning thanks to the activity of Togakkai (the Academy of Tondemo books) which annually award Nihon Tondemo-bon Taisho (Japan Tondemo Book Award), which is similar to the Golden Raspberry Award or the Ig Nobel Prize. Tondemo-bon is defined by the academy as "something amusing from a perspective that differs from what the author intends". The award covers not just conspiracy theory or pseudoscience but also includes historical revisionism as well as sceptics who make biased attacks toward the former. The members of Togakkai included religious figures as well as scientists and other academics. In Japan, this genre has superseded similar activities of scientific sceptics.

== Togakai tondemobon taisho winners ==
Here is a list of winners of the Nihon Tondemo-bon Taisho (Japan Tondemo Book Award):

- Ninja, Its Origin and Technique(「忍者のラビリンス」) by Amano Jin, an ostensibly scholarly exploration of the history of ninja techniques, including the secret magical hand gestures
- Winner in 2001 was,Amazing Science Fiction Weapons(「奇想天外SF兵器) by Kei yoshio, a notoriously poorly researched book detailing the weapons and plots of science fiction series
- Winner in 2000 was A Final Warning from Mother Earth(大地からの最終警告」) by Hiromichi Yamashita, a guide to the future based on the knowledge of the ancients of Atlantis and other civilizations

== See also ==
- Conspiracy theory
- UFO conspiracy theory
- Hollow Earth
- Pseudoscience
