= History of the Jews in Kobe =

The history of the Jews in Kobe, Japan, is recorded from the 19th century onwards.

== Jews and Kobe ==
Kobe (神戸市, Kōbe-shi) is a port city in the Kansai region of Japan on the main island of Honshū. An important city throughout Japanese history, Kobe also has a significant Jewish history. Already housing a modest Jewish community by the start of World War II, Kobe existed as a safe haven for thousands of Jews fleeing Europe during 1940 and 1941. At its height, the Jewish community of Kobe had thousands of residents, two synagogues, and recognition from the Japanese government. After World War II, however, the community became greatly diminished and remains extremely small today.

== Early history ==
Jews started coming to Japan in the 1860s, when Japan was opened to trade. There quickly evolved a small population of Jewish businessmen in Kobe, along with the other port cities of Yokohama and Nagasaki. By the early 1900s (decade), there existed a Zionist organization and well established Jewish community in Kobe, and the city received its first synagogue in 1912. So, when trade with Russia declined in Nagasaki prior to the Russo-Japanese War and the great Kanto earthquake struck Yokohama in 1923, the majority of the Jewish population in Japan ended up in Kobe. As a trickle of Jewish immigrants continued, by the start of World War II Kobe had a well-off Jewish community of about 1000 people and 50 families. As one scholar puts it, "Kobe was the center of what little Jewish life existed in Japan at that time. The community, which numbered several dozen families, was composed primarily of Sephardim originally from Iraq and Iran, and Ashkenazim who had originally lived in Russia." This Jewish community of Kobe, which came to be known as JEWCOM, its cable address, was treated without prejudice by the Japanese government. A Japanese official stated in 1922, "The number of Jews in Japan is comparatively small. We treat them the same as we treat all foreigners. We do not distinguish between them." Such an attitude towards Jews was rare in the world at that time, and would prove to be lifesaving for the community in Kobe. As the world became more antisemitic and the Nazis began their plans to annihilate the Jews in Europe, Kobe would serve as a safe haven for thousands of refugees fleeing the Holocaust.

== Jacob Schiff ==
While it is clear that the Japanese played great hosts to the Jewish refugees in Kobe, it is less obvious that exceptional treatment of the Jews was no accident. Beyond the simple compassion of the general public, the government had far more calculated reasons for being hospitable to the Jews. First, there was a feeling of indebtedness to the Jewish people, as the financier of the Russo-Japanese War was a Jewish New York City banker by the name of Jacob Schiff. Japan needed money to fight the war in 1904, and few banks in Europe were willing to take such a risky venture. No one thought Japan had a chance to defeat Russia, a major Western power. Schiff, however, agreed to grant Japan loans that amounted to over $200 million, when no one else would help. This money led to Japan's victory and after the war, Schiff was treated like a hero in Japan and became the first foreigner to receive the Order of the Rising Sun from the emperor. Therefore, the Japanese already had a quite favorable impression of Jews, as Schiff was a symbol of international Jewish wealth and power and the Japanese felt indebted to him.

== Arrival in Japan ==
In the early stages of World War II, Kobe unexpectedly started to receive the thousands of Jewish refugees coming from Europe to Japan at a rapid pace. The migrants came from several areas under Nazi rule, including Germany, Austria, and Poland. Arriving between July 1940 and September 1941, these Jews were greeted in Japan by the local communities. Usually arriving by ship to the Japanese port city of Tsuruga via Vladivostok, Russia, delegates of JEWCOM from Kobe gave the refugees a warm welcome and paid for the transport from Tsuruga to Kobe. This was a great relief for the refugees, especially the Polish Jews, who had just finished a 6,000 mile journey across Asia and had little to support themselves.

However, a rapid influx of over 4,600 refugees needing food and shelter was no easy task for a modest Jewish community to deal with. About 1,000 refugees were able to secure transit to other parts of the world, but the rest stayed in Kobe and help was required from American organizations and the Japanese government to deal with the Europeans trying to escape persecution.

== Sugihara Visas ==
The first major problem the refugees ran into involved their visas. The wave of Polish refugees was able to get to Japan only through a bizarre and incredibly lucky set of coincidences. As Poland was divided up between Germany and the Russians in 1939, many Jews had to flee and chose Lithuania as their destination. As thousands of Polish Jews began to descend on the capital city of Kovno, leaders of the community started frantically looking for consulates that would grant a visa and thus provide asylum from the incoming Russians. After being turned away by the U.S., British-run Palestine, and nearly every other desirable location, the Polish Jews found an answer in the Japanese consulate.

In July 1940, the Dutch consul in Kovno, Jan Zwartendijk, started issuing visas to the Dutch island of Curaçao to any Polish citizen who needed them. It was not so much a visa, but a note in the passport that no visa was required to enter the island. This was in fact only half true, the local governor had to give permission to enter, which he almost never did. People who got the "Curaçao visa" could not travel westwards to reach the island, but had to travel east through Russia and Siberia towards the Pacific. They then turned to the Japanese consul Chiune Sugihara to give them a transit visa through Japan. Sugihara was a gifted Japanese diplomat who was well qualified to complete his primary objective of spying on the Russians, was met with a delicate situation when a group of Jews arrived at his consulate requesting a transit visa. These Jews had little money and were missing the documents normally required for a visa, but were clearly helpless and Sugihara knew they would perish without his help. After long debate, Sugihara took a stance against his foreign ministry and began to issue necessary documents for travel through Japan to any Jew who came to him. The Dutch and Japanese consulates in Kovno was closed shortly after the war began to escalate, but in a few months time Sugihara and Zwartendijk issued thousands of visas that undoubtedly saved the lives of the Polish Jews who received them. Now called the "Japanese Schindler", Sugihara's heroics have been honored many times, including the highest honor that Israel gives to those who helped Holocaust survivors.

Unfortunately for the recipients, many of these Sugihara visas were valid for little more than travel across Russia and a 14-day stay in Japan. The final destination of Curaçao in the Caribbean was put on paper because it did not require an entry visa, but no one ever really intended to reach the island. To make matters worse, many of the Jews who escaped from Lithuania to Japan had forged Sugihara visas. This was all very clear to the Japanese officers who inspected the Polish refugees’ papers at Tsuruga, and a solution had to be reached if the Jews were to avoid deportation from Japan.

JEWCOM officials knew the gravity of the situation, and turned to Setsuzo Kotsuji, a bible scholar and Japanese "Jewish expert". Kotsuji was a friend of the Jews, and personally appealed to foreign minister Yosuke Matsuoka on behalf of the Jews of Kobe. A conclusion was reached that the central government would ignore the forged and expired visas if the local Kobe police would accept such a decision and let their city welcome thousands of refugees. Kotsuji then obtained 300,000 yen, no small amount, to bribe the Kobe police and get them to approve the extension of the Polish visas. Thus, the first major hurdle in the Jews of Kobe surviving the Holocaust was surmounted.

== Life in Kobe ==
Once it became clear that Kobe would be a safe place to stay, if only for a few months, the refugees began to settle into the city. Considering the conditions the Jews had just fled and would soon face in Shanghai, life in Kobe was by all accounts exceptional. In fact, almost every Jew in Kobe was able to live comfortably for their duration there, and their lives resembled that of tourists rather than refugees. As one survivor remarked, "We were tourists. When we were in Japan, we were tourists. My parents weren't working as such, I mean certainly not making an income, and we would travel to various places. Went to Kyoto, I remember that. We went to resorts. We walked, went in the mountains. I mean there are a lot of photographs that tourists take of themselves in front of various shrines or Buddhas or whatnot."

Such a comfortable situation existed for several reasons. First, JEWCOM was a well-organized group that had its primary goal from 1940 to 1941 as the procuring of food, shelter, and security for every Jew in Kobe. This was made possible by ample funding from the American Jewish Joint Distribution Committee, or the JDC, a group that funded rescue efforts for Jews throughout the war. Additional funding supplemented that of the JDC from the Vaad Hatzala, a relief organization similar to the JDC but only focusing on Orthodox Jews.

After funds were secured for JEWCOM, the question of whether the Jews could live comfortably or not was left up to how they were treated by their Japanese hosts. This treatment could not have been much better. First, the Japanese public helped welcome, along with JEWCOM officials, most boats of refugees coming into Japan in Tsuruga. They bestowed gifts upon the newcomers to Japan and in Kobe, the Jews almost had extraterritoriality. The Japanese government referred all dealings with refugees to JEWCOM officials, and even ignored many petty crimes like littering and shoplifting by the Jewish residents. Almost every survivor's account of Kobe recalls the delightfully compassionate nature of the Japanese public. "There was no anti-Semitism to the refugees in Kobe, only compassion and kindness," recalls one survivor, while the president of JEWCOM remarked, "Japan is the first free country [the refugees] have reached, and its representatives abroad have shown so much humane feeling to our unfortunate fellow countrymen that we can only express our appreciation." There are also several instances of the kindness of the Japanese towards Jewish residents that have been recorded. One letter came to JEWCOM headquarters from a Japanese farmer who had heard there were over sixty children among the refugees, and that he would be honored if he could give some of the fruit he was growing as a gift to the children. In another case, a local Kobe doctor refused to accept money for treatment of a child upon finding out he was a Jewish refugee. These random acts of kindness made the refugees truly comfortable, and many Japanese said how bad they felt for the Jews. The Jewish community in Kobe was also able to practice their religion fully, and had two functioning synagogues. The Japanese even helped with the importation of matzo for Passover in 1941. Furthermore, the Mir yeshiva, which was among the Polish refugees and became the only European yeshiva to remain intact after the war, was given a building to continue their Torah studies. These Orthodox Jews aroused much curiosity in the Japanese people, and after investigation an official admired the group's "holy idealism." Thus, the favorable treatment of the Jews made life in Kobe in 1940 and 1941 surprisingly pleasant.

== The Fugu Plan ==
The high regard for Jews that Schiff started was still in the minds of Japanese when they invaded Manchuria in 1931. In Manchuria, the city of Harbin had a considerable Russian Jewish population who had fled persecution in their homeland. Many of these Jews were successful businessmen and engineers. The notion of skilled Manchurian Jews was coupled with years of antisemitic doctrines being passed along to Japan through the West were particularly influential. Given the growing number of Jewish refugees in Europe and the Japanese perception of their ability to be successful and influence governments, pro-Jewish memorandums were discussed to court Jews of the world and settle them in Manchuria in order to develop local industry. In addition, its authors hoped that Jews would repay the Japanese for their kindness by helping them as Schiff had and influencing their powerful brethren in the U.S. and Britain to develop pro-Japanese policies.

Nazis appeals to the Japanese government to adopt harsher policies towards the Jews were denied outright by the Japanese, and on December 31, 1940, Japanese Foreign Minister Matsuoka stated, "I am the man responsible for the alliance with Hitler, but nowhere have I promised that we would carry out his antisemitic policies in Japan. This is not simply my personal opinion, it is the opinion of Japan, and I have no compunction about announcing it to the world." leading the Japanese to defend the Jews and refuse to adopt antisemitic policies.

== Conclusion ==
As Pearl Harbor approached, the atmosphere in Kobe began to change. Japanese authorities were nervous about any foreigners in Japan, and Kobe had an obvious foreign population. The decision was made that any Jews who had not lived in Kobe prior to the war were to be deported to Shanghai and the port was cleared out in preparation for war. Leaving comfortable life in Kobe came as unwelcome news to many of the refugees, but most still recognized they would be able to survive the war and was thankful for their position away from the Holocaust in Europe. So, almost as quickly as it began the flourishing Jewish community of Kobe was sent to Shanghai where it remained for the duration of the war. However, for a little under a year, Kobe served as an oasis in a world of terror. Through a series of unlikely coincidences, thousands of people who surely would have perished in their homelands were able to live comfortably in a time of war. A testament to the relatively excellent conditions for Jews in Kobe, only two refugees died among the thousands during the duration of Kobe's wartime Jewish community. Today, a small Jewish community lives on in Kobe, and is the oldest in Japan. Though most remnants of Jewish life have faded away, the Ohel Shelomo Synagogue from 1912 remains and is a reminder of the city's Jewish past. Compassionate Japanese hosts, as well as organized and well financed Jewish aid, made the Jews of Kobe some of the most fortunate in the world during World War II.

== See also ==
- Chiune Sugihara
- Fugu Plan
- Kobe
- Shanghai ghetto
- Adolf (manga)

== Sources ==
- Iwry, Samuel. To Wear the Dust of War: an Oral History. Ed. L.j. H. Kelley. New York: Palgrave Macmillan, 2004.
- Kranzler, David. Japanese, Nazis, and Jews: The Jewish Refugee Community of Shanghai. New York: Yeshiva University Press, 1976
- Melamed, Leo. Interview with U.S. Holocaust Memorial Museum. Polish Jewish Refugees in the Shanghai Ghetto. 1999. 15 April 2007.<http://www.ushmm.org/wlc/oi_fset.php?lang=en&ModuleId=10005588&ArticleId=36&MediaId=5242>.
- Sakamoto, Pamela. Japanese Diplomats and Jewish Refugees. London: Praeger Publishers, 1998
- Shillony, Ben-Ami. The Jews and the Japanese: The Successful Outsiders. Tokyo: Charles E. Tuttle Company, 1991
- Zuroff, Efraim. The Response of Orthodox Jewry in the United States to the Holocaust; the Activities of the Vaad Hatzala Rescue Committee 1939–1945. New York: Yeshiva University Press, 2000.
