= Koreshige Inuzuka =

Japanese naval officer (1890–1965)

- 犬塚 惟重
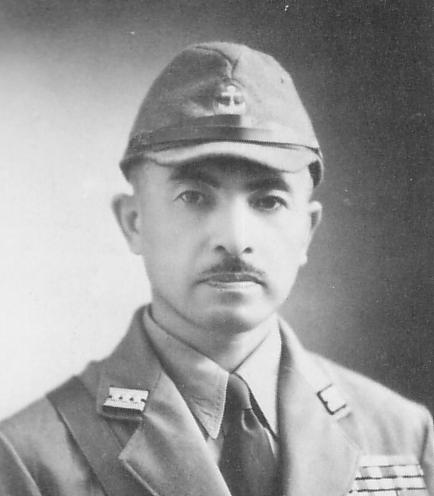
- Born: July 11, 1890; Tokyo, Japan
- Died: February 19, 1965 (aged 74)
- Military career
- Allegiance: Empire of Japan
- Branch: Imperial Japanese Navy
- Service years: 1911–1945
- Rank: Captain
- Conflicts: World War I Siberian Intervention; Second Sino-Japanese War; World War II

Captain Koreshige Inuzuka (犬塚 惟重, Inuzuka Koreshige; 11 July 1890 – 19 February 1965) was the head of the Japanese Imperial Navy's Advisory Bureau on Jewish Affairs from March 1939 until April 1942. Unlike his Imperial Japanese Army counterpart, Colonel Yasue Norihiro, he believed strongly in the Protocols of the Elders of Zion; these beliefs led him to think that attracting Jews to settle in Japanese-controlled Asia was in the Empire of Japan's best interests.

== Biography ==
=== Early life ===
Inuzuka was born in Tokyo as the eldest son of a former samurai retainer of Saga Domain. His official residency was in Saga Prefecture. A graduate of a middle school affiliated with Waseda University, he entered military service and graduated from the 39th class of the Imperial Japanese Navy Academy in 1911. He went on to the Navy Staff College and served on a number of vessels, including the Hizen, cruisers Kasuga, Yakumo, Kitakami, Kiso, and Nisshin.

=== World War I ===
During World War I, Inuzuka was stationed in the Mediterranean Sea, with the Japanese expeditionary force sent to Malta as part of Japan's contribution to the Allied war effort under the Anglo-Japanese Alliance. After the war, he was stationed off the coast of Vladivostok during the Siberian Intervention to aid the White Russians against the Bolshevik Red Army. It was there that he first heard of and read the Protocols of the Elders of Zion, a powerful anti-Semitic document detailing a Jewish worldwide conspiracy. The document was forged and distributed by Russian General Gregorii Semenov, a leader of the White forces.

In 1922, after returning to Japan, Inuzuka began to gather a coterie of sympathetic officers who believed in the Protocols. This group of so-called 'Jewish-experts' slowly became larger and more outspoken over the next several years. The group published many documents detailing their thoughts on the Jewish conspiracy, including lists of known Jews, and a Japanese translation of the Protocols, written by Yasue. After serving as a military attaché to France, Inuzuka served on the battleship Fuji and cruiser Kuma.

=== As a Jewish expert ===
As war with China approached in the 1930s, Inuzuka came to support the 'Manchurian faction,' a number of military men who believed that control of Manchuria was crucial to Japan's survival. Inuzuka was stationed in Shanghai from November 1934, came upon the idea of enticing Jews to settle in Manchukuo and to help build infrastructure there. Not only would they bring engineering knowledge and creative energy, but Jews living in Manchukuo would bring Japan favor from the United States and other Western nations. Inuzuka believed that gaining the favor of the Jewish people was crucial, as the Jews, in his mind, controlled the world markets.

The Five Ministers' Conference in 1938 provided the formal go-ahead for Inuzuka and his colleagues to begin setting up a Jewish settlement in Shanghai.

In 1939, Inuzuka, along with Colonel Yasue and Ishiguro Shiro of the Foreign Ministry, recommended that Japan set up an autonomous Jewish region near Shanghai; by providing a safe place for Jewish refugees from Nazi Germany to settle, and granting them the political and economic autonomy to live as they desired. In a report to his superiors that year, Inuzuka compared the Jews to fugu, the famous poisonous fish delicacy that if not prepared correctly could turn lethal. Thus, Inuzuka's plans regarding the Jews came to be known as the Fugu Plan.

Inuzuka, fluent in English, Russian, and French, visited countless schools and synagogues, discussing Jewish problems and seeking aid or support from Jewish communities and organizations. He helped form the Pacific Trading Company, a joint Jewish-Japanese endeavor, and met with many of East Asia's top Jewish leaders, both religious and financial.

Over the next few years, Inuzuka was central to the operations of nearly every aspect of the Fugu Plan. Along with Yasue and a handful of others he coordinated everything from choosing and setting up sites for settlements, transporting Jews to the settlements, speaking with Jewish community leaders to gain economic and moral support, and working of course within the bounds granted him by the Japanese government and military. By 1942, however, the Plan fell apart. Japanese aid for Jews would not be tolerated by Japan's ally, Nazi Germany, and Japanese attempts to shuttle Jews through the Soviet Union were halted when Germany launched its invasion of Russia.

In 1941, Inuzuka's help in rescuing Jewish refugees from Nazi Europe was acknowledged and Inuzuka was granted a silver cigarette case by the Union of Orthodox Rabbis of the United States; the interior of the case bore an inscription thanking Inuzuka for his services to the Jewish people. He was transferred by the Navy to the Philippines in 1943, and after the war, the cigarette case saved him from being tried as a war criminal. The case was later donated to Yad Vashem, the Holocaust Memorial in Jerusalem.

Inuzuka established the Japan-Israel Association (日本イスラエル教会, Nihon Isuraeru Kyoukai) in 1952, which contained primarily ex-military men. He was president of the Association until his death in 1965.

== Beliefs and ideology ==
The Protocols, in reality an antisemitic Tsarist fabrication, speak of a worldwide Jewish conspiracy, and of the incredible economic and political power of the Jewish people. Thus, even as he believed them quite dangerous, Inuzuka believed that convincing the Jewish people to favor Japan would bring Japan great economic rewards. Under the pen name Utsunomiya Kiyo, he published a book in 1939 discussing Jewish history in regard to Japan, and describing his belief that, since Palestine was closed to Jewish settlement by the British and Arabs, Jews would seek to return to their Oriental heritage somewhere else.

He also contributed anonymously to the monthly journal Kokusai Himitsu Ryoku no Kenkyu (国際秘密力の研究, Studies in the International Secret Power), which was funded by the Foreign Ministry and German Embassy.
