= Simon Kaspé =

1933 murder victim

Simon Kaspé (1909–1933) was a Russian Jewish resident of Harbin, Manchuria who was kidnapped, ransomed, tortured, and murdered by a gang of fascist criminals under the influence of exiled White Russian leader Konstantin Rodzaevsky. The halfhearted investigation into his disappearance and death by the Japanese authorities, who were courting the White Russian community as local enforcers and fomenting their anticommunism, sparked anti-Japanese sentiment among the Jewish community of Manchukuo and the flight of nearly 70% of the Jews of Harbin.

Kaspé was the son of Joseph Kaspé, owner of Harbin's Hôtel Moderne along with most of the city's cinemas and theaters. Joseph Kaspé fled persecution in Russia, moving to Harbin in 1907. Originally stateless, he obtained French citizenship for his family. Simon Kaspé grew up in Harbin, regularly traveled to France to study at the Paris Conservatory, and was an accomplished pianist.

== Kidnapping and murder ==
In August 1933, Simon Kaspé, home from the Conservatory for summer vacation, was kidnapped as he returned from an outing with his girlfriend. His attackers approached from behind, seized him, and took him to a site some 36 miles (58 km) west of the city.

The next day, Joseph Kaspé received a ransom note demanding $100,000. He contacted the local French consul, which convinced him to delay paying the ransom and promised to cooperate with the Japanese authorities' search. A month later, he received half a bloody ear but was again advised against paying. Simon Kaspé's corpse was found by the police on December 3. The kidnappers had starved and beaten him, cut off his ears, ripped off his fingernails, and forced him to keep his head in a dark, cold hole in the ground as temperatures dropped to 20 and 30 degrees below zero. He was executed by a gunshot to the head.

== Aftermath ==
Thousands of protesters from many communities attended Kaspé's funeral. While it has been said that Harbin was a "paradise in the twenties," the Japanese occupation and the presence of 100,000-200,000 White Russian émigrés brought civilian crime lords. Protests by the Jewish communities of Harbin and Shanghai to Japanese vice-foreign minister Shigemitsu Mamoru had no effect.

The kidnappers were arrested but released the following day. After their convictions, the Chinese judge was brought up on charges of treason. The kidnappers were retried, found guilty, and sentenced to 15–20 years in prison. Several weeks later, Rodzaevsky successfully pled for their release by claiming the plot, which was devised by his top lieutenant Martinoff, was only motivated by a "patriotic" agenda.

By the mid-1930s, Harbin's Jewish population dropped by half because of economic depression and events relating to Kaspé's murder. These residents moved to Shanghai, other Chinese cities not under Japanese control, or even back to the Soviet Union, despite the fact that many had come to China fleeing persecution there.
