= Josef Albert Meisinger =

SS officer (1899–1947)

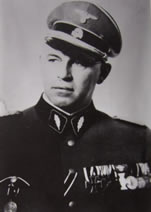
- Born: 14 September 1899; Munich, Kingdom of Bavaria, German Empire
- Died: 7 March 1947 (aged 47); Mokotów Prison, Warsaw, Polish People's Republic
- Cause of death: Execution by hanging
- Military career
- Allegiance: German Empire; Nazi Germany
- Branch: Imperial German Army; Munich Police; Gestapo
- Service years: 1916–1919; 1922–1933; 1933–1945
- Rank: Vizefeldwebel; SS-Standartenführer
- Nickname: "The Butcher of Warsaw"
- Commands: Einsatzgruppe IV; Kommandeur of SiPo and SD in Warsaw
- Conflicts: World War I World War II
- Awards: Iron Cross, 2nd class

Josef Albert Meisinger (14 September 1899 – 7 March 1947), also known as the "Butcher of Warsaw", was an SS functionary in Nazi Germany. He held a position in the Gestapo and was a member of the Nazi Party. During the early phases of World War II, Meisinger served as commander of Einsatzgruppe IV in Poland. From 1941 to 1945, he worked as liaison for the Gestapo at the German embassy in Tokyo. He was arrested in Japan in 1945, convicted of war crimes and was executed in Warsaw, Poland.

== Early life ==
Meisinger was born in Munich, the son of Josef and Berta Meisinger; he enlisted on 23 December 1916 and served during World War I in the 230th Minenwerfer Company (a type of short-range mortar), 22nd Bavarian Pioneer Battalion in the 30th Bavarian Reserve Division. After being wounded in battle he was awarded the Iron Cross and the Bavarian Military Merit Cross. On 18 January 1919 he attained the rank of Vizefeldwebel (senior sergeant), and on 19 April 1919 he entered the Freikorps under Franz Ritter von Epp, with whom he fought against the Soviet Republic of Bavaria. On 1 October 1922, he began working at the Munich Police Headquarters. As leader of the III Platoon of the II Company of the Freikorps Oberland, he took part in the Hitlerputsch on 8–9 November 1923.

He was inducted on 5 March 1933 into the Schutzstaffel (SS) and then into the Bavarian Political Police on 9 March 1933, thus coming into official contact with Heinrich Müller, Franz Josef Huber and Reinhard Heydrich (with whom he had served in the Freikorps). At that point in time, Heinrich Himmler was chief of the Munich Police and Heydrich was commander of Department IV, the political police. Meisinger became a member of the Nazi Party on 1 May 1933. He received the Blood Order Medal of the Nazi Party on 9 November 1933.

== Nazi career ==
On 20 April 1934, Meisinger was promoted to SS-Obertruppführer. Heydrich was appointed chief of the Gestapo on 22 April 1934. Immediately thereafter, Heydrich transferred to its Berlin office and took with him trusted colleagues: Heinrich Müller, Franz Josef Huber and Meisinger, referred to as the Bajuwaren-Brigade (Bavarian Brigade). On 9 May, Meisinger was promoted to SS-Untersturmführer (2nd lieutenant) in the Dezernat II 1 H and II H 1, which had the following tasks:

- Uncovering of opponents of Adolf Hitler within the Nazi Party
- Prosecution of homosexuals
- Prosecution of cases of abortion
- Prosecution of cases of intimate relations between Jews and non-Jews.

On 24 June 1934, he went to hear Erich Klausener at the Catholic Congress in Berlin and informed Heydrich that Klausener had made anarchist statements. On 30 June 1934, Klausener was shot by SS officer Kurt Gildisch in his office at the Prussian transportation ministry. After the war, Walter Schellenberg the former head of the foreign intelligence section of the SD in the RHSA, described Meisinger as:

One of the most evil creatures among Heydrich's bunch of thugs and he carried out the vilest of his orders...He was a frightening individual, a large, coarse-faced man with a bald head and an incredibly ugly face. However, like many men of his type, he had drive and energy and an unscrupulous sort of cleverness...As a result of his long police experience he knew a good deal about the workings and methods of the Comintern.

=== Role in the Blomberg–Fritsch Affair ===
From 1936 to 1938 Meisinger was a leader in the Gestapo in charge of the Reich Central Office for the Combating of Homosexuality and Abortion (Reichszentrale zur Bekämpfung der Homosexualität und Abtreibung) in the Gestapo Central Headquarters in the Sicherheitspolizei (SiPo). During this period he was promoted to SS-Obersturmbannführer (lieutenant colonel). In early 1938 Adolf Hitler, Hermann Göring and Himmler wanted to dispose of Field Marshal Werner von Blomberg, a conservative member of the army's high command and Hitler's Minister of Defense. Meisinger's investigation revealed that Blomberg's wife, Erna Gruhn, had been a prostitute with a police record and once posed for pornographic photos. Blomberg was forced to resign.

In 1936, Meisinger had uncovered allegations of homosexuality made against the commander-in-chief of the Army Colonel General Werner von Fritsch. A file was prepared and Heydrich passed the information on to Hitler. Hitler chose to dismiss the allegations and ordered Heydrich to destroy the file. However, he did not do so.

In late January 1938, Göring wanted to dispose of von Fritsch as he did not want Fritsch to become the successor to Blomberg and thus his superior. Heydrich resurrected the old file on Fritsch. Meisinger saw it as an opportunity for advancement, since he knew that Himmler and the SS regarded homosexuals as a danger to the regime. However, Meisinger's police work was judged to be sloppy and Heydrich and Müller were dissatisfied. At one point, Meisinger and Huber interrogated Otto Schmidt, a notorious criminal whose Berlin gang specialized in the blackmail of homosexuals. Schmidt identified von Fritsch as a man whom he had witnessed engaging in homosexual acts in 1933. When Meisinger provided a photograph of Fritsch on which was clearly printed Fritsch's name, title and military rank, Schmidt jumped at the chance to advance himself by slandering the general. Heydrich resubmitted the updated von Fritsch file to Hitler. Werner Best, in describing this incident, called Meisinger "a primitive man with clumsy methods". It was eventually determined that von Fritsch had been confused with Rittmeister Achim von Frisch. The accusations against Fritsch broke down in court and members of the German officer corps were appalled at Fritsch's treatment. Meisinger's career in the Gestapo was almost terminated.

=== Activities in Poland ===
As a consequence of Meisinger's and his agency's failure, he and others were replaced, transferred for disciplinary reasons or dismissed. In 1938 he was transferred to work in the archives of the principal SD office, but by September 1939 he was appointed Deputy Commander of the Einsatzgruppe IV in Poland. On 1 January 1940, after promotion to SS-Standartenführer (colonel), Meisinger was appointed "Kommandeur der Sicherheitspolizei und des SD" in the Warsaw District. He replaced Lothar Beutel who had been denounced for corruption.

Meisinger proceeded to apply brutal force against Poles, mostly those of Jewish descent. As part of the German AB-Aktion in Poland, he authorized the Palmiry massacre, the mass shooting of 1,700 people in the forest near Palmiry. As a reprisal for the murder of a Polish policeman, he ordered the execution of 55 Jewish residents on 22 November 1939, and on 20 December, the execution of 107 Poles as a reprisal for the murder of two Germans. Meisinger became so notorious that he was called the "Butcher of Warsaw" (although this sobriquet was also given to SS-Gruppenführer Heinz Reinefarth). According to Schellenberg, his atrocities in Warsaw even appalled his superiors: "I had collected a huge file which proved him to be so utterly bestial and corrupt as to be practically inhuman...At this stage...Heydrich intervened: Meisinger knew too much, and Heydrich managed to prevent the trial from taking place." Heydrich's appeal to Himmler saved Meisinger from court-martial and possible execution. He was sent to Tokyo as a means of keeping him at arm's length until the dust had settled.

During his trial in 1947 Meisinger stated that he was not in Warsaw after October 1940, but it is likely that he participated in the creation of the Warsaw Ghetto.

=== Activities in Shanghai and Japan ===
From 1 April 1941 to May 1945, Meisinger acted as Gestapo liaison connecting leaders and particular agents of the SD at the German Embassy in Tokyo. His duties included seeking out enemies of the Third Reich within the German community, using various informants. He was also the SD liaison officer to the Japanese Secret Intelligence Service. One of his tasks in Japan was the observation of the secret Soviet agent Richard Sorge (who was under suspicion in Berlin) but Meisinger soon became Sorge's constant drinking companion and, unwittingly, one of Sorge's best sources of information.

According to one Japanese informant, Shibata Mitsugi, whose testimony and reliability has been questioned, in 1941, Meisinger developed a plan and tried to influence the Japanese to exterminate approximately 18,000–20,000 Jews who had escaped from Austria and Germany and who were living in Japanese-occupied Shanghai. His proposals included the creation of a concentration camp on Chongming Island in the delta of the Yangtze, or starvation on freighters off the coast of China. The Japanese admiral responsible for overseeing Shanghai would not yield to pressure from Meisinger; however, the Japanese built a ghetto in the neighborhood of Hongkew which had already been planned by Tokyo in 1939: a slum with about twice the population density of Manhattan. The ghetto was strictly isolated by Japanese soldiers under the command of the Japanese official Kano Ghoya, and Jews could only leave it with special permission. Some 2,000 of them died in the Shanghai Ghetto during the wartime period.

== Arrest, trial, and execution ==
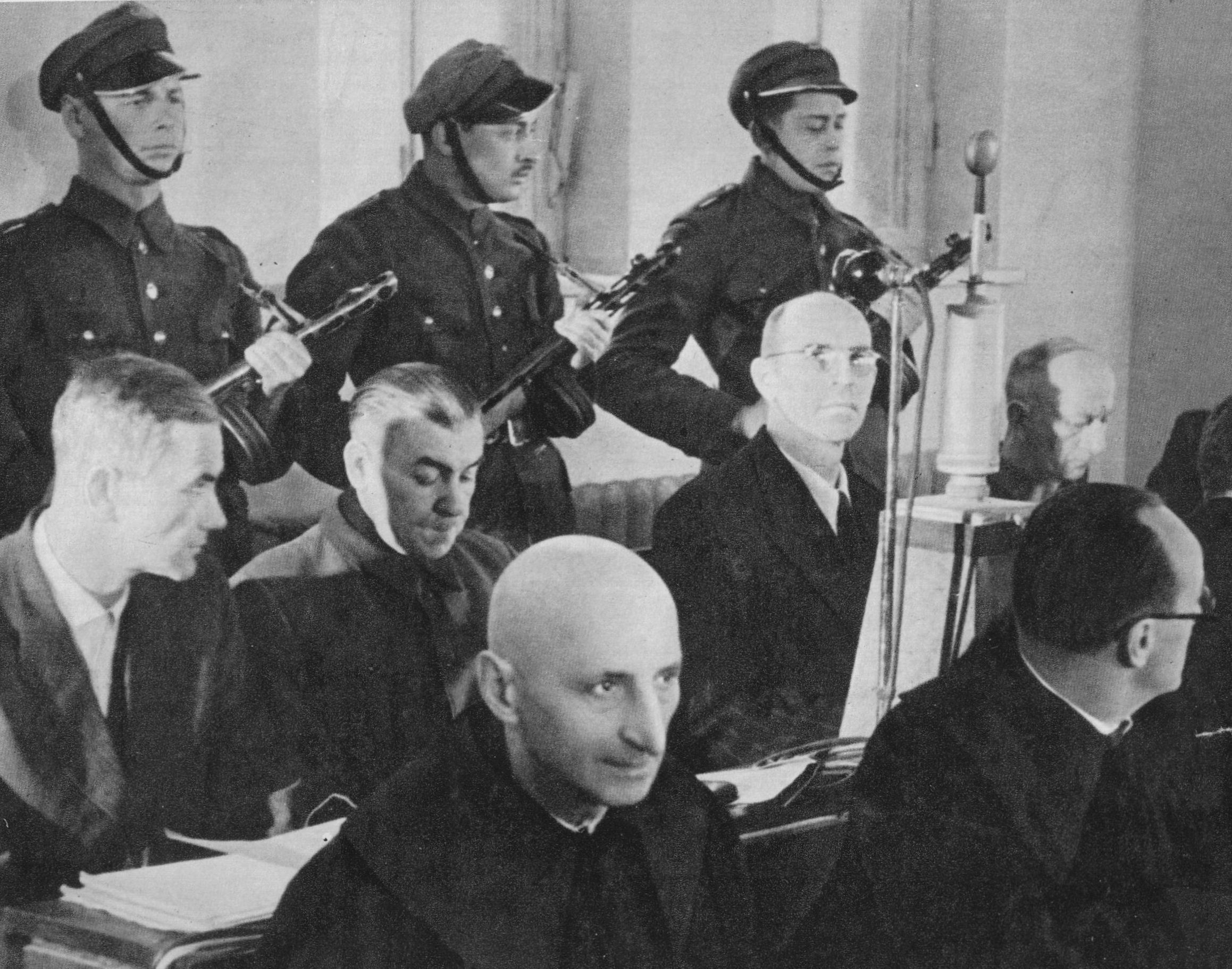
Josef Albert Meisinger (second row, second from the right) during his trial before the Supreme National Tribunal in Warsaw.

On 6 September 1945, Meisinger surrendered to two war correspondents, Clark Lee of the INS and Robert Brumby of MBS, at the Fujiya Hotel in Hakone, Kanagawa. The reporters drove him to the Yokohama headquarters of the Counterintelligence Corps where Meisinger turned himself in. He was held in the Yokohama Jail where he underwent intensive questioning for two weeks before being transferred to US General Dwight D. Eisenhower's headquarters in Frankfurt. In November 1945, under the escort of Lieutenant Colonel Jennis R. Galloway and Major James W. McColl, both of the 441st CIC detachment, he was flown to Washington, D.C. for questioning on his involvement in the destruction of the Warsaw Ghetto.

In 1946, he was extradited to Poland. In Warsaw, on 17 December 1946, he was charged, together with Ludwig Fischer (Nazi Governor of the Warsaw District), Max Daume (Acting Commander of the Ordnungspolizei in Warsaw), and Ludwig Leist (Nazi Plenipotentiary Governor of the City of Warsaw) of Nazi crimes. The trials took place between 17 December 1946 and 24 February 1947. On 3 March 1947, the Supreme National Tribunal in Warsaw sentenced Meisinger to death, and on 7 March he was executed in Warsaw's Mokotów Prison.
