= Tsuruga Municipal Museum =

Japanese history and folklore museum

Coordinates: 35°39′24″N 136°04′08″E

- 敦賀市立博物館
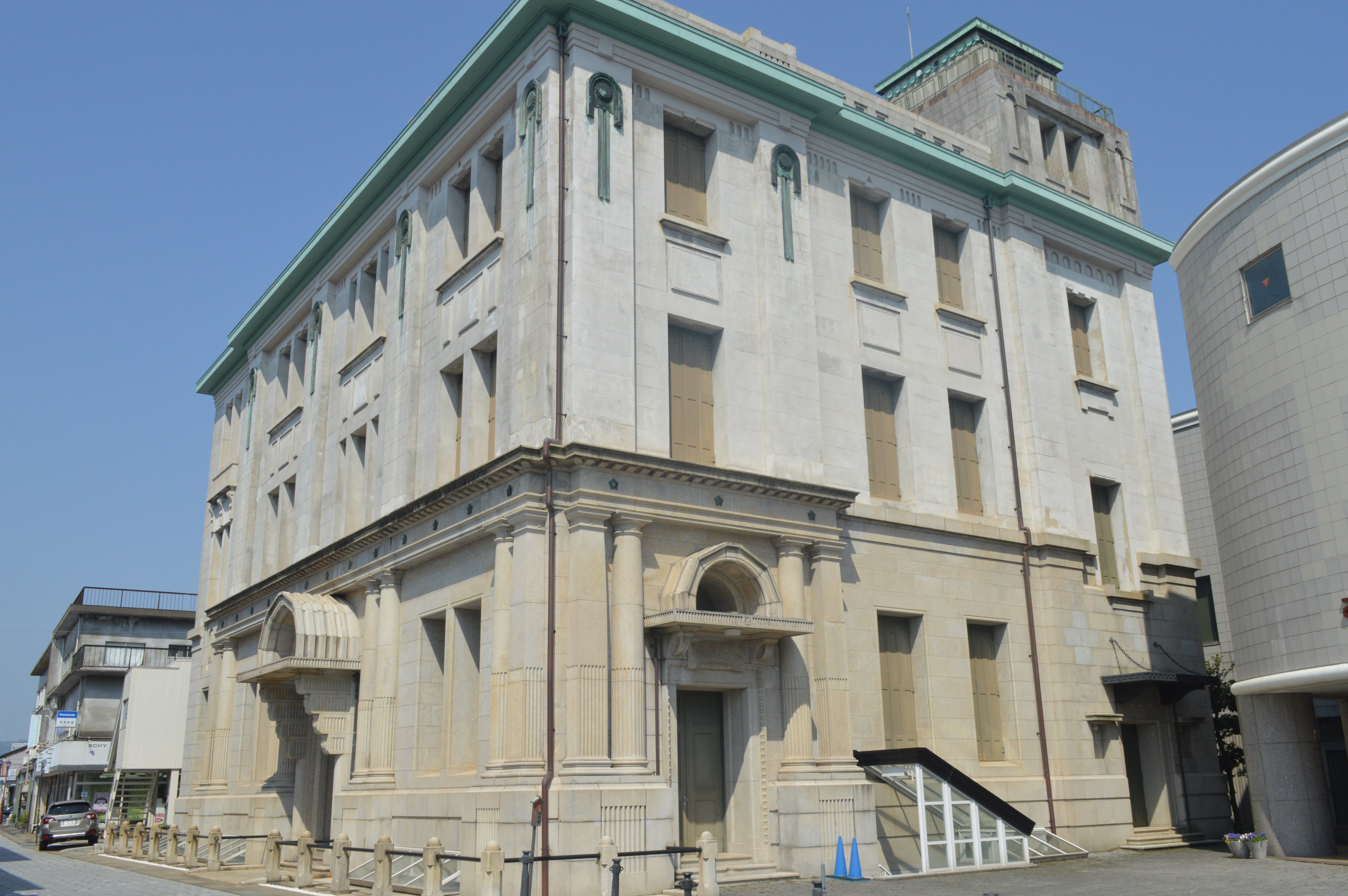
- Established: 1978（Shōwa 53）
- Location: 7–8 aioi-cho, Tsuruga, Fukui prefecture, Japan
- Type: Art museum, History museum
- Website: tsuruga-municipal-museum.jp/en/

The Tsuruga Municipal Museum is a history and folklore museum located in Tsuruga-city, Fukui Prefecture Japan. It uses the former main branch of the Owada Bank (a nationally designated Important Cultural Property), which was completed in 1927 (Shōwa era 2), as its museum facility.

== History ==
In August 1978 (Showa era 53), the Tsuruga City Historical and Folk Museum opened in the former Owada Bank headquarters building. In February 1993 (Heisei era 5), it was registered as a museum, and in July of the same year, it was renamed Tsuruga Municipal Museum.

== Collections and exhibits ==
The permanent exhibition features materials related to Tsuruga, including over 300 early modern and modern paintings, one of the prefecture's leading collections, as well as a wide range of other items such as haiku and haikai poetry, local history, historical materials, folklore materials, and port-related materials. Special and themed exhibitions are also held regularly. The early modern and modern paintings are not collections inherited from former daimyo families or wealthy individuals with ties to the area, but rather a collection that the museum itself has amassed over time. Due to Tsuruga's strong influence from Kyoto culture, the collection focuses on Kyoto-related painting schools such as the Maruyama-Shijo school, the Kishi school, the Hara school, the Tosa school, and the Revival Yamato-e. In particular, there are many works by Tsuruga natives such as Utsumi Yoshido and the three generations of the Utsumi family, Kono Bairei, whose father was the head of the horse-drawn carriage business in Tsuruga, and Hashimoto Chobei and Somiya Ichinen, who had ties to Tsuruga.

== Architecture ==
=== Architectural timeline ===
- 1927 (Showa 2): The second main branch building of Owada Bank was completed.
- 1945 (Showa 20): Owada Bank was absorbed and merged into Sanwa Bank.
- 1962 (Showa 37): Sanwa Bank withdrew and became Fukui Bank.
- 1977 (Showa 52): The building was donated to Tsuruga City.
- 1978 (Showa 53): Became the Tsuruga City Historical and Folk Museum.
- 1993 (Heisei 5): Designated a cultural property of Tsuruga City. Renamed Tsuruga City Museum.
- 2010 (Heisei 22): Designated a cultural property of Fukui Prefecture.
- 2012 (Heisei 24): Closed for restoration work. The storage building was completed.
- 2015 (Heisei 27): Restoration work was completed and the museum reopened.
- 2017 (Heisei 29): Designated as an Important Cultural Property (building).

=== Architectural history ===
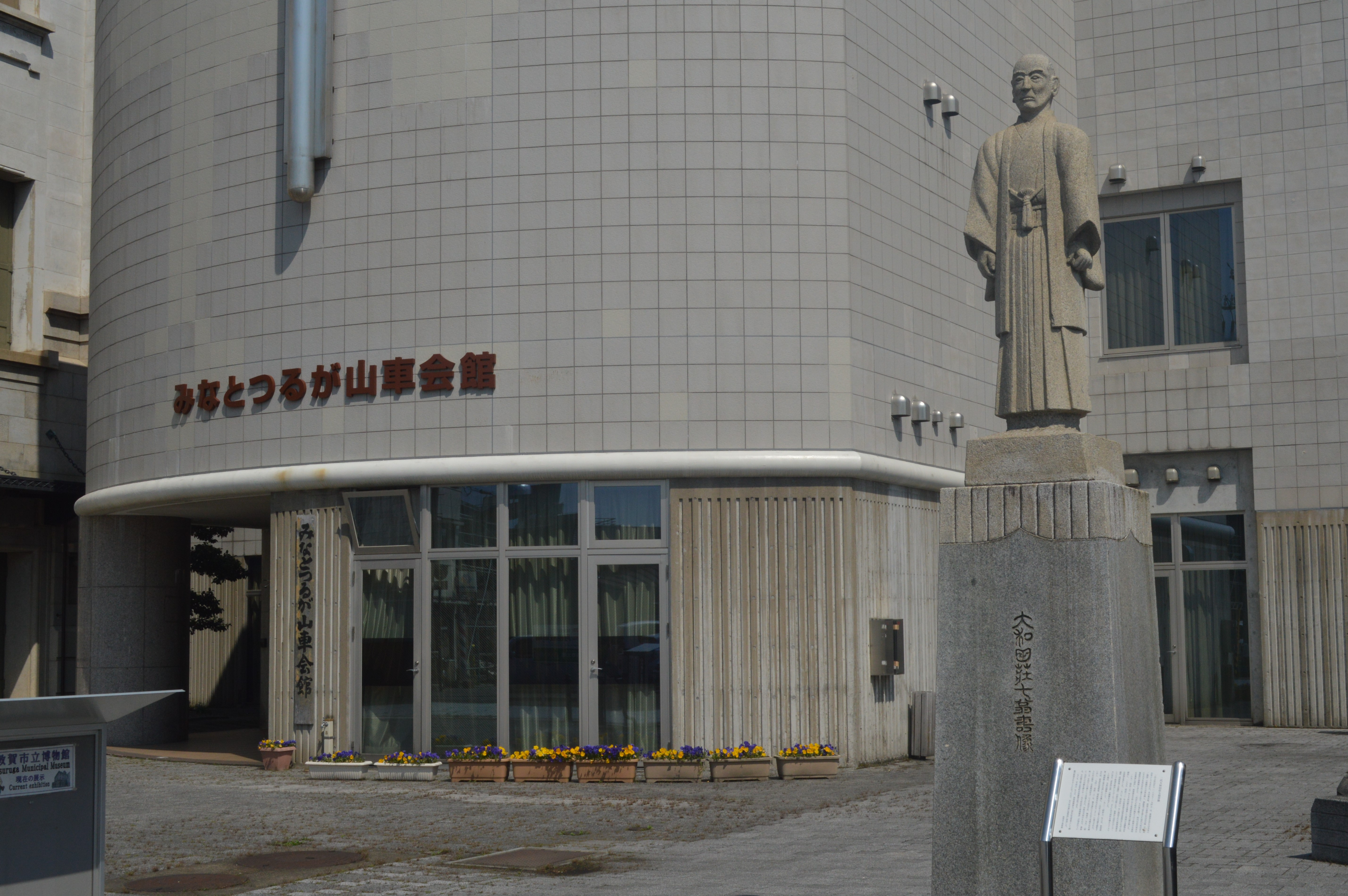
A bronze statue of Shoshichi Owada located on the grounds of the Tsuruga City Museum

Construction of the Owada Bank Head Office began in 1925 and was completed in 1927. 350,000 yen was invested in its construction.The reinforced concrete (partially stone) building had three above-ground floors and one basement floor, and was equipped with an elevator, which was rare in the Hokuriku region at the time. In addition to its banking operations, the building also housed public spaces. The basement was open as a restaurant, and the rooftop as a beer garden.The third floor also had a meeting hall with a stage, which was used as a public hall.This is seen as a reflection of the founder Shoichi Owada's vision of promoting cultural enrichment and development alongside the economic development of the region.

During the final stages of World War II, Tsuruga was subjected to several air raids, including the Great Tsuruga Air Raid on 12 July 1945, but this building escaped major damage.This museum also houses various documents from that period.

=== Restoration work ===
Prior to the restoration work from 2012 to 2015, the museum lacked sufficient storage space for its collections. Temporary walls were erected inside to create a backroom, and the building was covered in display cases, making it difficult to fully appreciate its original structure and decorationsIn 2012, prior to the restoration work, a new storage building was constructed on the north side of the museum. By limiting the number of exhibits, visitors can now view both the exhibits and the building's interior. Major areas restored include the bank counter on the first floor, the VIP room on the second floor, and the public hall with a stage on the third floor. On the other hand, the number of large display cases has been reduced, making it more difficult to display the painting collection.

The following are photographs of the museum after the restoration, before the exhibits were installed.

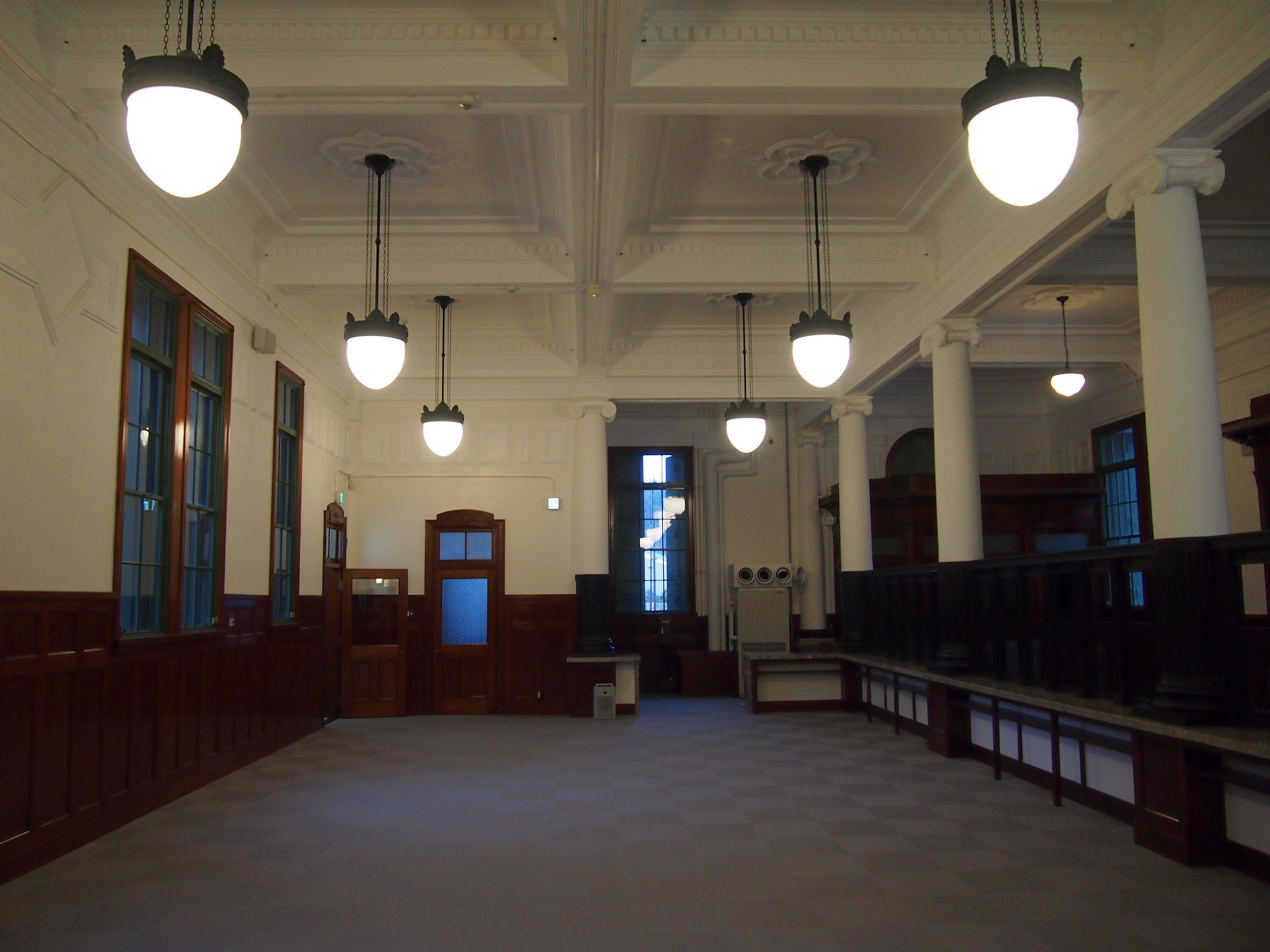
1st floor

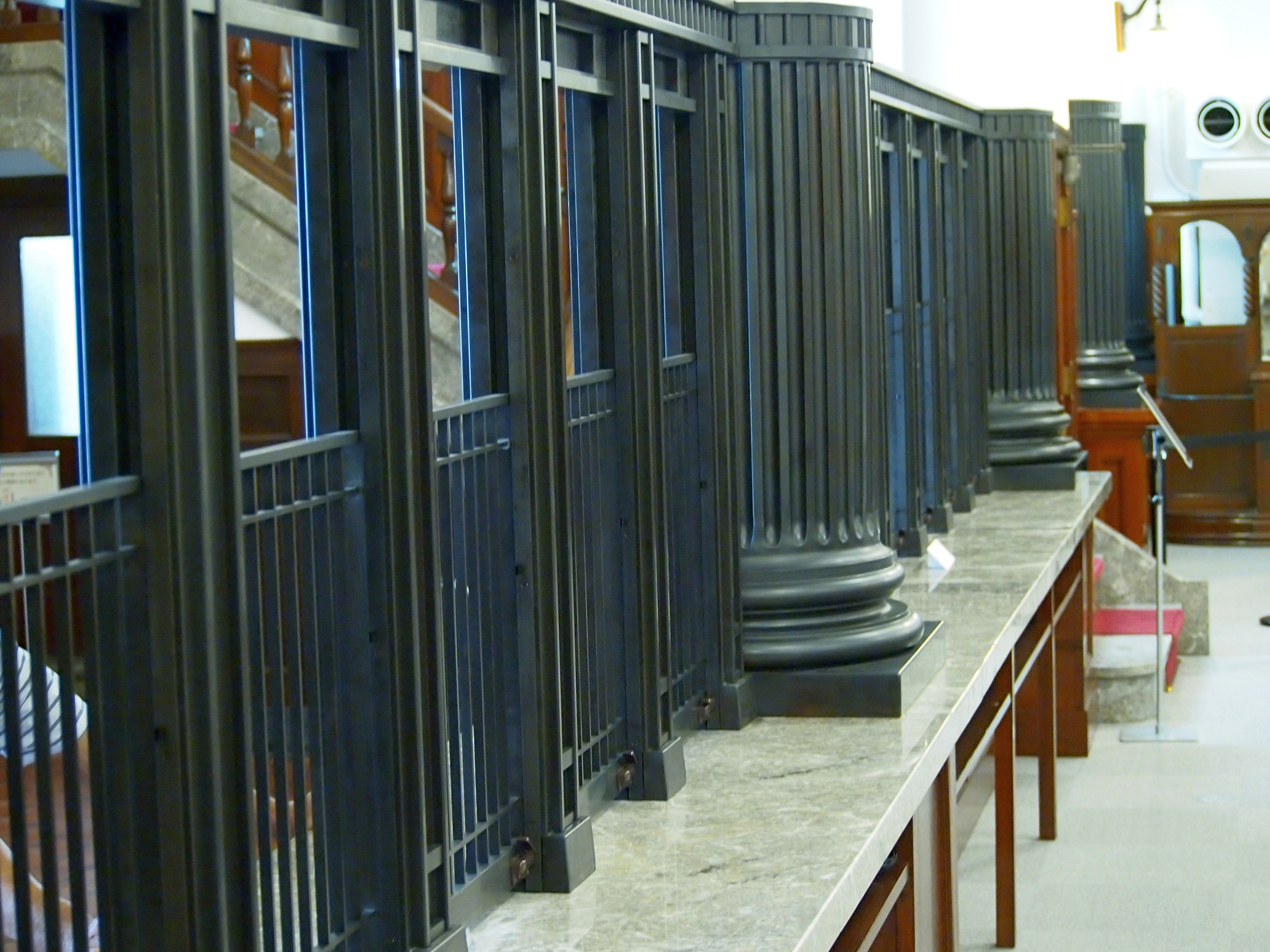
Bank counter on the 1st floor

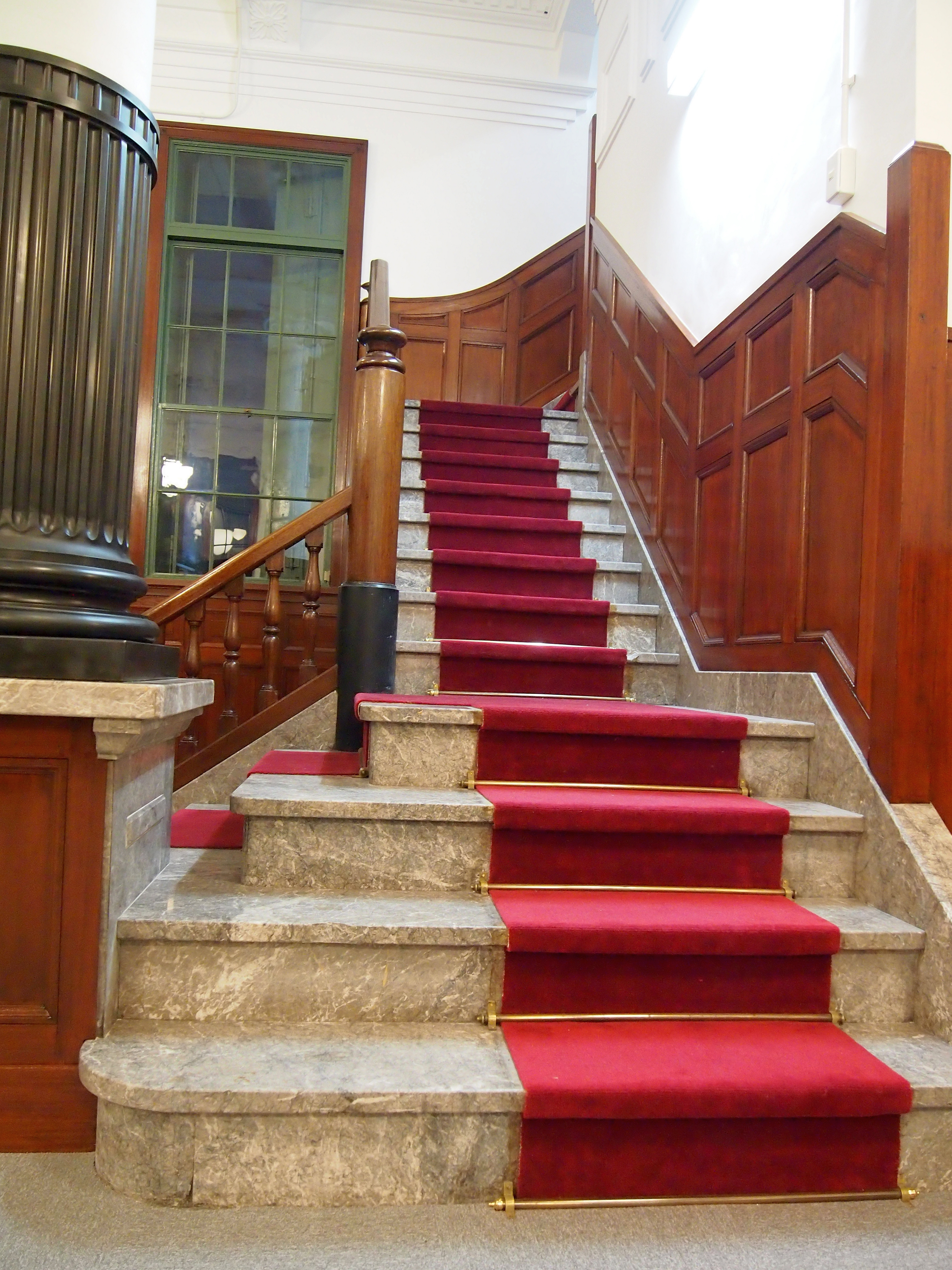
Staircase on the 1st floor

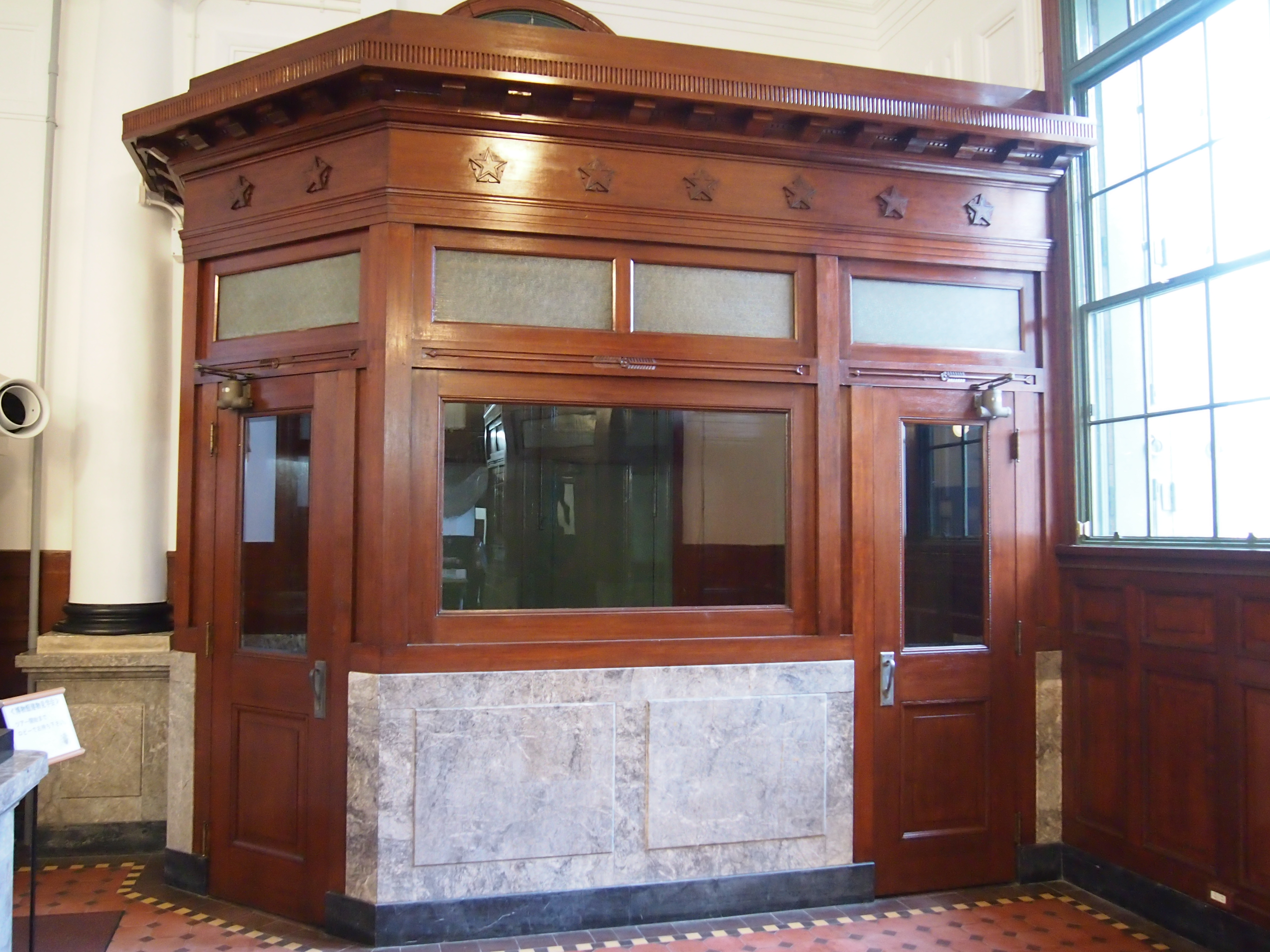
1st floor southeast entrance

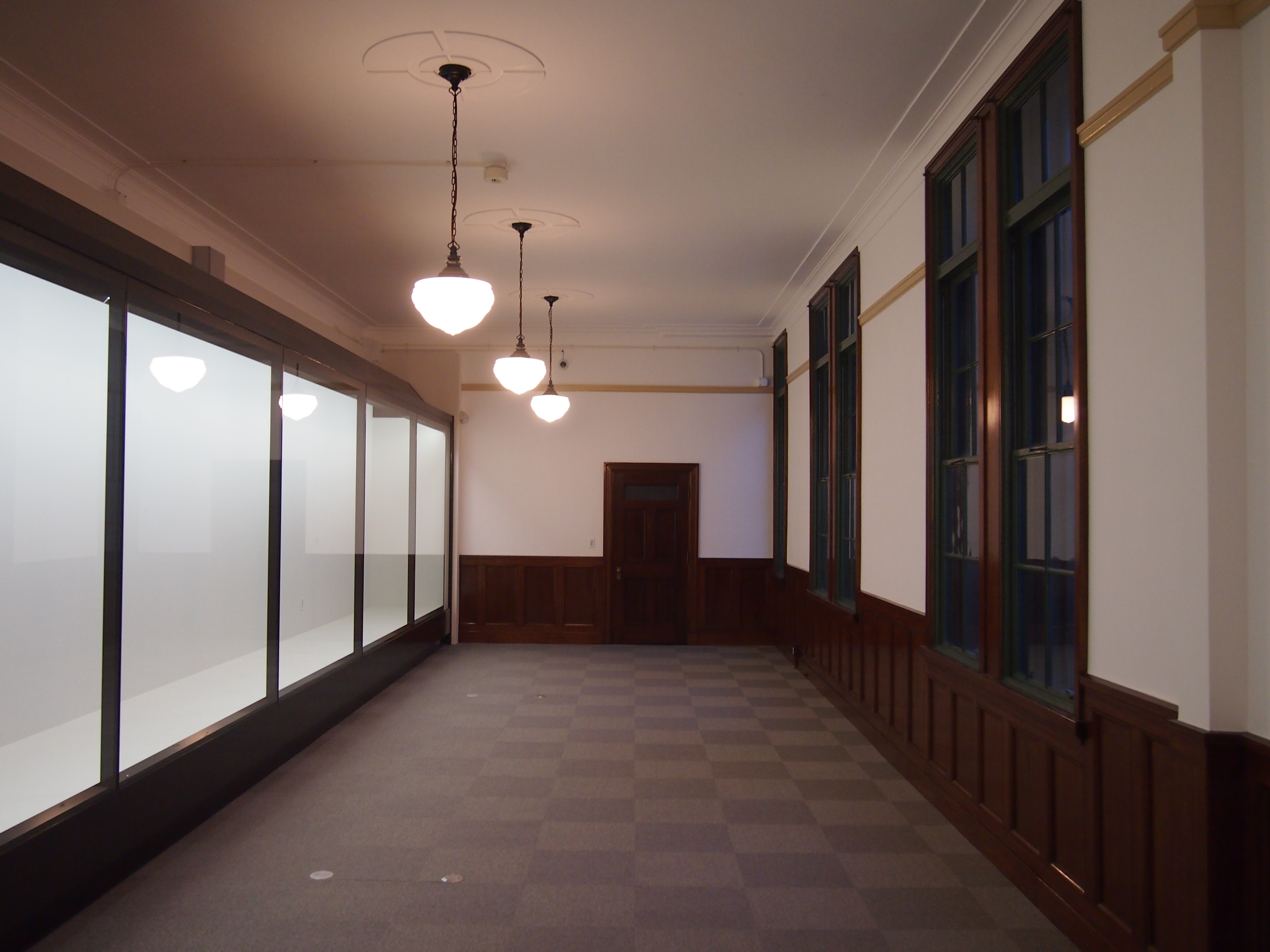
Second floor

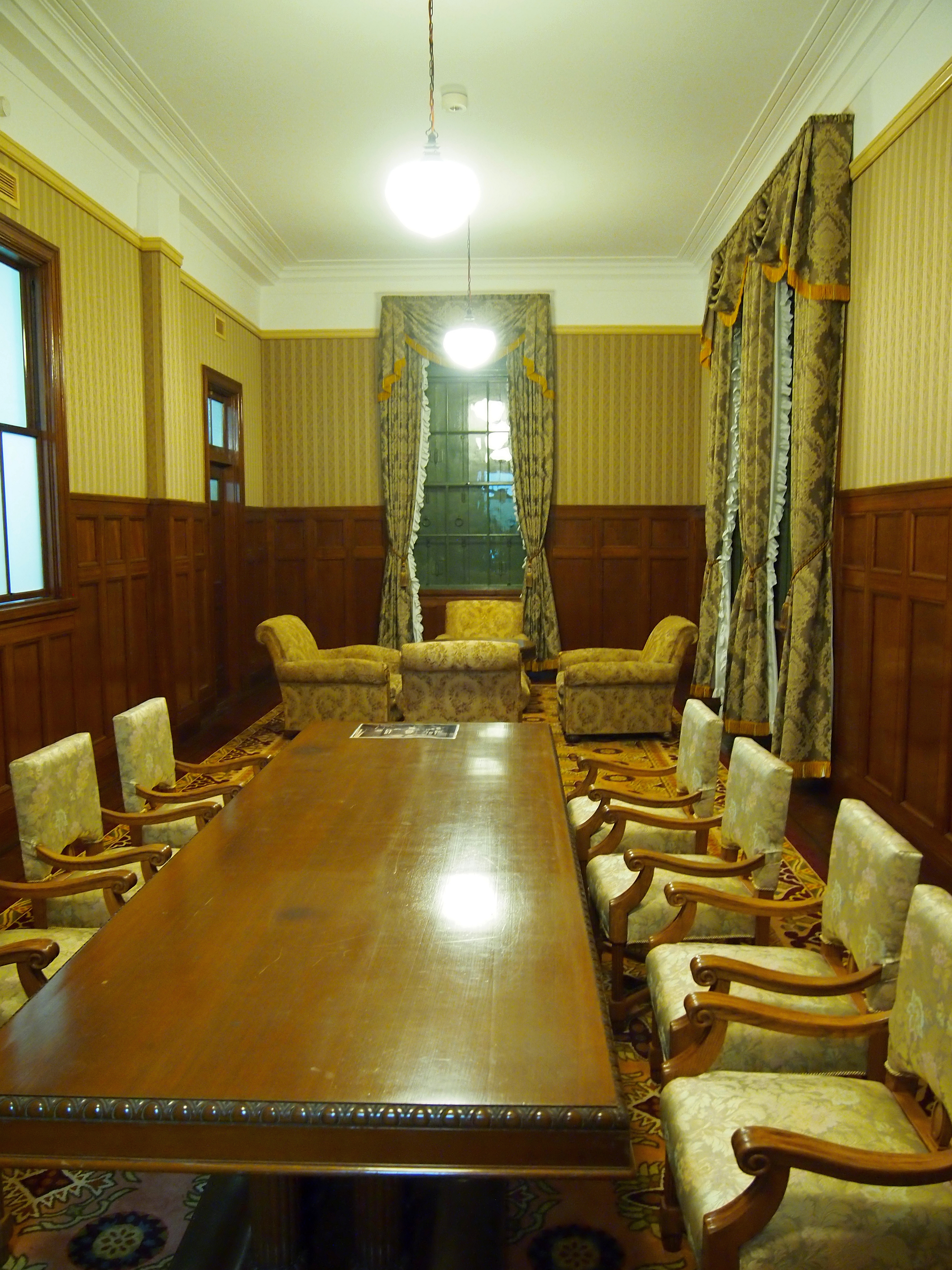
VIP room on the second floor

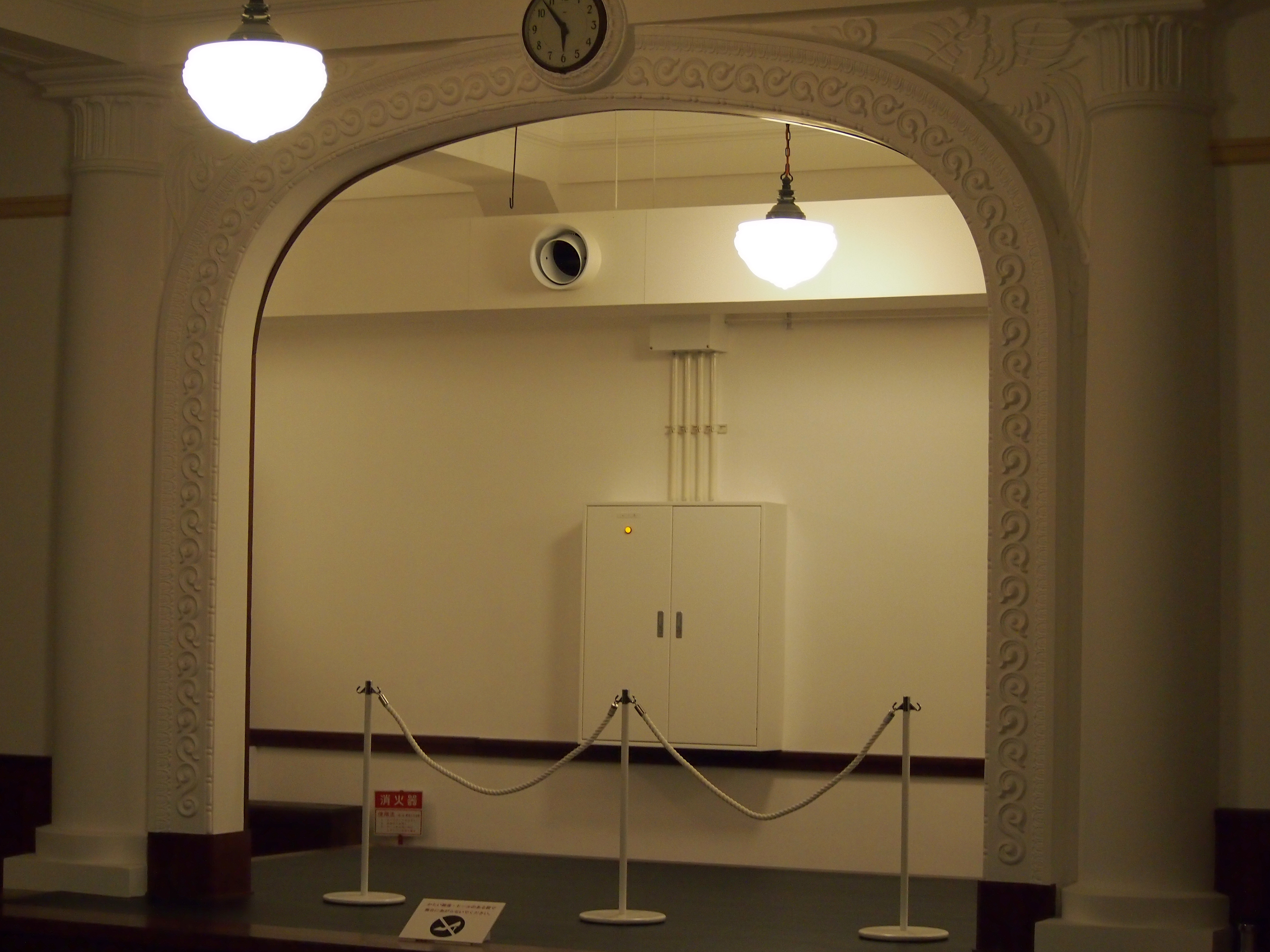
3rd floor public hall stage area

== Access ==
- Approximately 25 minutes on foot from Tsuruga Station on the Hokuriku Main Line, Hokuriku Shinkansen, Obama Line, and Happy Line Fukui Line.
- From Tsuruga Station, take the Tsuruga City Community Bus Matsubara Line and get off at the "Dashi Kaikan" bus stop, or take the Gurutto Tsuruga Loop Bus (sightseeing route) and get off at the "Hakubutsukan-dori" bus stop. Both are a 1-minute walk from the bus stop.

== Local area ==
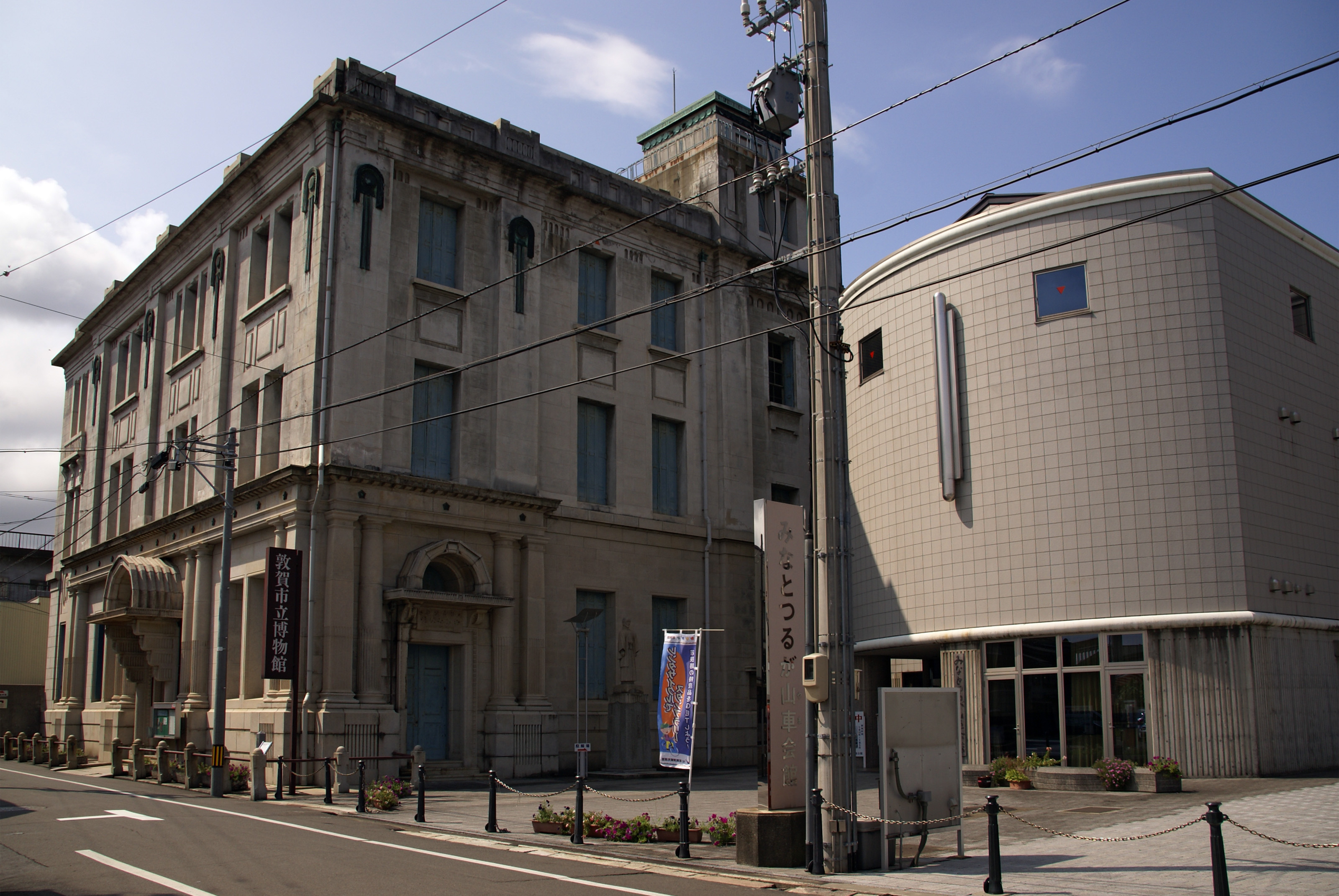
Museum (left) and Minato Tsuruga Float Museum (right)

The area around the museum has been named Museum Street and is being developed as a tourist district. In 2006, the Mainichi Shimbun selected "100 Heritage Sites" (a list of modern heritage sites that emphasize the value of tourism) and included "Tsuruga Port area retro architecture (Tsuruga City Museum, Red Brick Warehouse, etc.)."

- Tsuruga Port
- Tsuruga Red Brick Warehouse
- Kehi Shrine
- Port of Humanity Tsuruga Museum

== Bibliography ==
Catalogue edited and published by Tsuruga Municipal Museum

- Tsuruga Municipal Museum, ed. (4 January 1995). 館蔵逸品図録 [Catalogue of Masterpieces from the Collection] (in Japanese). Tsuruga Municipal Museum. OCLC 674784520.
- Tsuruga Municipal Museum, ed. (February 2001). 特別展 館蔵逸品図録（続2） [Special Exhibition: Catalogue of Masterpieces from the Collection (Continued II)] (in Japanese). Tsuruga Municipal Museum. OCLC 676059160.
- Tsuruga Municipal Museum, ed. (25 October 2003). 平成十五年度 館蔵逸品図録（続3） [2003 Catalogue of Masterpieces from the Collection (Continued III)] (in Japanese). Tsuruga Municipal Museum. OCLC 674988396.
- Tsuruga Municipal Museum, ed. (31 March 2009). 平成二十年度 館蔵逸品図録（続4） [2008 Catalogue of Masterpieces from the Collection (Continued IV)] (in Japanese). Tsuruga Municipal Museum. OCLC 676358470.
- Tsuruga Municipal Museum, ed. (4 July 2015). 旧大和田銀行本店建物（敦賀市立博物館）修復事業完了記念誌 [Commemorative Publication on the Completion of the Restoration of the Former Owada Bank Head Office (Tsuruga Municipal Museum)] (in Japanese). Tsuruga Municipal Museum. OCLC 951235218.
