= Tsuruga Red Brick Warehouse =

- 敦賀赤レンガ倉庫
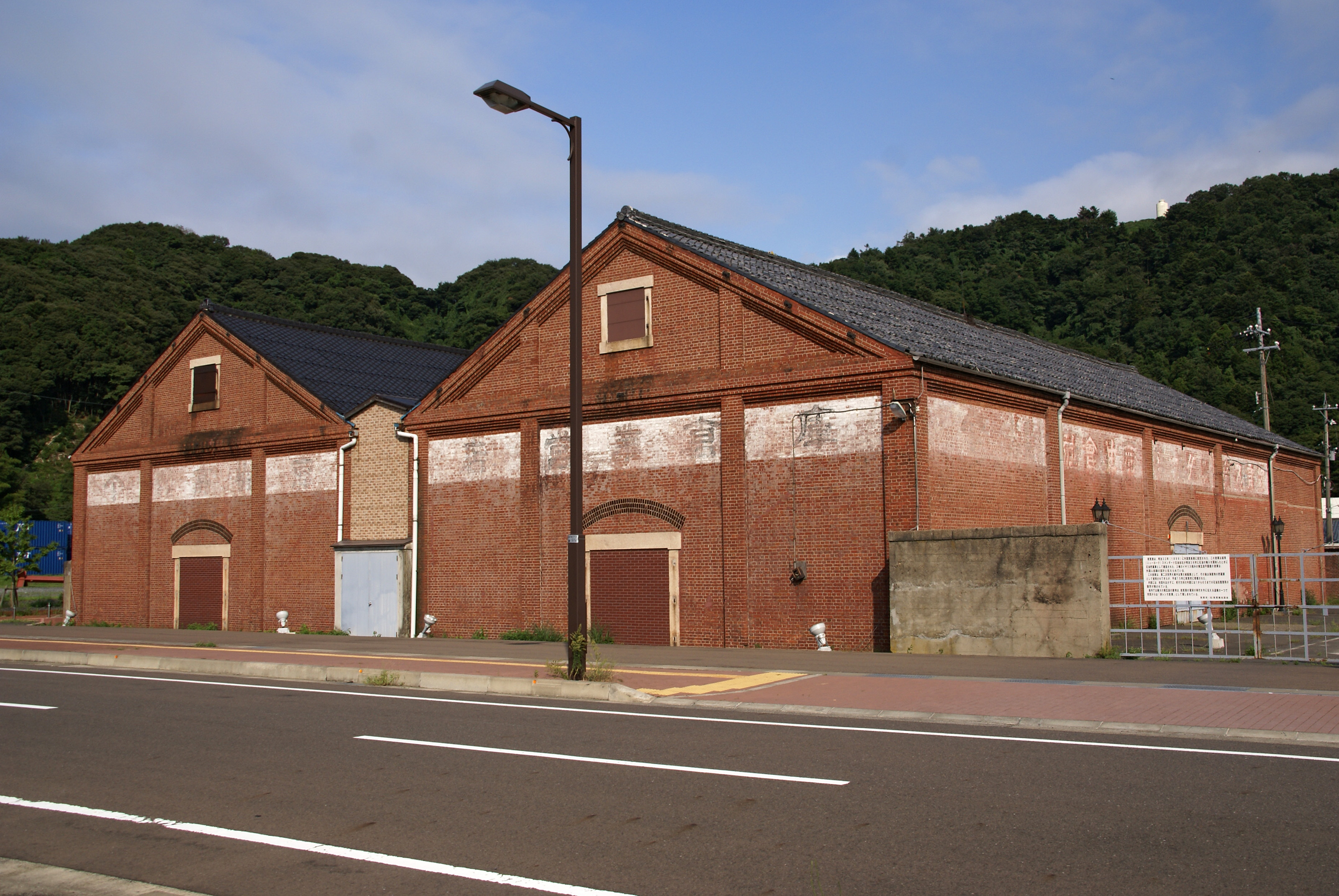
- Tsuruga Red Brick Warehouse

- Location within Fukui Prefecture Location within Japan

General information
- Type: Warehouse
- Location: 1-19 Kanagasaki-sho, Tsuruga-shi, Fukui-ken 914-0072, Japan, Japan
- Coordinates: 35°39′42.91″N 136°4′28.5″E
- Completed: 1905
- Renovated: 2015
- Owner: City of Tsuruga

Technical details
- Material: red brick

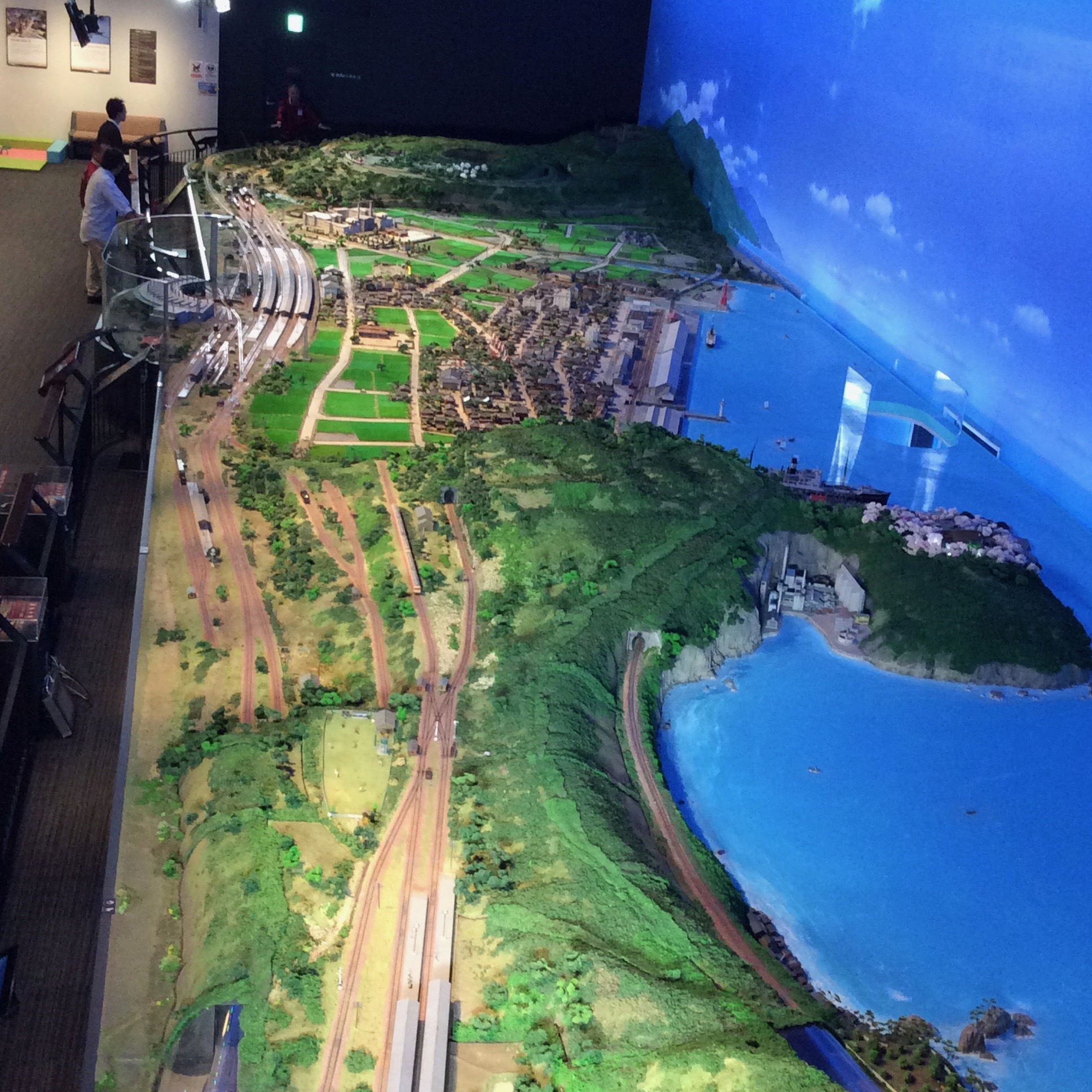
Interior view of Diorama Wing. Overview

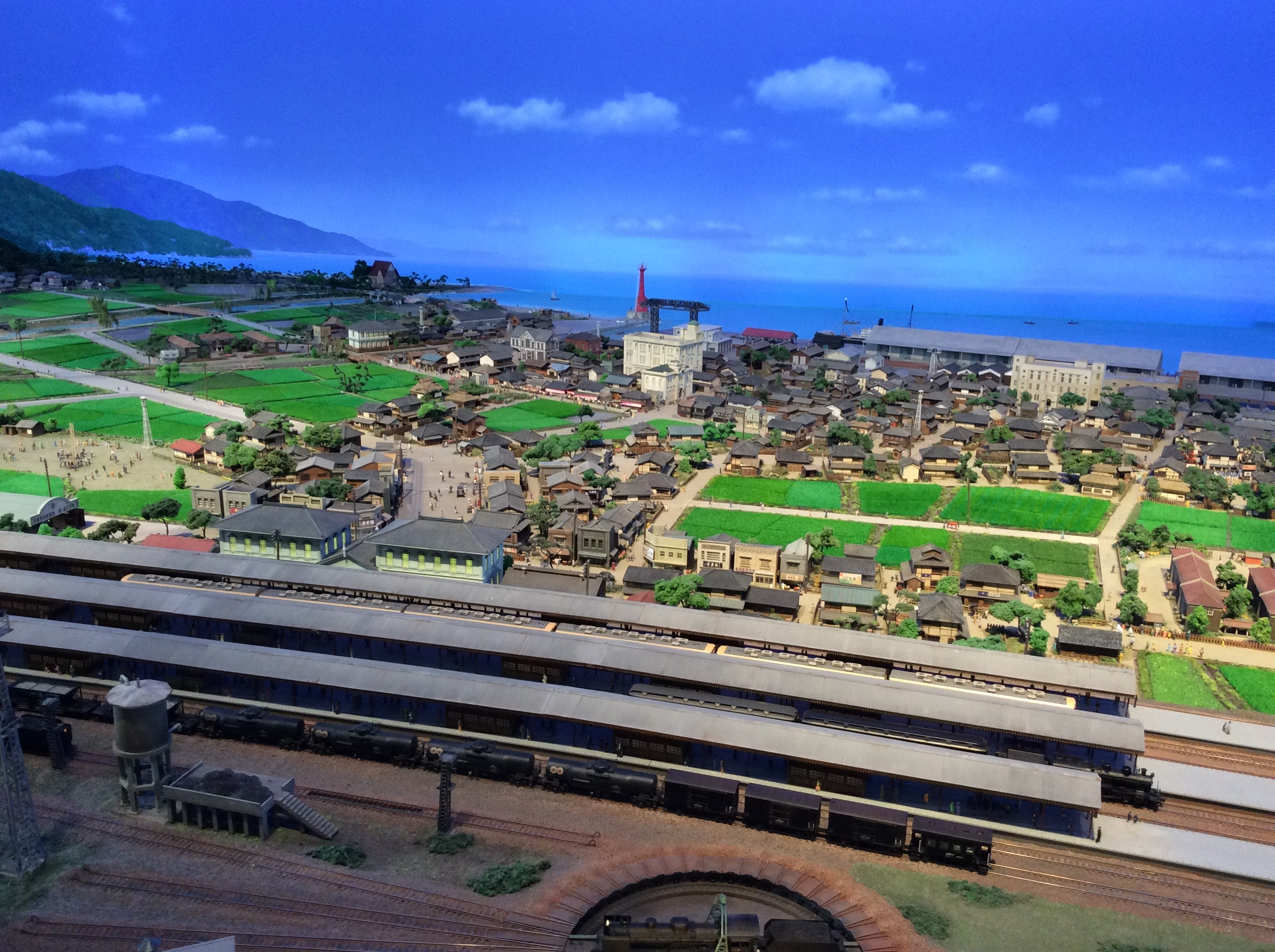
Interior view of Diorama Wing. Close-up of Tsuruga Station

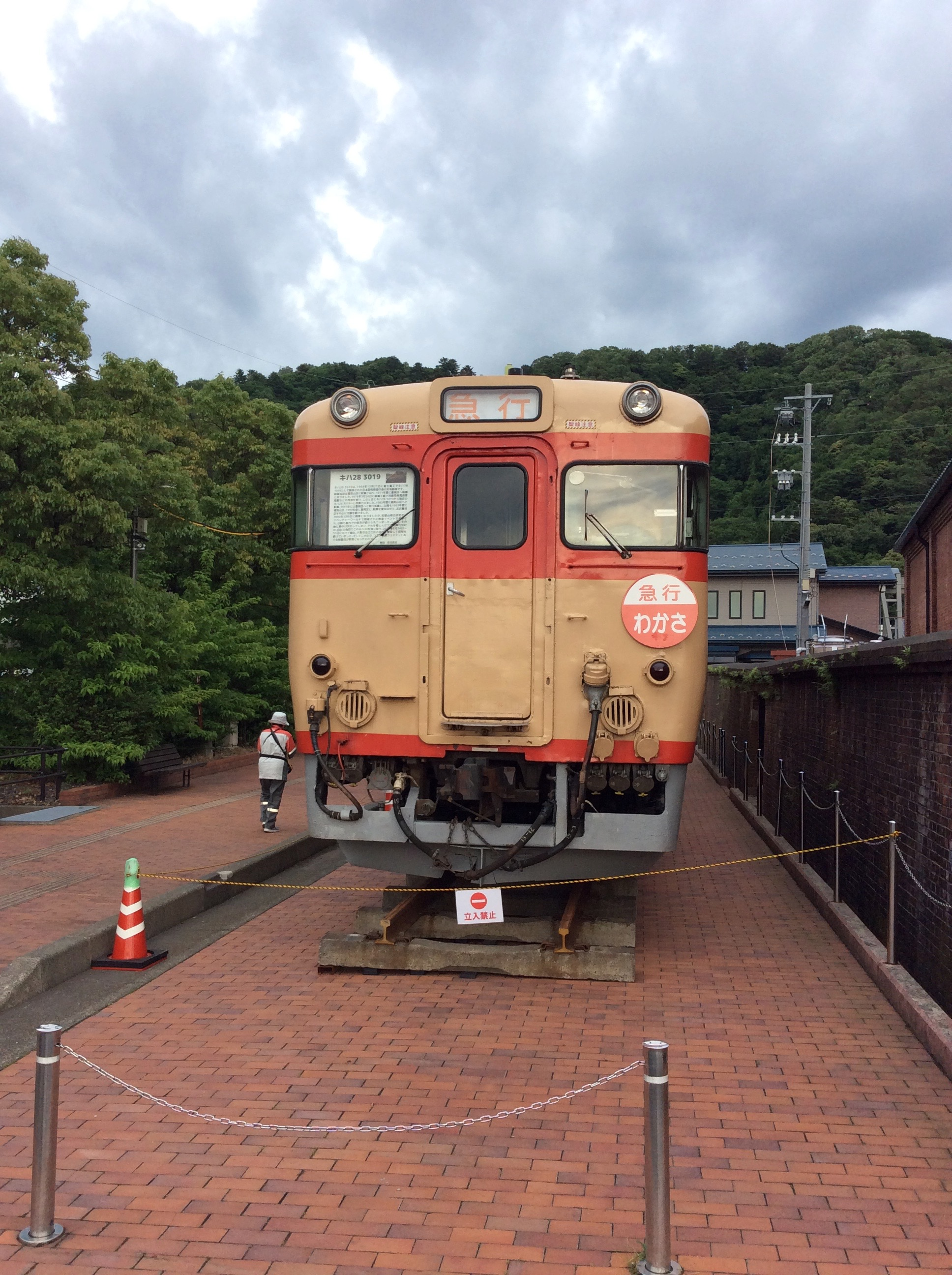
JNR/JR Kiha 28 series. Exhibited on adjacent yard.

Tsuruga Red Brick Warehouse (敦賀赤レンガ倉庫, Tsuruga Aka-Renga Sōko) is a pair of warehouse buildings located within the Port of Tsuruga in the city of Tsuruga, Fukui Prefecture, Japan. The buildings are preserved as a historical monument, and have been renovated for use as a restaurant hall (south-wing) and a diorama exhibition depicting Tsuruga during the Shōwa era with a model railroad (north wing).

== Overview ==
In 1905, the warehouses were built by Standard Oil of New York for the storage of petroleum. Between mid Meiji era to the early Shōwa era, Tsuruga flourished as a major seaport. These warehouses are remaining examples of red brick warehouses which were common in ports around Japan. The warehouses were designed by a foreign architect and feet was used as the unit of measurement. Other notable features are the use of imported Dutch bricks and a hidden columnar structure. In January 2009, the north and south wings of the building as well as their surroundings were designated as a registered tangible cultural property of Japan.

== Building ==
- Builder: Standard Oil, New York.
- Current ownership: City of Tsuruga
- Year of establishment: 1905
- Structure: Wooden beams, brick
- Location: 1-19 Kanagasaki-sho, Tsuruga-shi, Fukui-ken 914–0072, Japan

== Current status ==
In October 2015, 110 years after construction, the warehouse was renovated and opened as a tourist attraction. Today the south wing is a restaurant hall, the north wing is a diorama hall, and the south side is an open garden. In the diorama hall, the heyday of Tsuruga from the late Meiji period to the early Showa period is reproduced by using a HO scale model railroad.

In order to further attract tourists, the city of Tsuruga decided to highlight its railway heritage. As a part of effort in May 2018, a Kiha 28 Series diesel train was installed on adjacent land on the north side of the warehouse.

In addition to these, Kanegasaki area is indeed rich in railway heritage, including the Tsuruga train museum housed in the former station building of Tsuruga port station (reconstructed), a lamp house, and the Tsurugako line (operation suspended). The city plans to utilize these resources to further expand visitor attractions in this area.

== Access ==
- About 30 min walk from JR Hokuriku Main Line Tsuruga Station or an 8 min bus ride from the station (Gurutto Tsuruga Shuyu Bus, operated by Tsuruga Sightseeing Bus Co.) followed by a 4 min walk from Kanegasaki Park bus stop.

== Visitor information ==
Restaurant wing is free of charge. Open at 9:30, closes at 22:00. Admission fee incurs in diorama wing. Open at 9:30, closes at 17:30 (last admission at 17:00). Closed on Wednesday. If it is holiday, next day will closed instead. Also closes 30 Dec. – 1 Jan.

== Other attractions ==
- Tsuruga Port – Kanagasaki Park – Kirameki-minato kan – Former Tsuruga port station building (Tsuruga Railway Museum) – Takatoro Tall Stone Lantern at Suzaki – Lamp house – Tsuruga warehouses – Port of Humanity Tsuruga Museum
- Tsuruga Municipal Museum
- Minato Tsuruga Yama Kaikan
- Kami-Warabe Washi-Paper Doll Museum
- Kehi no Matsubara (pine tree park)
- Kehi Shrine
