= Port of Humanity Tsuruga Museum =

- 人道の港 敦賀ムゼウム

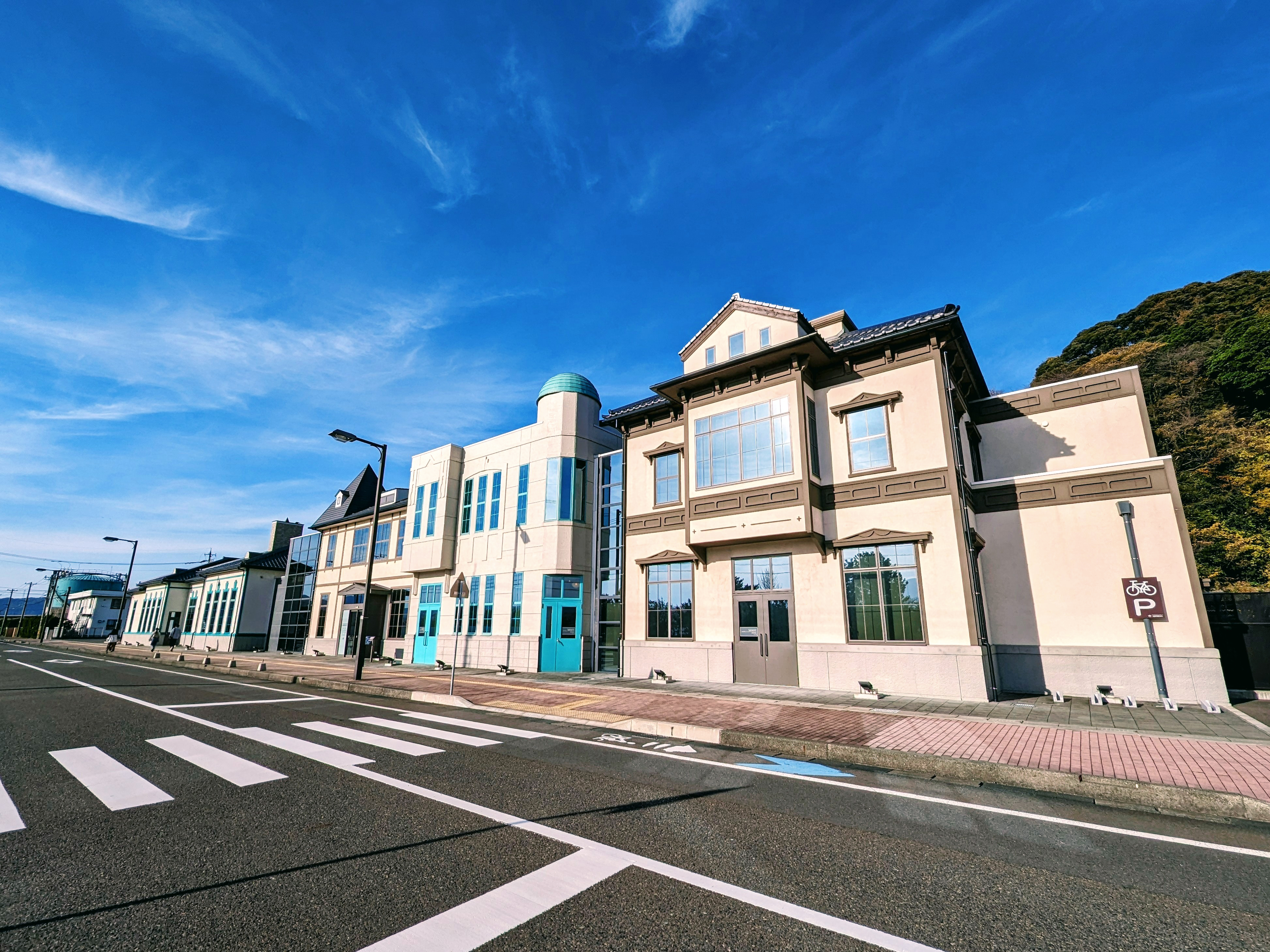

- Location of Port of Humanity Tsuruga Museum Port of Humanity Tsuruga Museum (Japan)
- Established: March 29, 2008
- Location: 1-44-1 Kanegasaki-cho, Tsuruga, Fukui Prefecture
- Coordinates: 35.662778°N 136.073444°E
- Type: history museum
- Website: https://tsuruga-museum.jp/

Port of Humanity Tsuruga Museum (人道の港 敦賀ムゼウム, Jindō no Minato Tsuruga Muzeumu) is a museum that displays the history of Tsuruga Port, located in Kanegasaki Park, Tsuruga, Fukui, Japan. It emphasizes Chiune Sugihara, who saved the lives of many Jewish refugees during World War II by issuing transit visas. He did this although he was forbidden by his country and issued over 2000 Visas in one month, eventually saving over 6,000 lives in the process. Tsuruga Port was the place they disembarked after their long journey from their native Europe.

== Exhibition ==
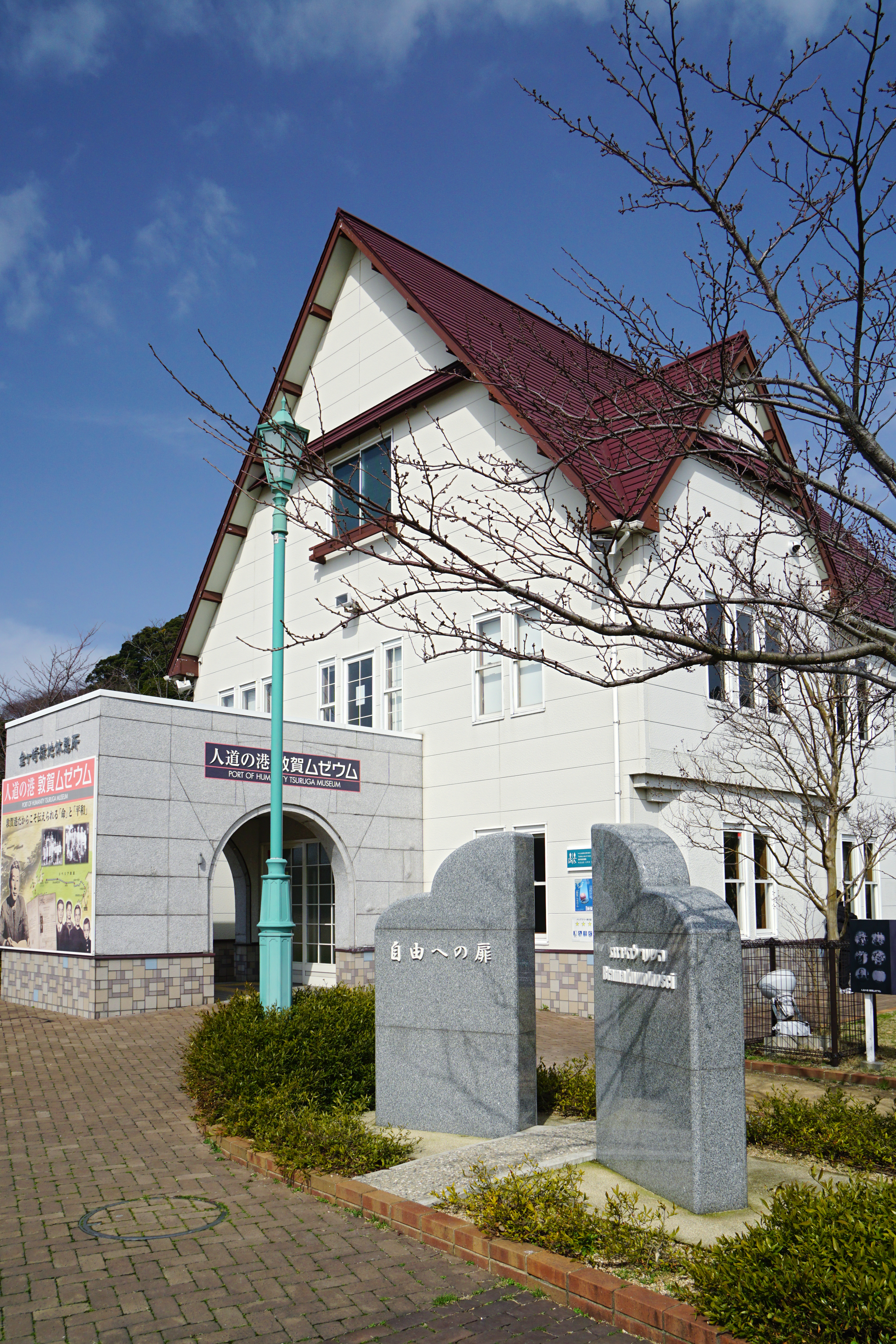
A closer view of the museum.

The main exhibit covers the history of Tsuruga Port. Since early times, Tsuruga Port has connected Japan to the Asian continent. Especially starting from the Meiji period to the early Showa period, it enjoyed its heyday by serving as a departing point connecting Japan to the terminus of the Trans-Siberian Railroad at Vladivostok.

The exhibit highlight the activities of Chiune Sugihara (also pronounced as Senpo Sugihara). While he served as an acting consul of Japanese Consulate in Kaunas, Lithuania, he saved the lives of many Jews persecuted by Nazis by issuing transit visa, ignoring the directives of the Japanese Ministry of Foreign Affairs. The Tsuruga Port was the first point of disembarkation on Japanese territory after a long and harsh journey from Europe via Trans-Siberian Railroad. The museum explains how the local citizens warmly supported the Jewish refugees during their short stay in Tsuruga before they departed for further journeys to their final destinations by exhibitions and interviews with those who survived, as well as their descendants.

"ムゼウム" is a Japanese transliteration of the word "museum" in Polish, based on the fact that many of the Jewish refugees originated from Poland.

== Access ==
The museum is about 30 minute walk from Tsuruga Station of JR Hokuriku Main Line, or an eight minute bus ride (Tsuruga Shuyu bus) from Tsuruga Station to Kanegasaki Park, followed by about a four minute walk.

== See also ==
- Chiune Sugihara
- The Chiune Sugihara Memorial Hall, located in Yaotsu, Kamo, Gifu prefecture.
- Tsuruga Port
