= Chiune Sugihara Memorial Hall =

Chiune Sugihara Memorial Museum
- 杉原千畝記念館
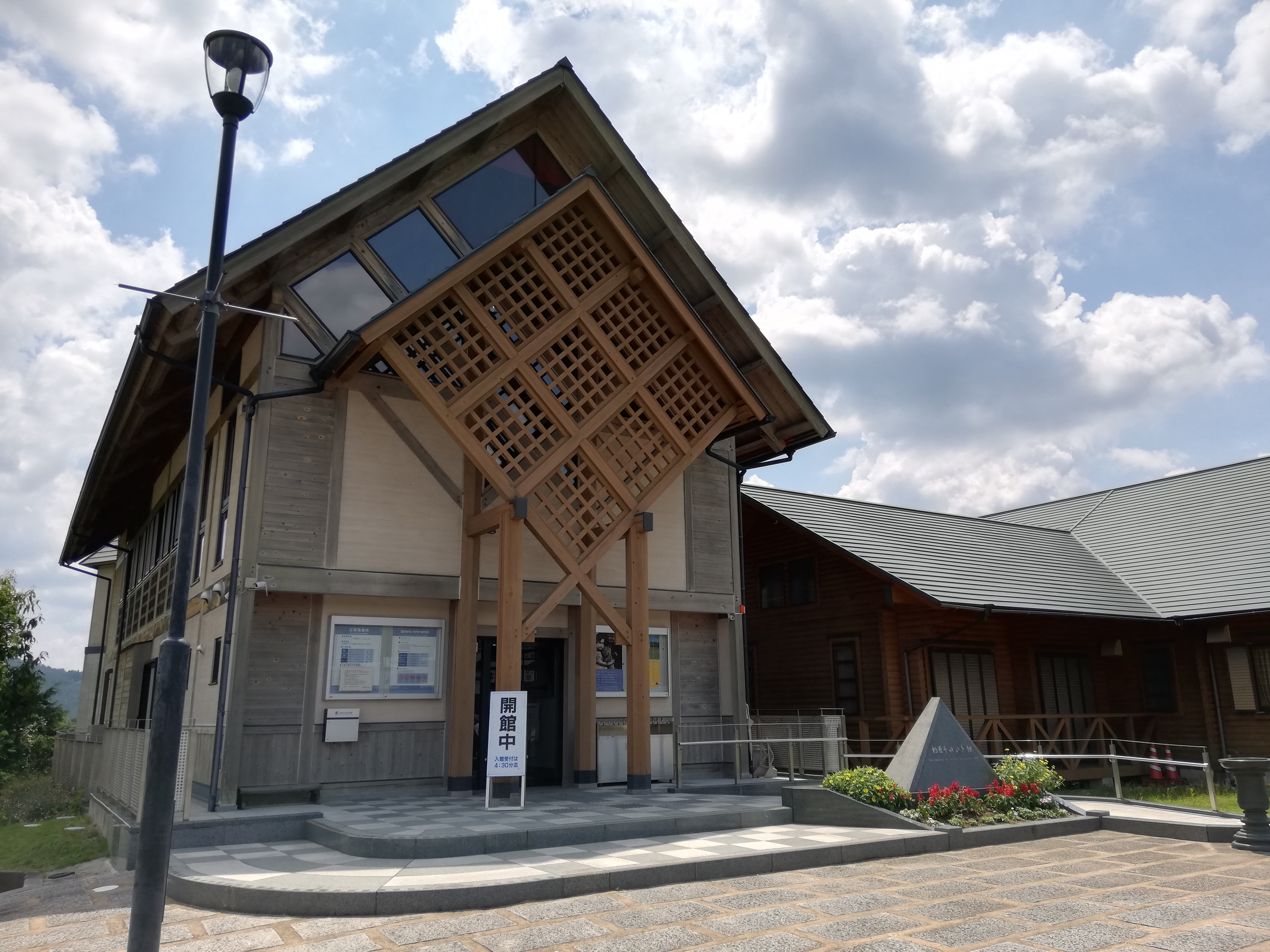
- The museum exterior in August 2021

- Location of the museum Chiune Sugihara Memorial Hall (Japan)
- Established: 2000
- Location: Yaotsu, Japan
- Coordinates: 35.474878868099076°N 137.16843525365272°E
- Type: Museum
- Website: www.sugihara-museum.jp/index_en.html

The Chiune Sugihara Memorial Hall is a museum in Yaotsu, Gifu, Japan.

The museum tells visitors the story of Chiune Sugihara, a Japanese diplomat who saved the lives of thousands of Jews while living in Kaunas, Lithuania. The museum features ten sections including a re-creation of the Japanese consulate office in Lithuania.

== History ==
The Chiune Sugihara Memorial Hall finished construction in 2000 and was funded by the Chiune Sugihara Memorial Hall. The hall was constructed with Japanese Cypress from Gifu and accentuate the cultural differences between Lithuania and Gifu. The hall underwent construction in 2017 where the interior of the hall was restored to look more authentic. The memorial hall has received around 200,000 visitors with roughly 2,000 visitors coming from Israel each year.

== Sections of the memorial hall ==
The memorial has ten sections which are marked with a letter A-J. Sections A and B provide visitors with background knowledge of the Holocaust and Jewish persecution by the Nazis. Sections C-E discuss Sugihara's decision to issue visas and how he helped Jews flee Europe. Sections F-J discuss the impact that Sugihara's visas had on those who escaped, and these sections also feature messages of gratitude from Jewish refugees and the Tsuruga Landing Accounts, stories from many Jewish refugees who eventually escaped to the Japanese port of Tsuruga. The memorial hall also features “The Decision”: a reconstruction of Sugihara's office in Kaunas, Lithuania, where visitors can ponder Sugihara's dilemma and come up with their own decision.

== Jindonooka Park ==
Jindonooka Park is the park where the Chiune Sugihara Memorial Hall was built. The park is divided into four sections: the Memorial Zone, Access Zone, Culture Zone and Amusement Zone. The park has two main monuments, the Sounding Out World Peace monument in the Memorial zone which communicates the hope for world peace and the monument is the Visas for Life monument which shows the hope created from Sugihara's visas. Both monuments were erected in 1996.

== Access ==
It is possible to access the memorial hall by bus via Yaotsu's city center. However, due to lack of buses and problematic transfers most visitors choose to take a rental car.
