= Yaotsu =

Yaotsu 八百津町
- Town
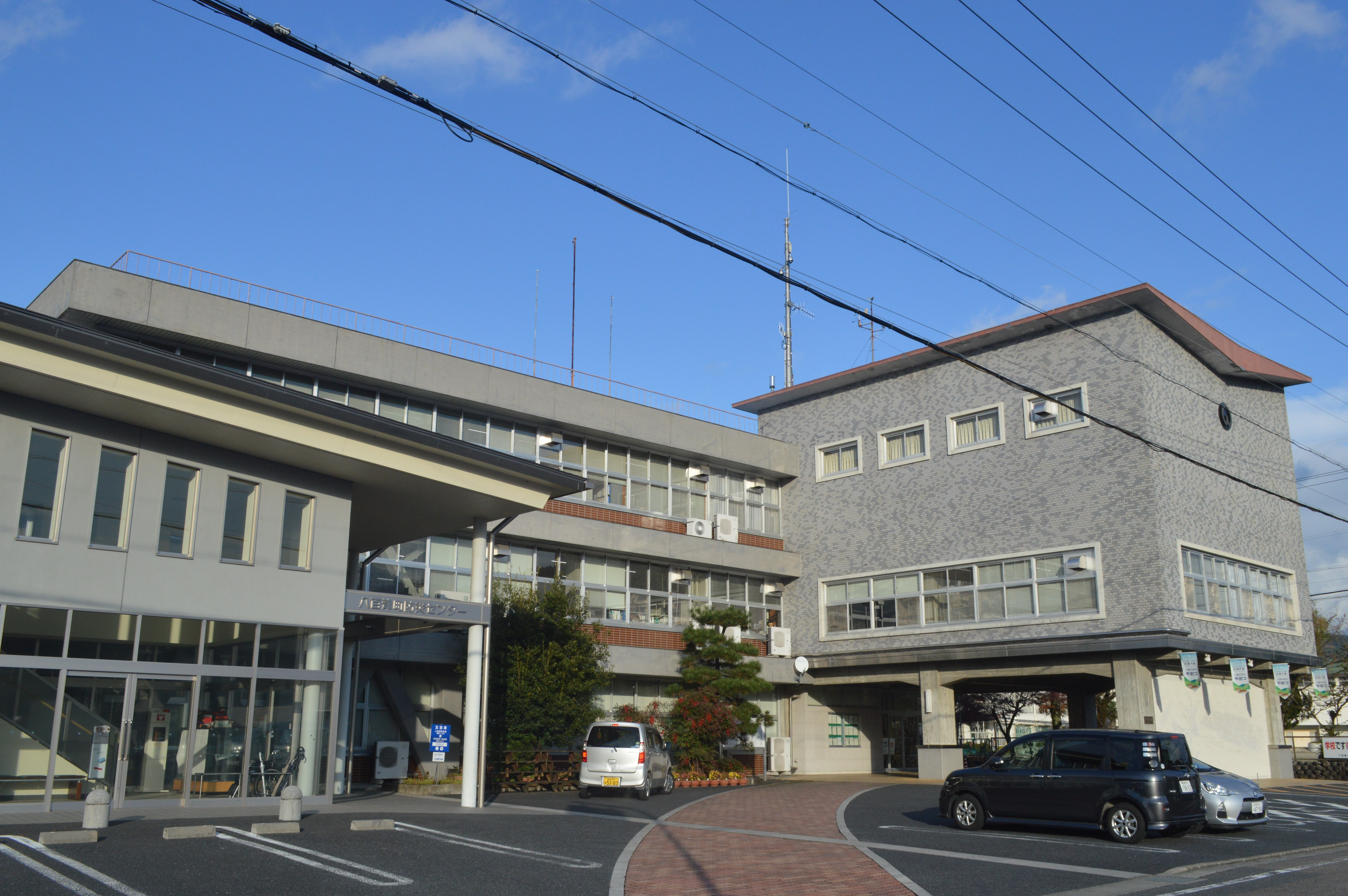
- Yaotsu Town Hall

- Flag Seal

- Location of Yaotsu in Gifu Prefecture

- Coordinates: 35°28′33.7″N 137°8′29.6″E
- Country: Japan
- Region: Chūbu
- Prefecture: Gifu
- District: Kamo

Government
  - Mayor: Masanori Kaneko

Area
  - Total: 128.79 km^{2} (49.73 sq mi)

Population (January 1, 2019)
  - Total: 11,036
  - Density: 85.690/km^{2} (221.94/sq mi)
- Time zone: UTC+9 (Japan Standard Time)
- City symbols
- Tree: Pine
- Flower: Lilium japonica
- Phone number: 0574-43-2111
- Address: Yaotsu 3903-2, Yaotsu-chō, Kamo-gun, Gifu-ken 505-0392
- Website: Official website

Yaotsu (八百津町, Yaotsu-chō) is a town located in Kamo District, Gifu Prefecture, Japan. As of 1 January 2019, the town had an estimated population of 11,036 and a population density of 886 persons per km^{2}, in 4311 households. The total area of the town was 128.79 square kilometres (49.73 sq mi).

== Geography ==
Yaotsu is located in south-central Gifu Prefecture, bordered by the Hida River to the north and the Kiso River to the south. Approximately 80% of the town area is forested. The town has a climate characterized by hot and humid summers, and mild winters (Köppen climate classification Cfa). The average annual temperature in Yaotsu is 15.0 °C. The average annual rainfall is 2019 mm with September as the wettest month. The temperatures are highest on average in August, at around 27.6 °C, and lowest in January, at around 3.1 °C.

=== Neighbouring municipalities ===
- Gifu Prefecture
  - Ena
  - Hichisō
  - Kani
  - Kawabe
  - Minokamo
  - Mitake
  - Mizunami
  - Shirakawa

== Demographics ==
According to Japanese census data, the population of Yaotsu has declined gradually over the past 50 years.

Historical population
Year	Pop.	±%
1970	16,396	—
1980	15,451	−5.8%
1990	14,731	−4.7%
2000	13,632	−7.5%
2010	12,045	−11.6%
2020	10,195	−15.4%

== History ==
The area around Yaotsu was part of traditional Mino Province. During the Edo period, the area was part of the territory controlled by Owari Domain under by the Tokugawa shogunate. With the post-Meiji restoration cadastral reforms, Kamo District within Gifu Prefecture was created, and the town of Yaotsu was established on July 1, 1897, with the creation of the modern municipalities system. Yaotsu annexed the neighbouring village of Chiwa in 1955 and villages of Kutami, Shionami and Fukuchi in 1956. A referendum to merge into the city of Minokamo, was defeated in 2004.

== Education ==
Yaotsu has five public elementary schools and two public junior high schools operated by the town government, and one public high school operated by the Gifu Prefectural Board of Education.

== Transportation ==
=== Railway ===
- Yaotsu does not have any passenger railway service.

=== Bus ===
- The only form of public transport that accesses Yaotsu is Yao Bus which serves western Yaotsu from Kani City.

=== Highway ===
- National Route 418

== Local attractions ==
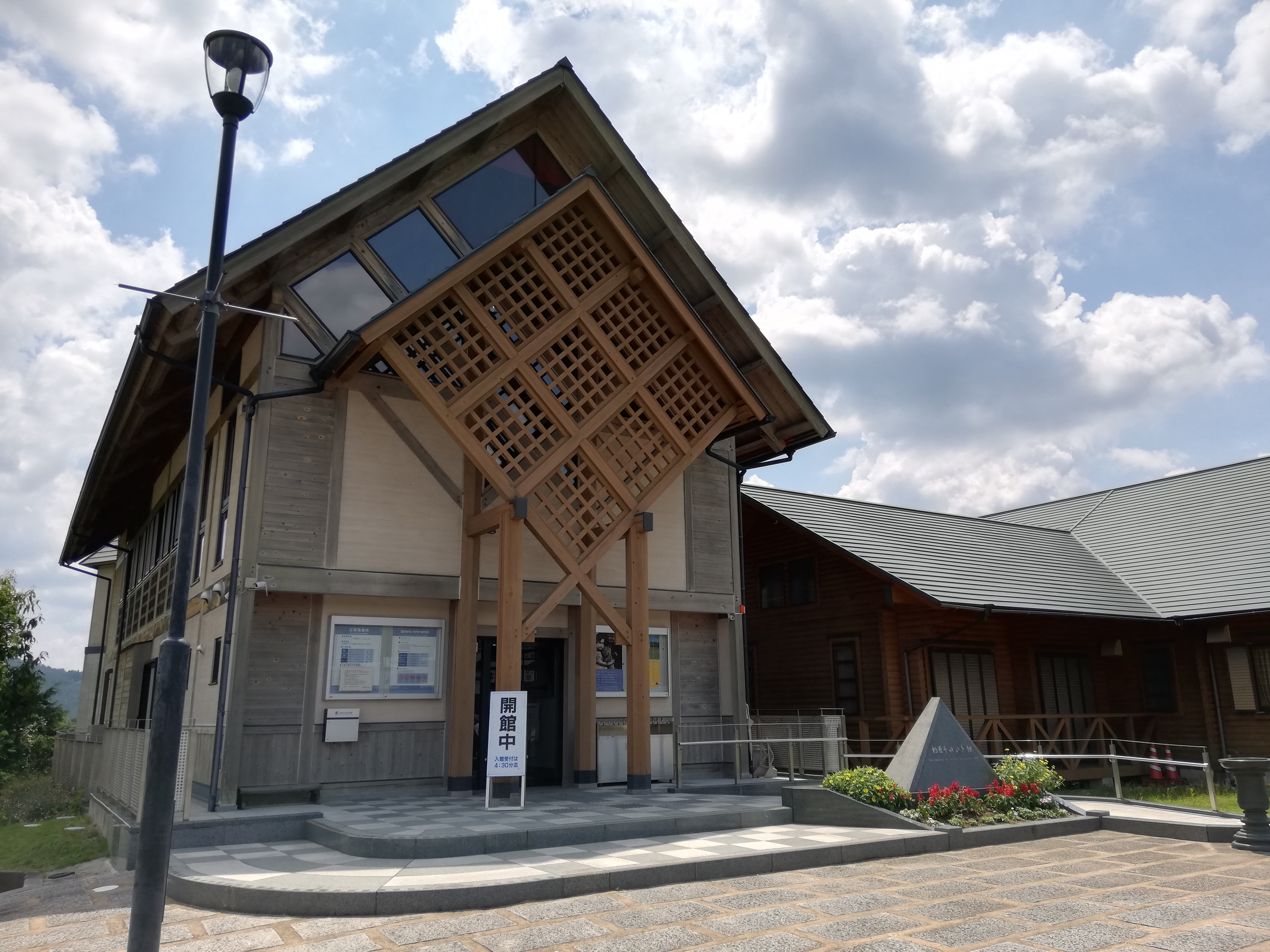
- The Chiune Sugihara Memorial Hall
  Futamata Tunnel (a.k.a. "Korea tunnel"(朝鮮トンネル)), claimed to be a haunted location as it was constructed during World War II by Korean forced labor, some of whom died in the construction and whose bodies were allegedly buried in the walls.
- Chiune Sugihara Memorial Hall, commemorating Japanese diplomat Chiune Sugihara and aiming to educate Japanese citizens on the history of Judaism in Europe and Japan. Yaotsu formerly claimed it was the birthplace of Chiune Sugihara based on two handwritten notes, and applied for registration as a "Memory of the World" to UNESCO; however, it was later determined that these notes were false and a family register proved that Sugihara was actually born in Mujiri-gun Kurichi-cho (present Mino City)
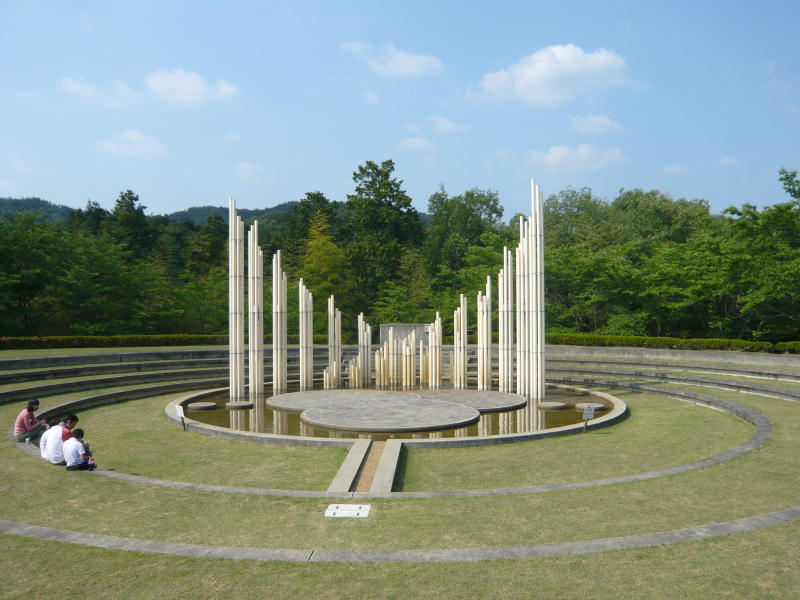
  JIndogaoka Monument
- Jindogaoka Park, Park outside of the Chiune Sugihara Memorial Hall with monuments to the Holocaust, Sugihara and to Japanese-Lithuanian relations.

== Sister cities ==
- Kaunas, Lithuania, since February 14, 2019

== Pig cholera ==
Gifu Prefecture announced that it was infected with a domestic animal infectious disease "pig cholera" although on November 26, 2018, it was found in a town wading field in the carcass of a wild boar. According to the prefecture, it is the first time that infected wild boar was found in the town. Neighbors found and delivered to the town. Because it was out of the area covered by the prefecture's survey, after examining the prefecture, we also conducted genetic tests at national research institutes, and both were positive. Furthermore, on December 2, it was also revealed that male wild boars captured by Kageuri trap in Yaotsu town (near Nanyo Temple) were infected with swine fever.

== Ya-o-chi ==
Ya-o-chi (やおっち) is a mascot created by the Yaotsu-cho village, Japan.

== Local issues ==
=== Acute myocardial infarction ===
The mortality rate of acute myocardial infarction (heart attack) is 3.8 times the national average. Especially for women, it is 3.9 times very high, and it is the municipality with the highest mortality rate in municipalities with population over 10,000.
