= Tsuruga Port =

Port on the Sea of Japan

Coordinates: 35°39′N 136°03′E

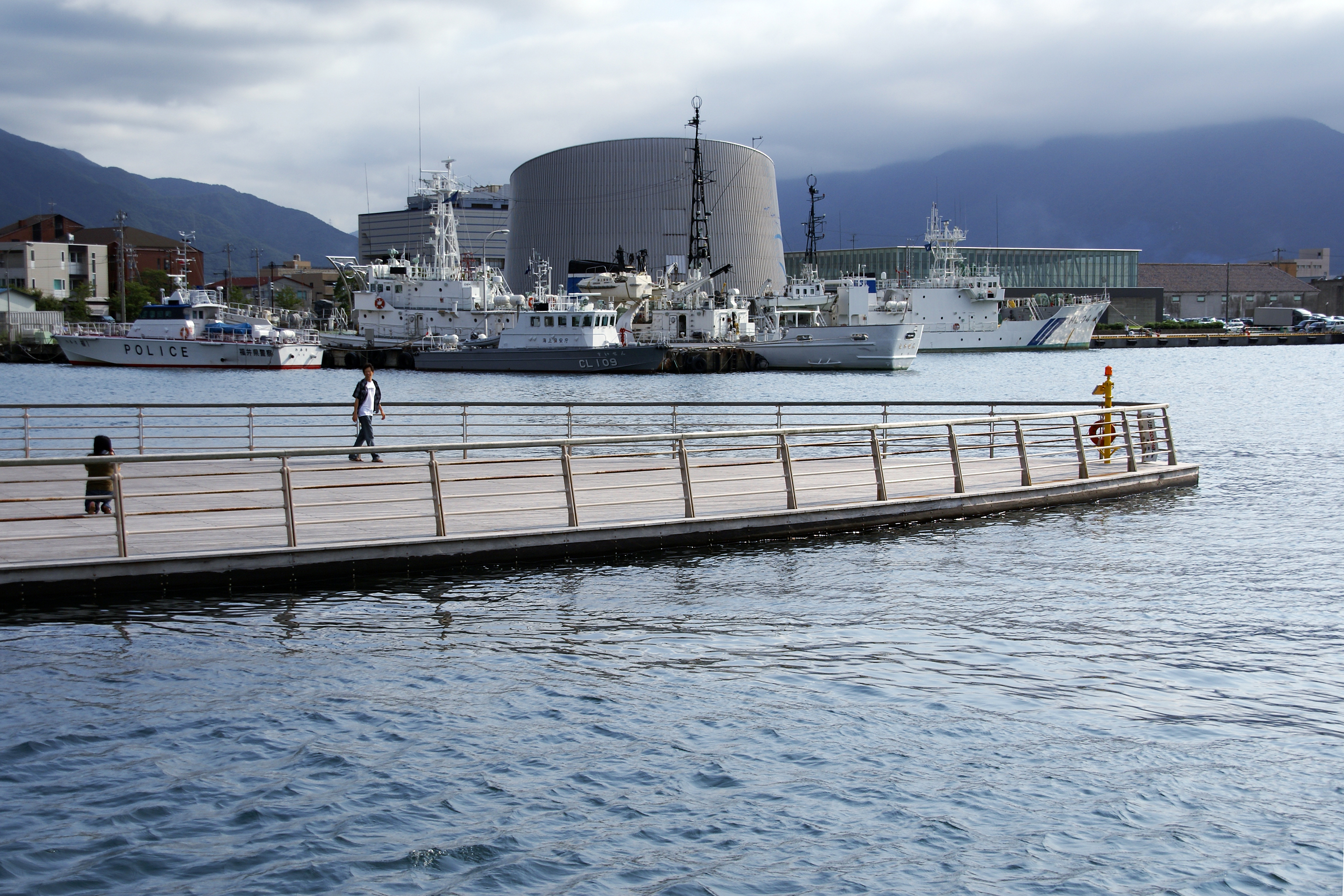
Tsuruga Port

The Tsuruga Port is one of the three main ports on the Sea of Japan.

== History ==
Since the early 9th century, Tsuruga port has been involved in Japan maritime trade.

Tsuruga Port has been prospering as a trade gateway between Japan and mainland Asia since the Nara era, and as transit base for Kitamaebune intra-Japan ships since the middle of Edo era.

In the Meiji era, shipping routes between Tsuruga, Korea, and Eastern Russia (Vladivostok) were opened, and in 1912, a railway connecting Tokyo with the port of Tsuruga was completed.

From 1940 to 1941, about 6,000 Jewish refugees landed in Tsuruga via Vladivostok from the Siberian Railway with the "Visa of Life" issued by Chiune Sugihara, a Japanese deputy consul in Lithuania.

=== Modern development ===
View over the city and port of Tsuruga from a hillside

Tsuruga port serves an important role as a gateway on the Sea of Japan for the Fukui Prefecture and the two major economic areas of Hanshin Industrial Region, Kansai Region, and Chukyo, Chubu Region, as well as with other regions of Japan and with foreign countries such as Korea, China and Russia.

Ships of different types, i.e. cargo and passenger ferries, container ships, Roll-on/roll-off ships and dry bulk ships call at Tsuruga port.

A three-weekly container service connects Tsuruga and Busan, the largest South Korean port. A bi-weekly Roll-on/roll-off ship service was also introduced with Busan in 2010 and has been in the meantime expanded to a five-weekly service, thereby providing vital links between these two ports.

Tsuruga Port includes the original "Main Port area", which was the birthplace of the port, and a "New Port area" which was opened in 2010 in the Mariyama area to serve the expanding freight logistics activities.

A coal-powered power station and cement factory are immediately north of the New Port area, served by large bulk ships.

== Tourist attractions ==
- Port of Humanity Tsuruga Museum A museum displays the history of Tsuruga Port.
- Tsuruga Red Brick Warehouse A historical monument in the area. Now used as a restaurant hall as well as diorama display of Tsuruga port during heyday of Tsuruta.
