= History of the Jews in Portugal =

The location of Portugal (dark green) in Europe (with possessions Azores and Madeira in circles)

The history of Portuguese Jews reaches back over two thousand years and is directly related to Sephardi history, a Jewish ethnic division that represents communities that originated in the Iberian Peninsula (Portugal and Spain). In the sixteenth and seventeenth centuries, Portuguese Jews emigrated to a number of European cities outside Portugal, where they established new Portuguese Jewish communities, including in Hamburg, Antwerp, and the Netherlands, which remained connected culturally and economically, in an international commercial network during the seventeenth and eighteenth centuries.

== Before Portugal ==
Jewish populations existed in Iberia long before Portugal became a separate kingdom, dating to the Roman era (province of Lusitania), but an attested Jewish presence in Portuguese territory can be documented only since 482 CE. Two Sephardic Jewish families, Rodriguez and Gradis, are traditionally said to have emigrated from Judaea to Iberia following the Bar Kokhba revolt, settling first in Portugal and later moving to Spain.

In 711 CE, the Islamic invasion of the Iberian Peninsula was seen by many in the Jewish population as a liberation, and marked as the beginning of what many have seen as a golden age (the Islamic Al-Andalus) even if the Jews, as well as the Christians (the Mozarabs of the Visigothic rite), under Muslim rule were considered dhimmi, who paid a special tax as non-Muslims but could openly practice their religion and live in autonomous communities.

Rapidly in the 8th century, the Christian kingdoms of the north mountainous areas of the Iberian Peninsula (Kingdom of Asturias) started a centuries' long military campaign against the Muslim invaders, the Christian reconquest. The Jews, since many of them knew Arabic, were used by the Christians as both spies and diplomats on the campaign. That granted them some respect although there was always prejudice. Major changes came to Jews in Portugal following the fall of the last Islamic kingdom of Granada to the Catholic Monarchs in 1492.

== History ==
=== Medieval Era ===
Christian Portugal achieved victory over the Muslims in the Reconquest of the peninsula, with King Afonso I of Portugal becoming monarch of the newly independent region. Afonso entrusted Yahia Ben Yahi III with the post of supervisor of tax collection and nominated him the first Chief-Rabbi of Portugal (a position always appointed by the King of Portugal). Jewish communities had been established prior to these years, an example of Jewish expansion can be seen in the town of Leiria founded by King Afonso I in 1135. The importance of the Jewish population to the development of the urban economy can be inferred from charters Afonso granted in 1170 to the non-Christian merchants living in Lisbon, Almada, Palmela and Alcacer. These charters guaranteed the Jewish minorities in the towns freedom of worship and the use of traditional law-codes. King Sancho I continued to honor these charters by protecting the Jewish community from rioting crusaders in 1189 by forcibly removing them from Lisbon. The importance of the Jewish community in the economy of Portugal can be inferred from the punishment against those who robbed merchant men, robbing either Muslim, Christian, and Jew was of equal severity. King Sancho I of Portugal continued his father's policy, making Jose Ibn-Yahya, the son of Yahia Ben Rabbi, High Steward of the Realm. The clergy, however, invoking the restrictions of the Fourth Council of the Lateran, brought considerable pressure to bear against the Jews during the reign of King Dinis I of Portugal, but the monarch maintained a conciliatory position.

The Faro Pentateuch, printed in 1487, was the first printed book published in Portugal. It was printed in Hebrew, and published by a Jew, Samuel Gacon, who had fled from the Spanish Inquisition.

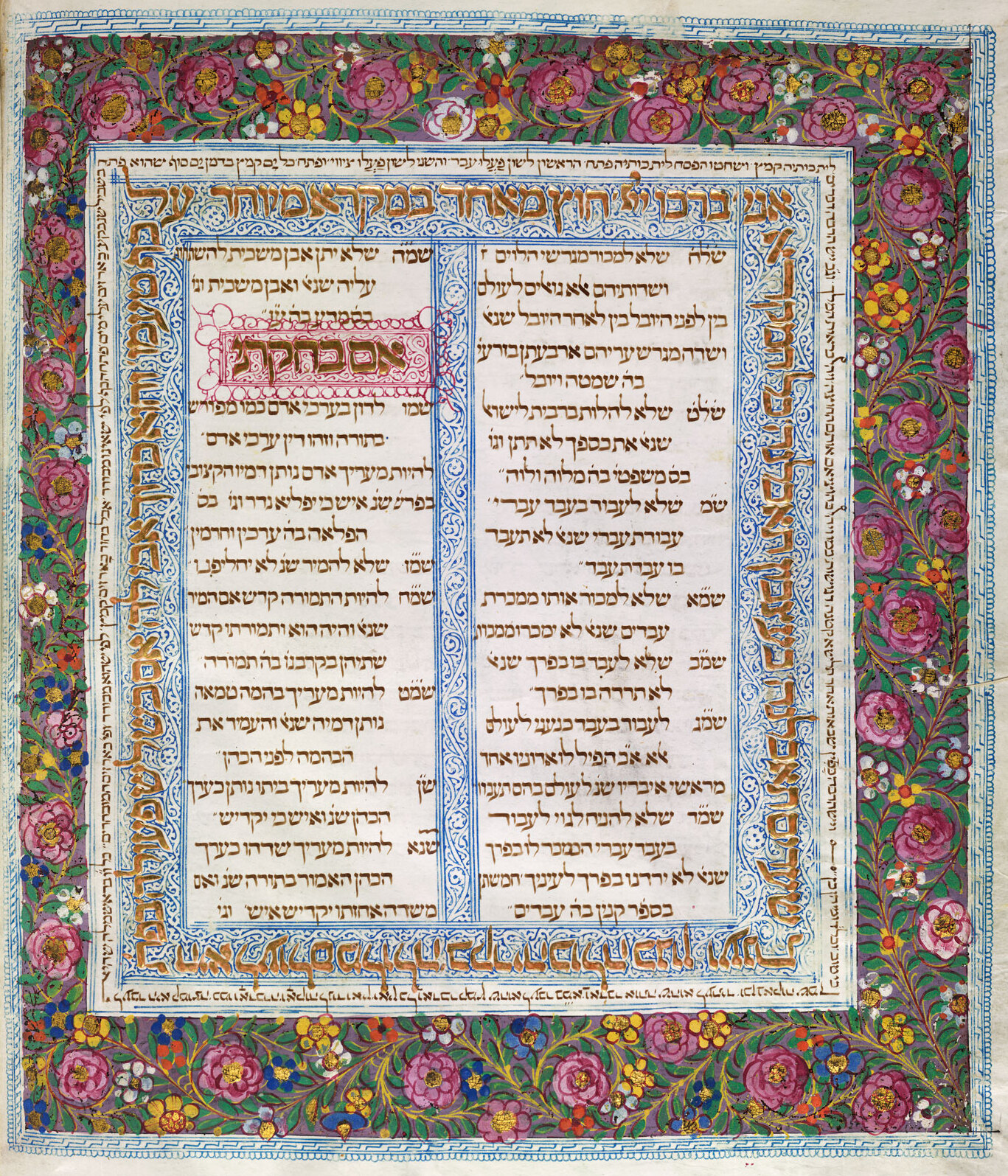
A folio from the Lisbon Bible (1482/3), at the British Library

Until the 15th century, some Jews occupied prominent places in Portuguese political and economic life. For example, Isaac Abrabanel was the treasurer of King Afonso V of Portugal. Many also had an active role in the Portuguese culture, and they kept their reputation of diplomats and merchants. By this time, Lisbon and Évora were home to important Jewish communities.

After the January 1492 fall of the last Islamic kingdom of Granada, the Catholic Monarchs of Spain issued a decree in March 1492, forcing Jews in Spain to either convert immediately to Christianity or leave Spain. Many fled to the kingdom of Portugal, whose monarch was more tolerant of a Jewish presence there. Portugal was the destination of most Jews who chose to leave Spain after their expulsion in 1492. Around 100,000 Spanish Jews decided to move to the neighboring Kingdom of Portugal, where a minor Jewish population already was residing.

The Portuguese were reluctant to admit the Jews into Portugal, but John II proposed to collect a tax of eight cruzados per person. Metal-workers and armorers would pay half. Officials were appointed to collect the tax at five points, issuing receipts which served as passports to enter Portugal. After eight months, the Portuguese crown would provide transport elsewhere at an additional fee. Six hundred wealthy families were offered a special contract to remain in Portugal and were settled in the larger cities. Those who could not afford the fee demanded from them by King John II after those eight months were declared his enslaved personal property and distributed to the Portuguese nobility. However, the Portuguese were not willing to house the large remaining population of Jewish immigrants. In some cases, Jewish families were housed within Christian households; in the city of Évora, the authorities refused to let in more Jewish families. King John II attempted to facilitate the transportation of Jewish families to other kingdoms.

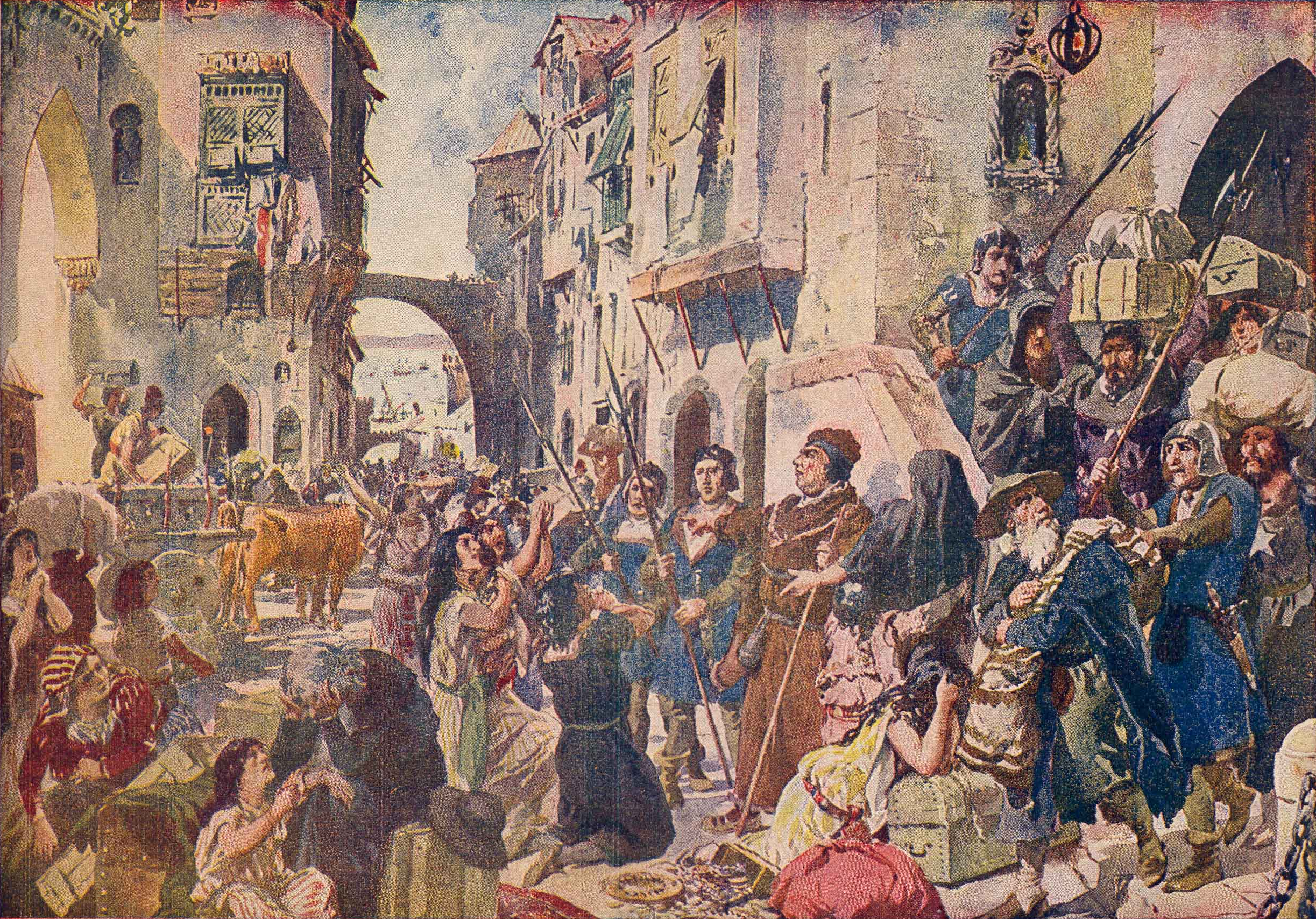
Expulsion of the Jews in 1497, in a 1917 watercolour by Alfredo Roque Gameiro

When Manuel I of Portugal married a daughter of the Spanish rulers, he was pressed to align his policies with theirs. In December 1496, King Manuel I decreed that all Jews and Muslims in Portugal had until October 1497 to either be baptized or leave the country. In this way, many Jews were expelled, while others were integrated into Portuguese society.

=== Portuguese overseas voyages ===
Scientific developments by Portuguese Jews made a direct contribution to Portugal's age of exploration. In 1497, Vasco da Gama took Abraham Zacuto's tables and the astrolabe with him on the maiden trip to India. The astrolabe would continue to be used by Portuguese ships thereafter to reach far destinations such as Brazil and India.

Zacuto might have an uncredited appearance in Luís de Camões's 1572 epic poem, The Lusiad, as the unnamed "old man of Restelo beach", a Cassandra-like character that surges forward just before Vasco da Gama's departure to chide the vanity of fame and warn of the travails that await him (Canto IV, v.94-111). This may be Camões' poetic interpretation of an alleged meeting (reported in Gaspar Correia) between Vasco da Gama and the older Abraham Zacuto at a monastery by Belém beach, just before his fleet's departure, in which Zacuto reportedly gave Gama some final navigational tips and warned him of dangers to avoid.

The so-called Amazonian Jews did not arrive in Brazil during the colonial era, but rather are descended from Moroccan Jews who immigrated to the Amazon region during the Amazon rubber boom.

=== Inquisition, persecutions and expulsions ===
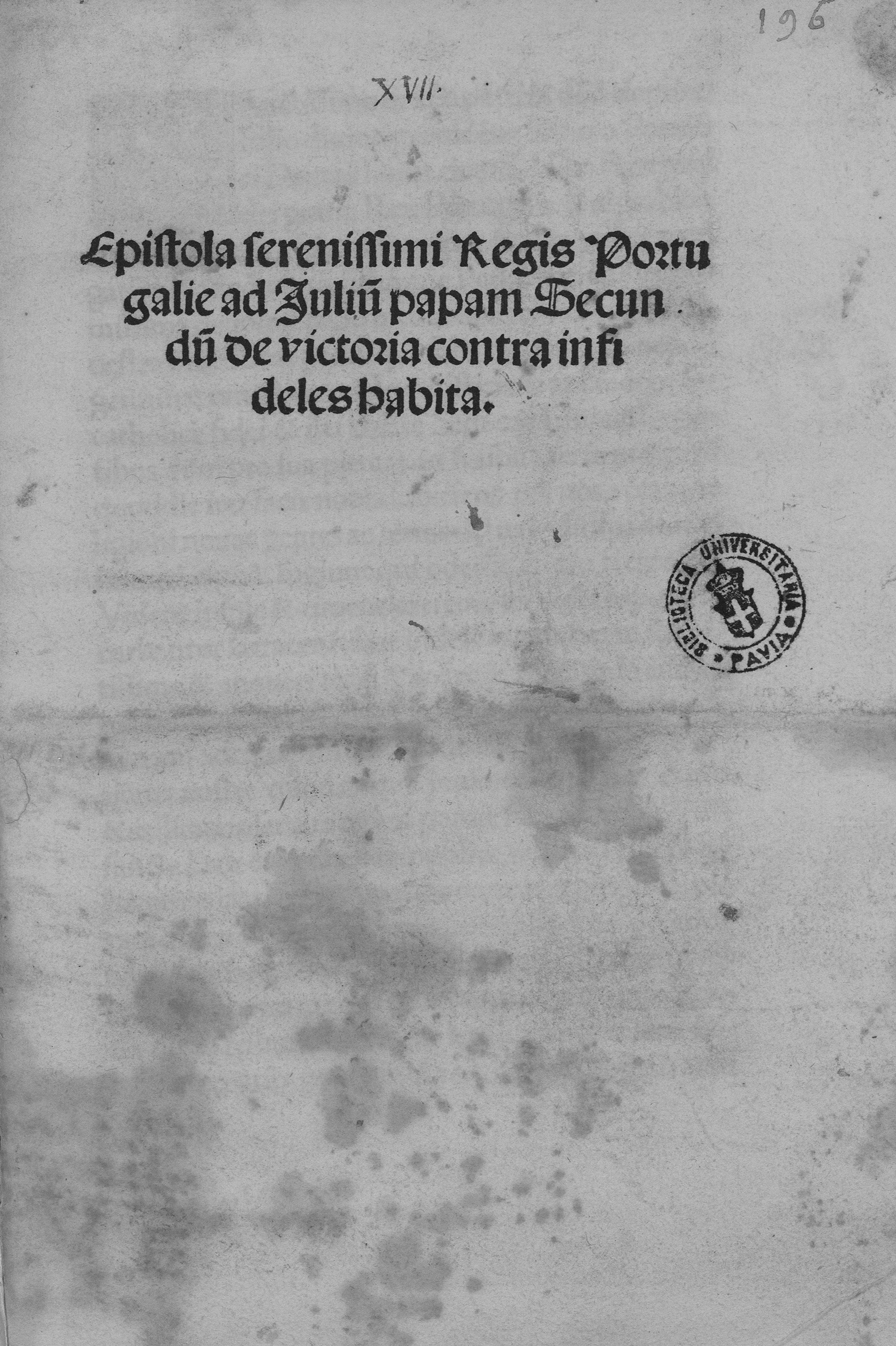
Epistola de victoria contra infideles habita, 1507

Spain instituted the Spanish Inquisition in 1478 before decreeing the expulsion of all Jews from Spain in 1492. Tens of thousands of Spanish Jews fled Spain, including to Portugal, where King John II granted them asylum in return for payment. However, the asylum was withdrawn after eight months, with the Portuguese government decreeing the enslavement of all Jews who had not left Portugal. In 1493, King John deported several hundred Jewish children to the newly formed colony of São Tomé, where many of them perished.

King John died in 1495, and the new king Manuel I of Portugal at first restored the freedom of the Jews. However, in 1496, under Spanish pressure as part of the marriage of Isabella, Princess of Asturias, the Church, and some Christians among the Portuguese people, King Manuel decreed that all Jews had to convert to Christianity or leave the country without their children by October 1497. The initial edict of expulsion of 1496 was then turned into an edict of forced conversion in 1497, whereby Portuguese Jews were prevented from leaving the country and were forcibly baptized and converted to Christianity. Hard times followed for the Portuguese Jews, with the massacre of 2000 conversos in Lisbon in 1506, further forced deportations to São Tomé (where there is still a Jewish presence today), and the relatively late establishment of the Portuguese Inquisition in 1536.

In 1525, David Reubeni, a Jewish man who claimed to be the commander of a Jewish army in the Ottoman Empire, arrived in Portugal. With the approval of the Pope, he sought the Portuguese king's assistance in providing him with ammunition to fight against the Muslims. Reubeni stayed in Portugal for several months, during which he sparked messianic expectations among the New Christians. His actions also led to the conversion of Solomon Molcho, which ultimately resulted to the King of Portugal expelling Reubeni from the country.

Jews in Portugal were forced to convert to Christianity, but were largely allowed to practice their religion in private. Portugal did not immediately establish an Inquisition until 1536. The Inquisition held its first Auto da fé in Portugal in 1540. Like the Spanish Inquisition, it concentrated its efforts on rooting out converts from other faiths (overwhelmingly Judaism) who did not adhere to the strictures of Catholic orthodoxy; like in Spain, the Portuguese inquisitors mostly targeted the Jewish New Christians, conversos, or marranos. The Portuguese Inquisition expanded its scope of operations from Portugal to the Portuguese Empire, including Brazil, Cape Verde, and India. According to Henry Charles Lea between 1540 and 1794 tribunals in Lisbon, Porto, Coimbra and Évora burned 1,175 persons, another 633 were burned in effigy and 29,590 were penanced. The Portuguese Inquisition was extinguished in 1821 by the "General Extraordinary and Constituent Courts of the Portuguese Nation".

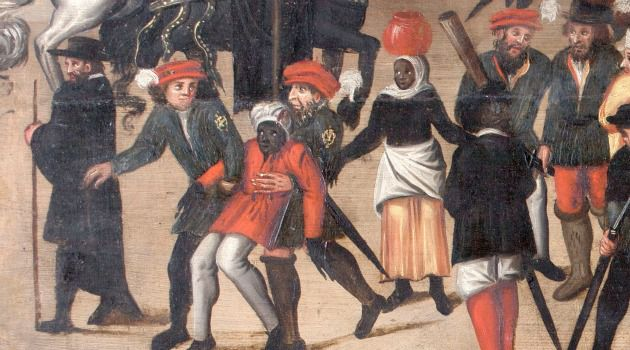
The men in uniform and long beards in this fragment of the 16th-century painting Chafariz d'El-Rey may be Jews.

When Philip II of Spain succeeded to the crown of Portugal in 1580, Portuguese Jews there were increasingly under threat. Portuguese Jews, "Hebrews of the Portuguese Nation", migrated to cities outside Portugal, including Hamburg, Antwerp, and the Netherlands, especially Amsterdam, the "Dutch Jerusalem". Many had been successful merchants in Portugal and they established an international trading network in the Atlantic world in the seventeenth and eighteenth centuries. The vast majority would eventually emigrate to Amsterdam, Thessaloniki, Constantinople (Istanbul), France, Morocco, Brazil, Curaçao and the Antilles. In some of these places their presence can still be witnessed, as in the use of the Ladino language by some Jewish communities in Turkey, the Portuguese-based dialects of the Netherlands Antilles, or the multiple synagogues built by what was to be known as the Spanish and Portuguese Jews (such as the Amsterdam Esnoga or Bevis Marks Synagogue in the City of London).

The prohibitions, persecution and eventual Jewish mass emigration from Spain and Portugal probably had adverse effects on the development of the Portuguese economy. Jews and non-Catholic Christians reportedly had substantially better numerical skills than the Catholic majority, which might be due to the Jewish religious doctrine, which focused strongly on education, for example, because Torah-reading was compulsory for men. Even when Jewish men were forced to quit their highly skilled urban occupations, their numeracy advantage persisted. However, during the inquisition, spillover-effects of these skills were rare because of forced separation and Jewish emigration, which was detrimental for economic development.

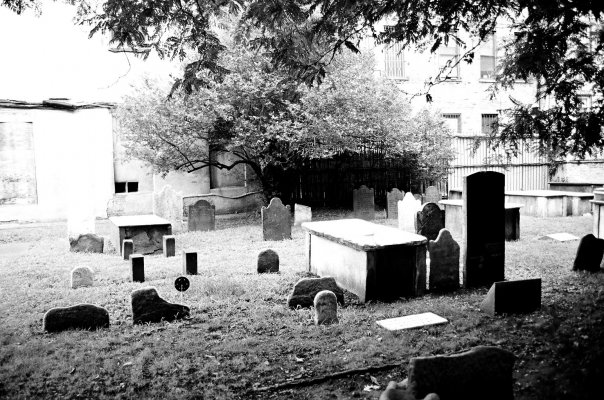
The first Cemetery of the first Spanish and Portuguese community Synagogue (Shearith Israel, active 1656–1833), Manhattan, New York City.

Despite strong persecution, conversos of Jewish ancestry did stay in Portugal initially. Of those, a significant number converted to Christianity as a mere formality, practicing their Jewish faith in private. These Crypto-Jews were known as New Christians, and would be under the constant surveillance of the Inquisition – to such an extent that most of these, would eventually leave the country in the centuries to come and again embrace openly their Jewish faith, joining the communities of Spanish and Portuguese Jews in places such as Amsterdam, London or Livorno.

Some of the most famous descendants of Portuguese Jews who lived outside Portugal are the philosopher Baruch Spinoza (from Portuguese Bento de Espinosa), who was expelled from the Portuguese Jewish community of Amsterdam;Rabbi Solomon Molcho, mystic and messiah claimant; Rabbi Menasseh Ben Israel, trained as a rabbi in Amsterdam; Uriel da Costa a precursor of Spinoza and modern biblical criticism; and the classical economist David Ricardo.

Very few Jews, the Belmonte Jews, went for a different and radical solution, practicing their faith in a strict secret isolated community. Known as the Marranos, some dozens have survived until today (basically only the community from the small town of Belmonte, plus some more isolated families) by the practice of inmarriage and few cultural contact with the outside world. Only recently, have they re-established contact with the international Jewish community and openly practice religion in a public synagogue with a formal rabbi.

=== Modern era ===
In the 19th century, with the end of the inquisition, some affluent families of Sephardi Jewish Portuguese origin, namely from Morocco and Gibraltar, returned to Portugal (such as the Ruah, Bensaúde, Anahory, Abecassis, and Buzzaglo). Jews were formally allowed back in Portugal near the year 1800. The first synagogue to be built in Portugal since the 15th century was the Lisbon Synagogue, inaugurated in 1904.

==== World War II ====
A new chapter for Jews in Portugal was marked by World War II. From 1932 Portugal was under the nationalist regime of António de Oliveira Salazar, but Portuguese nationalism was not grounded on race or biology. In 1934 Salazar made it clear that Portuguese nationalism did not include pagan anti-human ideals that glorified a race, and in 1937, he published a book where he criticized the ideals behind the Nuremberg laws. In 1938, he sent a telegram to the Portuguese Embassy in Berlin ordering that it should be made clear to the German Reich that Portuguese law did not allow any distinction based on race and therefore Portuguese Jewish citizens could not be discriminated against.

In 1937, Adolfo Benarus, Honorary Chairman of COMASSIS and a leader of the Lisbon's Jewish Community published a book where he rejoiced with the fact that there was no antisemitism in Portugal.

Portuguese Jewish scholar and economist Moses Amzalak, leader of the Lisbon Jewish community for more than fifty years (from 1926 until 1978), believed that Nazis were defending Europe from communism. Later, when Nazi antisemitic policies became evident, Amzalak got actively involved in rescue operations leveraging his friendship with Salazar.

Yad Vashem historian Avraham Milgram says that modern antisemitism failed "to establish even a toehold in Portugal" while it grew racist and virulent elsewhere in early twentieth-century Europe.

Early in September 1939, Portugal proclaimed its neutrality to combat threats to its colonial possessions from nations in both the Allied and Axis camps. Nonetheless, its sympathies were clearly on the side of the allies following Germany's invasion of the Catholic nation of Poland.

Upon the declaration of war, the Portuguese Government announced that the Anglo-Portuguese Alliance remained intact, but since the British did not seek Portuguese assistance, Portugal would remain neutral. The British Government confirmed the understanding. From the British perspective, Portuguese non-belligerency was essential to keep Spain from entering the war on the side of the Axis."

At the outbreak of World War II, to the nearly 400 Jews that were living in Portugal an additional 650 Jewish refugees from Central Europe were granted a quasi-resident status. However, under threat of military action from the Nazis Salazar issued orders on 11 November 1939, that consuls were not to issue Portuguese visas to "foreigners of indefinite or contested nationality; the stateless; or Jews expelled from their countries of origin". This order was followed only six months later by one stating that "under no circumstances" were visas to be issued without prior case-by-case approval from Lisbon. Portugal's regime did not distinguish between Jews and non-Jews but rather between immigrant Jews who came and had the means to leave the country and those lacking them. Portugal prevented Jews from putting down roots in the country not because they were Jews but because the regime feared foreign influence in general, and feared the entrance of Bolsheviks and left-wing agitators fleeing from Germany. Antisemitic ideological patterns had no hold in the ruling structure of the "Estado Novo" and a fortiori in the various strata of Portuguese society.

Germany's invasion of France in 1940 brought the Nazis to the Pyrenees which allowed Hitler to bring unanticipated pressures on both Spain and Portugal.

On 26 June 1940, the main HIAS-HICEM (Jewish relief organization) European Office was authorized by Salazar to be transferred from Paris to Lisbon.

A few weeks later, in the summer of 1940, the Jewish community on the Portuguese island of Madeira also grew considerably due to the Evacuation of the Gibraltarian civilian population during World War II to Madeira, which included a number of Jews, who attended the Synagogue of Funchal. Some of these evacuees were buried in the Jewish Cemetery of Funchal.

Following the Nazi invasion of Russia which cut off their supply of wolfram (tungsten) from Asia, Germany initiated tactics to extract wolfram from Portugal, initially by artificially running up prices in an attempt to get the people to bypass the Portuguese government and sell directly to German Agents. Salazar's government attempted to limit this and in October 1941 Germany retaliated by sinking a Portuguese merchant ship, the first neutral ship to be attacked during World War II. Germany torpedoed a second Portuguese ship in December. England then invoked long-standing treaties with Portugal dating from 1373 (Anglo-Portuguese Alliance) and 1386 (Treaty of Windsor) and Portugal honored these by granting a military base in the Azores to the Allies. The Allies then promised all possible aid in the event of a German attack against Portugal. Portugal continued to export wolfram and other goods to both Allied countries and Germany (partly via Switzerland) until 1944 when Portugal declared a total embargo of wolfram to Germany.

Despite Salazar's strict policy, efforts to provide entry visas into Portugal to Jews via rescue operations continued. The number of refugees that has escaped through Portugal during the war has estimates that range from one hundred thousand to one million, an impressive number considering the size of the country's population at that time (circa 6 million). "In 1940 Lisbon, happiness was staged so that God could believe it still existed," wrote the French writer Antoine de Saint-Exupéry.

=== Twenty-first century ===
For his efforts in rescuing thousands of refugees fleeing Nazi-occupied France, Sousa Mendes has been honored by Israel as one of the Righteous Among The Nations. The escape route remained active throughout the war, allowing an estimated one million refugees to escape from the Nazis through Portugal during World War II.

The Portuguese Ambassador in Budapest, Carlos Sampaio Garrido and the Chargé d'Affaires Carlos de Liz-Texeira Branquinho, helped an estimated 1,000 Hungarian Jews in 1944. They rented houses and apartments in the outskirts of Budapest to shelter and protect refugees from deportation and murder. On 28 April 1944, when the Hungarian secret police (counterparts to the Gestapo) raided the Ambassador's home and arrested his guests, the Ambassador physically resisted the police and was also arrested, but he managed to have his guests released on the grounds of ex-territorially of diplomatic legations. In 2010 Sampaio Garrido was recognized as Righteous Among the Nations by Yad Vashem.

Other Portuguese who deserve further credit for saving Jews during the war are Professor Francisco Paula Leite Pinto and Moisés Bensabat Amzalak. A devoted Jew and a Salazar supporter, Amzalak headed the Lisbon Jewish community for more than fifty years, from 1926 until 1978.

== Communities ==
The roots of Portuguese Jewry lay way prior to the forging of the Portuguese kingdom. When Afonso I of Portugal obtained recognition of his independent kingdom, in 1143, Jews had lived in the Iberian Peninsula for at least one millennium.

Later, with the Edict of expulsion of the Jews by Manuel I (1496) and the official establishment of the Portuguese Inquisition by John III (1536) came a period of intolerance and prejudice that lasted for several centuries and led to the almost complete extermination of Judaism and the Jews in Portugal. It wasn't until the twentieth century that organized Jewish communities settled again in Portugal.

=== Lisbon ===
The Jewish Community of Lisbon (Portuguese: Comunidade Israelita de Lisboa - CIL) was officially recognized in 1913. It brings together the Jews of Lisbon. Its headquarters are on Avenida Alexandre Herculano, no.59 in Lisbon, where the synagogue Shaaré Tikvah (Gates of Hope) is located. According to its official website, the purpose of the Jewish Community of Lisbon is to promote religious education for the new generations according to the values of Judaism, to recruit new members and to strengthen its engagement in the local and national affairs, by means of dialogue and interaction with the authorities as well as with civil and religious institutions.

Shaaré Tikvah synagogue

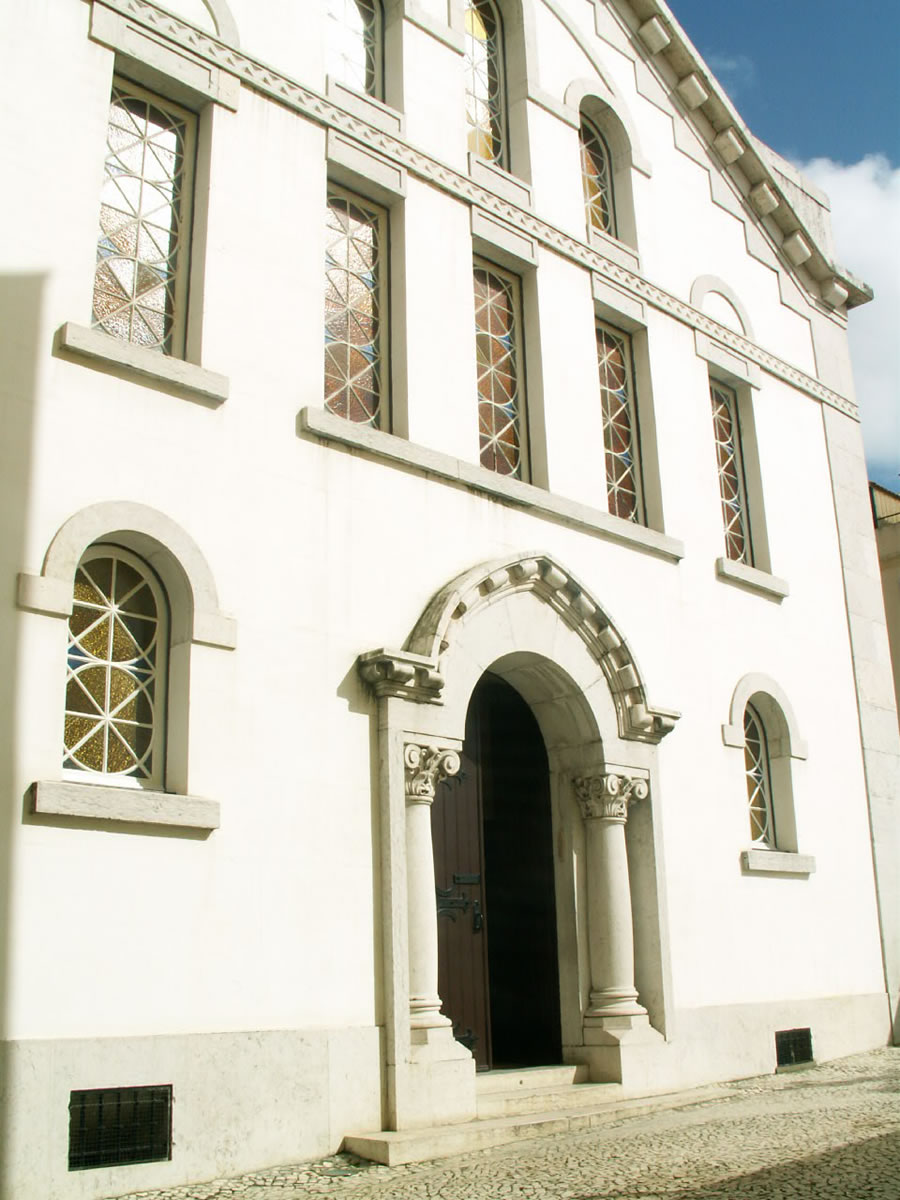
Facade

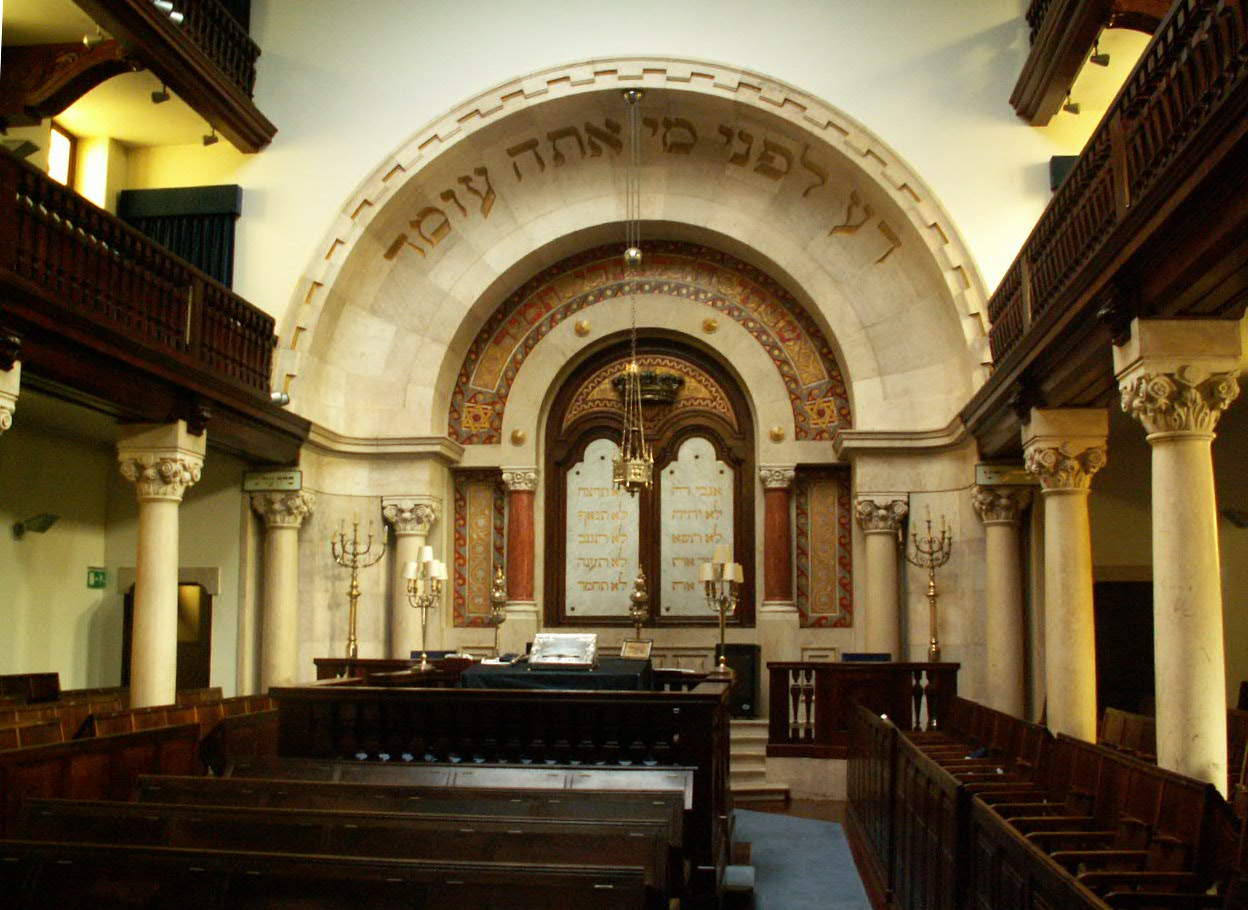
Interior

==== Ohel Jacob Synagogue ====
The Ohel Jacob Synagogue (“Tent of Jacob”) was founded in 1934 by a small Jewish group of Ashkenazic origin from Central Europe, which began by meeting at the premises of the now established Hehaber – Israel Youth Zionist character, which had been created by young Jews in Lisbon in 1925. This group of Jews, mostly Poles, would play a remarkable role in the dynamization of this religious space, a singular synagogue, characterized by its openness to the outside, tolerance and understanding for Jews of all origins, especially the integration of the descendants of Marranos – or b’nei anussim.

Ohel Jacob is the only reform synagogue in Portugal, and is under the guidance of Rabbi Alona Lisitsa. It is also an affiliate member of the European Union for Progressive Judaism (EUPJ) and World Union for Progressive Judaism (WUPJ).

=== Porto ===
The foundation of the synagogue dates to 1923, with the initiatives of the Jewish community in Porto and of Captain Artur Barros Basto, who converted to Judaism. Generally, three organized Jewish communities had existed in Portugal: in Lisbon, Porto and Belmonte; there are 6000 people who consider themselves Jewish. Captain Barros Basto was one of the most important figures in the community, linked to the founding of an organized Jewish movement in the northern community. There were at least twenty Ashkenazi Jews in the city; since there was no synagogue, they needed to travel to Lisbon for all their religious needs.

Barros Basto began to plan a synagogue, officially registering the local Jewish community, the Comunidade Israelita do Porto (Israelite Community of Porto), with the local government in 1923. During this time, the membership used a house on the Rua Elias Garcia. In 1927, Barros Basto founded the Portuguese Jewish newspaper Ha-Lapid.

In 1929, with the aim of trying to convert the Marranos that existed in Trás-os-Montes and Beiras into official Judaism, Barros Basto raised funds. On 13 November 1929 an application for the necessary licensing to begin work was delivered to the municipal council; a few weeks later, the first stone was laid and construction begun. The architects were Artur de Almeida Júnior and Augusto dos Santos Malta (who trained in the Escola das Belas Artes de Porto), in collaboration with interior designer Rogério de Azevedo. Rogério de Azevedo may have executed some of the finish work himself, as some touches, including woodwork in the library, were completed in a style characteristic of his work.

Between 1930 and 1935, the Israeli Technology Institute was installed in the building, even before its completion. The work progressed slowly until 1933, despite support from the Committee for Spanish-Portuguese Jews in London. In 1937, the synagogue was complete thanks to the contributions from the Jewish community in London and from funds donated by the Kadoorie family and Iraqi Jews from Portugal. Upon the death of Laura Kadoorie, the wife of prominent Mizrahi Jewish philanthropist Sir Elly Kadoorie, her children wished to honor their mother, a descendant of Portuguese Jews who had fled the country following the Inquisition. This tribute was reflected in the monetary support by the Kadoorie family to assist in the construction of large part of the synagogue in Porto, which was later renamed Synagogue Kadoorie - Mekor Haim. In the same year, Captain Artur Barros Basto was expelled from the Portuguese army for his participation in circumcisions. The synagogue was inaugurated in 1938. The synagogue has always had a small number of members and, for much of the 20th century, has been entrusted to families in Central and Eastern Europe (Roskin, Kniskinsky, Finkelstein, Cymerman, Pressman and others), who married among themselves.

During the Second World War, hundreds of refugees passed through the doors of the synagogue en route to the United States.

Former Captain Barros Bastos died in 1961.

In 2012, the synagogue was opened to the public.

Representatives from an Israeli governmental agency visited in 2014 and approved co-financing for renovations and security upgrades. On 21 May 2015, the Jewish Museum of Porto was opened to the public. It was inaugurated on 28 June in the presence of the president of the Comunidade Israelita do Porto and various cultural, education and political personalities. A fence was erected along the sides and rear of the building.

The community counts among its members Jews of origins as diverse as Poland, Egypt, the United States, India, Russia, Israel, Spain, Portugal and England. The present rabbi is Daniel Litvak, a native of Argentina, and the current vice president is Isabel Ferreira Lopes, the granddaughter of Captain Barros Basto.

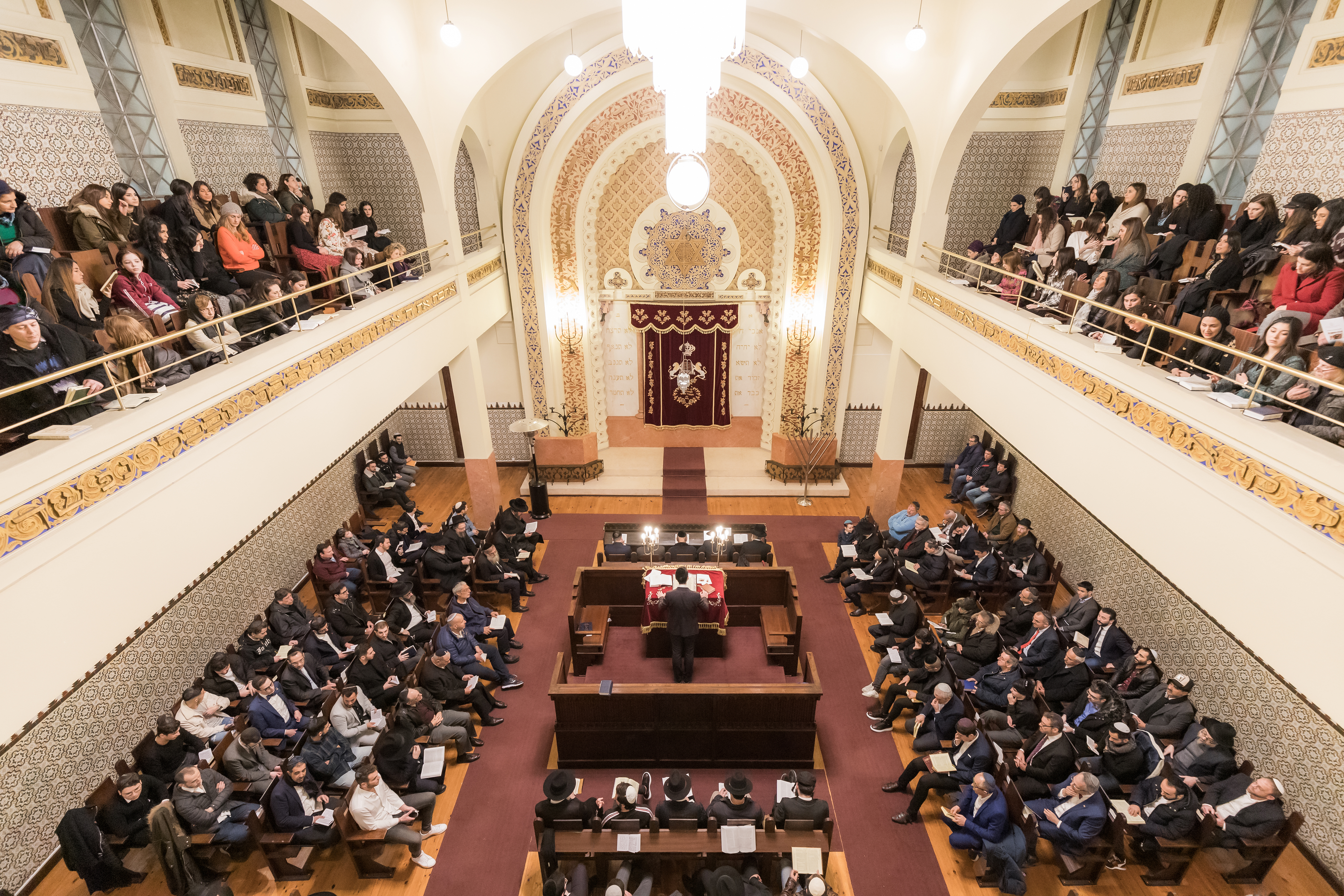
Shabbaton 2020

According to the official blog of the community, it includes about 500 Jews originally from more than thirty countries and gathers all standards and degrees of observance of Judaism. In recent years, the members of the community have connected the organization with the rest of the Jewish world, written the Community's rules, restored the synagogue building, organized departments and created the necessary conditions for Jewish life to flourish again in Porto. The organisation has a beit din, two official rabbis, and structures for kashrut. It offers courses to schoolteachers to combat antisemitism, and has a museum, a cinema, films about its history, and cooperation protocols with the Portuguese state, the Israeli Embassy to Portugal, B'nai B'rith International, the Anti-Defamation League, Keren Hayesod, and Chabad Lubavitch, as well as with the Porto Diocese and Porto's Muslim community.

In January 2019, the President of the Republic, Marcelo Rebelo de Sousa, visited the Porto Synagogue, where he attended the celebration of the Shabbat Cabalat, after which he took the floor. Upon arrival, the Head of State was received by the President of the Jewish Community of Porto, Dias Ben Zion, and by the Chief Rabbi, Daniel Litvak.

In September 2020, the Jewish Community of Porto was received by the Mayor of Porto, Rui Moreira, in the City Hall. The Mayor welcomed the leadership of a rapidly growing and rejuvenating community in the city, representing about 500 Jews from more than 30 countries.

In 2021, the Holocaust Museum of Porto was inaugurated.

Kadoorie Mekor Haim synagogue

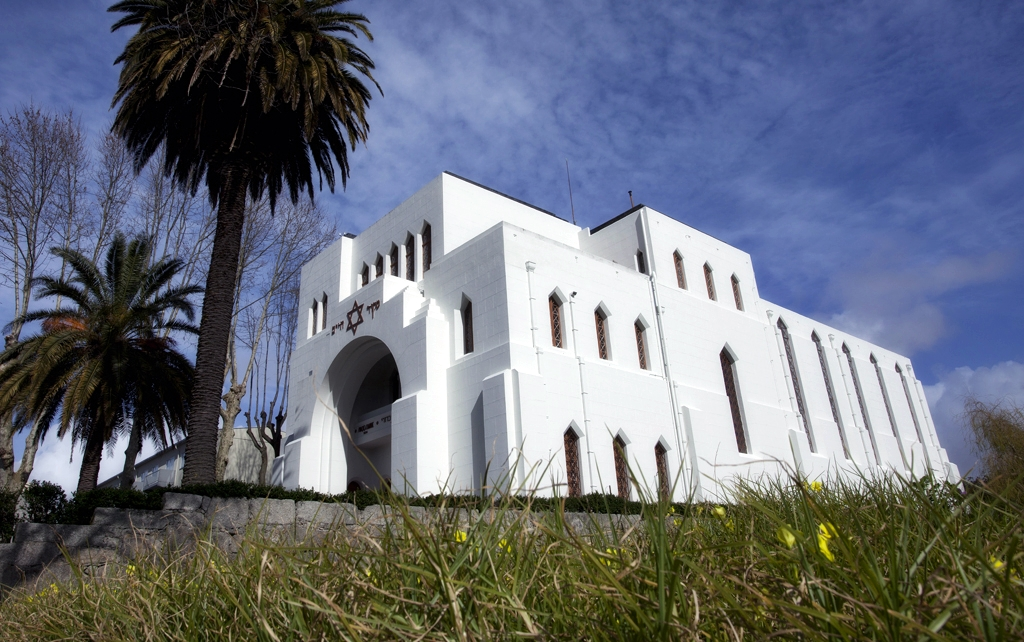
Facade

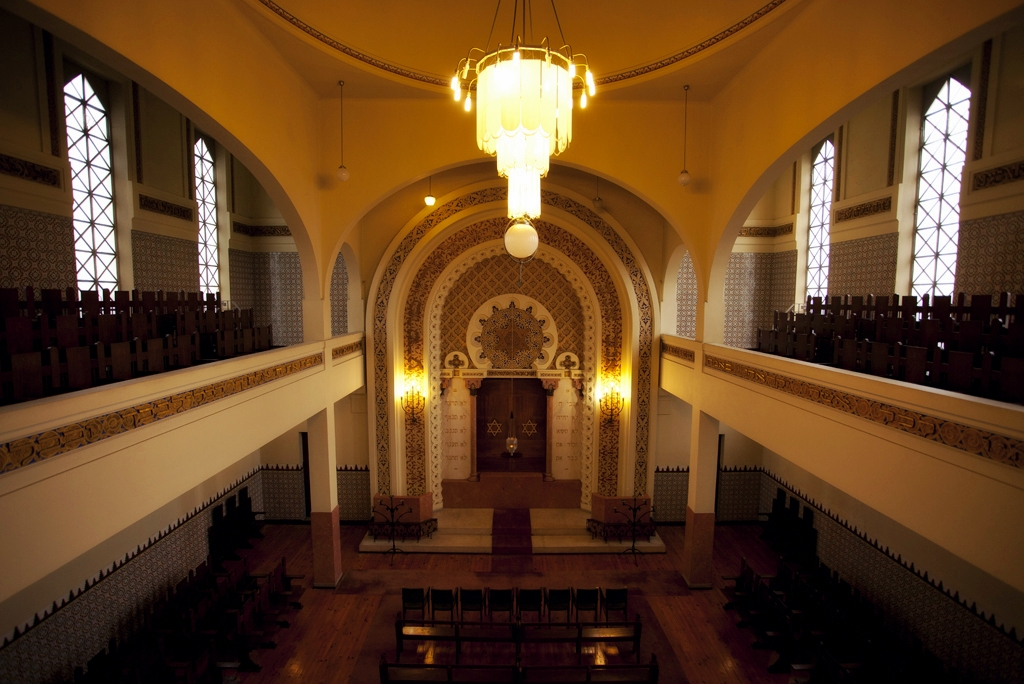
Interior

=== Belmonte ===
The Jewish community of Belmonte was officially recognized in 1989. It brings together the Jews of Belmonte and its surroundings. Its headquarters are located in Rua Fonte Rosa, 6250-041, Belmonte, where the Synagogue Beit Eliahu (House of Elijah) was built. According to the official blog of the Jewish community of Belmonte, this is the only community in Portugal that can be considered truly Portuguese. Its members are descendants of crypto-Jews that managed to preserve many of the rites, prayers and social relations throughout the period of the Inquisition, marrying inside a community constituted by a few families. The Museu Judaico de Belmonte (Judaic Museum of Belmonte) inaugurated in 2005, was the first museum of that kind in Portugal.

Beit Eliahu synagogue

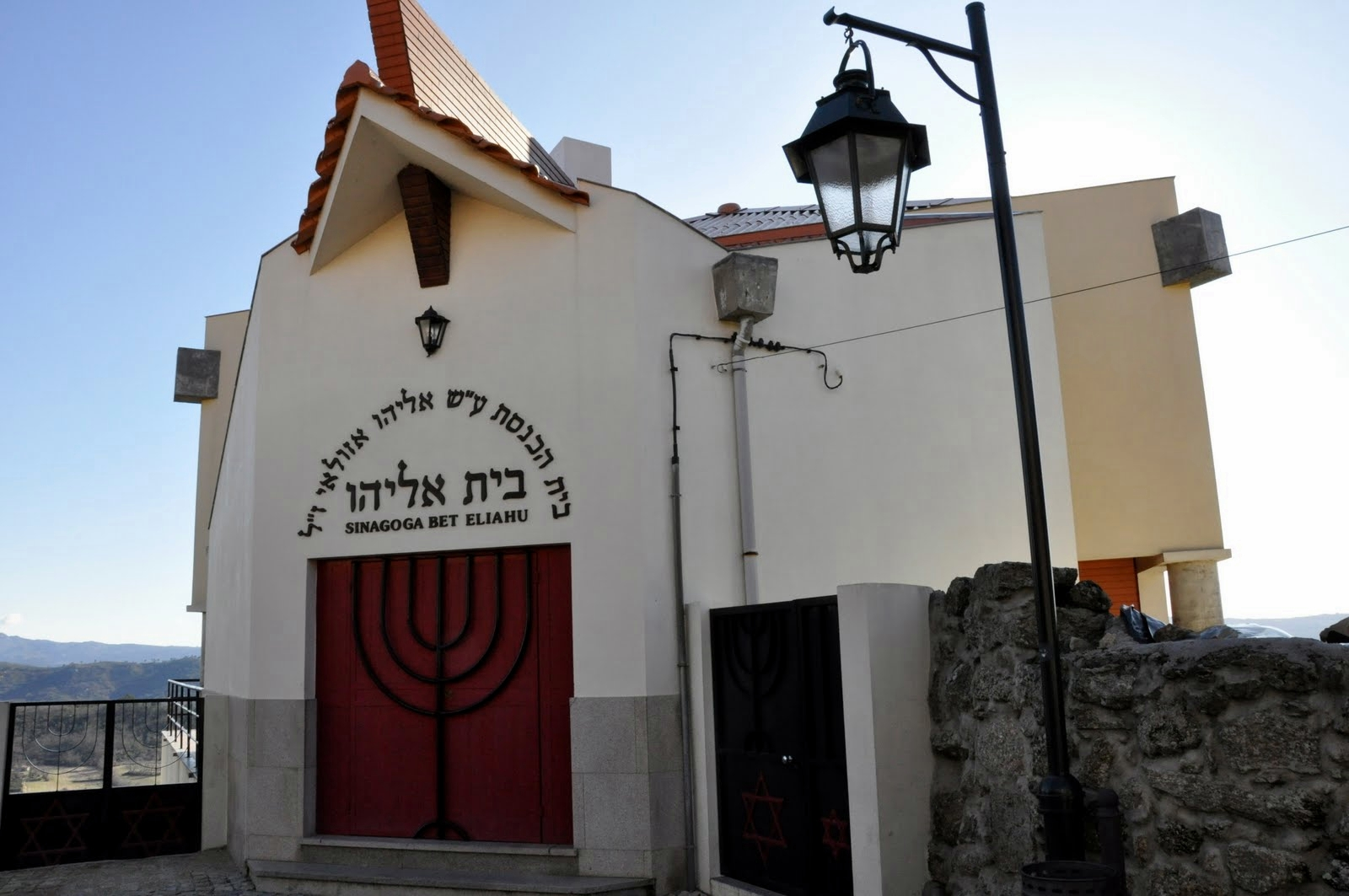
Facade

=== Cascais ===
The Avner Cohen Chabad House is a Jewish community centre situated in Cascais in the Lisbon District. It includes a library that places special emphasis on works about the Torah, either those written by Portuguese Jewish scholars or printed in Portugal in the late 15th-century. This is the first Chabad House to be established in Portugal, having been opened in 2019.

=== Migration to Israel ===
Portuguese people in Israel
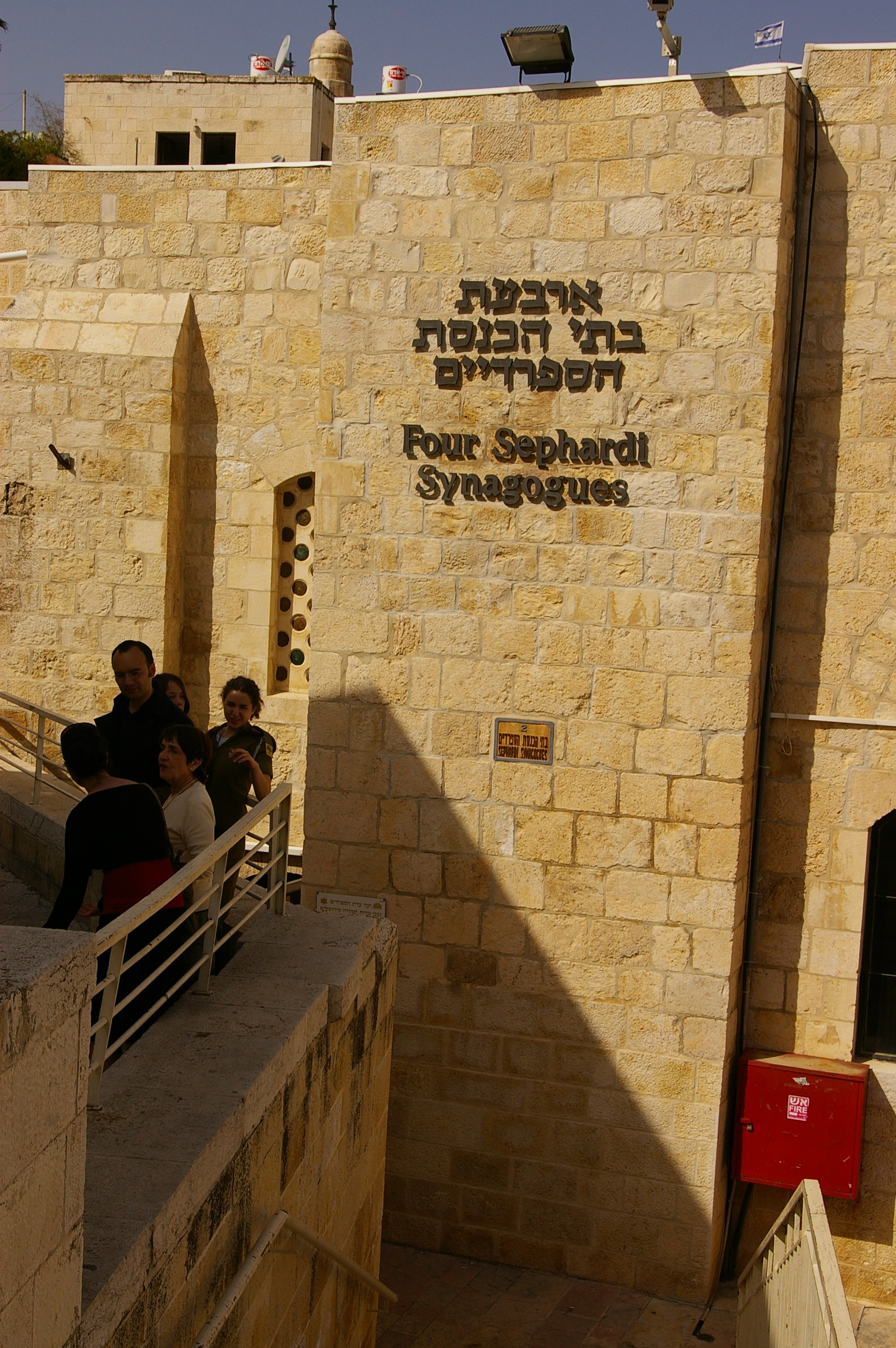

Total population
- 10,000

Regions with significant populations
- Jerusalem (with an extremely important and significant minority in Tel Aviv)

Languages
- Portuguese

Religion
- Roman Catholicism, Judaism

The Portuguese people are the fifth largest Western European immigrant group in Israel, after Dutch people, French people, Britons and Germans. Also, Israel is home to the largest Portuguese immigrant community in Middle East.

== Present ==
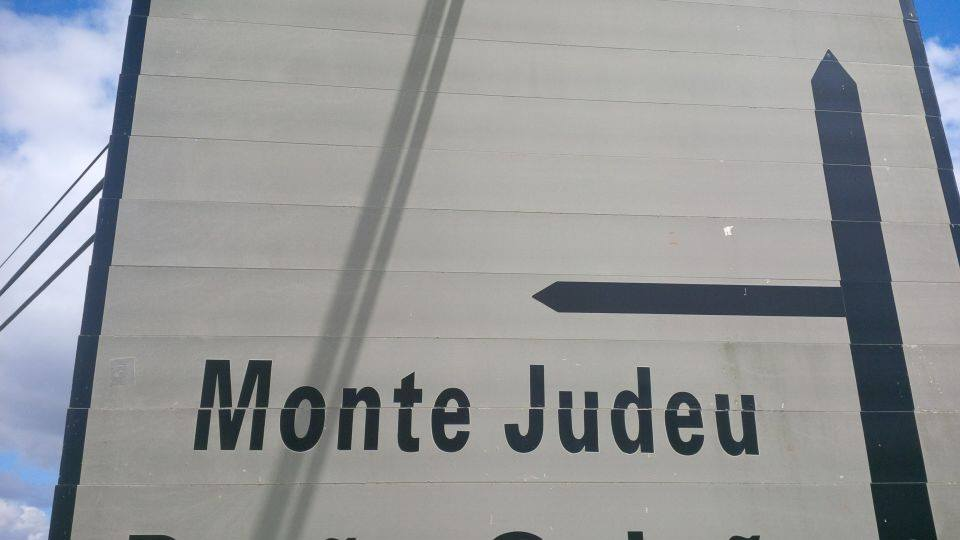
A road sign indicating a small Village in the Algarve called 'Monte Judeu', (in English 'Jewish Mount'), influenced by the Jews who lived in the region.

In 1987 the then President Mário Soares, for the first time in the History of Portugal, asked forgiveness to the Jewish communities of Portuguese origin for Portugal's responsibility in the Inquisition and all the past persecutions of Jews.

At present there are numerous Jewish cultural heritage sites in Portugal, including five synagogues in the country, in Lisbon (Sha'aré Tikvá – Orthodox/ Ohel Yaakov – Conservative), Porto (Mekor Haim), Ponta Delgada in the Azores islands (Porta do Céu – Shaar ha-Shamain) and Belmonte (Bet Eliahu), and several private places where the Jewish community meets. There are a series of kosher products being produced in Portugal including wine.

It is hard to say how many Jews live in Portugal. The Portuguese census estimated a Jewish population of 5,000 individuals in 2001, with a between-census estimate in 2006 of 8,000. The CIA World Factbook cites a smaller number of a thousand Jews, mainly central European Holocaust survivors. But the Crypto-Jews and returned Sephardim represent the remainder.

According to a 2008 study by the American Journal of Human Genetics, 19.8% of the Portuguese population has some degree of Jewish ancestry. The genetic signatures of people in the Iberian Peninsula provide new evidence that the number of Jews forced to convert to Christianity during Catholic rule in the 15th and 16th centuries was much greater than historians believed. Some Portuguese personalities are known Jews or descendants of Jews, most notably Esther Mucznik (leader of the Israelite Community of Lisbon), the photographer Daniel Blaufuks, screen actress Daniela Ruah, former Lisbon Mayor Nuno Krus Abecassis, and the former President of the Republic Jorge Sampaio, whose grandmother was a Moroccan Jew of Portuguese-Jewish origin (though Sampaio does not identify as Jewish, instead considering himself agnostic).

According to a study commission by The Jewish Community of Lisbon in 2026, Portugal has high religious diversity and generally positive perceptions of the local Jewish community. However, the survey also identified gaps in knowledge about relevant topics (for example, 40% of respondents said they are unfamiliar with the term 'Zionism') and pointed to the persistency of some stereotypes, for example "Jews have too much economic power/influence in politics and International media".

=== Citizenship law ===
In April 2013 Portugal passed a law of return, allowing descendants of Sephardic Jews who were expelled in the inquisition to claim Portuguese citizenship provided that they 'belong to a Sephardic community of Portuguese origin with ties to Portugal' without a requirement for residence. The amendment to Portugal's "Law on Nationality" was approved unanimously on 11 April 2013. The law came into effect in March 2015.

=== Antisemitism ===
On 11 October 2023, three days after the October 7 attacks by Hamas on Israel, vandals defaced the synagogue of Porto's Jewish community, leaving pro-Palestinian messages, including "Free Palestine" and "End Israeli apartheid". On 3 February 2024, a housing protest in Porto escalated into an antisemitic demonstration, where participants held signs assigning blame to Jews and Zionists for economic challenges. Some signs called for the 'cleansing the world of Jews'. In March 2024, a local Portuguese Jewish news outlet reported that a member of Lisbon's Jewish community, Esther Mucznik, was berated by a Portuguese poll worker, who remarked that he "didn't like her name" and "the massacres they are carrying out over there." Between 2023-2026, repeated cases of antisemitism occurred in Coimbra and Coimbra University. It reportedly included calls to attack the local "Zionist" community, with university professors hanging posters claiming that Israelis and Zionists should not exist, protestors spreading messages to "fight Jewish supremacy" and hundreds of stickers being spread on campus and around the city intimidating the local Jewish population that Yahya Sinwar will haunt them. A university professor further wrote that "Zionists should carry a certificate to prove they're humans", stickers to "Drink Zionist tears", and that "Jews should not pay for train tickets in Germany". Messages glorifying Nazism were also sent in student groups. In April 2026, the Portuguese Ombudsman ruled that the university broke the Portuguese constitution and violated a student's fundamental rights by threatening him with legal means should he expose the harassment. On 11 November 2025, a testimony from Coimbra was given in the European Parliament.

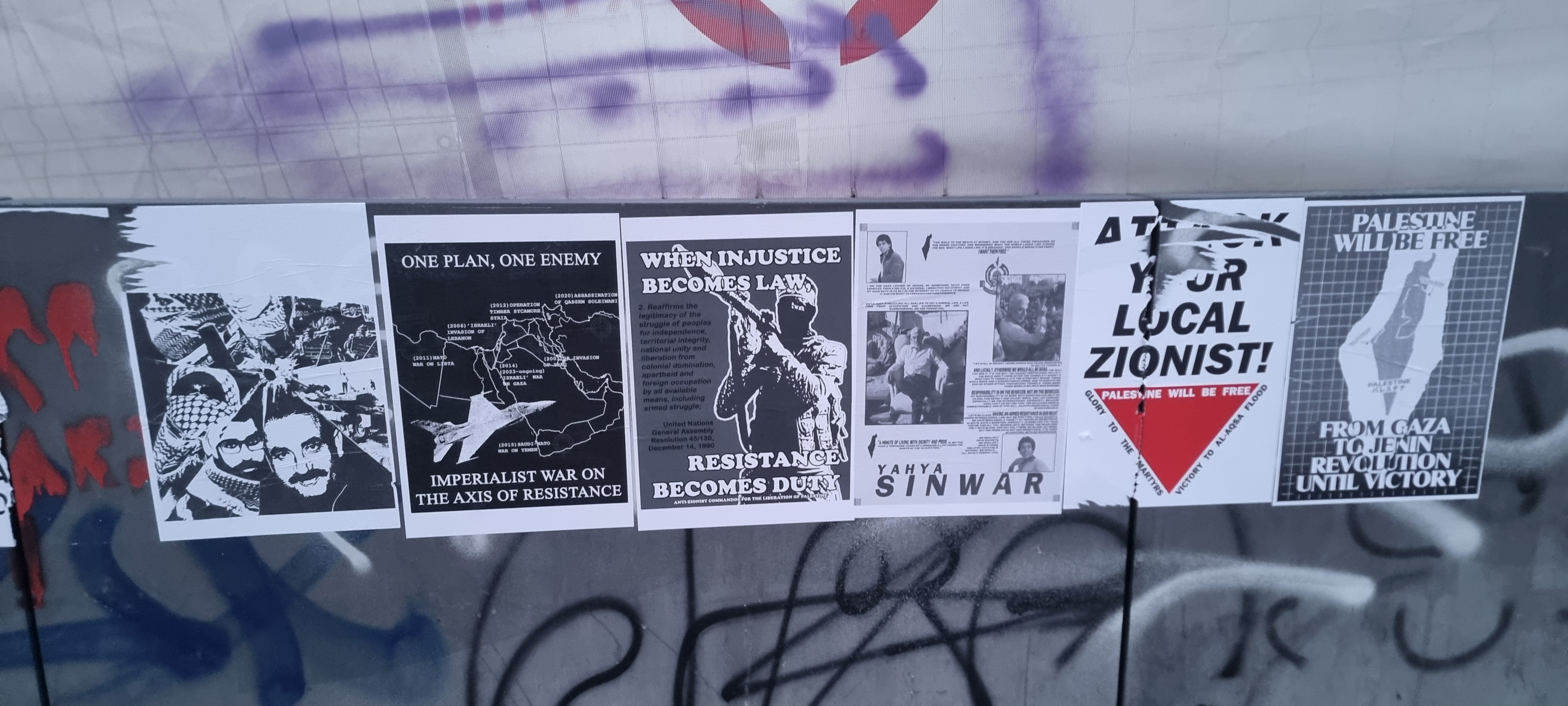
"Attack Your Local Zionist" sign next to Faculty of Letters, University of Coimbra

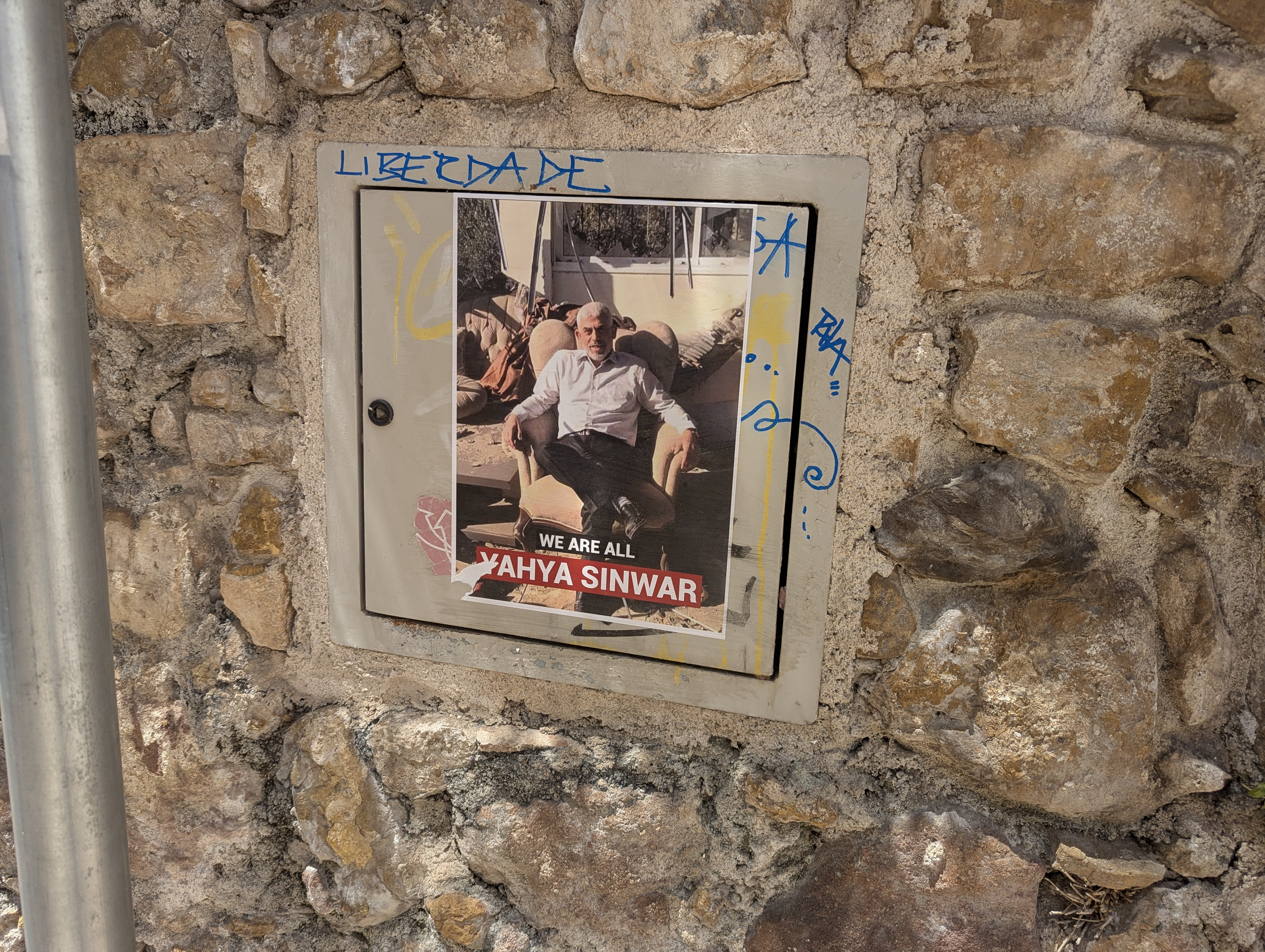
"We are all Yahya Sinwar" on the Faculty of Law, University of Coimbra

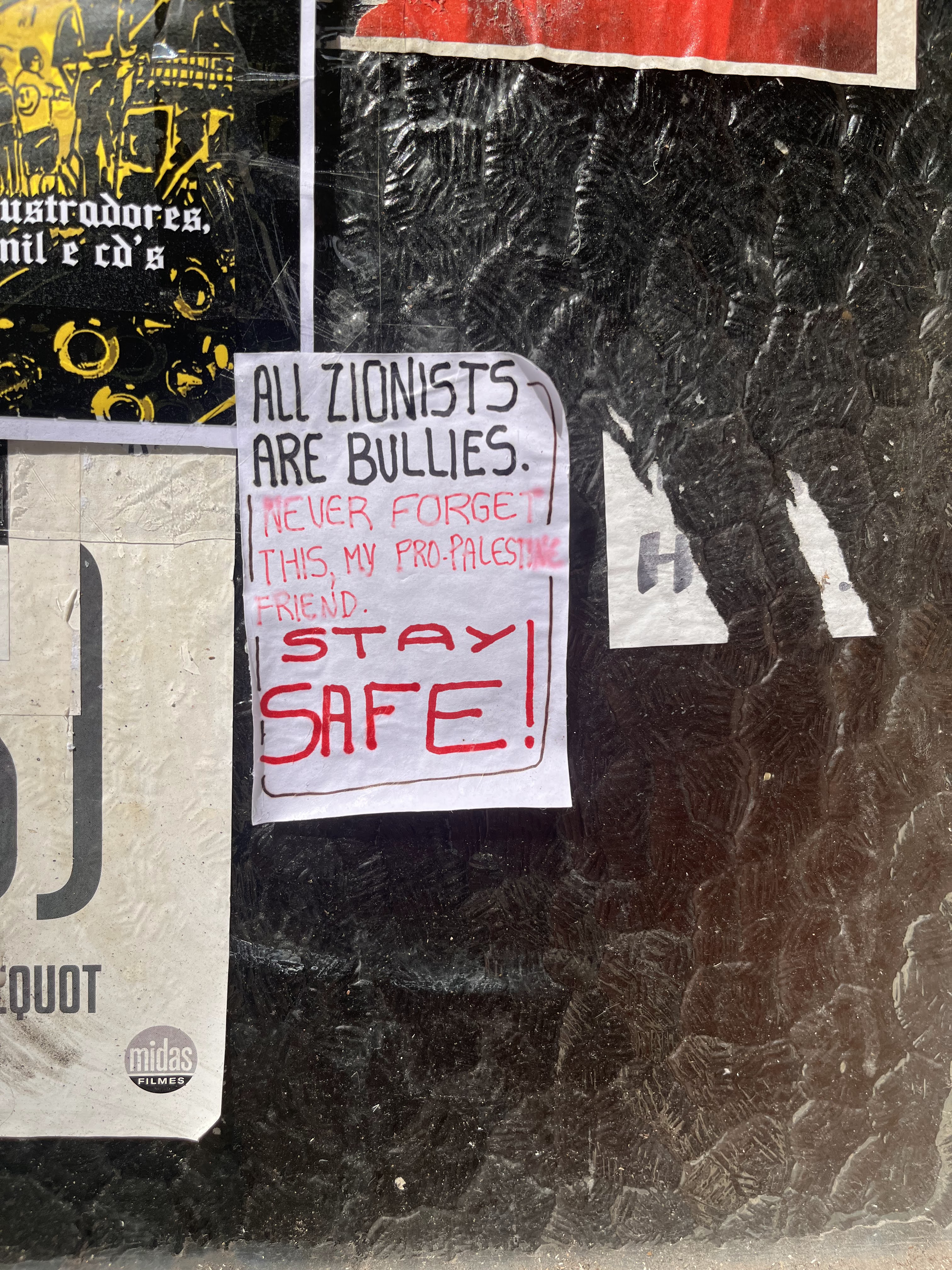
"All Zionists are Bullies, Stay Safe!" next to the Yellow Canteen, University of Coimbra

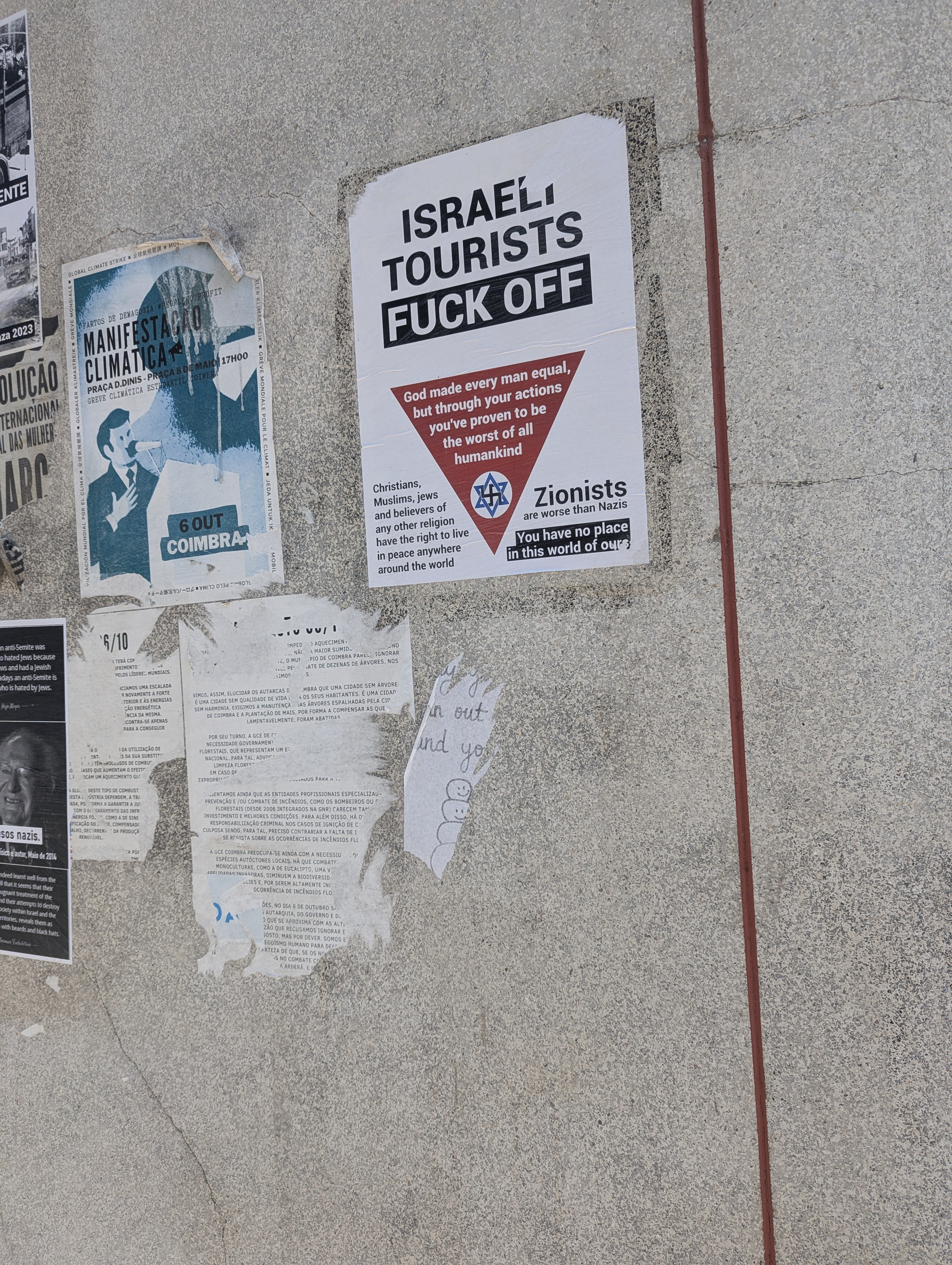
"Israeli Tourist Fuck Off, you're the worst of human kind" by University of Coimbra professor

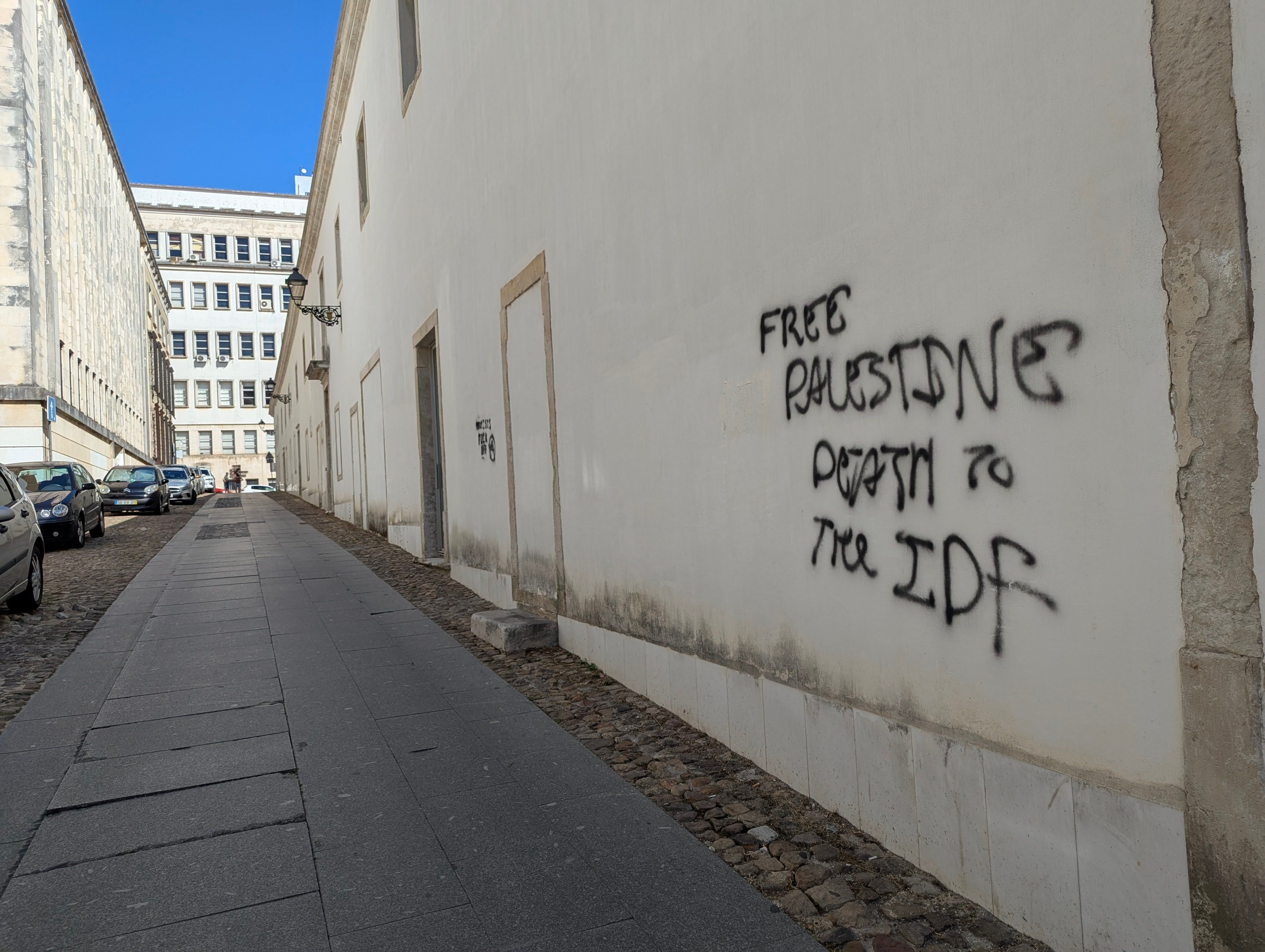
"Death to the IDF" Graffiti on the Faculty of Law, University of Coimbra

== Notable Portuguese Jews ==
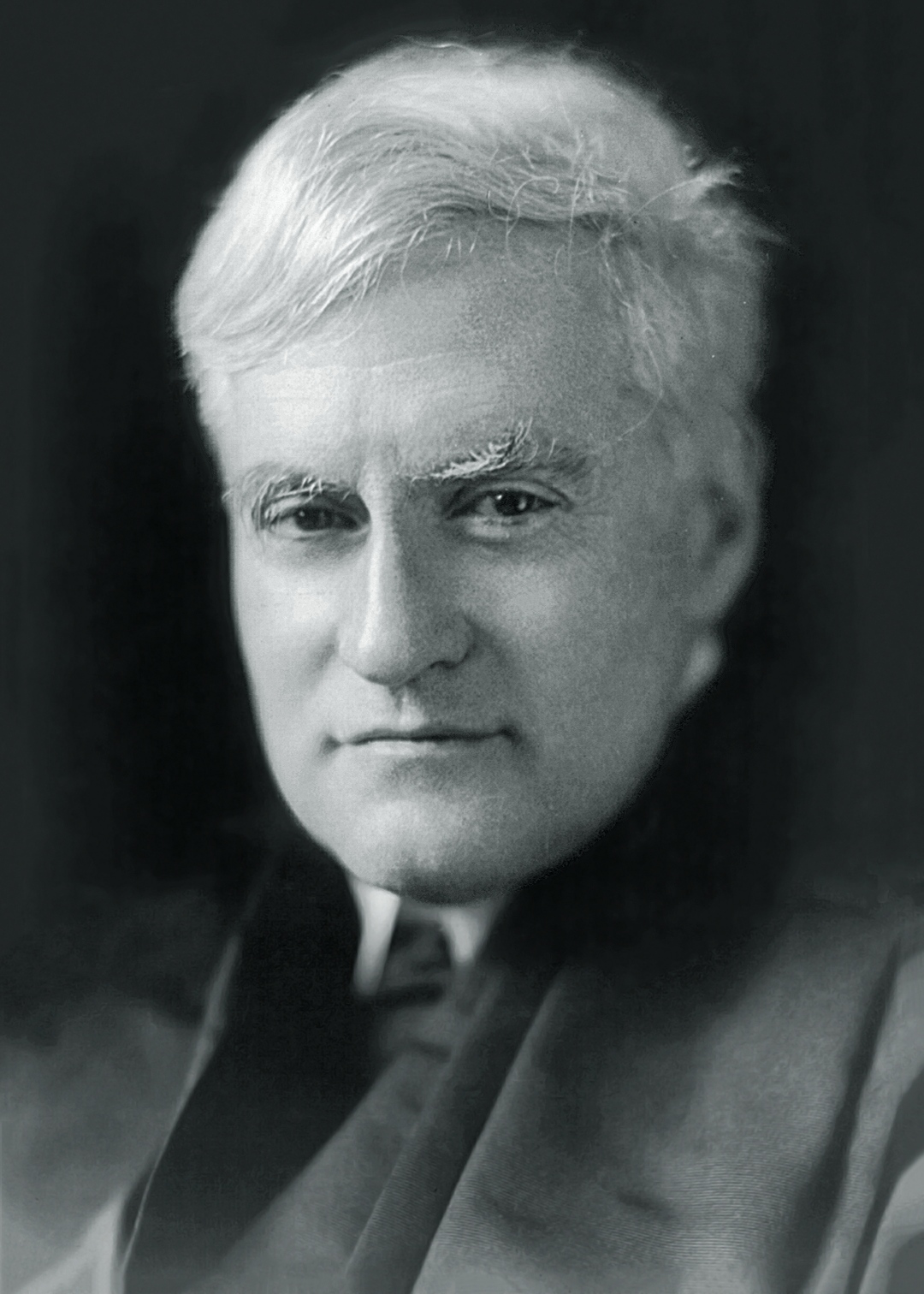
Benjamin N. Cardozo was an American Jurist.

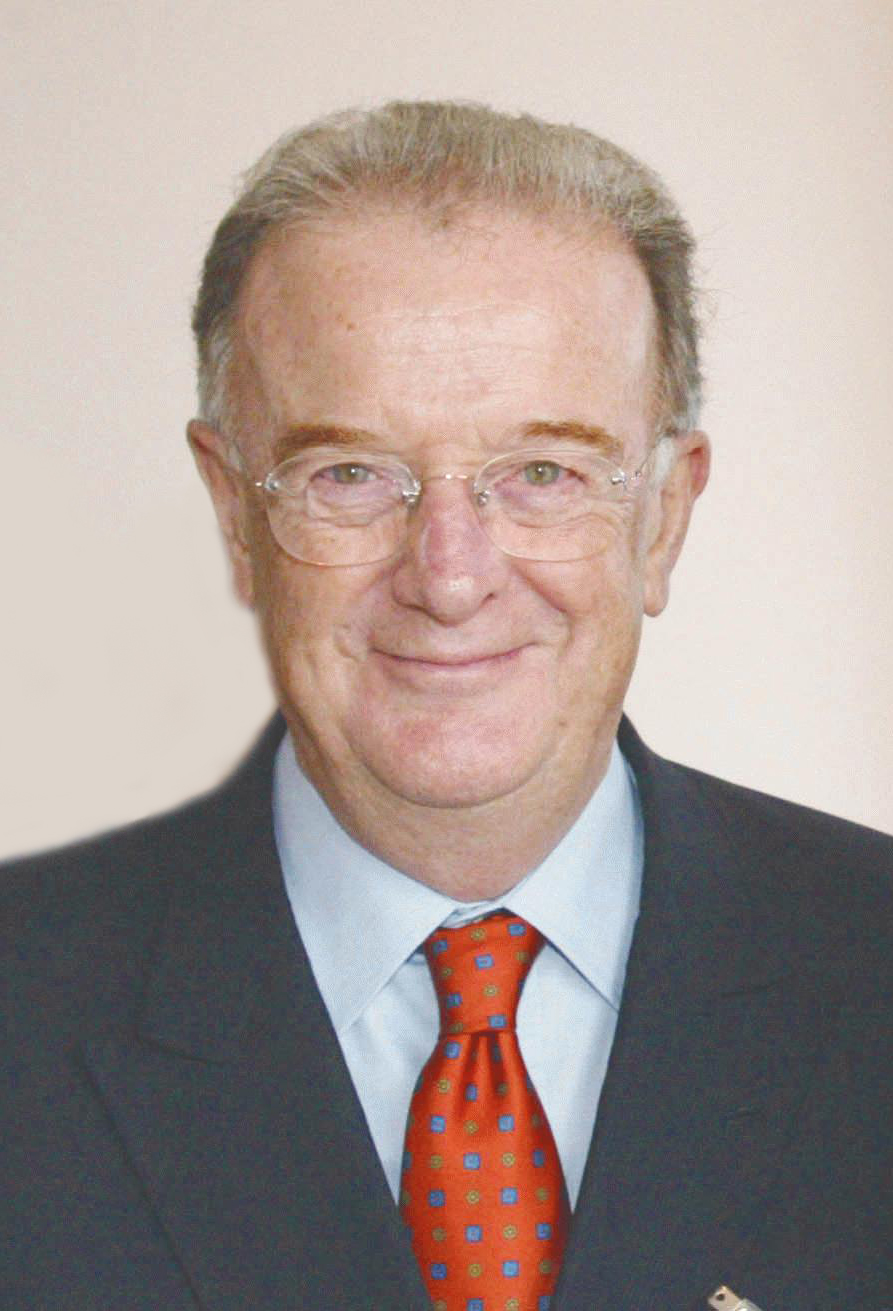
Jorge Sampaio, of Jewish ancestry, was the 18th President of Portugal, from 1996 to 2006.

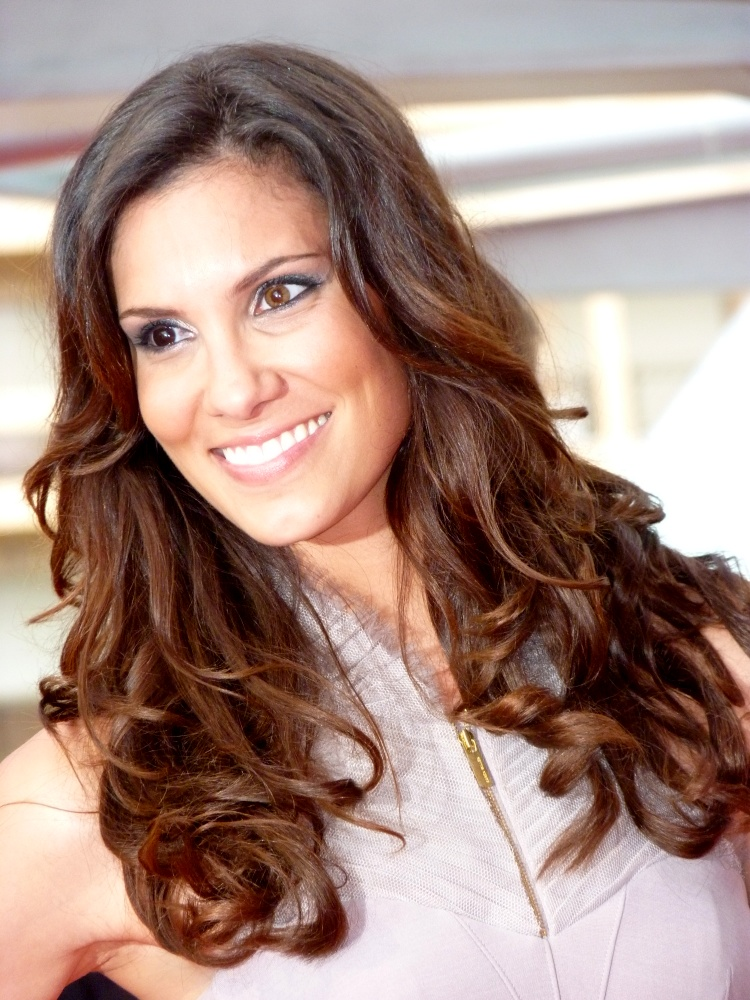
Portuguese-American actress Daniela Ruah.

- Aaron Lopez
- Abraham Caceres
- Abraham Cohen Pimentel, Head Rabbi Portuguese Spanish Synagogue of Amsterdam
- Abraham Israel Pereyra
- Abraham Usque
- Abraham Zacuto
- Abraham Pais
- Alexander Teixeira de Mattos
- Alvaro Pimentel (Merchant, Financier, Spice Trader)
- Antonio Fernandez Carvajal
- António José da Silva
- Antonio de Montesinos
- Baruch Spinoza, expelled from the Amsterdam Portuguese community
- Benjamin N. Cardozo
- Catulle Mendès
- Camille Pissarro
- Daniel Blaufuks
- Daniel Mendoza
- Daniela Ruah
- David Ricardo
- Emma Lazarus
- Ephraim d'Aguilar
- Esther Mucznik (Writer, former leader of the Portuguese Israelite Community - 2002–2016)
- Federigo Enriques
- Francisco Lopes Suasso
- Francisca Nunez de Carabajal
- Garcia de Orta
- Garcia Pimentel (Merchant, Financier, Spice Trader)
- Grace Aguilar
- Henri Castro
- Isaac Abrabanel
- Isaac Cardoso
- Isaac da Costa
- Isaac de Pinto
- Isaac de Sequeira Samuda
- Jacob de Castro Sarmento
- Jacob Rodrigues Pereira
- Joseph Corré
- Gracia Mendes Nasi
- Joseph Nasi
- Joseph Salvador
- Joshua Ruah (Urologist, former leader of the Portuguese Israelite Community - 1979–1991, 1995–1999)
- Jorge Sampaio
- Judah Leon Abravanel
- Judah Touro
- Lewis Goldsmith
- Luis de Carabajal y Cueva
- Luís Vaz Pimentel, a model case of the crime of relapsing into Judaism, Early Jewish Life in Rotterdam from the Portuguese Inquisition Archives
- Malcolm McLaren
- Menasseh Ben Israel
- Moisés Bensabat Amzalak
- Mordecai Manuel Noah
- Moses da Costa
- Pierre Mendès France
- Rehuel Lobatto
- Robert Henriques
- Rodrigo López
- Sam Costa
- Samuel Nunez
- Samuel Sarphati
- Uriel da Costa
- Vic Seixas

== See also ==
- History of the Jews in Madeira
- Spanish and Portuguese Jews
- Israel–Portugal relations
- Portuguese Inquisition
- Goa Inquisition
- Judeo-Portuguese
- History of the Jews in the Netherlands
  - Sephardic Jews in the Netherlands
- History of the Jews in Latin America
- History of the Jews in England
  - History of the Marranos in England
- History of the Jews in Spain
  - Spanish Inquisition
  - Alhambra Decree
- History of the Jews in Jamaica
- Pallache family
- Pallache (surname)
- Exiles Memorial Center
