= 33 Rua do Carmo, Funchal =

Historical building in Maderia, Portugal

33 Rua do Carmo
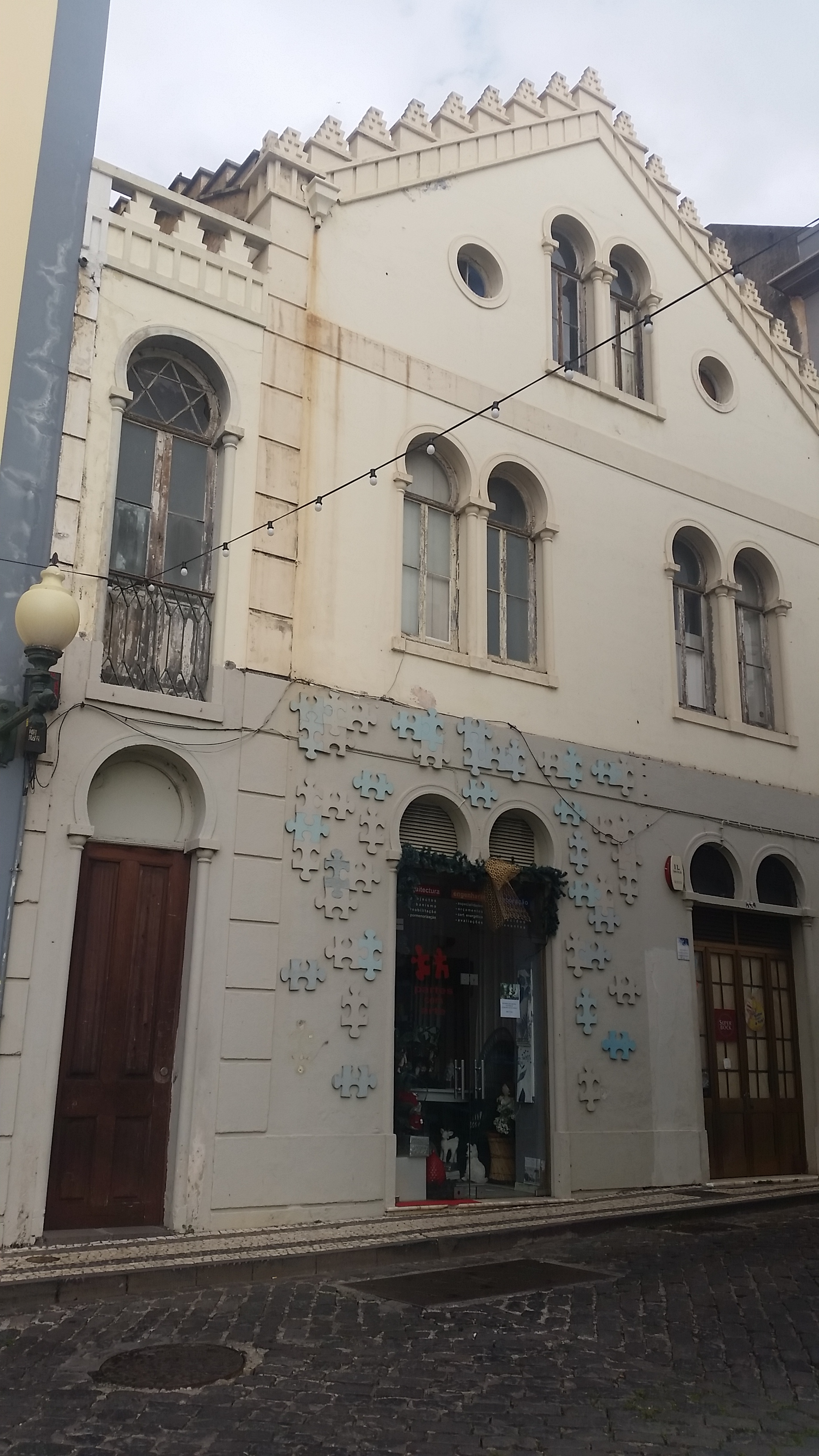
- Building at Rua do Carmo, 33
- Interactive map of the 33 Rua do Carmo area

General information
- Status: Built; Synagogue architecture
- Architectural style: Moorish Revival
- Location: 33 Rua do Carmo, Funchal, Madeira, Portugal
- Coordinates: 32°39′01.7″N 16°54′17.4″W
- Completed: 1836

33 Rua do Carmo is an historical building located at 33 Rua do Carmo, Funchal, Madeira, Portugal. It is likely that the building was built in 1836 in the Moorish Revival style as the Sha'ar Hashamayim Synagogue or Funchal Synagogue, a former Jewish congregation and synagogue.

== History ==
Jews from Morocco arrived in 1819 and set themselves up in the cloth and wine trades. The Abudarham family (originally from Gibraltar) were involved in the Madeira wine industry from the early 1860s onwards. Rabbi David Zaguri became its spiritual leader in 1857. Another period of immigration followed in the 20th century, with the arrival of refugees from the First and Second World Wars. The Jewish community also grew due to the Evacuation of the Gibraltarian civilian population during World War II to Madeira, which included a number of Jews, some of which are buried in the Jewish Cemetery of Funchal.

Tito Benady, a historian on Gibraltar Jewry, noted that when some 200 Jews from Gibraltar were evacuated as non combatants to Funchal, Madeira, at the start of World War II, they found a Jewish cemetery that belonged to the Abudarham family. The same family after whom the Abudarham Synagogue in Gibraltar was named.

The Jewish Cemetery of Funchal located in nearby Rua do Lazareto, was built in 1851, the last burial took place in 1976.

== See also ==
- History of the Jews in Madeira
- History of the Jews in Portugal
- List of synagogues in Portugal
