= Jewish cemetery, Funchal =

Cemetery in Madeira, Portugal

Jewish Cemetery of Funchal
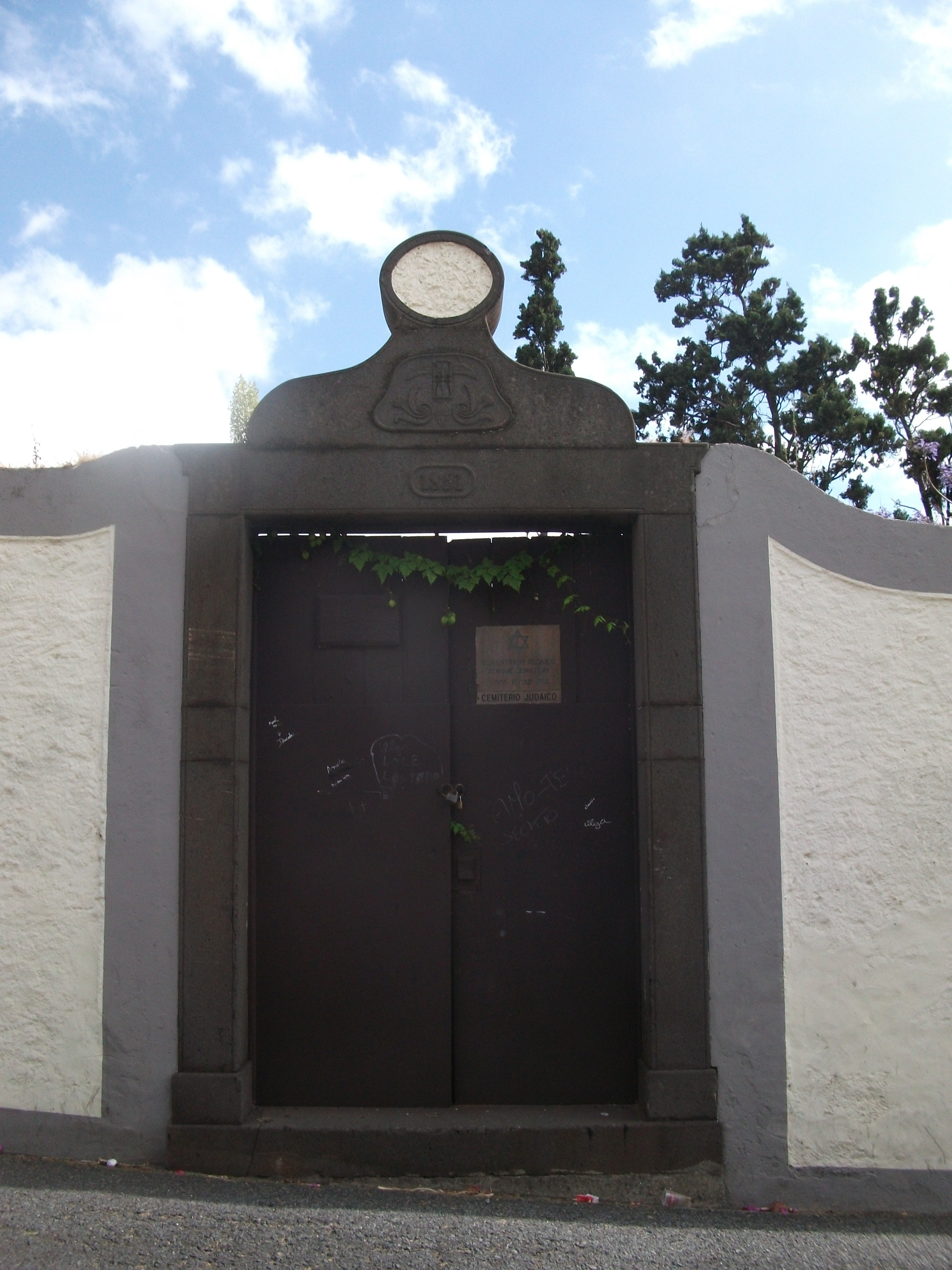
- Entrance to the Jewish Cemetery.
- Interactive map of Jewish Cemetery of Funchal

Details
- Established: 1851
- Location: Santa Maria Maior (Funchal), Funchal, Madeira
- Country: Madeira, Portugal
- Coordinates: 32.647409°N 16.894911°W
- Type: Jewish cemetery
- No. of graves: 38
- Find a Grave: Jewish Cemetery of Funchal

The Jewish Cemetery of Funchal is a Jewish cemetery located in Rua do Lazareto, Funchal, Madeira. Sephardi Jews as well as Ashkenazi Jews are buried here.

== History ==
The cemetery was built in 1851, the last burial took place in 1976.

Jews from Morocco arrived in 1819 and set themselves up in the cloth and wine trades. The Abudarham family were involved in the Madeira wine industry from the early 1860s onwards.

The Jewish community grew due to the Evacuation of the Gibraltarian civilian population during World War II to Madeira, which included a number of Jews, some of which are buried in the Jewish Cemetery.

Tito Benady, a historian on Gibraltar Jewry, noted that when some 200 Jews from Gibraltar were evacuated as non combatants to Funchal, Madeira, at the start of World War II, they found a Jewish cemetery that belonged to the Abudarham family. The same family after whom the Abudarham Synagogue in Gibraltar was named.

== Interments ==
- Salomon Abudarham
- Clara Abudarham
- Reina Abudarham
- Joseph Abudarham
- Simy Abudarham
- Rafael Menahem Abudarham
- Jacob Abudarham
- Fortunato Abudarham
- Messod Alazar
- Mary Athias
- Emma Bach
- Samuel Benady
- Dona Bentata
- Rosa Benyunes
- Abraham Benzecry
- Jeannette Edith Boujou
- Joana Sultan Camara
- David Cohen
- Ester Esnaty
- Haim Esnaty
- Moises Ezagui
- Adolphus Friesner
- Albert Morse Goldberg
- Ester Hassan
- Hermann Horwitz
- Willy Alexander Katz
- Mordejay Labos
- Estrela Labos
- Harry Harry Lorie
- Margit Neugarten
- Abraham Robins
- Menahem Rodriguez Mercado
- Mordechai Rodriguez Mercado
- Pauline Plinette Schnitzer
- Gilbert Schnitzer
- Willy Schnitzer
- Ferdinand Schwartzschild
- Baruj Tobelem

== Gallery ==
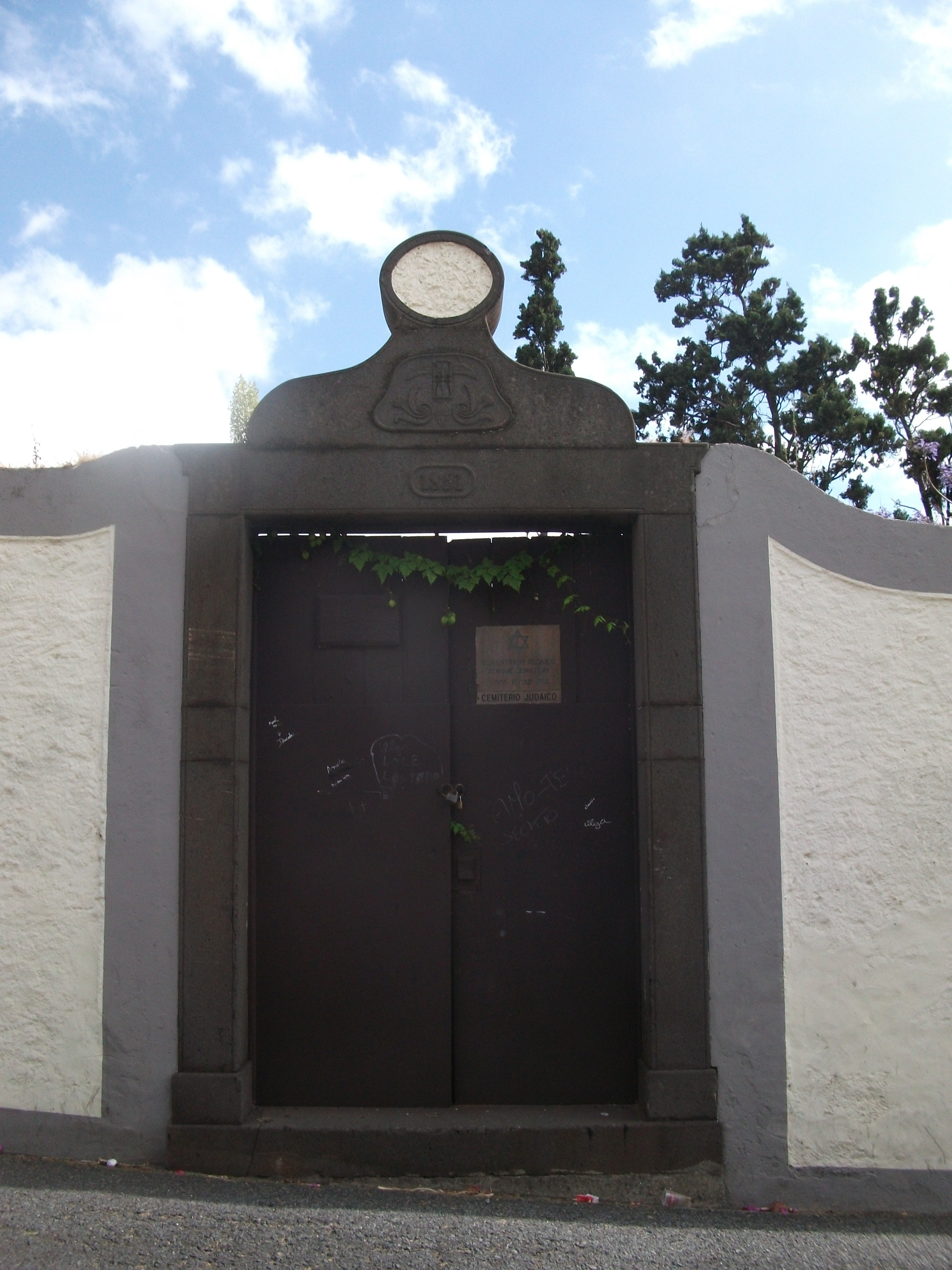

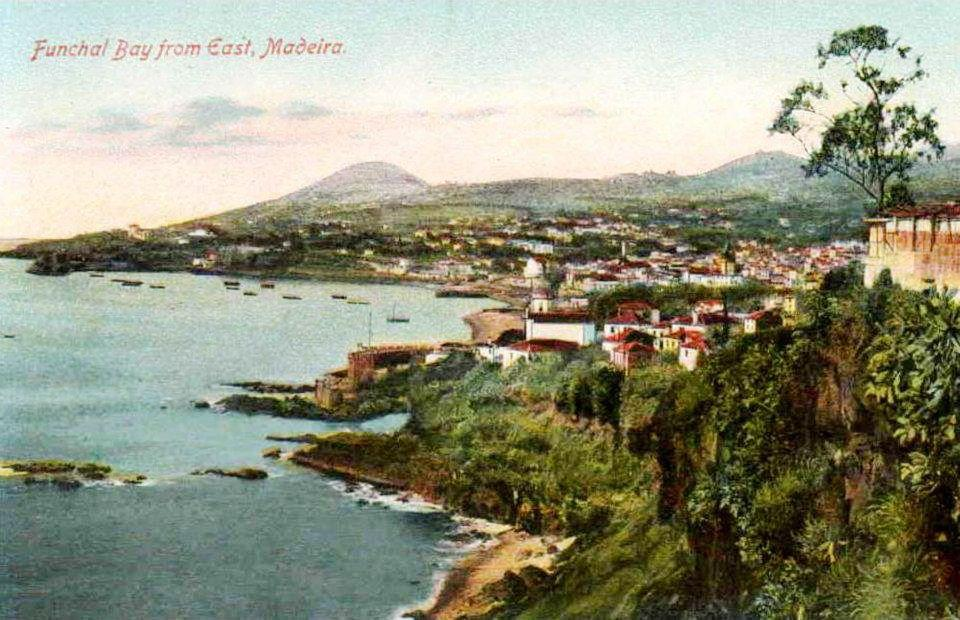

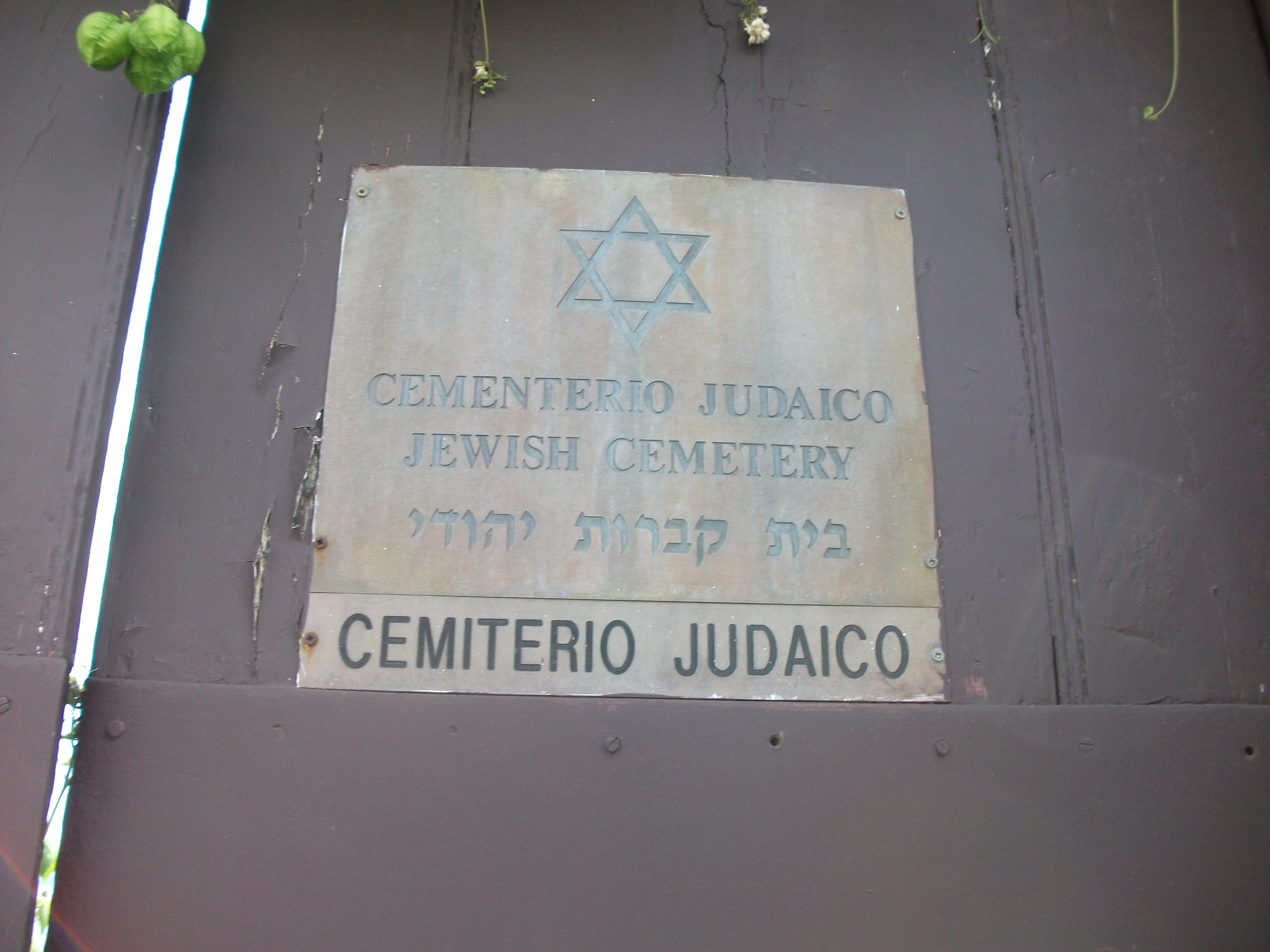

== See also ==
- Synagogue of Funchal
- History of the Jews in Madeira
