= Isaac de Sequeira Samuda =

Isaac de Sequeira Samuda or Isaac de Sequeyra Samuda (born 1681, d. 1729) was a British physician and poet. He was of Portuguese-Jewish descent and was the first member of the Samuda family to settle in Britain.

He was the first Jew to be elected a Fellow of the Royal Society (in 1727). In 1728, he gave an oration at the funeral of Haham David Nieto.

== Biography ==
He was the second son of a Portuguese merchant, Rodrigo de Sequeira, and his wife, Violante Nunes Rosa. He graduated from Coimbra University as a bachelor of medicine in 1702. With his friend Dr Samuel Nunes and two uncles, he was arrested in 1703, tortured and convicted, under duress, of practising Judaism, at an auto da fé in Lisbon on 19 October 1704, which meant the death penalty if convicted again. His maternal grandfather's widow was burnt at the stake in Lisbon in 1706, as was his only sister Maria de Melo Rosa in 1709. He escaped to London with his mother, an uncle and five aunts, to join his elder half- brother, Abraham de Almeida (Gaspar de Almeida de Sequeira). He joined the London Spanish and Portuguese Synagogue in October 1709 and changed his name to Ishac de Sequeira Samuda.

In March 1722, Samuda was admitted as a licentiate by the Royal College of Physicians. In February 1723, he translated a Portuguese report of a whale stranded in the Tagus, for the Royal Society, and was elected a fellow of the Royal Society on 27 June 1723, proposed by its secretary, James Jurin, and supported by Sir Hans Sloane. In April 1724, he delivered a paper to the society giving a detailed description by a Lisbon physician of the yellow fever epidemic in Portugal the previous year. He also provided six reports from Lisbon in Latin, by the astronomer João Baptista Carbone, which gave observations of the eclipses of the satellites of Jupiter made by Portuguese Jesuits in Paris, Lisbon, Rome and Peking. These were intended to be used to calculate longitudes.

Samuda was known as a poet. In 1720, he contributed two poems in Portuguese to Daniel Lopes Laguna's Espejo fiel de la vida. In 1724, he wrote a poem of 1,274 stanzas in Portuguese ottava rima, arranged in thirteen cantos, titled "Viridiadas", after Viriatus, the leader of the Lusitanian people who resisted Roman expansion into Hispania in the first century BC. After Samuda's death, Jacob de Castro Sarmento added another fifty stanzas and presented the manuscript to King João V of Portugal.

David Nieto (1654–1728) was the rabbi of the Bevis Marks Synagogue (the oldest synagogue in the United Kingdom) from 1701. Some of his attributes were immortalized by Samuda wrote an epitaph for his tomb, describing him as a "sublime theologian, a man of profound wisdom, remarkable physician, famous astronomer, sweet poet, fluent rhetorician, jocund author". In a sermon preached at the Nieto's funeral, and later printed, Samuda said that Nieto was an example to emulate and one that he followed. Samuda supported his arguments by drawing on works of the Holy Scriptures and authors of classical Greece and Rome. He quoted Robert Boyle, Hermann Boerhaave, Willem 's Gravesande and Isaac Newton.

Samuda died unmarried on 20 November 1729, in the parish of St Botolph-without-Bishopsgate, London. He was buried in the Portuguese Jews' "Velho" (Old) Cemetery in Mile End Road, Stepney, where Nieto is also buried.
