= History of the Jews in Madeira =

The location of Madeira in relation to North Africa and Europe

The history of the Jews in Madeira spans the entire length of the history of Madeira itself. The history of Madeira begins with the discovery of the islands by Portugal in 1419. Madeira is presently officially the Autonomous Region of Madeira (Região Autónoma da Madeira), and is one of the two autonomous regions of Portugal (along with the Azores). It is an archipelago situated in the north Atlantic Ocean, southwest of Portugal. According to the 2021 census, it had a total population of 250,744. The capital of Madeira is Funchal, which is located on the main island's south coast.

Jews played a leading role in the development of the Madeira archipelago. As well as being merchants, the Jews, or later the New Christians, held a number of prominent professions, including physicists, apothecaries, surgeons, clerks and law graduates. Throughout the different historical periods, many Jews travelled to Madeira for commercial and tourist reasons, among others, and were generally well accepted by the Madeiran community.

== History ==
=== Origins and Documentation ===
Much of what is known about the history and role of Jews in the Madeiran community is based on the analysis of the "Rol dos Judeus," a manuscript held at the Madeira Regional Archive titled Judeus e Cristão Novos na Madeira 1461-1650, transcribed by Valdemar Guerra in 2003. The document, transcribed and authenticated in 1725, once belonged to the Ornelas Vasconcelos family and was likely acquired through Fr. José Francisco de Carvalhal Esmeraldo e Câmara, a genealogist and notary of the Inquisition.

The manuscript is not a direct copy of the original but a 1652 copy, including records of payments made by New Christians under the general pardon of 1605. Despite its incomplete state and inconsistencies, the document is crucial due to the loss of the original. Two other copies exist in the Inquisition Archive in Lisbon, one copied before 1669 by Captain Manuel de Carvalho Valdavesso.

==== The Rol dos Judeus ====
This roll is a list of New Christians who were taxed following the general pardon issued by Pope Clement VIII in August 1604, which required a payment of 1,700,000 cruzados to the Crown. Women married or widowed from "Old Christians" were exempt. The list includes receipts of payments and biographical notes. The collection was ordered by the Inquisition to be gathered in 1768.

=== Economic and Social Contributions ===
According to Valdemar Guerra, Jews played a significant role in Madeira's economy as early as the 15th century, initially as merchants and later as New Christians. They worked as physicians, apothecaries, surgeons, notaries, and lawyers. Evidence of their economic influence appears in 1461, with petitions to ban Jews and Genoese from economic activity—a request denied by the Crown.

In the 16th century, New Christians were prominent in agriculture, grain supply, and trade with Brazil and Viana do Castelo. Some combined commerce with landholding, such as sugar exporter António Pereira. The persecution of Jews in Madeira was politically and economically motivated, aimed at eliminating the wealthy merchant class.

=== Persecution and Inquisition ===
Tensions escalated with the 1496 expulsion edict. Though King Manuel I initially promised integration of converted Jews, distrust prevailed. Anti-New Christian riots in Lisbon in 1506 claimed around 1,900 lives. The Inquisition, permanently established in Portugal in 1536, extended its reach to Madeira.

The first inquisitorial visit to Madeira took place from 1591 to 1592, led by Jerónimo Teixeira Cabral. His visit resulted in 36 prosecutions and extensive reports on 177 individuals, 94 of whom were accused of Judaism. Some were tortured, imprisoned, or executed.

A second visitation in 1618, led by Francisco Cardoso de Tornéo, had more modest results due to increased caution by the community. Only 68 individuals were investigated, with few cases leading to prosecution.

=== Cultural Legacy and Prominent Figures ===
Despite persecution, many New Christians in Madeira achieved high social status. Examples include Gaspar Leite, a jurist and municipal officer; António Lopes da Fonseca, a lawyer; and several physicians and merchants. Some migrated and rose to prominence abroad, such as Diogo Nunes Belmonte (Jacob Israel Belmonte), who became a notable figure in Amsterdam's Jewish community.

=== 19th and 20th Century Revival ===
Jewish presence re-emerged in Madeira in the 19th century. Families like the Abudarham, Adida, and Athias established themselves in commerce and civic life. Jacob Abudarham, in particular, became a key figure in Madeira's wine industry and social organizations.

German and Eastern European Jews arrived during WWII, fleeing persecution. The island also hosted Jewish refugees from Gibraltar. The Jewish cemetery in Funchal, established in 1851, contains graves of individuals from diverse origins.

== Contemporary Presence ==
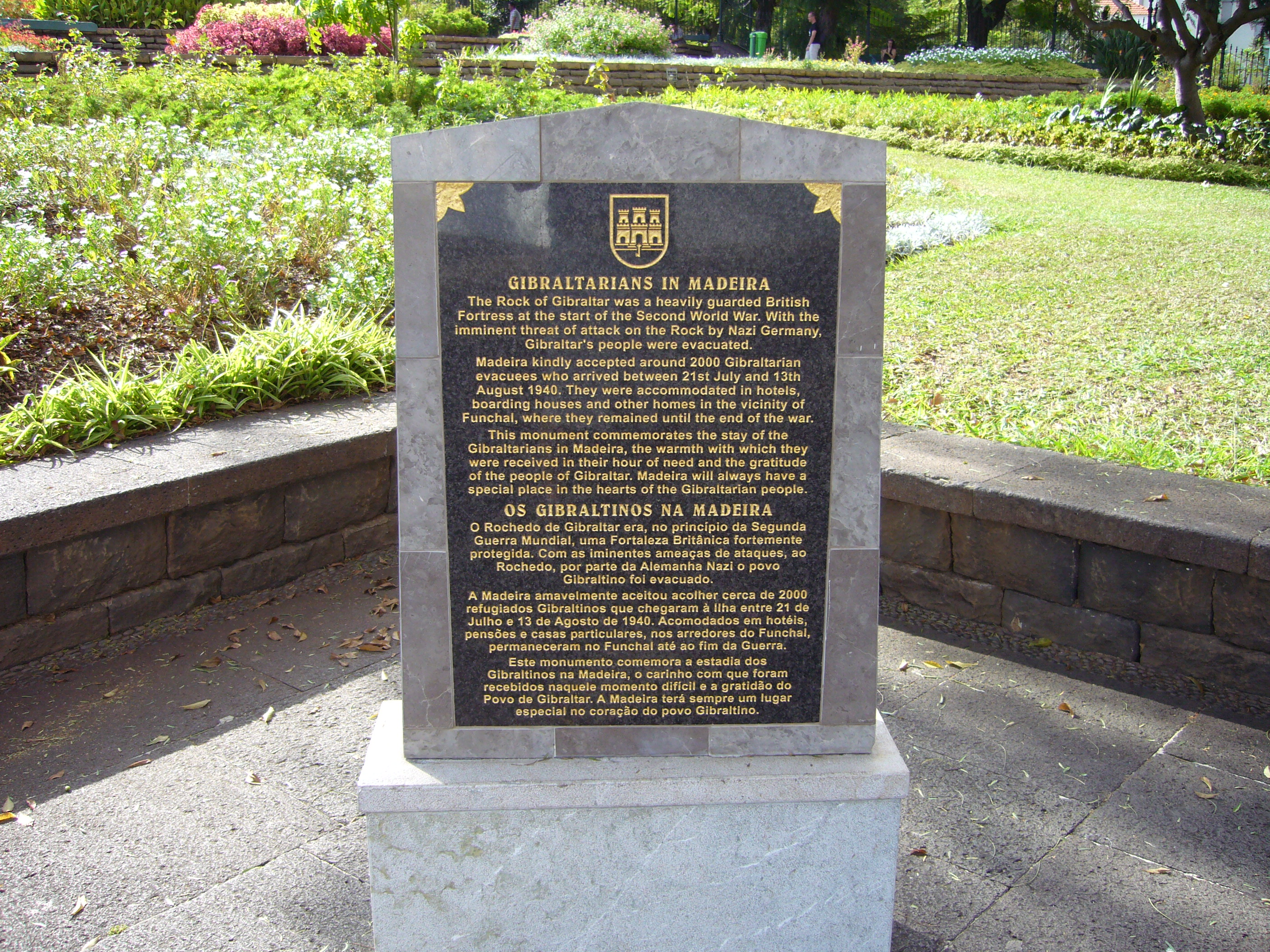
Memorial commemorating Gibraltarian evacuees in Madeira

By the early 21st century, the Jewish population in Madeira had dwindled. The 2011 census recorded only 46 individuals identifying as Jewish. Notable cultural remnants include the Jewish cemetery and a former synagogue at 33 Rua do Carmo.

In 2008, a monument was made in Gibraltar and shipped to Madeira, where it has been erected next to a small chapel at Santa Caterina park, Funchal. The monument is a gift and symbol of everlasting thanks given by the people of Gibraltar to the island of Madeira and its inhabitants.

The city of Funchal and Gibraltar were twinned on 13 May 2009 by their then mayors, the mayor of Funchal Miguel Albuquerque and the mayor of Gibraltar, who had been an evacuee from Gibraltar to Madeira Solomon Levy, respectively. The mayor of Gibraltar then had a meeting with the then president of Madeira Alberto João Jardim.

In 2013, a Passover Seder was held in Madeira sponsored by Shavei Israel and was attended by Bnei Anousim/Crypto-Jews.

== See also ==
- Synagogue of Funchal
- Jewish Cemetery of Funchal
- Lançados
