= Evacuation of the Gibraltarian civilian population during World War II =

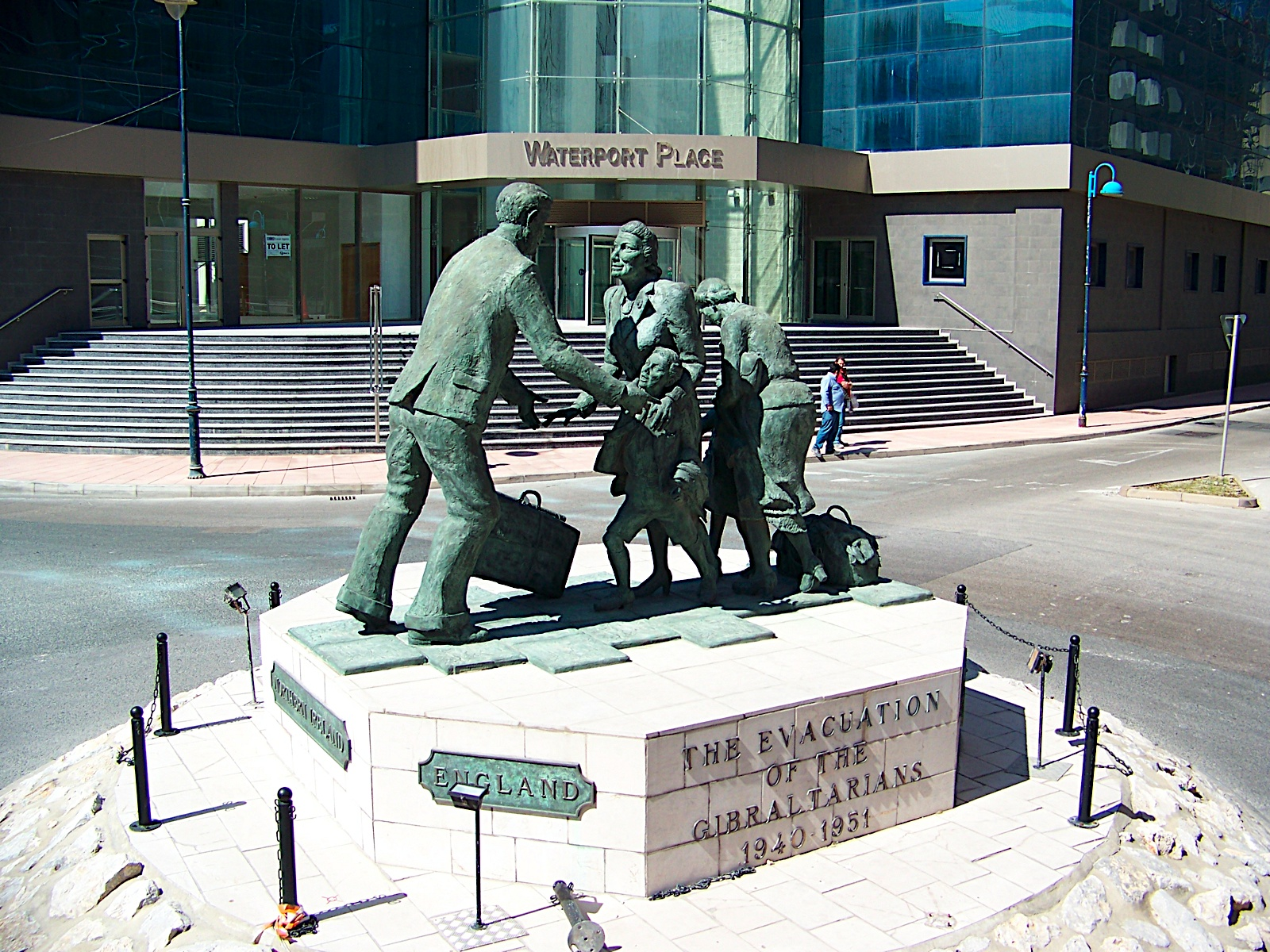
Monument to the evacuation of Gibraltarians on roundabout at N Mole Rd, Gibraltar

During World War II, the British government evacuated the majority of the civilian population of Gibraltar in 1940 in order to reinforce the territory with more military personnel, though civilians with essential jobs were permitted to stay. The civilian evacuees were sent to numerous locations, including London, Madeira and Jamaica; some spent up to a decade away from Gibraltar, but the majority returned in 1943 after the Allied invasion of Sicily. The evacuation reinforced the British national identity of the Gibraltarians via their participation in the Allied war effort.

== Casablanca ==
In early June 1940, about 13,500 evacuees were shipped to Casablanca in French Morocco. From there they were accommodated as follows:- 6,000- Casablanca / 2,500- Rabat / 840- Fez / 590- Mogador / 590- Saffi / 500- Marrakesh / 420- Meknes / 350- Andre Del-Pit / 320- Mazagan / 300- Azemmour. After the capitulation of the French to the Germans in June 1940, the new pro-German French Vichy Government found the presence of Gibraltarian evacuees in Casablanca an embarrassment and sought an opportunity to remove them. That opportunity soon arose when 15 British cargo ships arrived under Convoy Commodore Kenelm Creighton; they were repatriating 15,000 French servicemen who had been evacuated from Dunkirk. Once the rescued servicemen had disembarked, the ships were interned until they agreed to take away all the evacuees. Although Creighton was unable to obtain permission to clean and restock his ships (and contrary to Admiralty orders which forbade the taking on of evacuees), when he saw the mass of civilians pouring through the dockyards, he opened his gangways for boarding. On 3 July 1940, the British Mediterranean Fleet had conducted the attack on Mers-el-Kébir and destroyed a number of French warships, to prevent them being handed over to the Germans. The attacks killed more than a thousand French sailors and led to high tension between the British and the French, which was evident when Gibraltarian families were forced at bayonet point by French troops to board, only with what they could carry, leaving many possessions behind.

Although Creighton was ordered by his superiors in London to return to the United Kingdom, considering that the freighters were in no condition to carry civilians, he defied those orders and set sail for Gibraltar instead, insisting that the freighters be properly refurbished and supplied to accommodate the civilians. After the war, Creighton would be posthumously awarded the Gibraltar Medallion of Honour for his treatment of Gibraltarian civilians.

== Back to Gibraltar ==
When the evacuees arrived at Gibraltar, the Governor, Sir Clive Liddell, would not allow them to land, fearing that once they were back on the Rock, it would be virtually impossible to evacuate them a second time. Crowds gathered in John Mackintosh Square and demanded that the evacuees be allowed to land. After receiving instructions from London, a landing was allowed as long as the evacuees returned when other ships arrived to take them away from The Rock, and by 13 July the re-evacuation back to Gibraltar had been completed.

== London ==
British Conservative politician Oliver Stanley agreed to accept the evacuees in the United Kingdom, but he argued with Gibraltar over the number of people involved. The Governor, he declared, had given the number of evacuees first as 13,000, then as 14,000 and finally as 16,000. He asked for the situation to be clarified, stressing the shortage of accommodation in Britain and insisting that only 13,000 could be accepted, 2,000 of whom were to be sent to the Portuguese island of Madeira in July and August 1940. The situation, replied General Liddell on 19 July, "is that this is a fortress liable to heavy and immediate attack and there should be no civilians here, whereas there are 22,000. The 13,000 was the number sent to Morocco, and more would have been sent had the situation there not altered."

After conditions onboard Creighton's ships were improved, 13,000 Gibraltarian civilians set sail for London. To avoid German U-boats, the convoy took 16 days to circumnavigate the Atlantic. In London the evacuees were placed in the hands of the Ministry of Health, and many were housed in the Kensington area. Concern for them in Gibraltar mounted as the air raids against London intensified, coupled with the arrival of harrowing letters, describing the circumstances in which the evacuees were living.

== Madeira ==
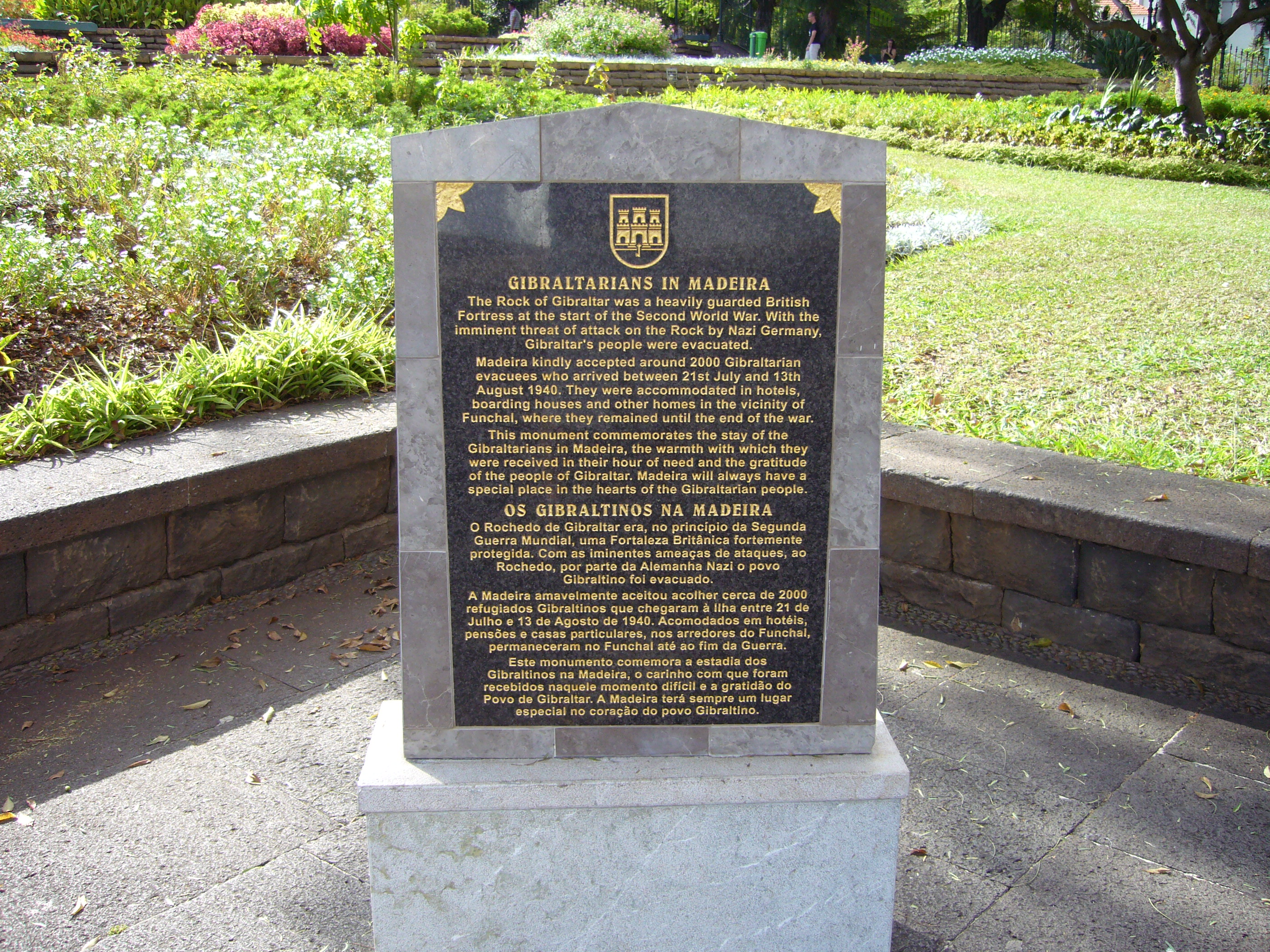
Memorial commemorating Gibraltarian evacuees in Madeira

Tito Benady, a historian on Gibraltar Jews, noted that when some 200 Jews of the 2000 evacuees from Gibraltar were evacuated as non combatants to Funchal, Madeira, at the start of World War II, they found the Jewish Cemetery of Funchal that belonged to the Abudarham family, the same family after whom the Abudarham Synagogue in Gibraltar was named.

On the 28 May 1944 the first repatriation party left Madeira for Gibraltar, and by the end of 1944, only 520 non-priority evacuees remained on the island.

In 2008, a monument was made in Gibraltar and shipped to Madeira, where it has been erected next to a small chapel at Santa Catarina Park, Funchal. The monument is a gift and symbol of ever-lasting thanks given by the people of Gibraltar to the island of Madeira and its inhabitants.

The city of Funchal and Gibraltar were twinned on 13 May 2009 by their then mayors, the Mayor of Funchal Miguel Albuquerque and Solomon Levy, the Mayor of Gibraltar, who himself had been an evacuee from Gibraltar to Madeira. Levy then met with the then President of the Regional Government of Madeira, Alberto João Jardim.

== Jamaica ==
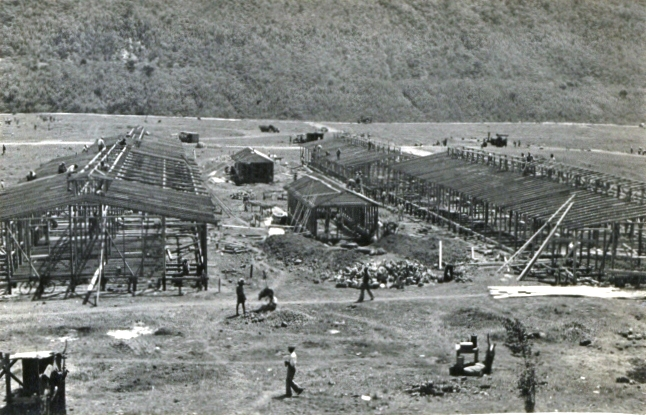
Construction of the buildings in Jamaica

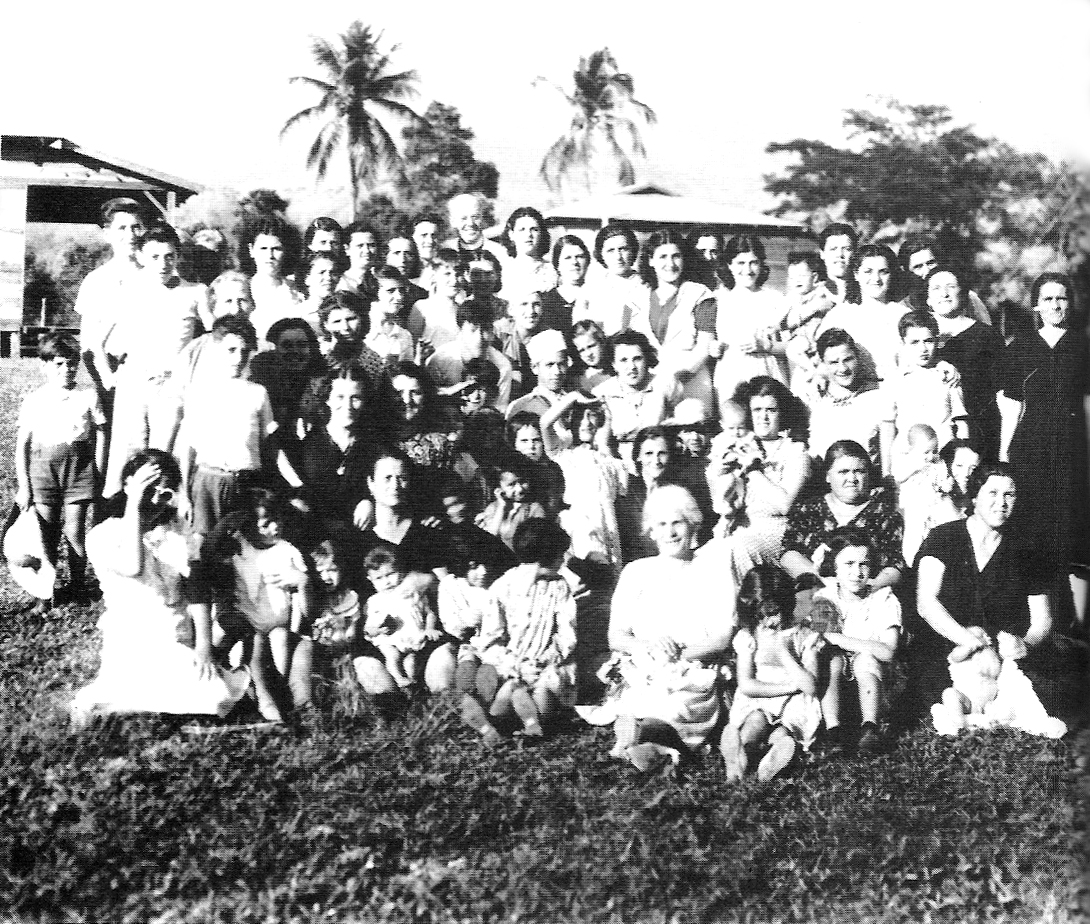
A group of Gibraltarians at the Gibraltar Evacuee Camp in Jamaica during World War II evacuation

In September rumours were already circulating among the evacuees, and in Gibraltar, that the possibility of re-evacuating the Gibraltarians once more was being discussed, this time the destination being Jamaica, in the West Indies. After much contention, it was decided to send a party directly from Gibraltar to the island, and 1,093 evacuees left for Jamaica direct, on 9 October, with more following later on.

Petitions followed and the demands were met, partly for strategic reasons and the lack of available shipping. The situation at the end of 1940, therefore, was that approximately 2,000 evacuees were in Jamaica and a lesser number in Madeira, with the bulk of around 10,000 housed in the London area. The camp that they were in was only designed to take 7,000, but the population of Malta had refused to be moved to Jamaica and the authorities wanted to use the unused capacity as a prisoner of war camp or as barracks for the local militia. Discipline in the camp was quite strict, with residents only being allowed out on the local trams between 8 a.m. and 10 p.m., and local Jamaicans could be fined if they entered the camp. However, the camp enjoyed social events and gardening, but there was heated discussion with Gibraltarians who wished to not eat communally.

== Repatriation ==
The surrender of Italy in September 1943 lifted any possible objections to the return of the evacuees to The Rock. As a result, a Resettlement Board was established in November, and at a meeting of the Board on 8 February 1944 repatriation priorities were finally agreed. On 6 April 1944 the first group of 1,367 repatriates arrived on The Rock directly from the United Kingdom and on 28 May, the first repatriation party left Madeira, and by the end of 1944 only 520 non-priority evacuees remained on the island.

In London, home-comers were making claims on the evacuees' wartime accommodation and 500 Gibraltarians were re-evacuated to Scotland and 3,000 to camps in Northern Ireland. Although the Governor, Lieutenant General Sir Noel Mason-Macfarlane, fought valiantly on behalf of the evacuees and did not accept the lack of accommodation as a sufficient reason for the delays, as late as 1947, there were still 2,000 people in Northern Irish camps. The last of the evacuees did not see The Rock again until 1951.

== Legacy ==
Gibraltarians today remember the evacuation with a statue on one of the main roundabouts by Jill Cowie Sanders. In 2009, Gibraltar Members of Parliament thanked the Church of Our Lady of Dolours in Fulham for the support it had given to evacuees. Over 100 babies were born in Jamaica and the camp that they occupied was converted into part of the University of the West Indies after the war.

== See also ==
- Military history of Gibraltar during World War II
