= History of the Jews in Hong Kong =

Jews in Hong Kong יהדות הונג קונג 香港猶太人

Total population
- about 5,000

Languages
- Hebrew, English, Cantonese, Mandarin

Religion
- Judaism

Related ethnic groups
- Other Jewish groups (Mizrahi, Ashkenazi, Sephardi, etc.)

The history of the Jews in Hong Kong starts when Jews were among the first settlers after Hong Kong became a British colony in 1841. The first Jews arrived in Hong Kong from various parts of the British Empire as merchants and colonial officials. Among the first wave, the Baghdadi Jews stood out especially, including representatives of the influential families of Sassoon and Kadoorie. The construction of the Ohel Leah Synagogue in 1901 marked the beginning of a fully fledged religious life for the city's local Jews.

Hong Kong's Jewish community is able to freely practice most of their cultural and religious traditions, including holding Shabbat meals and celebrating the main Jewish holidays. The city currently has four active synagogues, three schools and a Jewish cemetery.

Jews never constituted a large community in Hong Kong, only numbering a few hundred prior to World War II. Nevertheless, many influential Jews have left their mark on the city. Among them are: Matthew Nathan, the first and only Jewish governor of Hong Kong, who established the Guangzhou–Kowloon through train; the members of the Kadoorie family, who founded the China Light and Power Company and Hongkong and Shanghai Hotels; and the members of the Sassoon family, the benefactors of the Jewish cemetery and the Ohel Leah synagogue. Jewish politician Emanuel Raphael Belilios became chairman of The Hongkong and Shanghai Banking Corporation (HSBC) from 1876 to 1882.

As it is based in a major commercial centre, much of Hong Kong's Jewish community consists of non-permanent residents—largely expatriates from countries with much larger Jewish communities such as Israel, the United States, France, and other nations. As of 2019, Hong Kong has around 5,000 Jewish residents belonging to different denominations of Judaism.

== History ==
=== 19th century ===
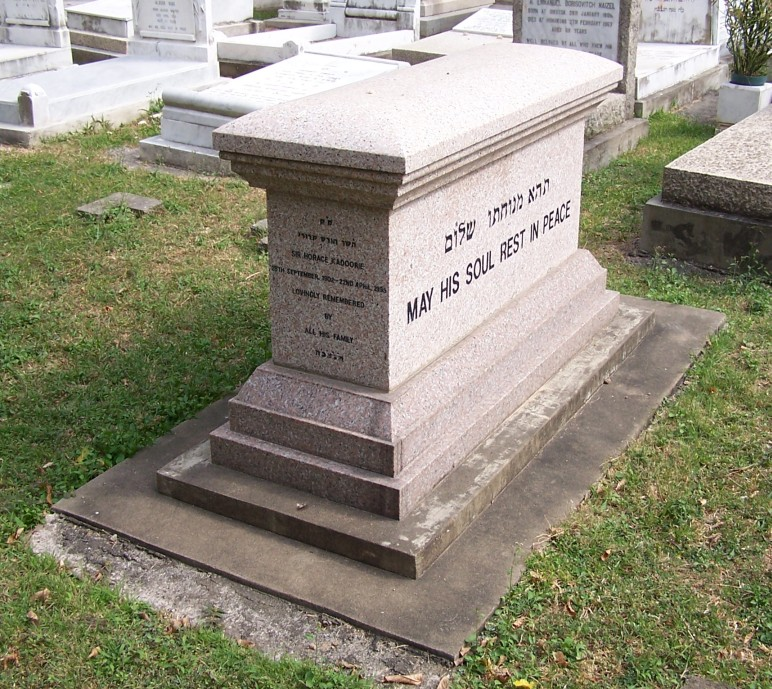
Grave of Horace Kadoorie at the Jewish cemetery in Happy Valley

Jews were one of the first settlers in Hong Kong after it became a British colony in 1841. From 1842, Baghdadi Jews from India, the Middle East, southern China, and a smaller population of Sephardim and Ashkenazim from Britain, Europe, India and other places, began immigrating to Hong Kong. The first settler was the Baghdadi merchant Elias David Sassoon (1820–1880), son of the powerful Mumbai businessman David Sassoon (1792–1864) who opened an office in Canton (Guangzhou) in 1844. This indicated the interest of the trading house David Sassoon, Sons & Co. in the Chinese market. David Sassoon, Sons & Co. opened a branch in Hong Kong in 1857, after moving their operations from Canton to Hong Kong, and E. D. Sassoon & Co. opened its own branch in 1867. The opening of two Sassoon-owned businesses in Hong Kong resulted in increased migration of Baghdadis to Hong Kong. A permanent Jewish community formed in Hong Kong in the 1850s. The social life of the community revolved around the homes of the wealthy Baghdadi families of Sassoon and Kadoorie, another family of Baghdad Jews, whose interests extended far beyond the colony. These families hired mainly Jewish employees in their trading firms, which encouraged the influx of new Baghdadi and Mumbai Jews to Hong Kong.

In 1855, a Jewish cemetery was established in the Happy Valley area, after one of David Sassoon's sons, Reuben Sassoon asked for a 999-year lease from the Hong Kong government. The first synagogue was opened by the Sassoons in 1870 in one of the tenement houses on Hollywood Road, but in 1882 it was replaced by a new synagogue. In 1884, David Sassoon's grandson, Meyer Elias Sassoon, together with the latter's brother, Edward Elias Sassoon and their uncle, Frederick David Sassoon, assumed the role of trustees. The synagogue was named Ohel Leah in honour of Leah Elias Sassoon, Edward and Meyer's mother. In the 1880s, a wave of Ashkenazi Jews who fled the pogroms in Russia and anti-Semitism in Eastern Europe settled in Hong Kong. The already established Baghdadi traders helped Ashkenazim start small businesses in Hong Kong after learning about their struggles from Jewish publications. Wealthy Sephardim distanced themselves from the predominantly poor Ashkenazi. The two communities did not pray together and buried the dead in different parts of the cemetery. Ashkenazim were forced to settle in poor neighbourhoods and boarding houses, work in bars and clubs with a dubious reputation, and some women worked in prostitution.

As the records of the Jewish community were destroyed during World War II, information on the historical numbers of Hong Kong Jews is incomplete. According to an unidentified Jewish encyclopaedia, there were 24 Sephardim and 17 Ashkenazim in the city in 1872. In 1876, there were 36 Sephardim and ten Ashkenazim. The numbers had risen to 49 Sephardim and 22 Ashkenazim by 1881. In 1882, there were about 60 Sephardic Jewish residents in Hong Kong. By 1897, the Jewish community consisted of 52 men, 25 women, 26 girls and 14 boys.

In the second half of the 19th century, Elias David Sassoon was the most influential figure in the Hong Kong Jewish community. He led the operations of the David Sassoon & Co. trading house in China and Japan, controlled the shipments of Indian opium, as well as the company's cargo transportation between Mumbai, Kolkata, Hong Kong, Canton, Shanghai, Nagasaki and Yokohama. With Sassoon's donations, a synagogue and the Sailors' House, one of the first charitable institutions, were built in Hong Kong. In 1865, the Sassoons supported the formation of the Hongkong and Shanghai Banking Corporation, and in the early 1870s David Sassoon & Co. took first place in the supply of opium from Hong Kong to China, overtaking its main competitor, Jardine Matheson & Co. In October 1879, the company suffered a disaster—its coal warehouses in the port of Hong Kong burned down and in March 1880, Elias Sassoon died in Colombo.

Another prominent member of the Sassoon family in Hong Kong was Frederick David Sassoon (1853–1917). Initially, he helped his older brother Elias Sassoon and after his death, he headed the family business in Hong Kong and oversaw affairs throughout the Far East. In addition, in 1878–1879 and 1885–1886, he was chairman of the board of directors of the Hongkong and Shanghai Banking Corporation. From 1884 to 1887 he was a member of the Legislative Council of Hong Kong as a representative of the justice of the peace. After moving to the UK, he was chairman of David Sassoon & Co. in London and director of the Imperial Bank of Persia. In addition to Frederick, his elder brother Arthur (Abraham) David Sassoon (1840–1912) was also on the board of directors of the Hongkong and Shanghai Banking Corporation.

Among the wealthy members of the Jewish community in Hong Kong, there was also the Dutch Jew Charles Henri Bosman (1839–1892). He was the head of the Bosman and Co. trading house, co-owner of the Hongkong Hotel, and a director of the Hong Kong and Whampoa Dock, which was founded in 1863 by Scottish businessman Thomas Sutherland. By 1869, Charles Bosman was the Dutch consul in Hong Kong and ran his own marine insurance company, one of whose important clients was the Jardine Matheson & Co. Later, Charles Bosman moved to Great Britain and received British citizenship in either 1888 or 1889. He died in London in 1892. By the end of the 19th century, one of the richest people in Hong Kong was the son of Charles Bosman, Robert Hotung Bosman, who was able to compete with the owners of the leading British trading houses in the colony due to his wealth and influence.

Along with the Sassoons and the Bosmans, Emanuel Raphael Belilios (1837–1905) also stood out among the Jews of Hong Kong. Arriving in Hong Kong in 1862, he became an exchange broker in the colony. He quickly became wealthy after opening his firm E.R. Belilios which traded opium between India and China. He had become a significant landowner by the 1880s. He headed the Hongkong Hotel Company and was also the chairman of the board of directors of the Hongkong and Shanghai Banking Corporation, and a member of the Hong Kong Legislative Council. His increasing prestige among the Jewish community and his goal to be the new head of the Jewish community by replacing Sassoons, who at the time were considered the leaders of Hong Kong's Sephardic community, led to a dispute with the Sassoons. The dispute started with Belilios wanting to build a new synagogue in the city. He then bought a piece of land on Kennedy Road. The other members of the Sephardic community tried to buy back the land but Belilios refused to give it up. In 1897, David Aaron Gubbay (Sassoons' family friend), Abraham Jacob Raymond (manager of E.D. Sassoon & Co.) and Abraham Jacob David (partner in E.D. Sassoon & Co.) took Belilios to court, arguing that Belilios had bought the land on behalf of the Jewish community and thus was obligated to return it. On 12 February 1898, Belilios won the case and the court asserted that Belilios had not bought the land on behalf of the Jewish community. However, the Jews of Hong Kong were still against Belilios' plan and it became clear that the community was loyal to the Sassoons. Soon after this, Belilios started to spend more time in London, possibly because of the failure of his plan.

=== First half of the 20th century ===
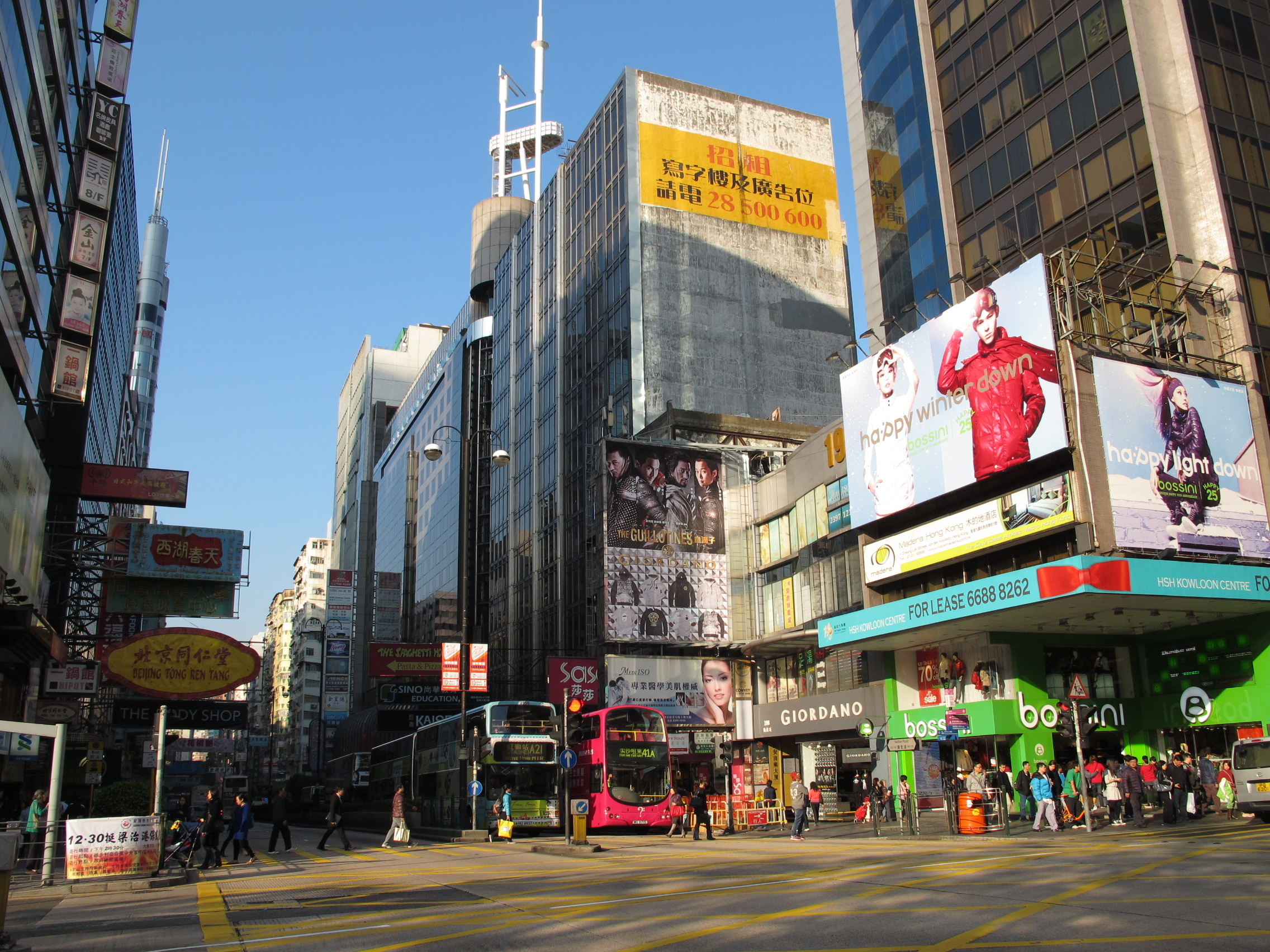
Jordan section of Nathan Road, named after the Jewish Hong Kong Governor Matthew Nathan

By the beginning of the 20th century, 165 Jews officially lived in Hong Kong. The heyday of the Jewish community of Hong Kong came under the rule of Governor Matthew Nathan (1904–1907)—the only Jewish governor of the colony. Under his governance, the Jewish cemetery was expanded and the construction of the railway between Kowloon and Canton began. The main street of Kowloon was named Nathan Road in his honour. From the early 1920s to the mid-1930s, there was an outflow of Jewish businessmen to the rapidly developing Shanghai and the number of the Jewish community dropped below 100 people. As before, the Sephardim predominated, but due to the influx of refugees from Eastern Europe, the balance began to change in favour of the Ashkenazim.

In the first half of the 20th century, the brothers Jacob Elias Sassoon and Edward Elias Sassoon (1853–1924), along with their relative Edward Shellim (1869–1928), were the most influential figures in the Jewish community of Hong Kong. Shellim, who was a nephew of Elias David Sassoon, started to work as a manager in the Hong Kong branch of David Sassoon & Co., and later became a chairman of the Hongkong and Shanghai Banking Corporation from 1912 to 1913, as well as the director of the Hong Kong Tramways, Hongkong Land and Hong Kong and Kowloon Wharf and Godown Company. He was also a member of advisory committees of China Sugar Companies Refining, Hong Kong Fire Insurance and Canton Insurance Society. In addition to his commercial activities, Shellim was also involved in public affairs as a justice of the peace, a member of the Legislative Council of Hong Kong from 1913 to 1918, as well as a member of the committees of the Hong Kong General Chamber of Commerce, House of Sailors, head of the financial committee of Alice Ho Miu Ling Nethersole Hospital, and the council of the Ohel Leah Synagogue and Hong Kong University Council. Shellim died on 8 December 1928.

The Kadoorie family successfully competed with the Sassoons. In the early twentieth century, a member of the Kadoorie family, Eleazer Silas (1867–1944) was becoming the new leader of Hong Kong's Jewish community as the Sassoons' focus shifted to Shanghai and Britain. He changed his name to Eleazer Silas Kelly and later Sir Elly in Hong Kong to appease the British elite. At the height of his power, he, along with his brother Ellis (1865–1922) controlled stakes in the China Light and Power Company, the Hongkong and Shanghai Banking Corporation, the Star Ferry, textile mills and rubber plantations, and owned extensive real estate and the Hongkong Hotel Company (today known as Hongkong and Shanghai Hotels). In 1928, Elly Kadoorie opened the most prestigious hotel in the colony near Kowloon Station—the six-story Peninsula Hotel. In 1905, he established a social club near the Ohel Leah synagogue. The club allowed the Sephardim and Ashkenazim to meet in a more inclusive space.

From 1937, Jewish refugees (mostly wealthy Jews with British or American passports) from Shanghai, Tianjin and Harbin, fled the hardships of the Japanese occupation and began to flock to Hong Kong, along with some Jews from Europe who fled Nazism. The composition of the newcomers was quite diverse; among this wave of refugees, there were Baghdadi, Russian, German, Austrian, Polish and Czech Jews. The Hong Kong Society of Jewish Refugees was created to accommodate them.

==== Japanese occupation ====
Before the Japanese attack on Pearl Harbor, there were still some contacts between the Shanghai Ghetto and Hong Kong. But after the attack, the wealthy Baghdadi Jews of Shanghai—many of whom had British citizenship—were interned. In June 1940, the British authorities abruptly announced the evacuation of women and children off the island to Australia due to the threat of a Japanese invasion. The evacuations quickly turned into a highly contentious matter and became riddled with racial discrimination. When the women of Hong Kong wanted to leave, they learned only people with a "pure" British ancestry, as the Australian government requested, were allowed to leave. Nevertheless, some non-European women managed to board the evacuation ships. However, they were again separated at a stopover in Manila and sent back to Hong Kong. According to Jewish eyewitnesses of the time: "The ships were leaving half empty and government maintained its silence".

On 7 December 1941, the Japanese army invaded Hong Kong and the city surrendered on 25 December. Allied nationals, including many members of the Jewish community, were sent to the civilian prisoner-of-war camps in Stanley (where, for example, Morris Abraham Cohen and Elly Kadoorie's families were imprisoned), while those who fought with the military in defence of Hong Kong, were imprisoned in the military camp at Sham Shui Po. Inside the camps, some wealthy Jews managed to get certain camp privileges. For example, one wealthy Jewish family in Stanley had one of the best rooms in the camp and later managed to get repatriated to Shanghai. The camps were also full of negative Jewish stereotypes. The Jews were often associated with dishonest gains and the black market.

During the Japanese occupation, the Ohel Leah Synagogue was used as a warehouse and the Jewish Club was looted. After the war, some of the local Jews who had managed to escape Hong Kong, returned; in 1949, the previously destroyed Jewish Club was restored. Another wave of Jewish refugees followed from Europe through the ports of Mumbai, Singapore and Hong Kong to Shanghai, where, after the Japanese occupation, visas were still not required for Europeans—in contrast to the Jewish refugees who the British colonial authorities did not allow to disembark in their ports.

=== Second half of the 20th century ===
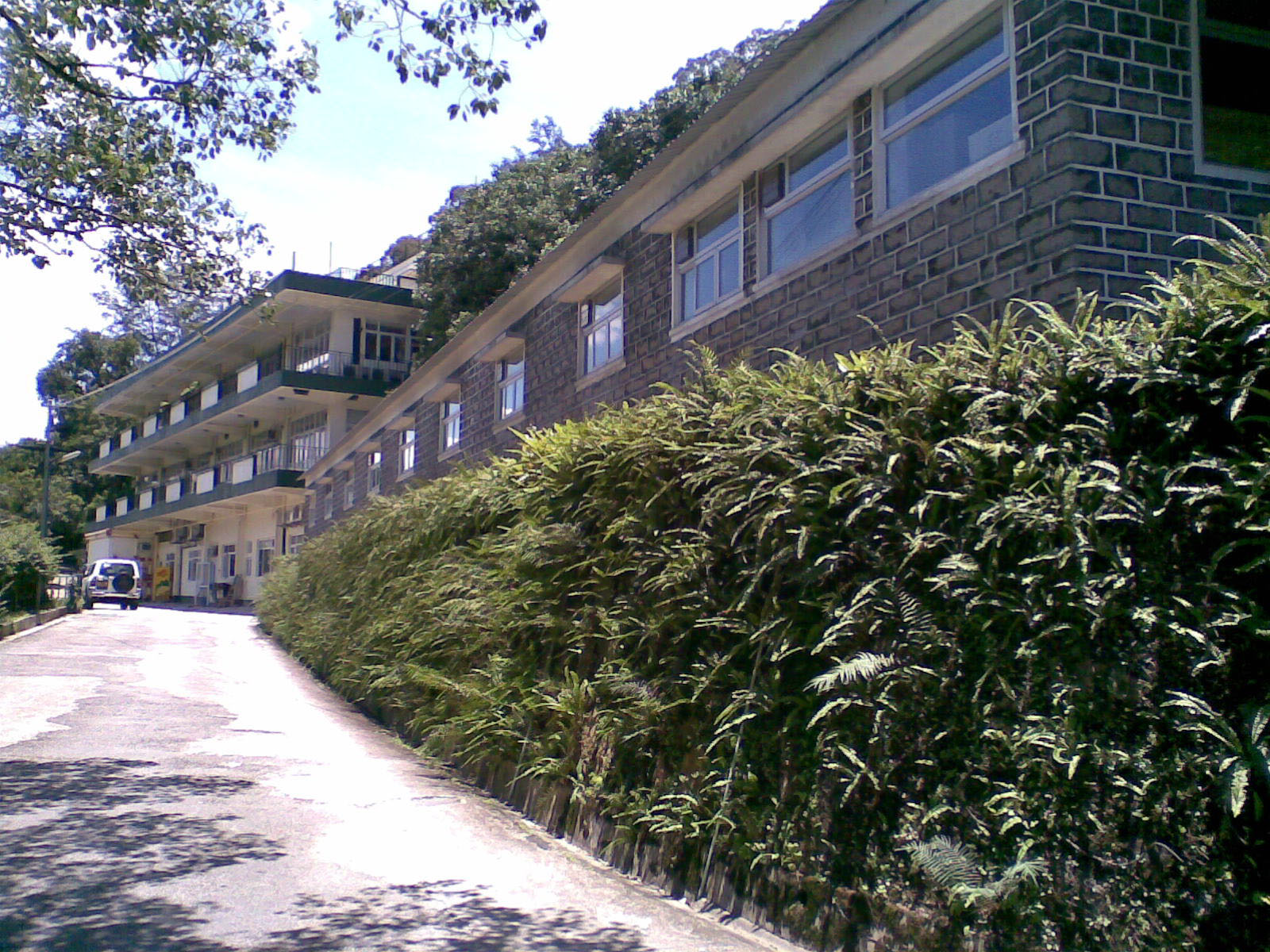
Kadoorie Farm and Botanic Garden

In the second half of the 20th century, the most prominent representatives of the Jewish community in Hong Kong were Lawrence Kadoorie (1899–1993) and Horace Kadoorie (1902–1995)—the sons of Elly Kadoorie, partners in the family business and well-known philanthropists. After the war, they revived the China Light and Power Company and The Peninsula Hotel and formed Hongkong and Shanghai Hotels. In addition, the brothers became shareholders of textile enterprises, the Star Ferry company and the Peak Tram cable car leading to Victoria Peak. Lawrence also served on the board of directors of the Hongkong and Shanghai Banking Corporation.

Lawrence Kadoorie was a member of the Legislative and Executive Councils of Hong Kong in the 1950s. In 1962, Lawrence and Horace Kadoorie received the Ramon Magsaysay Award (the Asian analogue of the Nobel Prize). Lawrence Kadoorie received the Most Excellent Order of the British Empire in 1970, was made a Knight Bachelor in 1974, was made a baron for his philanthropy in 1981, became a life peer, and was the first person born in Hong Kong to become a member of the UK House of Lords.

In 1951, Lawrence and Horace Kadoorie founded the Kadoorie Agricultural Aid Association to provide training and loans for local farmers. The association became a successful business model and revitalized the New Territories. Five years later, they established an experimental farm and botanical garden, which eventually developed into one of the world's top 20 botanical gardens.

There were 250 Jews in Hong Kong (half Sephardi, half Ashkenazi) in 1954. The number dropped to 230 in 1959 and further to 200 in 1968 (130 Ashkenazi and 70 Sephardi). In 1974, according to the combined lists of the Ohel Leah Synagogue and the Jewish Club, there were about 450 local Jews living in Hong Kong.

Five Torah scrolls, belonging to the ancient Jewish community of Kaifeng were discovered in the so-called "Thieves' Market" of Cat Street (Lascar Row quarter in the Sheung Wan district) in 1974. Today these scrolls are kept in the Ohel Leah Synagogue. In 1984, the Jewish Historical Society of Hong Kong was founded in the Jewish Club to study the history of the Jews in China. A year later, the Israeli Consul General in Hong Kong and Macau was officially appointed (Israel formally established diplomatic relations with China in 1992).

In the late 1980s, American Rabbi Samuel Joseph arrived in Hong Kong and became the first head of the United Jewish Congregation of Hong Kong. At that time, the community did not yet have its own premises, and meetings were held at the American Club or the China Fleet Club of the British garrison. In 1989, of the members of Ohel Leah and the Jewish Club, 39% were Americans, 27% were British (including residents of the colony), and 17% were Israelis. In 1991, the Carmel Jewish Day School was founded, located in the east wing of the former British military hospital in the Mid-Levels. In the first half of the 1990s, 1.5 thousand Jews lived in Hong Kong, of which about 1,000 participated in the life of the community. According to the Museum of the Jewish People, on the eve of the transfer of Hong Kong to the People's Republic of China (1997), around 2,500 Jews lived in the colony, two-thirds of whom were Americans and Israelis; while according to the American Jewish Year Book, somewhere between 3,000 and 6,000 Jews lived in Hong Kong in 1997. The composition of the Jewish community had also shifted from the predominantly Baghdadi and Western European Jewish population to a predominantly American, British and Israeli mix. According to the 1989 Hong Kong community profile survey, only three per cent of Hong Kong Jews had Cantonese as their primary or native language (mostly Chinese women who converted to Judaism for marriage), while only seven per cent had learned Cantonese as a second language. Nine per cent of the survey respondents spoke Mandarin as a second language.

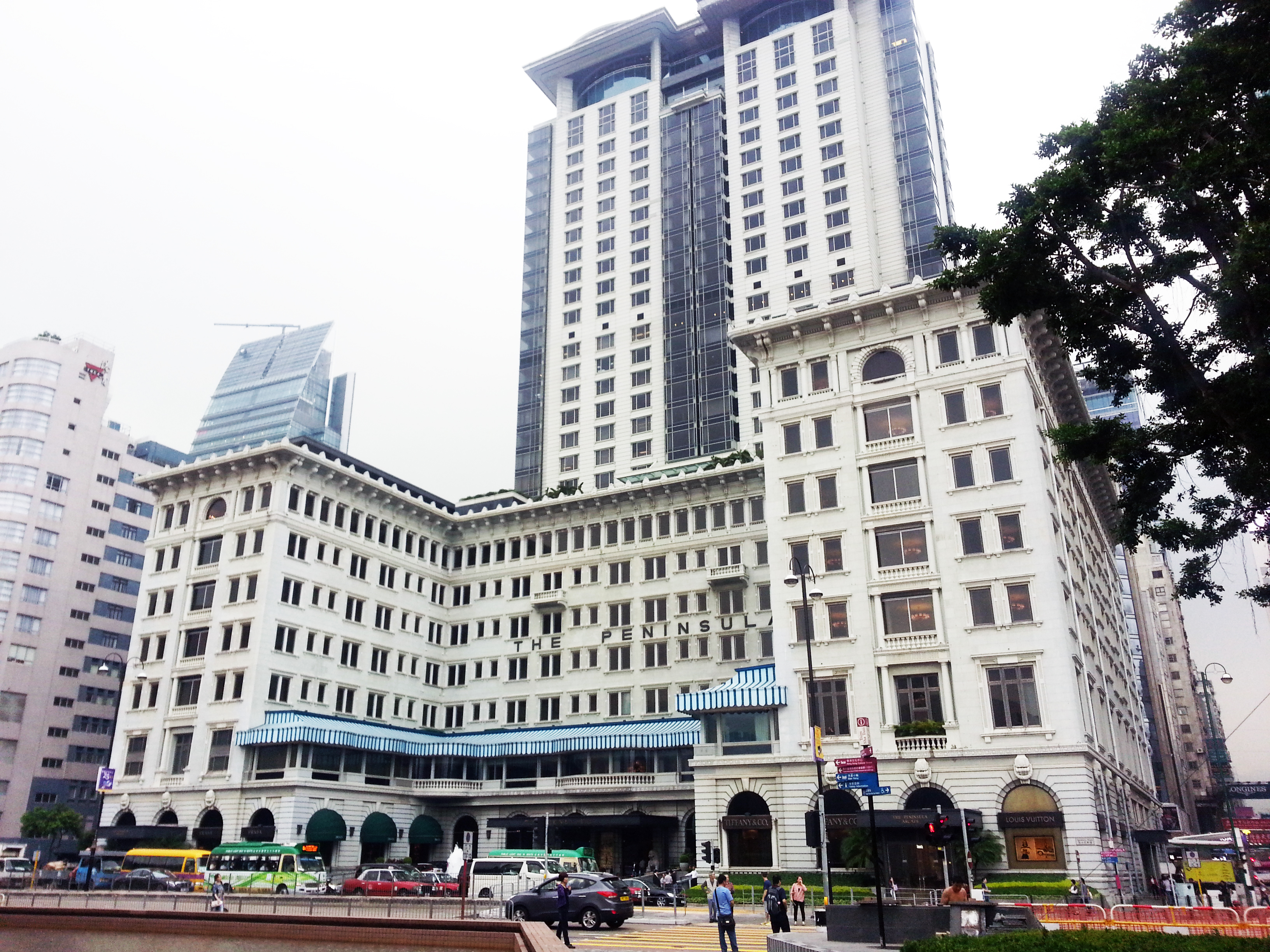
The Peninsula Hotel is the most famous asset of the Kadoorie family.

In 1995, a large Jewish community centre was built next to the Ohel Leah Synagogue, replacing the old Jewish Club. The United Jewish Congregation of Hong Kong moved into this centre, after which religious ceremonies began to be held in the auditorium of the centre, and the rabbi of the community settled in a nearby residential complex. From 1996 to October 1998, the Ohel Leah Synagogue underwent major renovation due to significant wear and tear over nearly a century. The restoration project won the Outstanding Project Award of the 2000 UNESCO Asia Pacific Heritage Awards.

In the mid-1980s, Chabad established a permanent presence in Hong Kong. Rabbi Mordechai Avtzon served the local community beginning in 1985 establishing Chabad's first center in Asia; his posting marked the beginning of the movement's subsequent expansion to 60 centers in the region.

=== 21st century ===
Jewish population in Hong Kong
| Year | Population |
|---|---|
| 1872 | 41 |
| 1876 | 46 |
| 1881 | 71 |
| 1882 | ~60 |
| 1897 | 117 |
| ~1900 | 165 |
| 1954 | 250 |
| 1959 | 230 |
| 1968 | 200 |
| 1974 | ~450 |
| ~1995 | ~3,000–4,000 |
| 1997 | ~2,500–6,000 |
| 2004 | ~3,000 |
| 2010 | ~5,000 |
| 2015 | ~2,500/~5,000 |
| 2019 | ~5,000 |

About 5,000 Jews lived in Hong Kong in 2010, united in seven congregations: the reformist United Jewish Congregation; the Hasidic Chabad with branches in Hong Kong, Kowloon and Lantau; and the Sephardic Orthodox congregations Kehilat Zion (Kowloon) and Shuva Israel (Hong Kong). Most of the Jews are concentrated on Hong Kong Island, where the main objects of Jewish public life are situated—mostly in the Mid-Levels, Central and Admiralty districts. However, there are also Jewish residents in the New Territories and Kowloon, mostly in the Tsim Sha Tsui and East Tsim Sha Tsui districts. Immigrants from the US and Canada predominate, although there are also immigrants from Western Europe (Great Britain, France, Spain, Switzerland), Israel, South Africa, Australia and New Zealand. Expatriates working in Hong Kong include businessmen, managers, skilled professionals, journalists, teachers and professors. Most of the Jews speak Hebrew or English and a very small number of them speak Cantonese or Mandarin. According to the World Jewish Congress, some 2,500 Jews lived in Hong Kong in 2015; while according to the Jewish Historical Society of Hong Kong, the number was closer to 5,000. As of 2019, about 5,000 Jews live in Hong Kong.

The most important cluster where the Jews of Hong Kong gather is located on Robinson Road in the Mid-Levels. Built in 1995, the Jewish Community Centre is located here, which includes a library, a Chinese-Jewish archive, a learning centre, a multi-purpose auditorium, an indoor pool, a gym, a kosher meat and dairy restaurant, a cafe and a kosher grocery store. Adjacent to the centre is the historic Ohel Leah Synagogue, with Hong Kong's only mikveh. The Consulate General of Israel is located in the second tower of the Admiralty Centre office complex on Harcourt Road in the Admiralty district.

Among the modern significant members of the Jewish community of Hong Kong are:

- Michael Kadoorie (the son of Lawrence Kadoorie): chairman and co-owner of CLP Group, Hongkong and Shanghai Hotels and Metrojet airlines, and member of the board of directors of CK Hutchison Holdings
- Allan Zeman: restaurateur, hotelier and property developer, member of the board of directors of the gambling group Wynn Resorts, also known as the "father" of Hong Kong's Lan Kwai Fong entertainment district

== Religious life ==
The Jews in Hong Kong freely practice their religious holidays, including holding Shabbat meals, celebrating the main Jewish holidays (Yom Kippur, Rosh Hashanah, Hanukkah, Shavuot, Pesach and others), and developing religious educational programs. Hong Kong has four active synagogues (three of which have full-time rabbis), a Jewish school (Carmel School for young children), two Sunday schools (the Ezekiel Abraham School for teenagers and the Shorashim school for children), and a Jewish cemetery in the Happy Valley area. The main synagogue is Ohel Leah, built in 1901–1902. While it is formally aligned to Modern Orthodox Judaism, the synagogue is visited by adherents of Chabad-Lubavitch Hasidism, Reform Judaism, and Conservative Judaism.

The Jewish Community Centre is home to the United Jewish Congregation of Hong Kong, which caters to about 500 people who belong to heterodox currents of Judaism (reformists, liberals and conservatives). Since its founding in 1988, the congregation has been closely associated with the Jerusalem-based World Union for Progressive Judaism and the Australian Union for Progressive Judaism.

The Sephardic congregation Shuva Israel is located in the Fortune House, in Central District. It provides restaurants and offices with kosher food, conducts worship services, teaches adults and children, and provides other services to residents and tourists. A synagogue, study hall, library, restaurant, and kosher grocery occupy two floors of the community office. In addition, ten families of the congregation have their own preschool and cheder in the Pok Fu Lam area.

The Hoover Court building on McDonnell Road in the Mid-Levels is home to the Chabad of Hong Kong office, and on Chatham Road in Tsim Sha Tsui is the Chabad of Kowloon office, opened in 2005 in the Oriental Centre building. The Chabad-Lubavitcher Hasidim are an active but isolated Jewish community in Hong Kong. Arriving in Hong Kong in 1985, the city has become the headquarters for the Chabad-Lubavitcher in Asia.

The business complex Wing On Plaza in the Tsim Sha Tsui East area houses the office of the Sephardic community Kehilat Zion, which unites more than 900 people. Founded in 1995 by a Syrian businessman and the Jerusalem Sephardic Center, the Community Synagogue serves the faithful throughout Kowloon. The spiritual leader of Kehilat Zion is also the Chief Rabbi of the entire Sephardic community in Hong Kong. The community manages a library and a kosher restaurant, lectures and seminars, provides kosher food and reserves hotel rooms for those who wish.

== Jewish cemetery ==
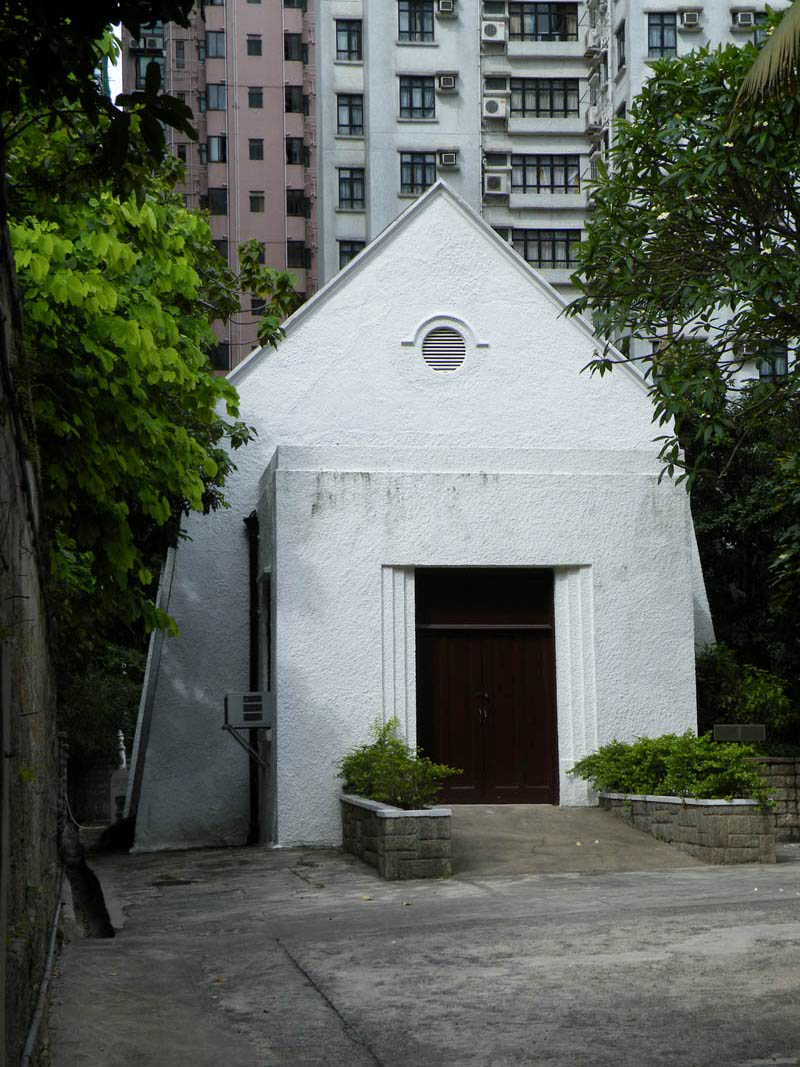
Chapel at the Jewish cemetery

The Hong Kong Jewish Cemetery is located in the Happy Valley district. It was founded in 1855 thanks to donations from businessman David Sassoon (formally, the British authorities signed permits for the cemetery only in 1858). The cemetery is surrounded on all sides by high-rise residential buildings; it is accessible along a narrow passage between a Buddhist temple and a school attached to it. This is one of the few Jewish cemeteries in the Far East that have been preserved in their original location.

The cemetery is oriented from east to west, and most of the graves are located at the western entrance. The oldest grave is dated 1857. The funeral lists indicate that most of the dead in the early years of the cemetery were men, since at that time it was not customary for travellers to settle in Hong Kong with their families. Sixteen of the oldest graves do not bear the names of those buried there, only identification numbers.

Sephardic graves from the late 19th century are grouped in the eastern part of the cemetery, while Ashkenazi graves are grouped in the western, behind the chapel. The chapel itself and other small buildings appeared at the beginning of the 20th century, during the rule of the Jewish governor Matthew Nathan. In 1904, a 75-year lease was signed on a piece of land adjacent to the cemetery, and in 1979 it was extended for another 75 years.

The cemetery is dominated by simple graves, although the first tombstones were made in the form of massive granite sarcophagi. The Sephardic Belilios family built white marble canopies in the Ionic style over their graves. The Kadoorie and Gubbai families, whose graves are located together, preferred tombstones with narrow polished granite sarcophagi covered with protruding lids. Often, tombstones are decorated with various elements—flowers, foliage, swirls or garlands. One grave has a single broken column, which indicates an untimely death, and another has a photograph on the grave, which was a Russian tradition. The inscriptions are short: only the date of death, sometimes the date of birth, very rarely the place of death. Most of the inscriptions are made in Hebrew and English; inscriptions in Arabic, Russian or Dutch are less common.

== Education ==
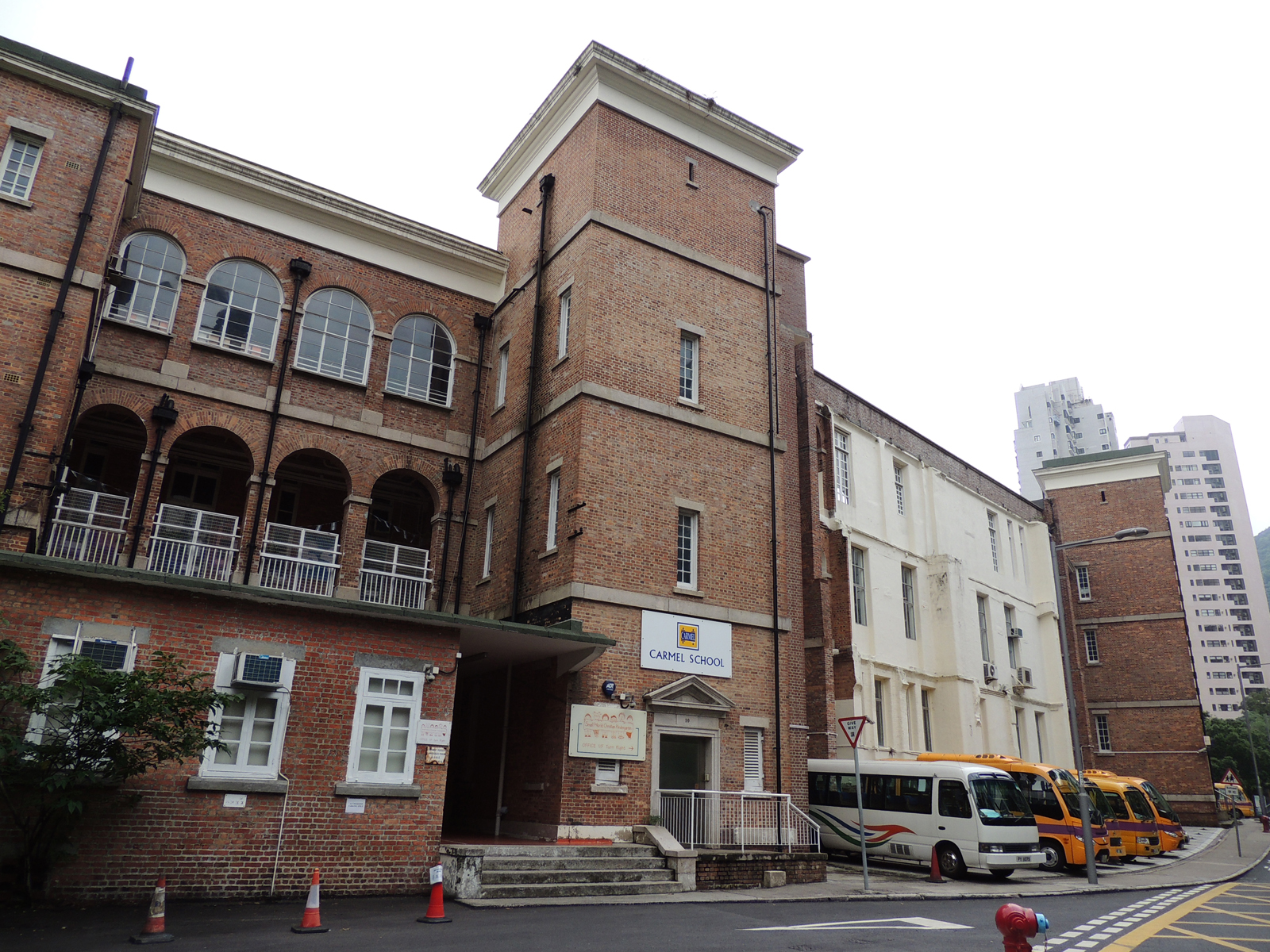
Carmel School in Mid-Levels district

Jewish schooling has historically not been very strong in Hong Kong. A 1914 report stated that there were no religious schools in Hong Kong at that time. Another report in 1936 stated that a small school had opened "some time ago", but was closed due to the "lack of interest in parents in sending their children to learn Hebrew". In 1969, the Ezekiel Abraham School was founded as a volunteer-run Sunday school. There had also been no attempts to set up a Jewish day school in Hong Kong due to the small number of Jewish children. However, in the early 1990s, Carmel School became Hong Kong's first Jewish day school with an enrolment of thirty children. A few years after its opening, the school had more than fifty applications for preschool enrollment.

As of 2022, Carmel School Association has three campuses: Holly Rofé Early Learning Centre, Carmel Elementary School, and Elsa High School in Shau Kei Wan, which also has non-Jewish students. Elsa High School includes science laboratories, a library, music, art and design classrooms, a 500-seat auditorium, conference and fitness rooms, and an all-weather artificial turf field. The Jewish Community Centre, located in the Mid-Levels area on Robinson Road, operates the Holly Rofé Early Learning Center. It includes an indoor pool, gym and playgrounds. Carmel Elementary and Preschool is located in the Mid-Levels on Borrett Road on the place of a former British military hospital, which opened in 1907. In 1967, the hospital was moved to Kowloon, and the military turned over the empty buildings to the colonial government. In the early 1990s, the east wing of the former hospital was occupied by the Carmel school, which provided religious and secular education according to the tenets of Modern Orthodox Judaism. The school has a library, music and art classes, computer science and programming classes, special education classes, an indoor gym, playgrounds and sports grounds, and a public garden.

In 1999, the United Jewish Congregation of Hong Kong opened its own religious school, Shorashim School. In 2010, a local branch of the Israel Boy and Girl Scouts Federation was opened in Hong Kong.

== Culture and sports ==
The Jewish Community Centre is home to the Jewish Historical Society of Hong Kong, founded in 1984 by Denis and Mary Leventhal and Anita Buxbaum with the participation of Professor S. J. Chan, who studied Kaifeng Jews. The Society searches for, researches and preserves historical materials on Jews and Judaism in Hong Kong and China, holds exhibitions, lectures and seminars, and publishes books and collections of documents. The Library of the Jewish Historical Society is considered one of the best in Asia on the topic of Chinese Jews. In addition, the society holds many unique photographs and documents, as well as audio recordings of interviews with members of the Jewish community. The society also conducts group tours to historical Jewish places in the region.

In 1999, Canadian Howard Elias founded the annual Hong Kong Jewish Film Festival, which includes films and documentaries from around the world, dedicated to various Jewish themes. The Hong Kong Jewish Women's Association, founded in the 1940s to help Jewish refugees from Shanghai, continues to play an important role in the community. It annually implements many cultural, social and educational programs, and also collects donations for charitable organisations in Israel and for the local Jewish community.

The Israeli Consulate in Hong Kong oversees the Israeli Film Festival, which takes place every three years, as well as the children's and adult football teams of the Maccabi sports association. The Hong Kong Jewish community raises funds for various programs of the Israeli organisation Keren Hayesod, annually widely celebrates Israel's Independence Day and Yom HaZikaron, and also holds events in support of non-profit organisations the Jewish National Fund and the United Israel Appeal.

=== Cuisine ===
Hong Kong's kosher restaurants include Sabra Meat Restaurant and Waterside Dairy Restaurant located in the Jewish Community Centre, Mul Hayam Restaurant run by Kehilat Zion in Kowloon, and Shalom Grill run by Shuva Yisrael in the Central District. Almost all Jewish congregations in Hong Kong provide kosher food delivery services to homes and hotels, and organise banquets and off-site receptions.

== Antisemitism ==
The thesis about the absence of antisemitism in Hong Kong is common. No report published prior to World War II mentioned the existence of antisemitism against Hong Kong Jews. In the early colonial period, wealthy Jewish merchants from Britain were traditionally referred to as "white Europeans", identified with the privileged class of the British colony. However, there are cases when even rich merchants from among the Baghdadi Jews were denied membership in the elite Hong Kong Club (founded in 1846), where only British Anglicans were allowed to rest.

According to a survey conducted in 1989, 83% of Hong Kongers declared a neutral attitude towards Jews or were ignorant of the life of Jews living in the city, and another 15% of Hong Kongers noted a positive attitude towards them. The standard explanation for these statistics is that the Jewish presence in Hong Kong has always been small, and prominent members of the community have been successful in commerce and philanthropy. Generally, Chinese people do not receive a balanced, in-depth account of Jewish history and culture as part of their education. Most Hong Kong Chinese could not clearly explain the general difference between the State of Israel, the Jews, and Judaism. Because of this, according to historian Jonathan Goldstein, it is difficult to say with certainty that the dominant neutral attitude towards Jews means there is no latent antisemitism.

In April 1991, the local Chinese-language newspaper Hong Kong Daily News published an article titled "The Jews' Deep-Rooted Bad Habits: The Bad Nature of the Jews". The article contained statements such as "Why have these people (the Jews) been cursed by God to wander the world forever?" and "(Jews) are heartless, rich, cruel and ruthless warmongers, a selfish and avaricious race". The article angered the local Jewish community, which sent a letter of protest to the newspaper's office, and the newspaper published a reply stating that the article did not violate editorial policy. While preparing a lawsuit against the newspaper, the Jewish Initiative Group found that there is no article in Hong Kong law prohibiting incitement to racial violence.

Some minor anti-semitic incidents have involved immigrants. This became especially noticeable in 1987–1988 against the backdrop of public controversy around a plan for the redevelopment of Jewish Trust property. The controversy concerned the reconstruction of the historical synagogue Ohel Leah and control over this process by the authorities. The dispute gave rise to unsubstantiated accusations in the local English-language press of both the synagogue committee and the Jews in general.

For a long time, the only local school with high American educational standards was the Hong Kong International School in the Southern district, owned by the Lutheran Church–Missouri Synod. Children of American and European Jews who went to this school often faced strict Christian rules (compulsory attendance at the chapel, the study of Christian dogmas) and attempts at proselytism by individual teachers. Jewish residents have reported several anti-semitic manifestations in 2002 and 2003.

== See also ==
- Hong Kong-Israel relations

== Bibliography ==
- Carroll, John Mark (2009). Edge of Empires: Chinese Elites and British Colonials in Hong Kong. Harvard University Press. ISBN 978-0-6740-2923-1.
- Cesarani, David (2002). Port Jews: Jewish Communities in Cosmopolitan Maritime Trading Centres, 1550–1950. Routledge. ISBN 978-0-7146-8286-0.
- Eber, Irene (2012). Wartime Shanghai and the Jewish Refugees from Central Europe: Survival, Co-Existence, and Identity in a Multi-Ethnic City. Berlin: Walter de Gruyter. ISBN 978-3-1102-6818-8.
- Ember, Melvin; Ember, Carol R.; Skoggard, Ian (2004). Encyclopedia of Diasporas: Immigrant and Refugee Cultures Around the World. Springer Science & Business Media. ISBN 978-0-3064-8321-9.
- Faure, David (1997). Society. A Documentary History of Hong Kong. Vol. 1. Hong Kong University Press. ISBN 978-9-6220-9393-5.
- Finel-Honigman, Irene (2009). A Cultural History of Finance. Routledge. ISBN 978-1-135-23851-3.
- Gilman, Sander (2014). Judaism, Christianity, and Islam: Collaboration and Conflict in the Age of Diaspora. Hong Kong University Press. ISBN 978-9-8882-0827-2.
- Goldstein, Jonathan (1998). The Jews of China. Armonk, New York: M. E. Sharpe. ISBN 978-0-7656-3631-7.
- Goldstein, Jonathan; Schwartz, Benjamin I. (2015). The Jews of China: Historical and Comparative Perspectives. Routledge. ISBN 978-1-3174-5605-6.
- Green, Judy; Diestal, Judy (2008). "Jews in Hong Kong". In Ehrlich, Mark Avrum (ed.). Encyclopedia of the Jewish Diaspora: Origins, Experiences, and Culture. ABC-Clio. pp. 1186–1193. ISBN 978-1-8510-9873-6.
- Herschlag, Miriam (1998). "Hong Kong". American Jewish Year Book. 98. American Jewish Committee: 375–385. ISBN 978-0-8749-5113-4.
- Hutter, Manfred (2013). Between Mumbai and Manila: Judaism in Asia Since the Founding of the State of Israel. Vandenhoeck & Ruprecht. ISBN 978-3-8471-0158-1.
- Ivanov, P. M. (1990). Гонконг. История и современность [Hong Kong. History and Modernity] (in Russian). Moscow: Nauka. ISBN 978-5-0201-6958-6.
- Jacobs, Joseph; Lipkind, Goodman (1905). "NATHAN, SIR MATTHEW". Jewish Encyclopedia. Vol. 9. Funk & Wagnalls.
- Jacobs, Joseph; Lipkind, Goodman; Hyams, J. (1906). "SASSOON". Jewish Encyclopedia. Vol. 11. Funk & Wagnalls.
- Kupfer, Peter (2008). Youtai – Presence and Perception of Jews and Judaism in China. Bern, Switzerland: Peter Lang. ISBN 978-3-6315-7533-8.
- Loewenthal, Rudolph (2006). "HONG KONG". Encyclopaedia Judaica. Vol. 9 (2 ed.). Macmillan Publishers. ISBN 978-0-0286-5937-4.
- McDougall, Katrina; Pettman, Bruce Robert (2000). The Ohel Leah Synagogue, Hong Kong: its history and conservation. Jewish Historical Society of Hong Kong. ISBN 978-9-6285-3392-3.
- O'Reilly, James; Habegger, Larry; O'Reilly, Sean (1996). Hong Kong: Including Macau and Southern China. Travelers' Tales. ISBN 978-1-8852-1103-3.
- Plüss, Caroline (1 December 2002). "Assimilation versus Idiosyncrasy: Strategic Constructions of Sephardic Identities in Hong Kong". Jewish Culture and History. 5 (2): 48–69. doi:10.1080/1462169X.2002.10511973. ISSN 1462-169X. S2CID 142983538.
- Plüss, Caroline (January 2011). "Baghdadi Jews in Hong Kong: converting cultural, social and economic capital among three transregional networks". Global Networks. 11 (1): 82–96. doi:10.1111/j.1471-0374.2011.00308.x.
- Rubinstein, William D.; Jolles, Michael; Rubinstein, Hilary L. (2011). The Palgrave Dictionary of Anglo-Jewish History. Palgrave Macmillan. ISBN 978-1-4039-3910-4.
- Samra, Myer (2008). "Migration Patterns of Iraqi Jews". In Ehrlich, Mark Avrum (ed.). Encyclopedia of the Jewish Diaspora: Origins, Experiences, and Culture. ABC-Clio. pp. 354–360. ISBN 978-1-8510-9873-6.
- Smith, Carl T. (1995). A sense of history: studies in the social and urban history of Hong Kong. Hong Kong Educational Publishing Company. ISBN 978-9-6229-0313-5.
- Tigay, Alan M. (1994). The Jewish Traveler: Hadassah Magazine's Guide to the World's Jewish Communities and Sights. Lanham, Maryland: Rowman & Littlefield. ISBN 978-1-5682-1078-0.
- Tsang, Steve (2007). A Modern History of Hong Kong. I.B. Tauris. ISBN 978-1-84511-419-0.
- Wald, Salomon (2004). China and the Jewish People: Old Civilizations in a New Era: Strategy Paper. Gefen Publishing House. p. 73. ISBN 978-9-6522-9347-3.
- Wilson, Paul D. (1986). "Nathan, Sir Matthew (1862–1939)". Australian Dictionary of Biography. 10.
- Yap, Felicia (2010). "Sex and Stereotypes: Eurasians, Jews and the Politics of Race and Religion in British Asia during the Second World War". Social Scientist. 38 (3/4): 74–93. ISSN 0970-0293. JSTOR 27866701.
