= Kaddouri =

Origin
- Language: Arabic
- Region of origin: Iraq (Baghdad), Arabic surname found among Muslims and Jews (Jewish variant spelled "Kedourie")

Kaddouri (Arabic: خضوري, derived from "green", akhdar in Arabic; Hebrew: כדורי (transliterated; does not mean green in Hebrew); Judeo-Arabic: כׄצׄורי) and many other transliterations, is an Arabic surname. People with the surname include:

- Badr El Kaddouri (born 1981), Moroccan footballer
- Elie Kedourie (1926–1992), British historian
- Majid Khadduri (1909–2007), Iraqi academic
- Omar El Kaddouri (born 1990), Belgian footballer
- Sylvia Kedourie (1925–2016), British historian

== Others ==
- Kadoorie family, Jewish family originally from Baghdad, then Bombay, Shanghai, and finally Hong Kong
  - Ellis Kadoorie (1865–1922), philanthropist and businessman
    - Kadoorie Agricultural High School and youth village in Israel, founded by Sir Ellis Kadoorie
    - Palestine Technical University - Kadoorie, the Arab twin institution of the Jewish Kadoorie Agricultural School
  - Elly Kadoorie (1867–1944), philanthropist and businessman
  - Lawrence Kadoorie, Baron Kadoorie (1899–1993), industrialist, hotelier
  - Horace Kadoorie (1902–1995), industrialist, hotelier, and philanthropist
    - Kadoorie Farm and Botanic Garden, a farm and bontanic garden in Hong Kong established by Lawrence and Horace Kadoorie.
  - Michael Kadoorie (b. 1941), businessman and philanthropist
- Yitzhak Kaduri (died 2006), Haredi (Ultra Orthodox) rabbi and kabbalist
