= Kaddouri (disambiguation) =

Kaddouri (Arabic: خضوري, Hebrew: כדורי) and many other transliterations is a surname.

Kaddouri may also refer to:

- Kadoorie Agricultural High School, an agricultural school and youth village in Israel
- Kadoorie Farm and Botanic Garden, Hong Kong
- Kadoorie Institute, West Bank
- Sir Ellis Kadoorie Secondary School (West Kowloon), Hong Kong
- Kadoorie Synagogue, Portugal
- Palestine Technical University – Kadoorie, West Bank
