= Kadoorie Synagogue =

Orthodox synagogue in Porto, Portugal

Kadoorie Mekor Haim Synagogue
- Portuguese: Sinagoga Kadoorie Mekor Haim
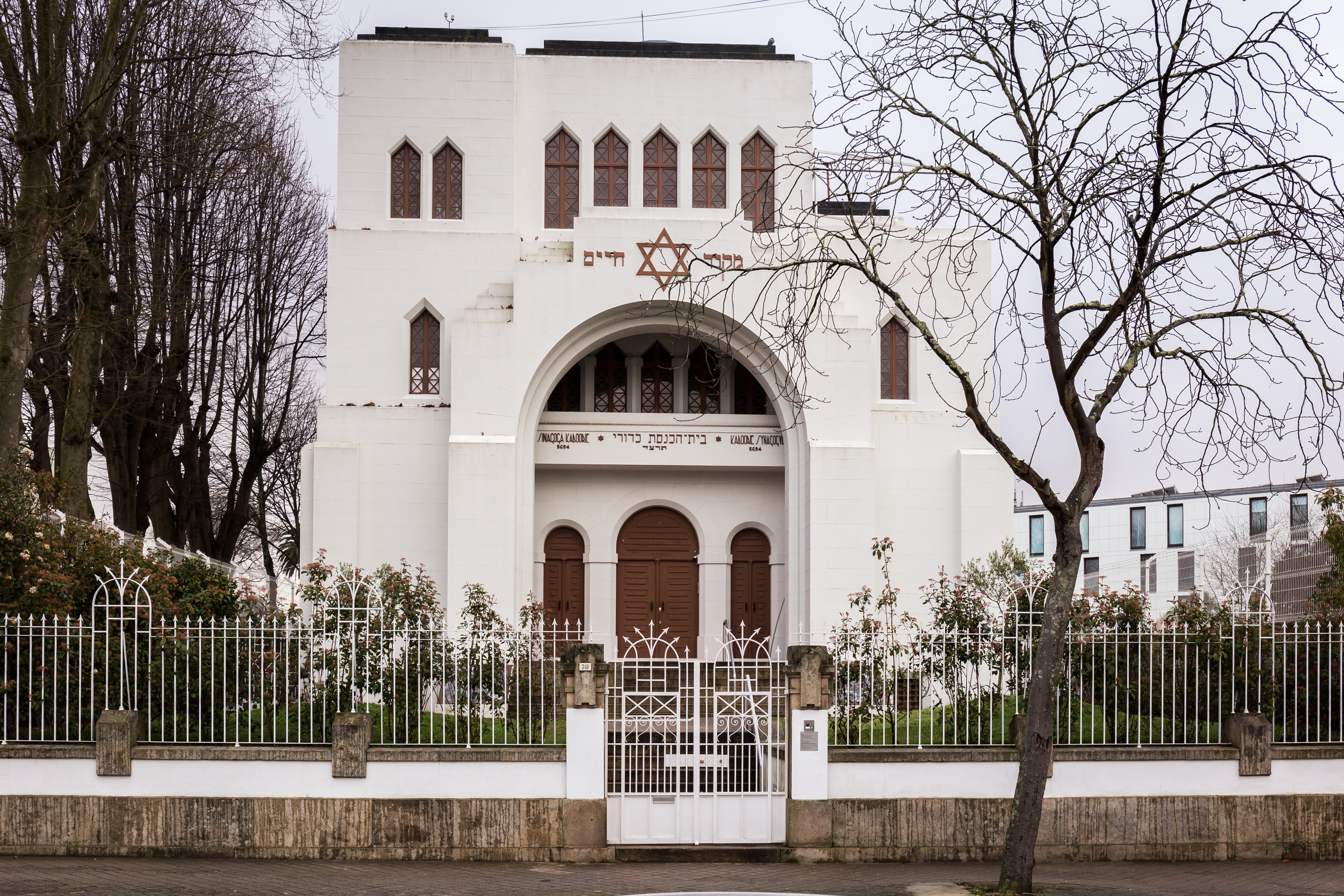
- The façade of the synagogue, along the Rua Guerra Junqueiro, in 2017

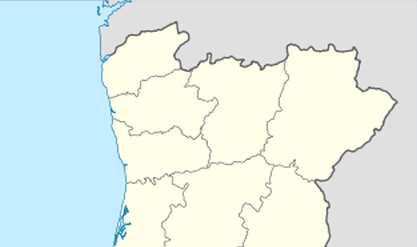
- Location of the synagogue in the northern region of Portugal

Religion
- Affiliation: Orthodox Judaism
- Rite: Nusach Sefard
- Ecclesiastical or organisational status: Synagogue
- Governing body: Instituto Gestão do Patrimonio Arquitectónico e Arqueológico
- Status: Active

Location
- Location: 340 Guerra Junqueiro Street, Lordelo do Ouro e Massarelos, Porto, Norte Region
- Country: Portugal
- Coordinates: 41°9′21.38″N 8°38′12.9″W

Architecture
- Architects: Augusto dos Santos Malta; Arthur de Almeida Jr.
- Type: Synagogue architecture
- Style: Art Deco
- Founder: Captain Artur Barros Basto
- General contractor: Pereira de Campos
- Established: 1923 (as a congregation
- Groundbreaking: 1929
- Completed: 1938

Specifications
- Direction of façade: West
- Capacity: 350 seats
- Materials: Brick, azulejo, wood, concrete

Website
- comunidade-israelita-porto.org (in Portuguese)

The Kadoorie Mekor Haim Synagogue (Portuguese: Sinagoga Kadoorie Mekor Haim), also the Porto Synagogue (Portuguese: Sinagoga do Porto), is an Orthodox Jewish congregation and synagogue, located at 340 Guerra Junqueiro Street, in the civil parish of Lordelo do Ouro e Massarelos, the municipality of Porto, in the northern region of Portugal. Mekor haim is Hebrew for 'source of life'.

The synagogue was completed in 1938 in the Art Deco style, and is the largest synagogue in the Iberian Peninsula.

== History ==
The foundation of the synagogue dates to 1923, with the initiatives of the Jewish community in Porto and of Captain Artur Barros Basto, who converted to Judaism. Generally, three organized Jewish communities had existed in Portugal: in Lisbon, Porto and Belmonte; there are 6000 people who consider themselves Jewish. Captain Barros Basto was one of the most important figures in the community, linked to the founding of an organized Jewish movement in the northern community. There were at least twenty Ashkenazi Jews in the city; since there was no synagogue, they needed to travel to Lisbon for all their religious needs.

Barros Basto began to plan a synagogue, officially registering the local Jewish community, the Comunidade Israelita do Porto (Israelite Community of Porto), with the local government in 1923. During this time, the membership used a house on the Rua Elias Garcia. In 1927, Barros Basto founded the Portuguese Jewish newspaper Ha-Lapid.

In 1929, with the aim of trying to convert the Marranos that existed in Trás-os-Montes and Beiras into official Judaism, Barros Basto raised funds. On 13 November 1929 an application for the necessary licensing to begin work was delivered to the municipal council; a few weeks later, the first stone was laid and construction begun. The architects were Artur de Almeida Júnior and Augusto dos Santos Malta (who trained in the Escola das Belas Artes de Porto), in collaboration with interior designer Rogério de Azevedo. Rogério de Azevedo may have executed some of the finish work himself, as some touches, including woodwork in the library, were completed in a style characteristic of his work.

Between 1930 and 1935, the Israeli Technology Institute was installed in the building, even before its completion. The work progressed slowly until 1933, despite support from the Committee for Spanish-Portuguese Jews in London. In 1937, the synagogue was complete thanks to the contributions from the Jewish community in London and from funds donated by the Kadoorie family and Iraqi Jews from Portugal. Upon the death of Laura Kadoorie, the wife of prominent Mizrahi Jewish philanthropist Sir Elly Kadoorie, her children wished to honor their mother, a descendant of Portuguese Jews who had fled the country following the Inquisition. This tribute was reflected in the monetary support by the Kadoorie family to assist in the construction of large part of the synagogue in Porto, which was later renamed Synagogue Kadoorie - Mekor Haim. In the same year, Captain Artur Barros Basto was expelled from the Portuguese army for his participation in circumcisions. The synagogue was inaugurated in 1938. The synagogue has always had a small number of members and, for much of the 20th century, has been entrusted to families in Central and Eastern Europe (Roskin, Kniskinsky, Finkelstein, Cymerman, Pressman and others), who married among themselves.

During the Second World War, hundreds of refugees passed through the doors of the synagogue en route to the United States.

Former Captain Barros Bastos died in 1961.

In 2012, the synagogue was opened to the public.

Representatives from an Israeli governmental agency visited in 2014 and approved co-financing for renovations and security upgrades. On 21 May 2015, the Jewish Museum of Porto was opened to the public. It was inaugurated on 28 June in the presence of the president of the Comunidade Israelita do Porto and various cultural, education and political personalities. A fence was erected along the sides and rear of the building.

The community counts among its members Jews of origins as diverse as Poland, Egypt, the United States, India, Russia, Israel, Spain, Portugal and England. The present rabbi is Daniel Litvak, a native of Argentina, and the current vice president is Isabel Ferreira Lopes, the granddaughter of Captain Barros Basto.

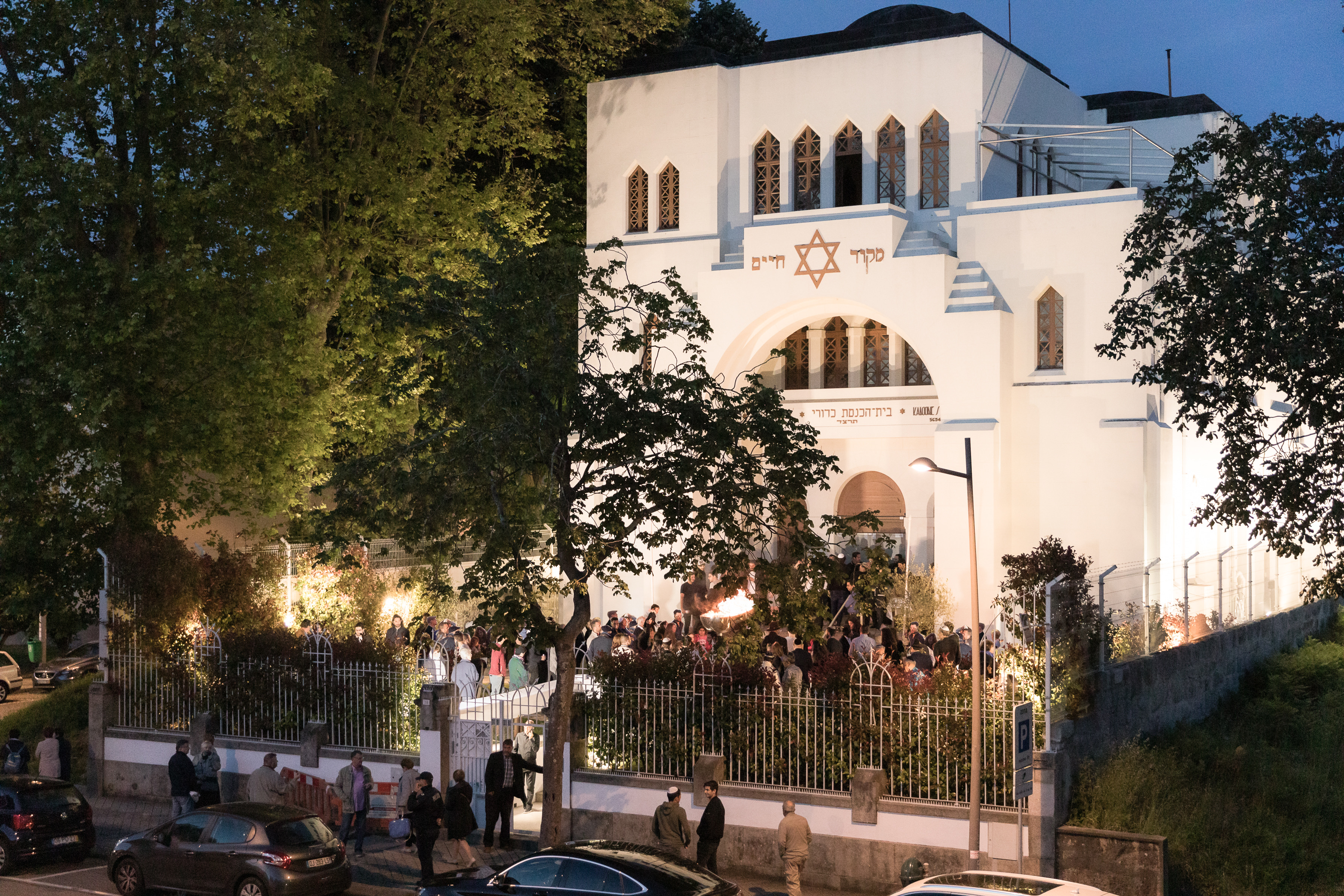
Lag BaOmer, Kadoorie Mekor Haim Synagogue

== Architecture ==
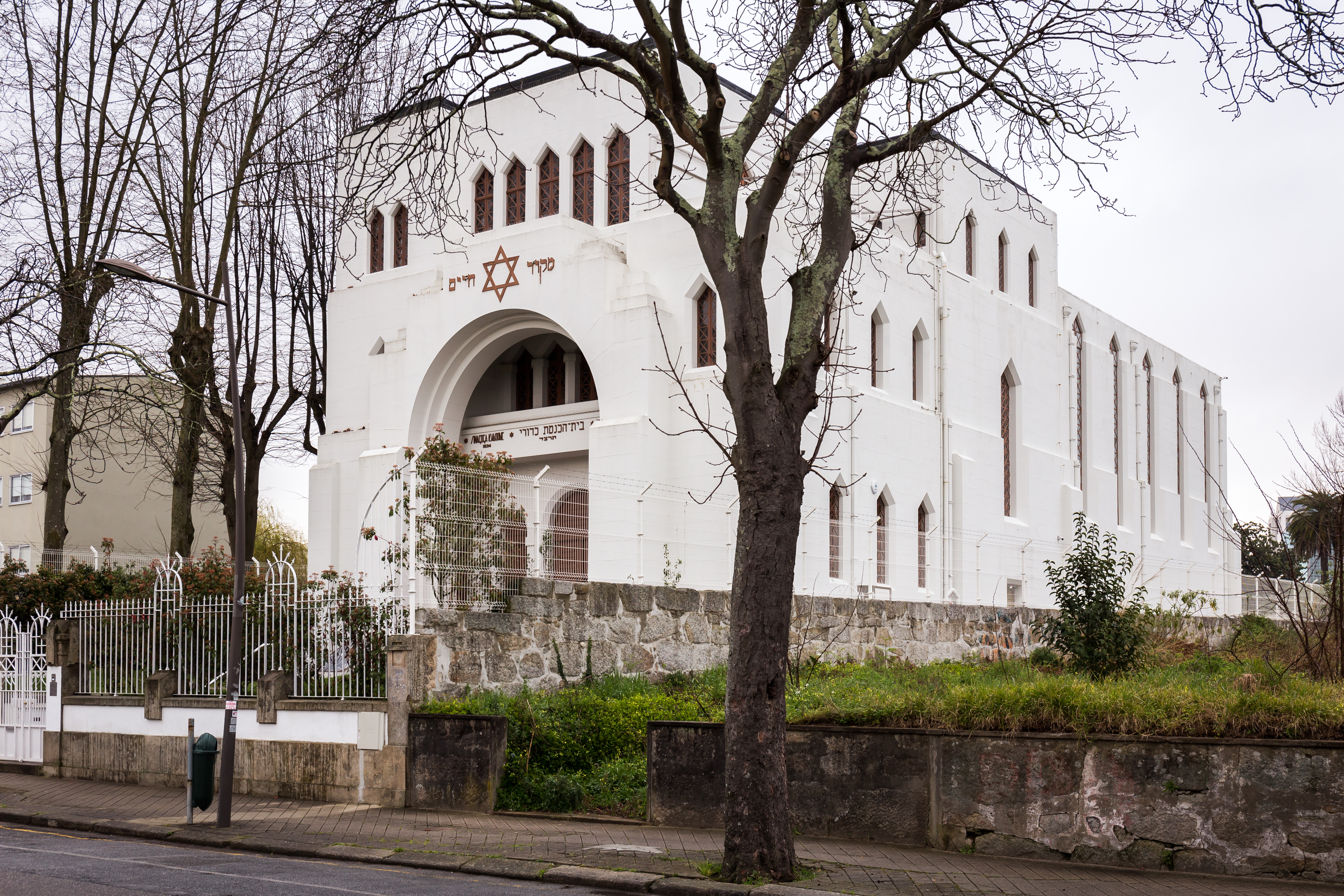
Kadoorie Mekor Haim Synagogue

The building is in an urban context, on an elevated platform encircled by fencing between Rua Guerra Junqueiro and Rua João Martins Branco, in an area of residential homes called Campo Alegre. To the north is a barrio, while to the rear is a small parking lot and the Clube de Ténis do Porto (Porto Tennis Club). Near the rear wall is the Cemitério de Agra Monte (Agra Monte Cemetery) along Rua João Martins Branco.

The temple consists of rectangular structure oriented west to east, covered in differentiated roof tile. Over the entranceway and services is a cupola. The principal facade, oriented to the west, is marked by a galilee with a large arch, with the main portal inset in a recess. In the centre is a balcony with inscriptions and a glazed colonnade, while over the center of the arch is a star of David.

The lateral facades, to the north and south, are characterized by a regular rhythmic distribution of elongated triangular-topped windows. The rear facade, windowless and symmetrical, consists of a plane from which three protruding volumes of flat roof stand out.

The interior is marked by an entrance space flanked by two rooms, followed by the large rectangular hall, flanked on either side by two landing steps and two accessways to further spaces. The hall is the principal celebration space, with a domed ceiling, and is contoured on the upper level by a balcony with two rows of arranged chairs. The remainder of the interior is decorated with Hebrew passages from the Torah, complemented by Moroccan-Sephardic decorations.

== Present ==
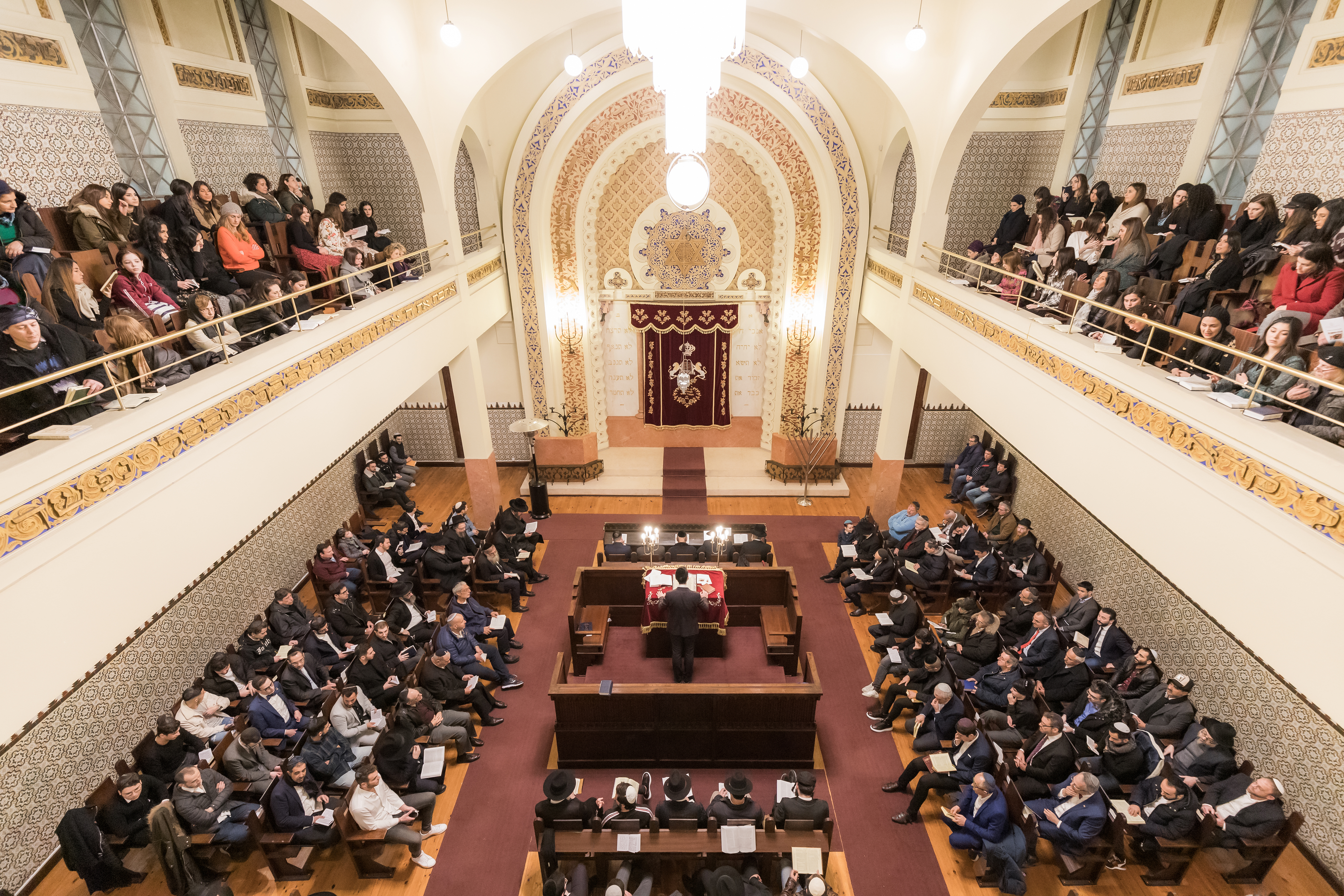
Shabbaton 2020

According to the official blog of the community, it includes about 500 Jews originally from more than thirty countries and gathers all standards and degrees of observance of Judaism. In recent years, the members of the community have connected the organization with the rest of the Jewish world, written the Community's rules, restored the synagogue building, organized departments and created the necessary conditions for Jewish life to flourish again in Porto. The organisation has a beit din, two official rabbis, and structures for kashrut. It offers courses to schoolteachers to combat anti-Semitism, and has a Jewish Museum, a cinema, films about its history, and cooperation protocols with the Portuguese state, the Israeli Embassy to Portugal, B'nai B'rith International, the Anti-Defamation League, Keren Hayesod, and Chabad Lubavitch, as well as with the Porto Diocese and Porto's Muslim community.

The community has an “ecumenical approach” to relating to their non-Jewish neighbors and focuses on education and outreach, cooperating and working on joint projects with the Catholic diocese and Muslim communities.

The creation of the Jewish Museum of Porto is included in a strategy of the local Jewish community to fight antisemitism. This strategy includes school visits to Kadoorie Mekor Haim Synagogue, films about the history of the Jews in Portugal; courses for secondary school teachers and others who are interested in themes relating to Judaism and the history of the Jews, and visits to the city’s Holocaust Museum of Porto.

In 2021, the film "1618", produced as part of the social and cultural project between the Jewish and Catholic communities of Porto, becomes the most awarded Portuguese film ever.

In January 2019, the President of the Republic, Marcelo Rebelo de Sousa, visited the Porto Synagogue, where he attended the celebration of the Shabbat Cabalat, after which he took the floor. Upon arrival, the Head of State was received by the President of the Jewish Community of Porto, Dias Ben Zion, and by the Chief Rabbi, Daniel Litvak.

In September 2020, the Jewish Community of Porto was received by the Mayor of Porto, Rui Moreira, in the City Hall. The Mayor welcomed the leadership of a rapidly growing and rejuvenating community in the city, representing about 500 Jews from more than 30 countries.

In January 2021, the Holocaust Museum of Porto opened, the first of its kind in the Iberian Peninsula.

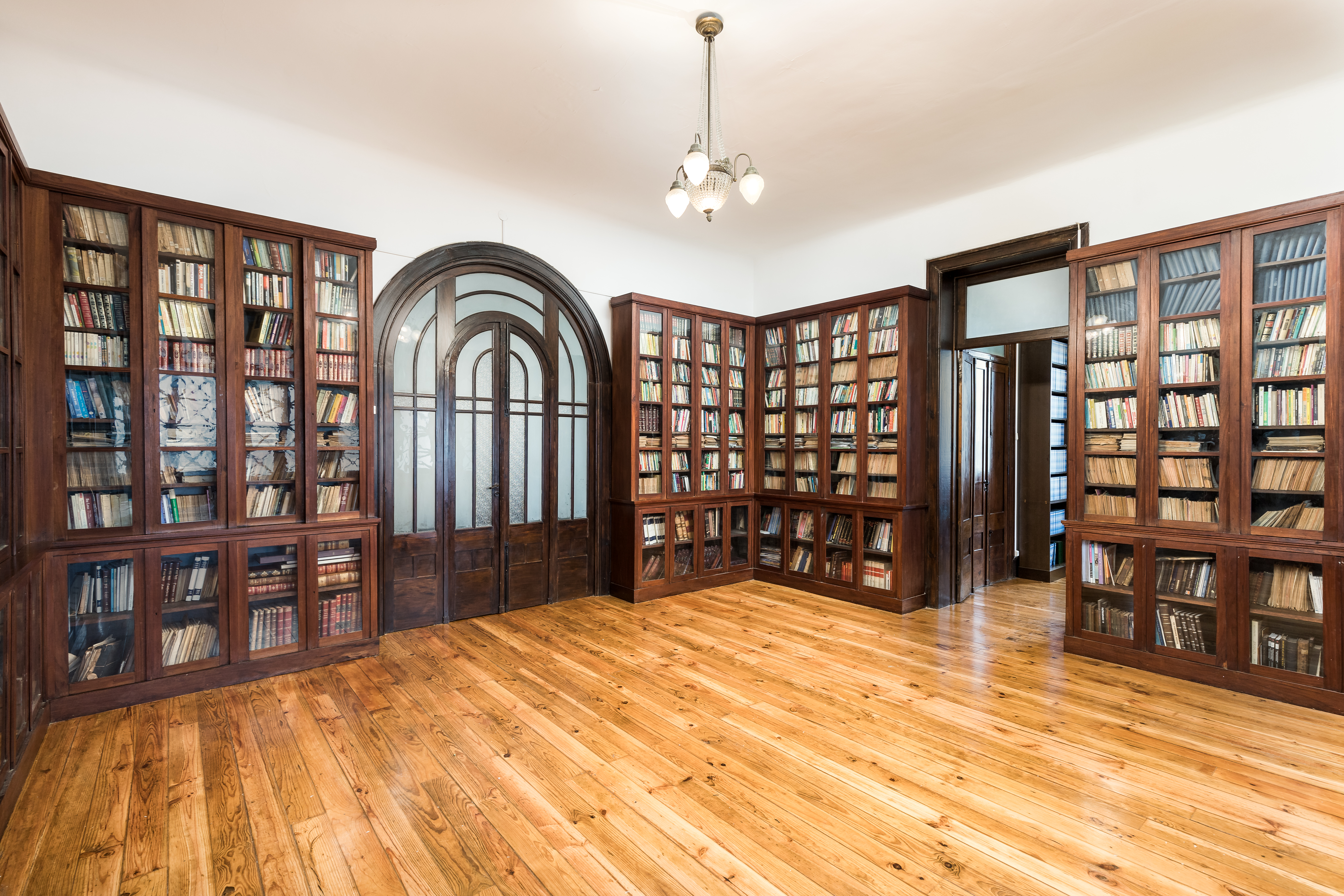
Kadoorie Library

In 2022, during the Russian invasion of Ukraine, the Israeli community of Porto, led by the heads of the synagogue, transferred two of Putin's oligarchs from Ashkenazi to Sefrada to grant them Portuguese citizenship and get them out of sanctions.

In 2023, the synagogue was vandalized with pro-Palestinian slogans.

== See also ==
- History of the Jews in Portugal
- List of synagogues in Portugal
- Portuguese Synagogue (Amsterdam)
