= Lawrence Kadoorie, Baron Kadoorie =

Hong Kong industrialist (1899–1993)

The Right Honourable The Lord Kadoorie CBE
- Born: 2 June 1899; Hong Kong
- Died: 25 August 1993 (aged 94); Hong Kong
- Occupations: industrialist hotelier philanthropist
- Spouse: Muriel Gubbay
- Children: Michael Kadoorie; Rita Kadoorie
- Parent(s): Laura Mocatta Kadoorie; Sir Elly Kadoorie
- Family: Horace Kadoorie (brother); Ellis Kadoorie (uncle)

Lawrence Kadoorie, Baron Kadoorie, CBE (2 June 1899 – 25 August 1993) was a Hong Kong industrialist, hotelier, photographer and philanthropist. He was a member of the Kadoorie family.

== Biography ==
Lawrence Kadoorie was born to the Kadoorie family, a Baghdadi-Jewish family from Bombay, India. He was the older child of Laura (née Mocatta) and Sir Elly Kadoorie. His brother, Horace Kadoorie (1902–1995), would become his partner in the family business.

In 1981, Lawrence Kadoorie became the first Hong Kong born person to be elevated to the peerage as a life peer with the title and style of Baron, and to have become a member of the House of Lords.

His uncle was Sir Ellis Kadoorie. His family were originally Mizrahi Jews from Baghdad who later migrated to Bombay (Mumbai), India in the mid-eighteenth century. He was educated at Clifton College. Kadoorie and his brother Sir Horace Kadoorie worked for Victor Sassoon during the 1920s and 1930s, and managed his famous Shanghai hotel. They also worked for their father Sir Elly Kadoorie.

Graves of Lawrence Kadoorie and his wife, Muriel, in the Jewish Cemetery in Hong Kong

== Awards and philanthropy ==
Kadoorie was made a CBE in the 1970 New Year Honours, knighted in the 1974 New Year Honours and created a life peer in the 1981 Birthday Honours with the Letters Patent issue and his style and title given as Baron Kadoorie, of Kowloon in Hong Kong and of the City of Westminster on 22 September 1981 for his philanthropic work throughout the UK and Hong Kong. Kadoorie and his brother, Horace, both received the Magsaysay Award for public service in 1962. They were also appointed Chevaliers of the Légion d'honneur by the French government. He also gave money to the Kahal Kadosh Mekor Haim (Holy Community Fountain of Life) to finish the construction of the Kadoorie Synagogue for the Anusim/Marranos in Porto, Portugal.

Coat of arms of Lawrence Kadoorie, Baron Kadoorie

Crest
A candlestick of seven branches Or between two cinquefoils Gules.
Escutcheon
Per fess Gules and Vert in chief a flower of Bauhinia Blakeana and the Chinese character denoting double happiness Or and in base a demi Bengal tiger (felis tigris) couped guardant Proper gorged with a collar gemel Sable between the paws a cinquefoil Gules.
Supporters
On either side a Chinese unicorn Proper rampant on the outer slope of a steep mount with a shere inner face Vert growing therefrom a Bauhinia Blakeana flower Gold and between the mounts a waterway barry wavy of four Argent and Azure.
Motto
Adhere And Prosper

== Photography ==
Kadoorie was an enthusiastic amateur photographer, his photographs documented many aspects of the city and rural life of average Hongkongers in the 1950s. He took a slice of life approach on photography, regularly carried a camera with him as he went about daily life. His photographs covered streetscape and landscape, pedestrian, ferry commuters, labour at work, farmers with their live stock, hawkers and many other aspects of the old Hong Kong. His photograph collection was preserved by the Hong Kong Heritage Project, and was featured in photography exhibition "Eye of Hong Kong" in 2017.

== Personal life ==
In 1938, Kadoorie married Muriel Gubbay, the daughter of Hebrew scholar David Sassoon Gubbay. They had two children: a son, Michael Kadoorie (heir to the family business) and a daughter Rita (who married the Scottish accountant Ronald McAulay).

He died on 25 August 1993 and is buried in the Jewish Cemetery in Happy Valley, Hong Kong. His widow, Muriel, died in Hong Kong on 5 December 2011.

== See also ==
- Kadoorie Agricultural Aid Association
