= Ha-Lapid =

Portuguese Jewish newspaper

- Type: Newspaper
- Founded: 1927
- Language: Portuguese
- Ceased publication: 1958
- Headquarters: Porto, Portugal

Ha-Lapid (Hebrew: הלפיד) (lit. "The Torch" in Hebrew) was a Portuguese newspaper, part of the Jewish Community of Porto, founded in 1927 and published until 1958.

== History ==
It was founded and directed by Artur Carlos de Barros Basto (Hebrew name: Abraham Israel Ben-Rosh). The first issue was published in April 1927 and the last in 1958, when all were published 156 numbers. Initially, the periodicity was monthly from 1929 went bimonthly, with the latest figures published semi annually. It was the rescue work of the newspaper Marranos Portuguese, being declared on the first page of the first issue:

Our Community has just lit up this small flare, which will, with God's favor, illuminate the path to many who are strayed from the Only Truth. Our motto is Adonai li ve-lo ira (The Lord is with me and I shall fear nothing) and so, if Blessed God agrees with our Works, with our effort we will soon bring redemption to thousands of Portuguese, to the North of the Tejo, who live a spiritual life with vague reminiscences of their ancestors' religion.

All issues had eight pages contain lessons of normative Judaism, traditions Crypto-Jewish stories Jewish, history of the Jews in Portugal, news of several Portuguese communities (Porto, Bragança, Lisbon, etc.) and Jewish News from the around the world.

It had subscribers in several countries in their propaganda leaflets indicated that it circulated in Portugal, Spain, France, England, Holland, Sweden, Germany, Austria, Italy, Yugoslavia, Greece, Palestine, Brazil, Colombia and United States of America.
