= Artur Carlos de Barros Basto =

Portuguese military officer and writer (1887–1961)

Artur Carlos de Barros Basto Abraham Israel Ben-Rosh אברהם ישראל בן-ראש
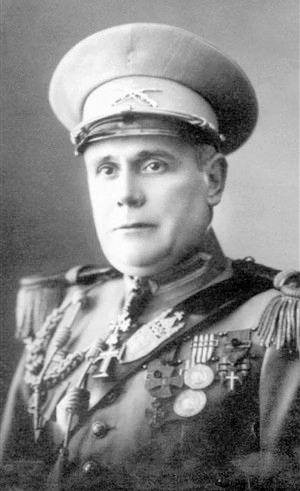
- Born: 18 December 1887; Amarante, Portugal
- Died: 8 March 1961 (aged 73); Porto, Portugal
- Occupations: Captain, writer, Jewish leader
- Movement: Republicanism
- Spouse: Lea Azancot
- Relatives: Isabel Ferreira Lopes (granddaughter); Daniela Ruah (great-grandniece)
- Awards: War Cross (Class III) (Note: Portuguese: Cruz de Guerra Class III – Device is a silver cross) (Portugal)

Artur Carlos de Barros Basto (Hebrew: אברהם ישראל בן-ראש; Abraham Israel Ben-Rosh) (18 December 1887 – 8 March 1961) was a Portuguese military officer and writer, who published several works related to Judaism. He was an important Jewish leader and one of the people who established the Jewish Community in Porto and assisted the construction of the Kadoorie Synagogue, the largest synagogue in the Iberian Peninsula. Furthermore, he helped the return of Crypto-Jews to the Jewish people and, during World War II, helped Jewish refugees escape the Holocaust.

== Life and work ==
When Barros Basto was still young his dying grandfather revealed to him that he had Jewish ancestors. His family had not kept the Jewish precepts and so he became aware of the existence of Jews in Portugal only in 1904; the year he read a newspaper article referring to the inauguration of the synagogue Shaaré Tikva, in Lisbon.

Years later, he joined the army, and when ordered to attend a course at the Escola Politécnica de Lisboa (Technical School of Lisbon), the young Barros Basto went to the synagogue of the city in an attempt to be admitted there. The leaders of the synagogue refused him permission but Barros Basto was undeterred.

When the Republic was established in 1910 Barros Bastos was the one who raised the Republican flag in the city of Porto.

During the First World War, as a lieutenant of the army he commanded a battalion of the Portuguese Expeditionary Corps in the front of Flanders. For his acts of bravery and honor on the battlefield he was awarded medals and promoted to captain.

Barros Basto was self-taught, and after learning Hebrew he lived for a while in Morocco where he began a formal process of conversion to Judaism (known in Hebrew as Giur). This process completed when he was circumcised in Tangier and later subjected to a rabbinical court (Beit Din). After which he changed his name to Abraham Israel Ben-Rosh.

Back in Lisbon, he married Lea Israel Montero Azancot, of the Jewish Community of Lisbon, with whom he had a son and a daughter. He also had several grandchildren and great-grandchildren; his granddaughter, Isabel Ferreira Lopes, is the current vice president of the Jewish Community of Porto. He is also great-granduncle of the actress Daniela Ruah.

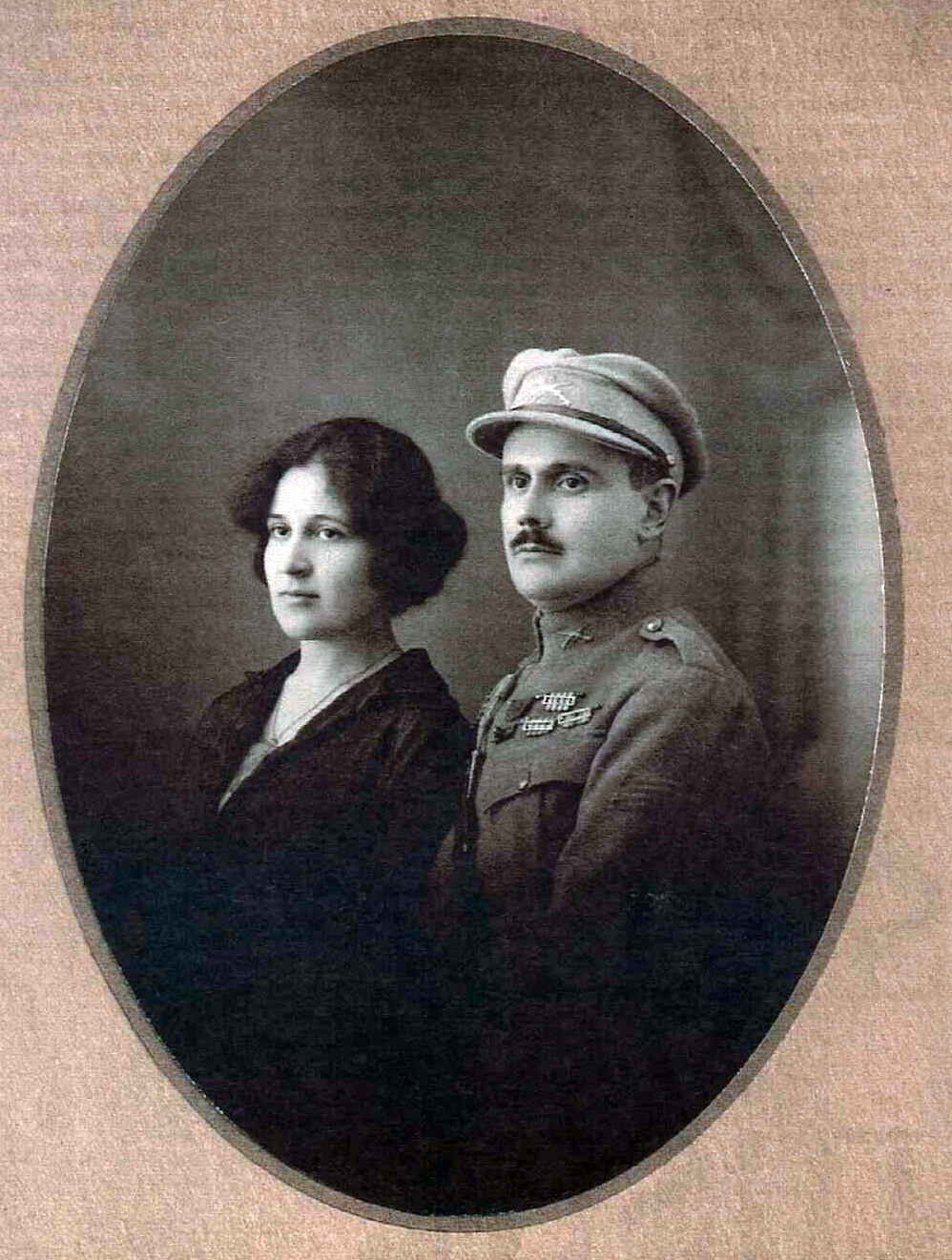
Lea Azancot and Barros Basto

In 1921 he returned to Porto with his wife. At that time Barros Basto realized that there were fewer than twenty Ashkenazi Jews living in the city. As there wasn't a synagogue in Porto these Jews were not organized and had to travel to Lisbon for religious purposes whenever necessary.

Upon learning that reality he began to think about building a synagogue and took initiative in 1923, by officially registering the Jewish Community of Porto and the Israelite Theological Center in the City Council of Porto.

The current building of the synagogue was built years later but the community was organized and rented a house on the street Elias Garcia, which started to function as a synagogue. As time went on, more and more people started to appear in the synagogue. They said they were descendants of Jews forced to convert in the 15th century and claimed to maintain alive yet some Jewish practices and rituals, in the secrecy of their homes. These people, the crypto-Jews, began to participate in religious services.

In 1927, he founded and directed a Portuguese Jewish newspaper called Ha-Lapid.

The claims of the crypto-Jews were proven true by Barros Basto and the committee of London, who found that they did not lie about their origins since they proved to still keep prayers to Hashem and respect the Sabbath as their ancestors. It should also be noted that on the Act nr. 68 Directorate (Maâmad) of the Jewish Community of Porto it was written that anyone who could "absolutely prove their Jewish origin" would be admitted into the congregation.

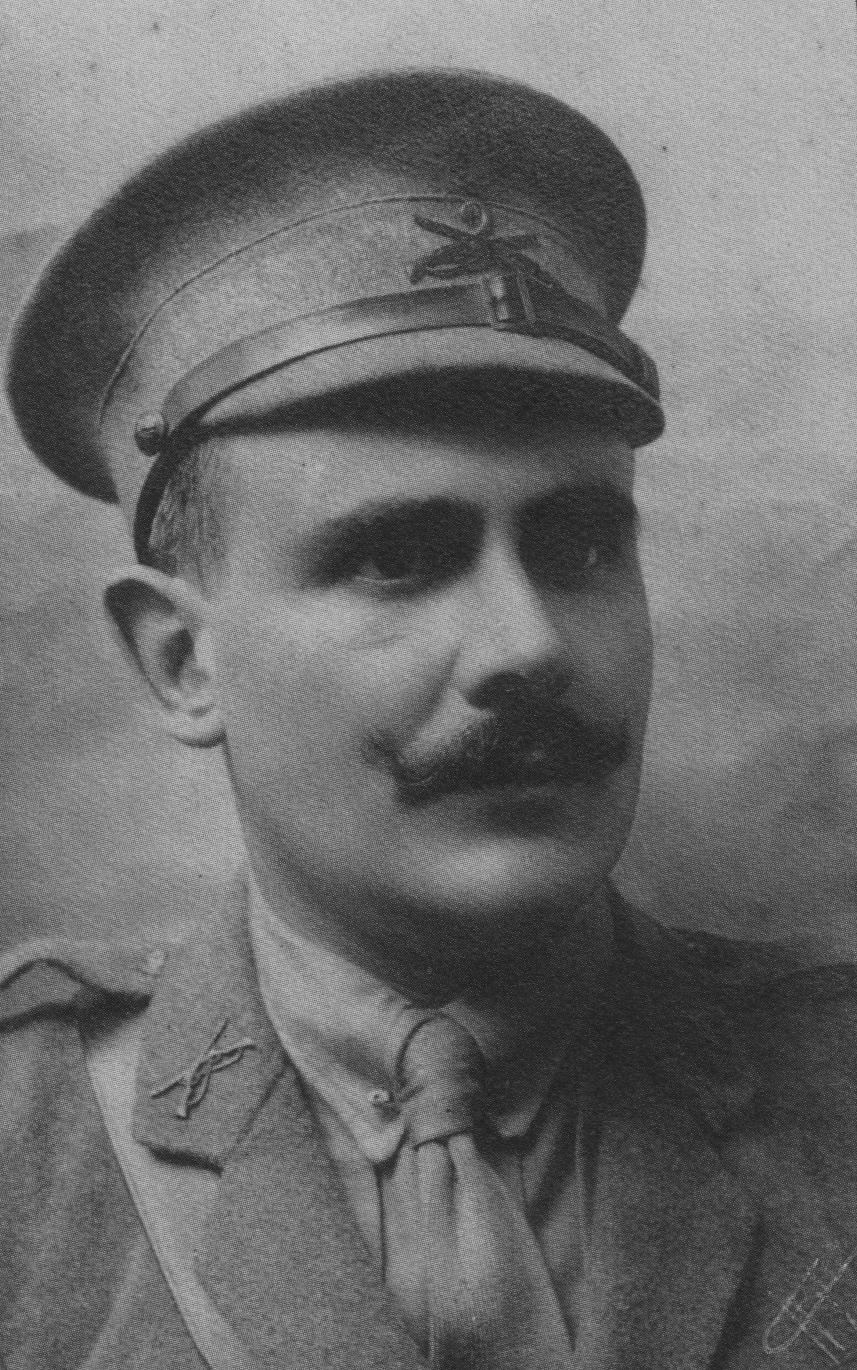
Barros Basto

This occurrence sparked Barros Basto's interest, who therefore, decided to visit frequently the villages and towns of the Trás os Montes and Beiras regions, looking for more people interested in returning to Judaism. This measure gained the attention of some people, especially some Jewish communities, as is the case of the Community of Portuguese Jews in London, who created the "Portuguese Marranos Committee", an organization dedicated to help people who wanted to return to Judaism.

With the change of regime in the 1930s, Barros Basto was associated with the opposition, and was soon being chased by the army. He started to be placed in locations farther away from Porto, in an attempt to push him away from the Synagogue and the Community.

In 1937, Barros Basto was adjudicated by the Disciplinary Board of the Army and was dismissed from the institution for allegedly participating in circumcision ceremonies (in Hebrew, brit milah) of the students of the Israelite Theological Institute of Porto, which the Council considered an "immoral" act, while it is actually a fundamental practice of the Jewish people.

A year later, in 1938, Barros Basto saw the inauguration of his great project, the Kadoorie Synagogue in Porto. Its construction was started in 1929 when Barros Basto was able to gather funds to buy land and build. This became the headquarters of the Jewish Community of Porto and still retains its religious functions.

During World War II, having been already dismissed from the army, Barros Basto helped hundreds of Jews escape the war and the Holocaust, allowing them to start a new life elsewhere. Recently the Jewish Community of Porto signed a protocol with the United States Holocaust Memorial Museum in order to provide it with thousands of documents and records of individual refugees, who, with the help of Barros Basto, could then rebuild their lives with a start point in Porto.

He died in 1961, and was, according to his wish, buried in Amarante, the city where he was born. He was wearing the uniform with which he always served his country. On his deathbed he said that one day there would be justice, but this justice only would come in 2012, over 50 years after his death.

== Rehabilitation ==
Following a petition presented to Parliament on 31 October 2011 by his granddaughter, Isabel Ferreira Lopes, the name of Barros Basto was rehabilitated to 29 February 2012.

The petition, which was approved unanimously by all political parties, presents the conclusion that Barros Basto's dismissal from the army was a matter of political and religious segregation on account of being Jewish. "Barros Basto was separated from the Army due to a general climate of animosity against him motivated by the fact of being a Jew" - can be read in the document that the LUSA news agency had access to.

In turn, the Resolution of the Assembly of the Republic n.º 119/2012, of 10–08, urged the government to undertake a symbolic reintegration of Barros Basto in the Army, posthumously, "by no means in a category lower than the person concerned would have been entitled to had he not been dismissed".

Isabel Ferreira Lopes, granddaughter of Barros Basto and Vice President of the Jewish Community of Porto stated to LUSA that after the rehabilitation of her grandfather's memory, the next step was the rehabilitation of Porto's synagogue: "In the year of the rehabilitation of the founder of the Jewish Community of Porto the synagogue shall as well be rehabilitated.”

== See also ==
- Kadoorie Synagogue
- Lisbon Synagogue
- Jewish Communities of Portugal
- History of the Jews in Portugal
- Crypto-Jews
- Ha-Lapid
