= Shanghai Yucai High School =

Location
- No.2001 HUYI Road; Shanghai, 201801

Information
- Established: 1901
- Principal: Mrs. Chen Qingyun
- Campus size: 18 hectares (44 acres)
- Website: http://www.yucai.sh.cn/miee/

Shanghai Yucai High School (上海市育才中学) is a public secondary school located in Shanghai, China.

This school requires that students devote 12 hours per day, nine hours before dinner and three hours afterwards, to complete homework assignments, including weekends.
