= Goodman Lipkind =

Rabbi Goodman Lipkind (1878–1973) was a London rabbi who later emigrated to New York City.

He wrote many articles for the Jewish Encyclopedia, and in Joseph Leftwich's biography of writer Israel Zangwill is mentioned as inspiration for the character of Rabbi Joseph Strelitski in Zangwill's novel Children of the Ghetto.

== Biography ==
Lipkind was born on 27 June 1878 in Whitechapel, London. His parents were John and Rebecca Lipkind.

On 13 June 1911 the Milwaukee Journal reported that United Hebrew Congregation, "the largest Hebrew congregation in the United States", in St Louis, had elected Lipkind, who was then at the Sinai congregation in Milwaukee, to succeed Henry J. Messing as its new Rabbi. Lipkind served at UHC from 1912 to 1914.

On 15 October 1915 The New York Times reported his marriage to Charlotte G Harris in Eighty-Sixth Street Temple where he was Rabbi.

He was rabbi of the Gates of Heaven temple in Schenectady, New York until 1926.

He died on 1 May 1973 at Long Beach, New York.
