= Ellis Kadoorie =

Hong Kong businessman (1865–1922)

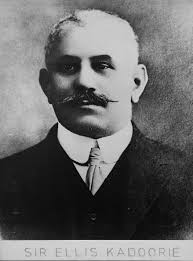

Sir Ellis Kadoorie CBE (1865–1922) was a Jewish businessman and philanthropist. He was a member of the wealthy Baghdadi Jewish Kadoorie family that has vast business interests in China.

== Biography ==
Kadoorie's brother was Elly, and his nephews were Lawrence and Horace. Kadoorie's family were originally Iraqi Jews from Baghdad who later migrated to Bombay, British India, in the late-19th century. His Iraqi Jewish father moved to British India before Ellis immigrated to Hong Kong.

In 1883, Kadoorie arrived in Hong Kong from Bombay, where he worked as an employee of David Sassoon & Sons., an Iraqi Jewish firm and also joined his brother Elly, who had arrived in the city in 1880. Later, the brothers started their own brokerage business. Over the course of their business career, Kadoorie and Elly made their fortune, achieving success with business interests in banking, rubber plantations, electric power generation, docks, real estate, and gaining a major share-holding in Hong Kong and Shanghai Hotels. In 1917, Kadoorie was knighted.

== Schools ==
In the 1910s, Sir Ellis founded several schools in China, among them are Sir Ellis Kadoorie School in Hong Kong, and Shanghai Yucai High School.

== Death ==
Sir Ellis died and was buried in Hong Kong on 24 February 1922. He is buried in the Jewish Cemetery.

According to his testament, he left £100,000 for the development of education in Mandatory Palestine. There was great rejoicing in the Zionist Organization; naturally, everyone assumed the money was intended for Jewish education. Herbert Samuel set up a committee to plan how the money would be spent. Only some time later was Kadoorie's will read carefully, and then it turned out that the beneficiary was not specifically the British administration in Palestine, but the British government in London; Kadoorie had granted it the choice of whether to invest in Palestine or Iraq. There was no indication in his will that the money was intended to be used for Hebrew education. In the ensuing commotion, Weizmann managed at least to obtain a decision that the sum be invested in Palestine.

Eventually, it was decided to build two separate agricultural schools in the region of Palestine: The Kadoorie Agricultural High School which was built in the Lower Galilee for the Jewish population, and another, now known as Palestine Technical University – Kadoorie, in Tulkarm for the Arab population.

Sir Ellis Kadoorie School is a primary school in Hong Kong founded in 1891 (as The Ellis Kadoorie School for Indians) and added a secondary school in 1980.

== See also ==
- Kadoorie family
- Sir Ellis Kadoorie Secondary School (West Kowloon)
- Sir Ellis Kadoorie (S) Primary School
