= Happy Valley Jewish Cemetery =

Cemetery in Hong Kong

Coordinates: 22.2669°N 114.1856°E

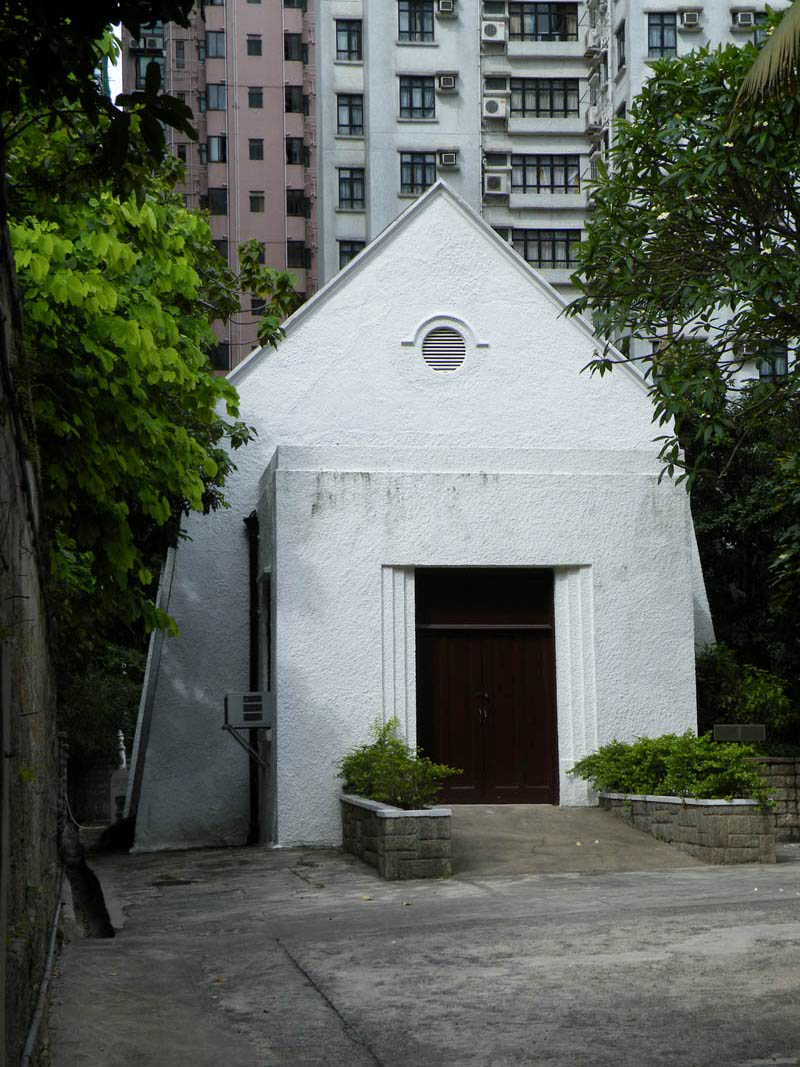
Chapel in Happy Valley Jewish Cemetery

Happy Valley Jewish Cemetery is the main Jewish cemetery in Happy Valley, Hong Kong. The cemetery is located on Shan Kwong Road and is managed by Jones Lang Lasalle Management Services.

== History ==
The burial ground was opened in 1855 by Reuben David Sassoon on former farmland acquired by his father David Sassoon of the Anglo-Jewish Sassoon family from the British Crown to serve the Jewish community in Hong Kong. Additional land was acquired in 1904 for space for a chapel and other buildings.

== Burial ==
There are over 300 graves including those of the Kadoorie family. The first burial took place in 1857. Also this cemetery are two war graves of World War II and one non-war service grave which are maintained by the Commonwealth War Graves Commission.

== See also ==
- List of cemeteries in Hong Kong
