= Horace Kadoorie =

Hong Kong philanthropist (1902–1995)

- הוראס כדורי
- Born: 28 September 1902
- Died: 22 April 1995 (aged 92)
- Occupations: Industrialist, hotelier, and philanthropist

Sir Horace Kadoorie, CBE (28 September 1902 – 22 April 1995) was an industrialist, hotelier, and philanthropist. He was a member of the Kadoorie family.

== Early life and education ==
In 1913–14, he spent a year at Clifton College in Bristol, England, and was a member of Polacks House, a boarding house solely for Jewish boys at Clifton.

== Personal life ==
His father was Sir Elly Kadoorie, and his uncle, Sir Ellis Kadoorie. His family were originally Iraqi Jews from Baghdad who later migrated to Bombay, British India, in the mid-18th century. Kadoorie and his brother, Sir Lawrence Kadoorie, worked for Victor Sassoon during the 1920s and 1930s, and managed his Shanghai hotel. They also worked for their father, the industrialist Sir Elly Kadoorie.

He and his brother formed an agricultural aid organisation that in the 1960s helped hundreds of thousands of peasants in rural areas of Hong Kong to become independent farmers. Kadoorie and his brother, Lawrence, both received the Magsaysay Award for public service in 1962.

They were also appointed Chevaliers of the Légion d'honneur by the French government. The Nepal Government awarded him one of its highest honours, the Gorkha Dakshin Bahu (First Class) Award, for his work in helping Gurkha soldiers readjust to rural life after leaving the British military. Sir Horace Kadoorie died in Hong Kong on 22 April 1995.

Kadoorie died on April 22, 1995, in Hong Kong. He was buried in the Jewish Cemetery in Happy Valley, Hong Kong.

== Philanthropy ==
Among Sir Horace's philanthropies was a school that became a haven for Jewish refugee children in the Shanghai ghetto. He found the Shanghai Jewish Youth Association in 1937. Later, in 1951, he co-founded the Kadoorie Agricultural Aid Association (KAAA) with his brother, Lawrence.
