= Palestine Technical University – Kadoorie =

Agricultural school in Tulkarm, Palestine

Coordinates: 32°19′08.34″N 35°01′43.30″E

- جامعة فلسطين التقنية - خضوري
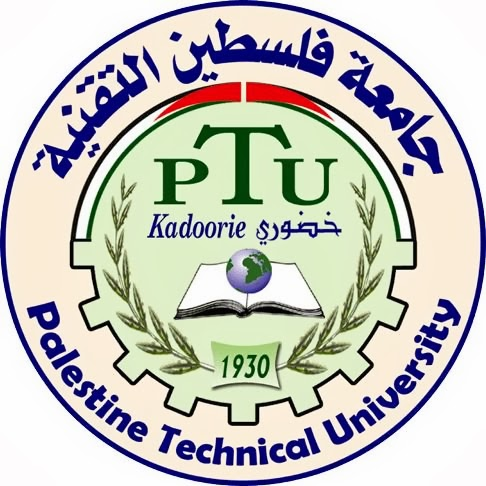
- Former name: Tulkarm Community College
- Established: 1930
- Rector: Nouraddin Aburob
- Location: Tulkarm, State of Palestine
- Website: ptuk.edu.ps

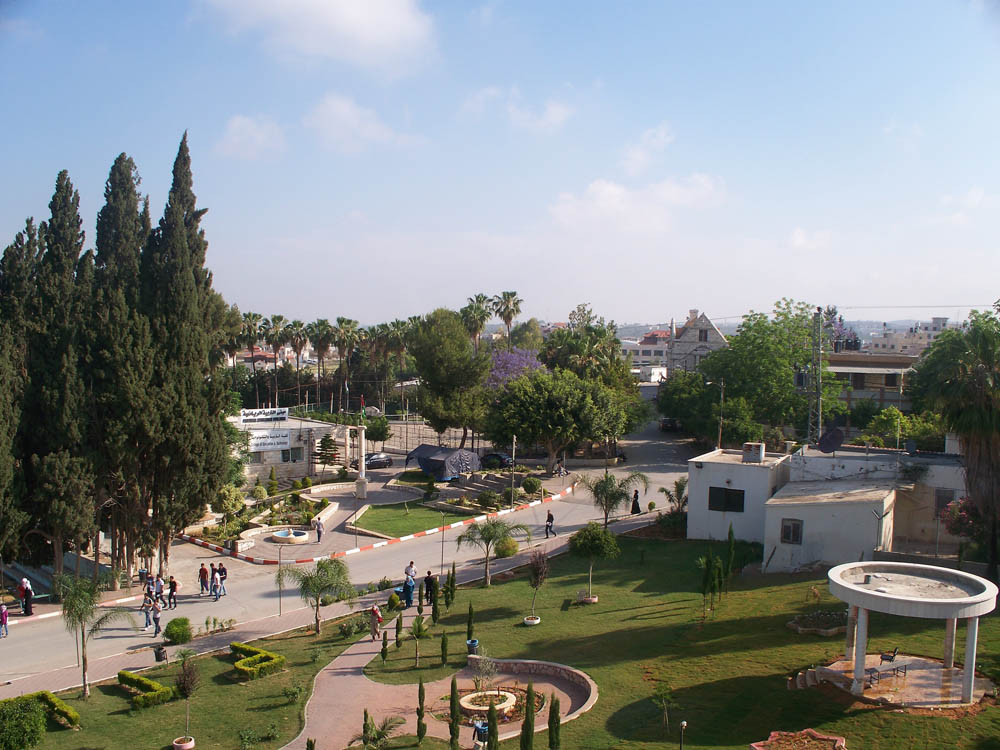
A view of the campus

Palestine Technical University – Kadoorie (formerly known as Tulkarm Community College) is an agricultural college located in Tulkarm, in the northern West Bank, Palestine. The college was inaugurated in 1930 after the British Government had received a bequest from the Iraqi-born Jewish philanthropist Sir Ellis Kadoorie. The college was named in his honour and still bears his name.

== History ==
=== Foundation and British Mandate years ===
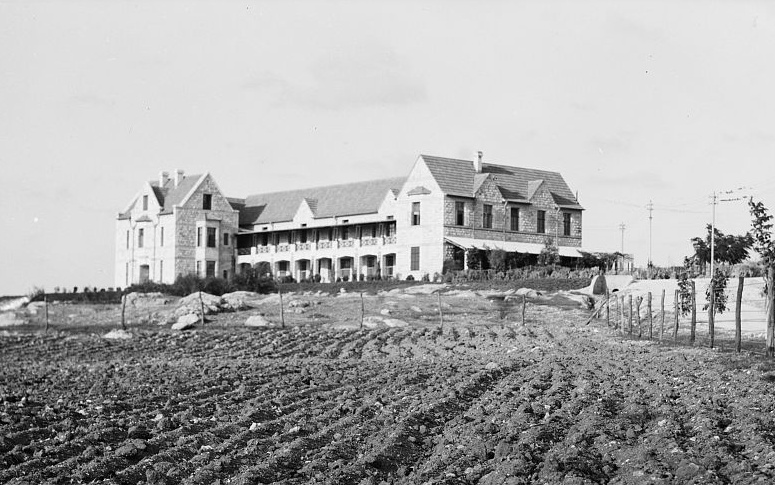
The agricultural school in the 1930s

Kadoorie is one of two of agricultural schools founded as agricultural schools by the British during the Mandatory Palestine period with contributions from a bequest of the Iraqi-born Jewish philanthropist Sir Ellis Kadoorie, who died in the British colony of Hong Kong in 1922. Kadoorie contributed 1,000,000 British Pounds. However, when Kadoorie's testament was read it became clear that the Yishuv would not inherit the money - the government of Britain would - and that Kadoorie ordered in his testament to invest the money either in Palestine or in Iraq. Initially an agricultural school was built in Tulkarm. This opened in 1930 with an English principal; the school had the character of a British colonial institution. Soon after many institutions and leaders of the Yishuv made a petition to Herbert Samuel for the establishment of a Jewish school. The British authorities endorsed the idea of a Palestinian Jewish agricultural school similar to the Palestinian Arab school in Tulkarm. The foundations for the second school were laid down in 1931 at Um Jabal, next to the village of Kfar Tavor and the Jewish Kadoorie Agricultural High School was opened in 1933. Both school buildings were designed by British architect Austen Harrison, chief architect of the Public Works Department of British Mandatory Palestine's government.

The Agricultural college in Tulkarm came under the authority of the Government of the British Mandate and was supervised by the Department of Agriculture. In addition to the agricultural land the college included cattle, sheep and chicken farms. The agricultural school played an important role in providing the Palestinian agricultural sector with technicians in various fields of agriculture. Due to the position of the 1948 Armistice line the college lost most of its agricultural land in the 1948 Arab–Israeli War.

=== Jordanian period ===
During the period of Jordanian administration, the agricultural school was transformed into the Technical Agricultural Institute, offering an associate degree (diploma) in all agricultural sciences until 1967.

=== 1967 and occupation, autonomy, Intifada ===
After the 1967 Six-Day War the importance of the college to agriculture in the West Bank declined, with deterioration of the farm buildings. The college was then transformed from an agricultural-based institute to a college with an industrial-based emphasis.

At the beginning of the peace process and following the establishment of the Palestinian National Authority (PNA), there was a rejuvenation of the agricultural aspect of the college, through both governmental and non-governmental funding. An Italian organization in cooperation with the Palestinian Ministry of Agriculture (MOA) and the Land Research Centre (LRC) set about repairing the dilapidated cattle farm. This initiative also encompassed the establishment of an information and agricultural advisory centre.

As of 2002, during the Second Intifada, the routine of the Kadoorie Institute has suffered under the Israeli occupation of the West Bank, but the staff of the institute have adapted techniques to get around curfews enabling the Kadoorie Institute to produce a high grade of student despite the many interruptions.

By 2007, the Kadoorie family had funded the construction of a new science wing for the college.

=== Upgrade to university status 2007 ===
In early 2007, the college was granted the status of a university. It was accredited officially on 30 August 2007 as Palestine Technical University – Kadoorie. This was announced officially by its dean and acting president, Dr. Mutasim Babaa', on September 1, 2007. Parts of the Kadoorie College campus is now affiliated to the An-Najah National University in Nablus. This part includes a faculty of agriculture and a faculty of veterinarian medicine. With a grant from the Palestinian Agricultural Relief Committees, a pilot project for the design, construction and operation of a biogas digester was erected at Kadoorie College, with the Energy Research Centre (ERC) of An-Najah providing technical assistance, supervision and valuation of results.
