= Kadoorie Agricultural High School =

- כפר הנוער החקלאי כדורי
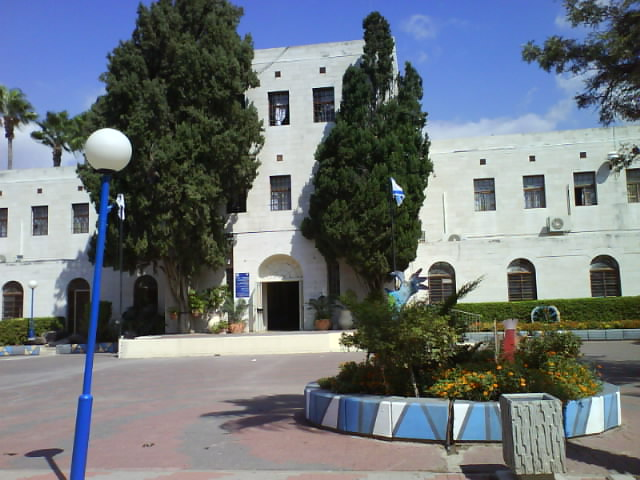

Location
- Israel; 32°42′22″N 35°24′10″E

Information
- Established: 1933
- Grades: 7–12
- Website: school.kadoorie.org.il

Kadoorie Agricultural High School, sometimes spelled "Kadouri" or "Kaduri", is an agricultural school and youth village in Israel situated next to Mount Tabor in the Lower Galilee, 2 kilometres (1.2 mi) north of Kfar Tavor. Founded in 1933, it had a population of 148 in 2024.

== History ==
Kadoorie is one of two agricultural schools founded during the British Mandate of Palestine. In his will, the British Jewish philanthropist, Sir Ellis Kadoorie donated one million British pounds to be invested in the development of Palestine. Herbert Samuel established a committee to determine how to use the money. Two agricultural schools named after Kadoorie were built with these funds, one for Arabs and one for Jews. The Khodori Institute in Tulkarm was founded in 1930, and the Kadoorie agricultural school, near Kfar Tavor, was founded in 1933. The Kadoorie agricultural school was reputed to be one of the best schools during the British Mandate period.

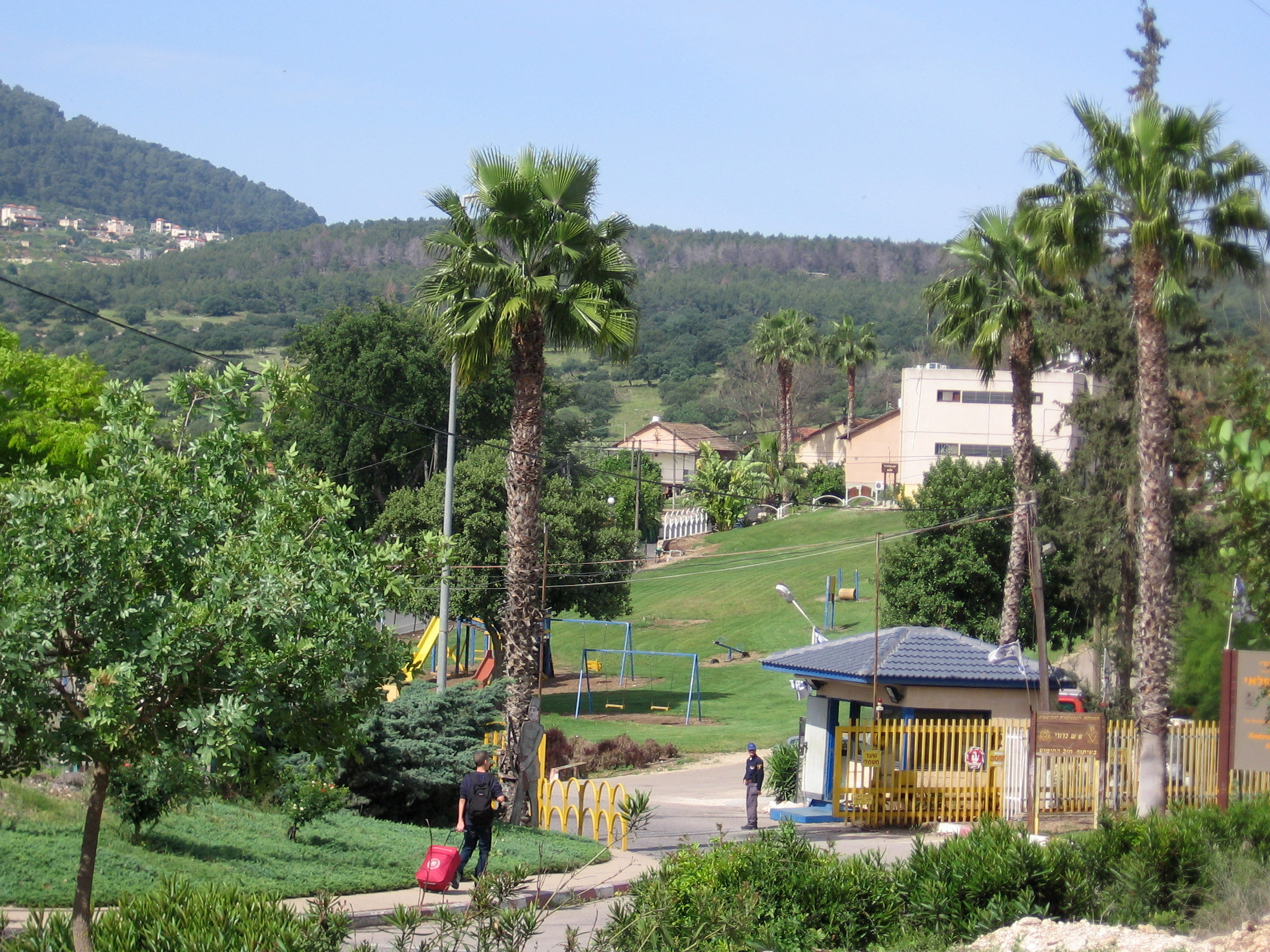
Grounds of Kadoorie Agricultural High School, 2011

The main educational goal was to prepare students for advanced studies in Europe. The first principal was Shalom Tzemach, who led the "honour code examinations" (exams without the attendance of teachers) and concentrated in the subjects of agriculture and security. The second principal was Nathan Fiat, who served as principal from 1937 to 1959—the legendary principal that became a model to his students.

The school's nickname during that period was "the monastery", due to the place being so secluded and attendance restricted to boys. During the period of the 1948 Arab–Israeli War many of the school's students and graduates fought in the Palmach brigades and were an honorable part of its chain of the command. Many of the graduates of Kadoorie school took active part in agricultural settlement throughout the country.

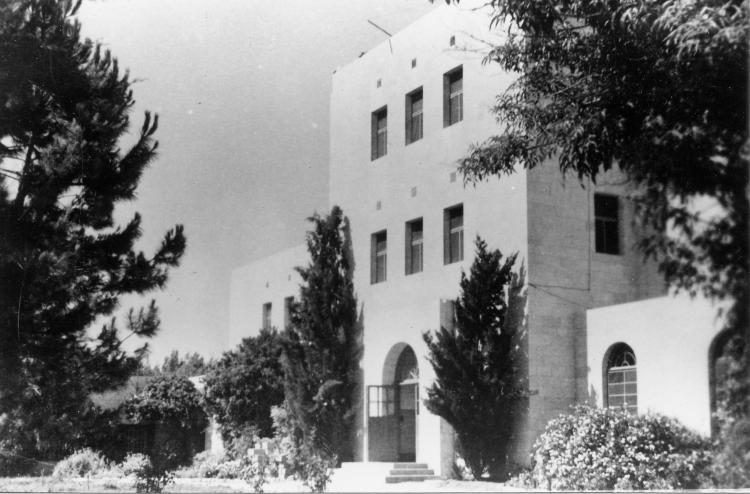
Kadoori Agricultural School, 1948

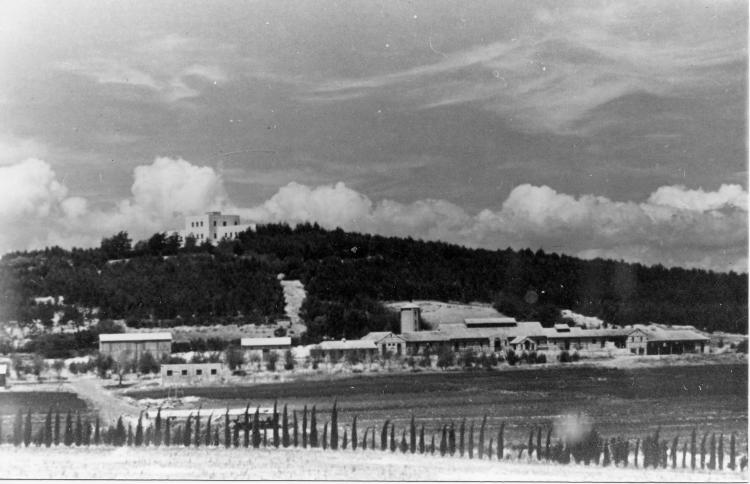
Kadoorie Agricultural School as seen from Mount Tabor. 1948

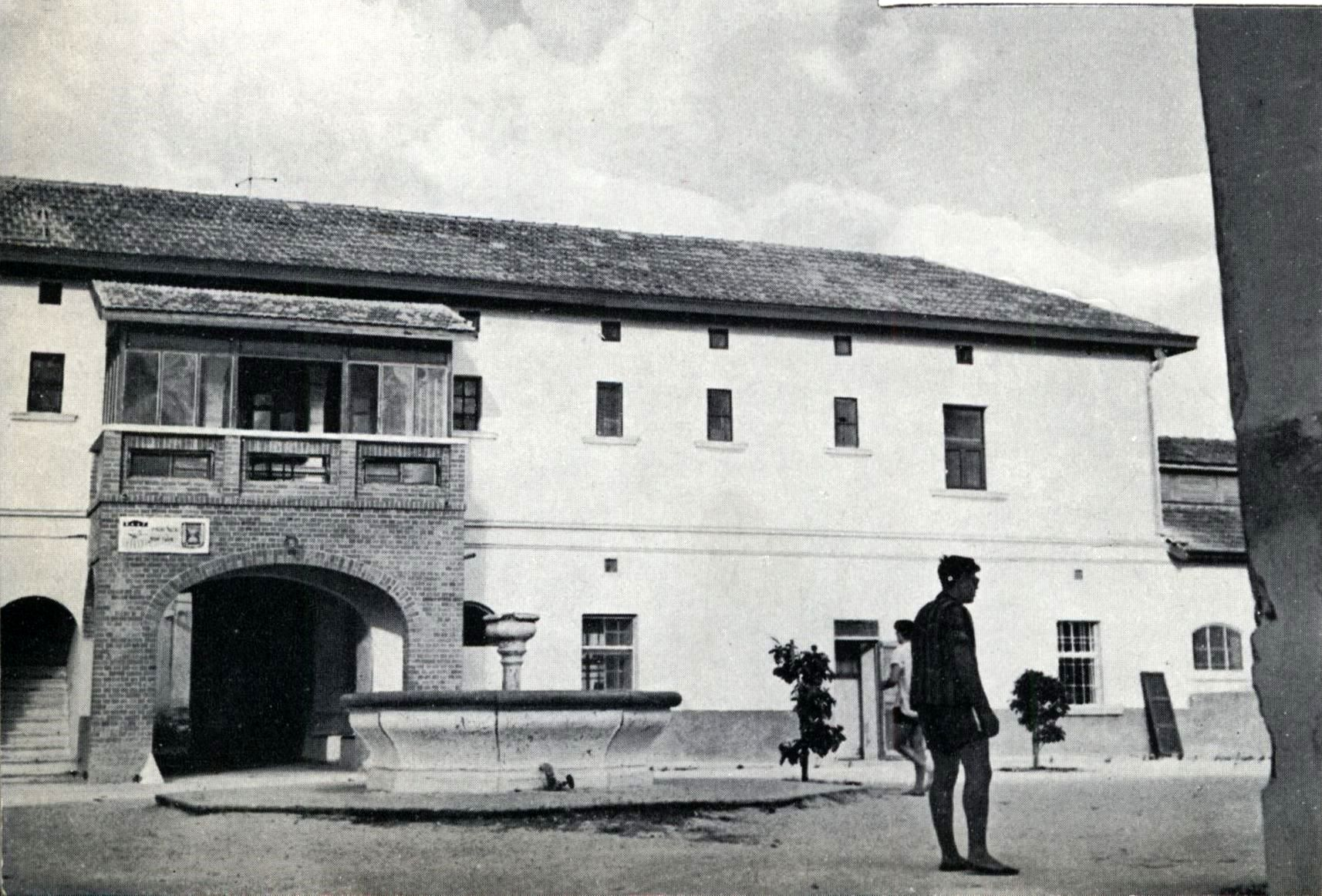
Old historic building, renovated in 1956

== Today ==
In 1975, the school became a regional school, although the boarding school is still active. Today over 1,500 students are enrolled in the school: 200 students from all over Israel in the boarding school, and the rest students of the Lower Galilee area. In addition, the school operates a training farm and a technological college.

== Notable alumni ==
- Yitzhak Rabin (1922–1995), Israeli Prime Minister and Nobel Peace Prize laureate
- Yigal Allon (1918–1980), politician, commander of the Palmach, and IDF general
- Haim Gouri (born 1923), poet, novelist, journalist, and documentary filmmaker
- Eli Yatzpan (born 1965), television host and comedian
- Karl Linn (1923–2005), American landscape architect, psychologist, educator, and community activist
- Hananya Naftali (born 1995), pro-Israel social media influencer
