= Kadoorie family =

Hong Kong family of businesspersons

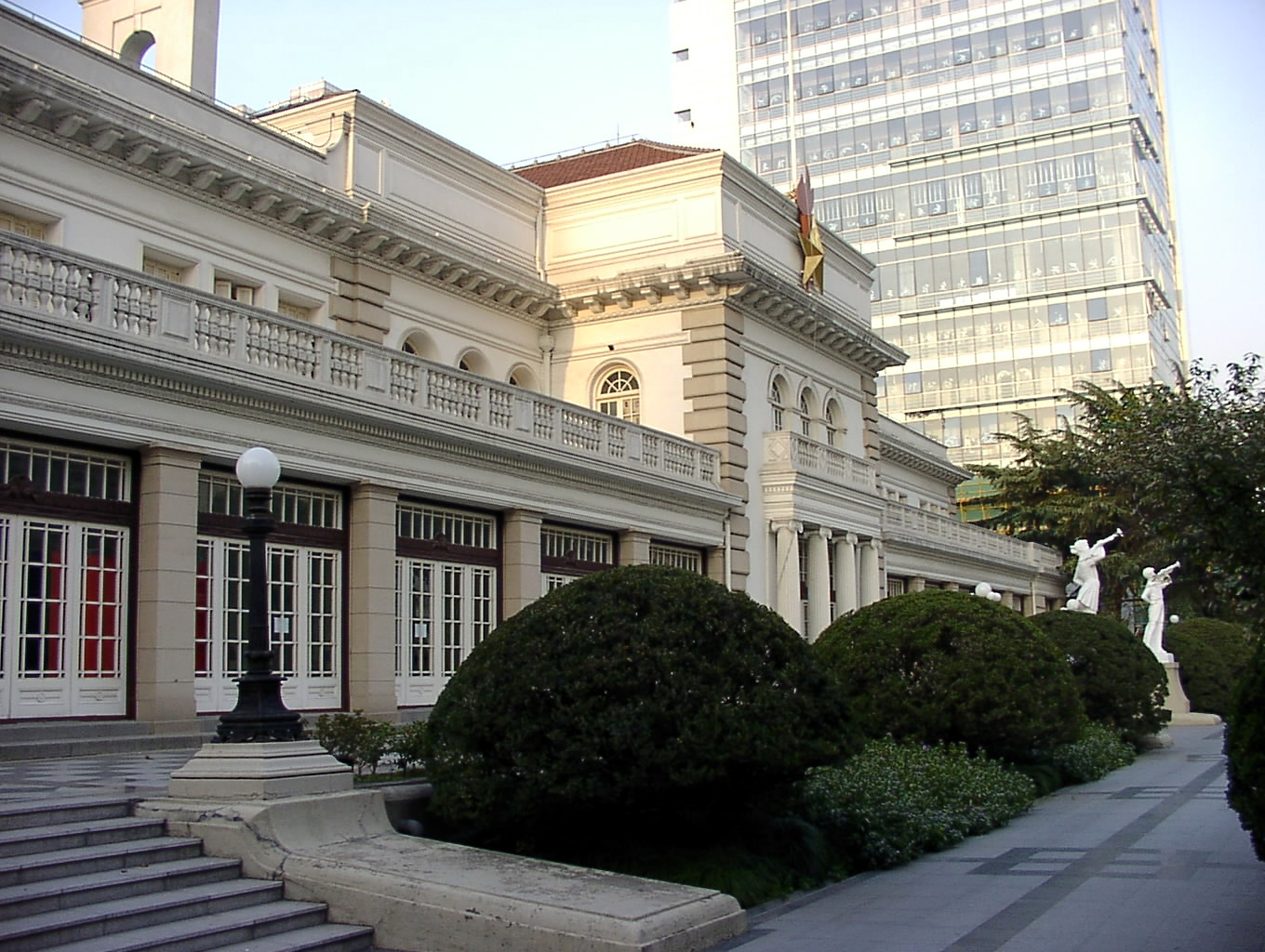
"Marble Hall", formerly a Kadoorie family mansion in Shanghai

The Kadoorie family (Hebrew: כדורי, Arabic: خضوري, Judeo-Arabic: כצׄורי) is a wealthy Hong Kong-based family, originally Iraqi Jews from Baghdad in Iraq. From the mid-18th century, the family was established in Mumbai (then known as Bombay), becoming one of the wealthiest families in Asia. Their businesses were subsequently centered in Shanghai from the mid-19th century, and then in Hong Kong from the 20th century onwards. They fled to Hong Kong after the communist takeover of China in 1949. The Kadoorie family has been described as the wealthiest non-ethnic Chinese family in Hong Kong.

The Kadoorie family has maintained a prominent position in commerce and society in Southeast Asia despite the effects of World War II and the rise of Communist rule in China. The family has played a significant role in the economic development of the southeastern coast of China and Hong Kong.

== Notable family members ==
The Kadoorie family has included a number of notable individuals:

- Ellis Kadoorie (1865–1922), philanthropist and businessman
- Elly Kadoorie (1867–1944), philanthropist and businessman; married Laura Mocatta, 3 children
  - Lawrence Kadoorie, Baron Kadoorie, CBE (1899–1993), industrialist, hotelier, and philanthropist; married Muriel Gubbay in 1938, 2 children
    - Rita Laura McAulay, married Scottish industrialist Ronald McAulay, 1 child
      - Andrew McAulay (born 1967)
    - Michael Kadoorie (born 1941), businessman and philanthropist; married Cuban-American Betty Tamayo, 3 children
      - Bettina Kadoorie
      - Natalie Louise Kadoorie (born 1986), married to Diego Alejandro Gonzalez Morales
      - Philip Lawrence Kadoorie (born 1992)
  - Victor Kadoorie (1900–1900)
  - Horace Kadoorie (1902–1995), industrialist, hotelier, and philanthropist
- Reuben Ezekiel Kadoorie, married Catherine Lee Wai-Ying, 1 child
  - Rosa Kadoorie was married to American adventurer Hilaire du Berrier.

== Philanthropy ==
In the 1990s, the Kadoorie family donated US$500,000 for the construction of the new Shanghai Museum.

During the 1961 drought in Hong Kong, the Kadoorie family donated cement and pipes to the Yim Tin Tsai villagers, as well as contributing money and effort to lay the water mains delivering water from Mud Bay to Yim Tin Tsai island.

The Kadoorie Foundation supports two professorial chairs at the University of Oxford (the Kadoorie Professorship of Trauma Rehabilitation and the Kadoorie Associate Professorship of Emergency Medicine), as well as the Kadoorie Centre for Critical Care Research and Education, which is based at the John Radcliffe Hospital in Oxford. These initiatives are all aimed at improving the quality of trauma, emergency, and critical care globally.

== Enterprises ==
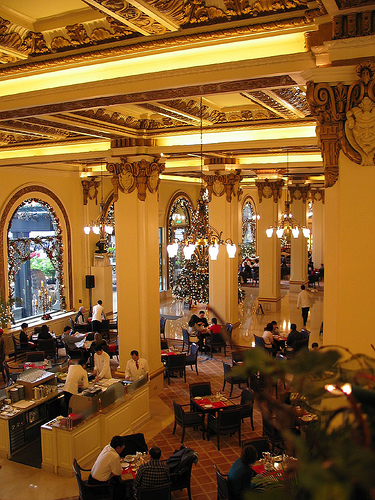
The Peninsula in Hong Kong

Enterprises founded by the family include:

- CLP Group
- Hongkong and Shanghai Hotels
  - The Peninsula Hotels

== See also ==
- Kadoorie Agricultural High School
- Palestine Technical University – Kadoorie
- Kadoorie Farm and Botanic Garden
- Shanghai Ghetto
