= Elly Kadoorie =

British businessman and philanthropist (1867–1944)

The Honourable Sir Elly Kadoorie KBE

Chairman of the Hongkong and Shanghai Hotels

Personal details
- Born: 1867 Baghdad
- Died: 2 August 1944 (aged 77)
- Spouse: Laura Kadoorie (b.1866, d.1919)
- Relations: Ellis Kadoorie (brother, 1865–1922); Kadoorie family
- Children: Lawrence Kadoorie (1899–1993); Victor Kadoorie (1900–1900); Horace Kadoorie (1902–1995)

Sir Eleazer "Elly" Silas Kadoorie KBE (1867 – February 8, 1944) was a Baghdadi-born Jewish businessman and philanthropist active in Shanghai and Hong Kong. He was a member of the wealthy Kadoorie family that has large business interests in the Far East.

== Biography ==
His family were originally Iraqi Jews from Baghdad who later migrated to Bombay (British Raj), in the late 19th-century. His brother was Sir Ellis Kadoorie, and his sons were Sir Lawrence Kadoorie and Sir Horace Kadoorie.

Elly Kadoorie arrived in Shanghai from Bombay in 1880 as an employee of the Baghdadi Jewish firm David Sassoon & Sons. Within a few years he had accumulated large sums of money and had gone into business on his own account, with companies in both Shanghai and Hong Kong. He became the largest shareholder when China Light & Power was restructured in early 20th century. Over the next two decades, the Kadoorie brothers made their fortunes, achieving success in banking, rubber plantations, electric power utilities and real estate and gaining a major shareholding in Hong Kong Hotels Limited.

Kadoorie was made an Honorary Knight Commander of the Order of the British Empire in the 1926 Birthday Honours. He was given the Order of the Brilliant Jade by the Chinese government. He became a naturalised British citizen the following year.

In 1942, Kadoorie was taken from his home in Shanghai and interned in a Japanese prison camp for foreign civilians. He died in prison on February 8, 1944.

Sir Elly Kadoorie's grave and that of his wife Laura (née Mocatta), Lady Kadoorie, are located in the Song Qingling Memorial Park near Hongqiao Road, Shanghai, and are accessible to visitors. Theirs are amongst only four Jewish tombstones in Shanghai which remained intact and were not destroyed during the Cultural Revolution.
