= Peninsula Hotel =

Peninsula Hotel may refer to:

- The Peninsula Hotels, a chain of luxury properties operated by Hongkong and Shanghai Hotels
  - The Peninsula Beijing
  - The Peninsula Shanghai
  - The Peninsula Paris
  - The Peninsula Hong Kong
  - The Peninsula Tokyo
  - The Peninsula Manila
  - The Peninsula Bangkok
  - The Peninsula Beverly Hills
  - The Peninsula Chicago
  - The Peninsula New York
- Peninsula Hotel, Singapore, a hotel in Singapore
