= The Peninsula =

The Peninsula may refer to:

== Places ==
=== United Kingdom ===
- The Peninsula, Durham, the historic centre of Durham, England

=== United States ===
- The Peninsula at St. Johns Center, a building in Jacksonville, Florida
- The San Francisco Peninsula, in Northern California
- The Monterey Peninsula, in Central California
- The Virginia Peninsula, of southeastern Virginia

== Hotel ==
- The Peninsula Hotels, a chain of luxury hotels founded in 1928
  - The Peninsula Hong Kong
  - The Peninsula New York
  - The Peninsula Beijing
  - The Peninsula Bangkok
  - The Peninsula Tokyo
  - The Peninsula Paris
  - The Peninsula London

== Newspaper ==
- The Peninsula (newspaper), daily English language newspaper published in Qatar

== See also ==
- Peninsula (disambiguation)
