= The Peninsula Beijing =

Luxury hotel in Beijing, China

- 王府半岛酒店
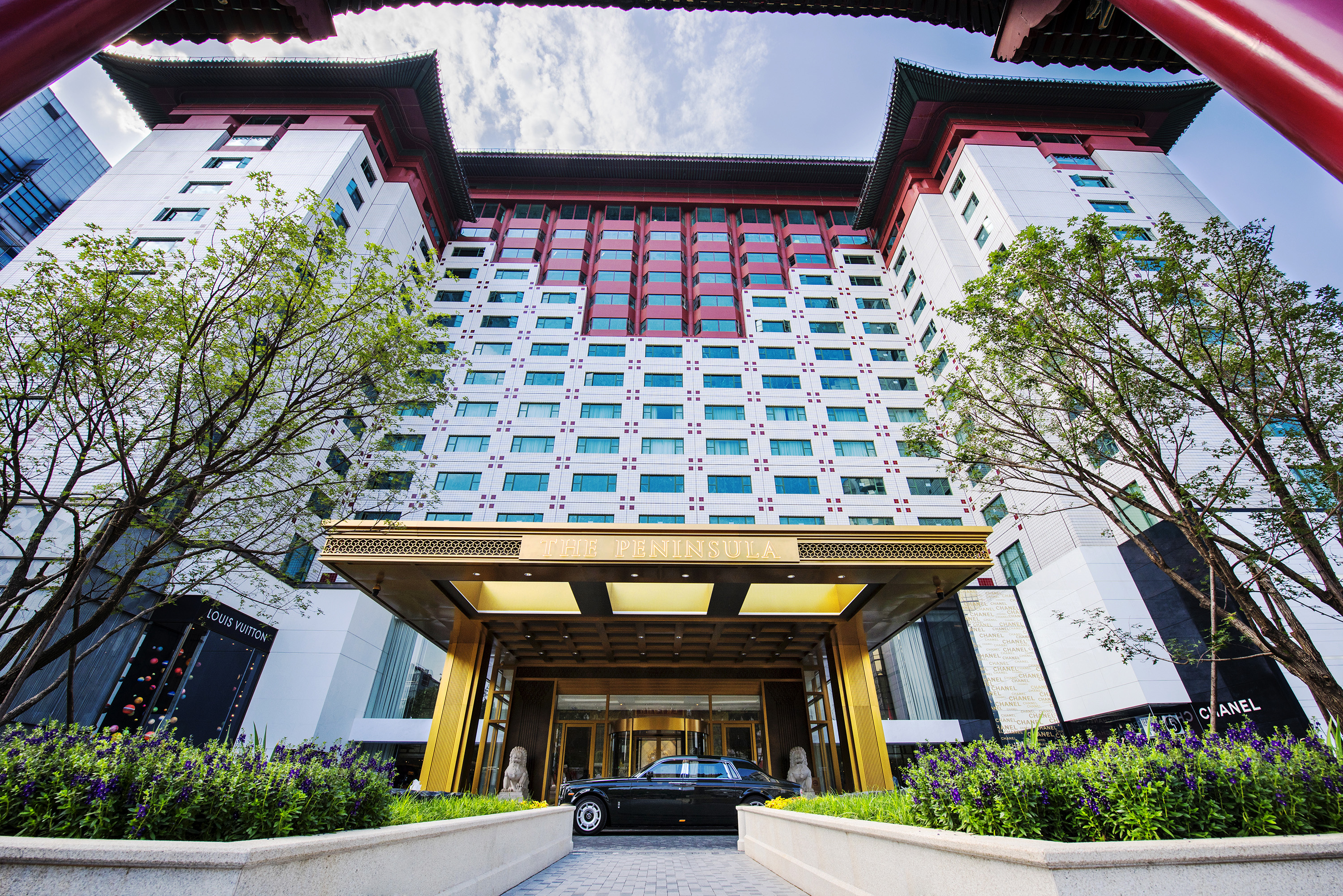
- The hotel façade
- Interactive map of the The Peninsula Beijing area
- Former names: The Palace Hotel, The Peninsula Palace Hotel

General information
- Location: 8 Goldfish Lane, Wangfujing, Beijing, 100006
- Coordinates: 39.9135567°N 116.4101712°E
- Opened: 1989
- Owner: Hongkong and Shanghai Hotels

Technical details
- Floor count: 14

Other information
- Number of rooms: 230
- Number of restaurants: 3

Website
- www.peninsula.com/en/beijing/5-star-luxury-hotel-wangfujing

The Peninsula Beijing (Chinese: 王府半岛酒店; Chinese: 王府半島酒店; pinyin: Wángfǔ Bàndǎo Jiǔdiàn) is a 5-star luxury hotel in Beijing. It was China's first luxury hotel when it opened as The Palace Hotel in 1989. The Peninsula Hotels, part of the Hong Kong And Shanghai Hotels Group, assumed management of the hotel in 1996 and renamed it The Peninsula Beijing in 2006. In 2017, the hotel completed a US $123 million renovation, turning into an all-suite hotel.

== History ==
=== Early history of the site ===
The Peninsula Beijing is located on Goldfish Lane (Jinyu hutong) in Beijing's historic Wangfujing area.

=== The Palace Hotel ===
In May 1986, the foundations were laid for The Palace Hotel, the original name of The Peninsula Beijing. By late 1987, the hotel building designed by architect K.Y. Cheung had acquired its iconic Chinese hip-and-gable roof covered in traditional glazed roof tiles, which remains a signature feature in the area today. After three years of construction, the hotel opened in May 1989. The hotel was constructed and initially owned by the People's Liberation Army General Staff Department, who transferred their shares to China Everbright Group in 1999.

The first stores in Mainland China for Louis Vuitton, Chanel and Hermès opened in the hotel's shopping arcade during the 1990s.

=== The Peninsula Beijing ===
The Peninsula Hotels assumed management of The Palace Hotel in 1996, and the following year the hotel undertook its first renovation. The guest rooms were redesigned to include proprietary in-room technology that was, at the time, unique for a hotel in Beijing.

In September 2003, The Palace Hotel was renamed The Peninsula Palace Beijing. In 2006, it became The Peninsula Beijing, following the completion of a four-year phased renovation from 2000 - 2004.

=== Major renovation ===
In 2016, 27 years after its original opening, The Peninsula Beijing embarked upon an RMB890 million (US$123 million) landmark renovation. The renovation doubled the size of its rooms and renovated all its public spaces. The number of units was reduced from 525 to 230.

== Prominent visitors ==
Since its opening in 1989, The Peninsula Beijing has hosted a range of prominent visitors. General Yang Dezhi visited the hotel's construction site in 1986, as the hotel was constructed by what was then known as the People's Liberation Army General Staff Department. In 1990, Yang Shangkun, then the President of China visited the hotel for an inspection.

== See also ==
- The Peninsula Hong Kong
- The Peninsula Shanghai
- The Peninsula Tokyo
- The Peninsula Paris
- The Peninsula New York
- The Peninsula Chicago
- The Peninsula Beverly Hills
- The Peninsula Manila
- The Peninsula Bangkok
