= Peninsula (disambiguation) =

A peninsula is a piece of land bordered by water on three sides.

Peninsula may also refer to:

- Peninsula Campaign of the American Civil War
- Peninsular War of 1808
- Peninsula Shield Force, a military alliance of the Middle East
- Peninsula, Ohio, a village in Summit County, Ohio
- Peninsula Township, Michigan, in Grand Traverse County
- The Peninsula Hotels, a chain of luxury hotels founded in 1928
- Peninsula (film), a 2020 South Korean zombie film by Yeon Sang-ho
- Peninsula (electorate), a former electorate in Otago, New Zealand
- Peninsular Spain, the part of the nation on the European mainland
- "Peninsula", a song by Dinosaur Pile-Up from the album Nature Nurture

== See also ==
- List of peninsulas
- The Peninsula (disambiguation)
