= 2018 Palanca Awards =

Annual Philippine literary award

68th Palanca Awards
- Date: October 5, 2018
- Location: The Peninsula Manila, Makati, Philippines

The 68th Don Carlos Palanca Memorial Awards for Literature was held on October 5, 2018, at The Peninsula Manila in Makati to commemorate the memory of Don Carlos Palanca Sr. through an endeavor that would promote education and culture in the country. A total of 54 writers, 28 of which were first-time awardees, were chosen as this year's batch of winners. Alfred “Krip” Yuson was Guest of Honor and Speaker at this year's awarding ceremony.

LIST OF WINNERS

The 2018 winners are divided into four categories:

== English Division ==
=== Short Story ===
- First Prize: Joe Bert Lazarte, “Describe the Rapture”
- Second Prize: Francis Paolo M. Quina, “Pigs”
- Third Prize: Matthew Jacob F. Ramos, “The Final Bullet”

=== Short Story for Children ===
- First Prize: No Winner
- Second Prize: No Winner
- Third Prize: Maryrose Jairene Cruz-Eusebio, “I have Two Mothers”

=== Essay ===
- First Prize: Jefry Canoy, “Buhay Pa Kami: Dispatches from Marawi”
- Second Prize: Ronnie E. Baticulon, “Some Days You Can’t Save Them All”
- Third Prize: Chuck D. Smith, “Origin Story”

=== Poetry ===
- First Prize: Rodrigo V. Dela Peña Jr., “Self-portrait with Plastic Bag”
- Second Prize: Shane Carreon, “The Gods who Dissolved Under Our Tongues and Other Poems”
- Third Prize: Jose Luis B. Pablo, “To Desire in Liturgy”

=== Poetry Written for Children ===
- First Prize: Maria Amparo Nolasco Warren, “Lola Elina Maria’s Savory-Sweet Cookbook of Poetry”
- Second Prize: Sigrid Marianne P. Gayangos, “Of Monsters, Math and Magic”
- Third Prize: Roselle Eloise B. Bunayog, “Brave, Undying Warriors”

=== One-Act Play ===
- First Prize: Katrina M. Bonillo, "Burying Mamang in Sugar"
- Second Prize: Joe Bert Lazarte, "Senator Pancho Aunor’s Blue Balls of Despair and Disillusionment"
- Third Prize: Luciano Sonny O. Valencia, "Leavings"

=== Full-Length play ===
- First Prize: Beryl Andrea P. Delicana, "Mango Tree"
- Second Prize: Patrick James M. Valera, "Symphony"
- Third Prize: Dominique La Victoria, "Toward the Fires of Revolution"

== Filipino Division ==
=== Maikling Kwento ===
- First Prize: Eugene C. Soyosa, “Gina”
- Second Prize: Andrew A. Estacio, “Ang Kanonisasyon ng mga Santa Santino”
- Third Prize: Luna Sicat Cleto, “Tatlong Proposisyon ng Puting Hangin”

=== Maikling Kwentong Pambata ===
- First Prize: Jerwin Eileen G.C. Tarnate, "Ang Higad at ang Paru-paro"
- Second Prize: Eugene Y. Evasco, "Siyap ng Isang Sisiw"
- Third Prize: Early Sol A. Gadong, “Maraming-Maraming-Marami”

=== Sanaysay ===
- First Prize: Gil A. Dulon Amoral Jr., “Ang Siyensya Subalit May Boses Din Ang Mga Maso”
- Second Prize: Adelma L. Salvador, “Kambak-kambak”
- Third Prize: Iza Maria G. Reyes, “Hindi Ako Dalisay”

=== Tula ===
- First Prize: Paul Alcoseba Castillo, “Luna’t Lunas”
- Second Prize: Mark Anthony S. Angeles, “Ang Babae sa Balangiga at iba pang Tula”
- Third Prize: Noel Galon, “Ang Bata sa Panahon ng Ligalig: Mga Tula sa loob at labas ng Bayan ng San Diego”

=== Tulang Pambata ===
- First Prize: Paterno B. Baloloy Jr, “Paumanhin ng Kuting”
- Second Prize: Will P. Ortiz, “Himbing na Kuting at iba pang Tula sa Ilalim ng Araw”
- Third Prize: Noel P. Tuazon, “Klik Madyik”

=== Dulang may Isang Yugto ===
- First Prize: Michelle Josephine G. Rivera, "Kaharian ng Pinto"
- Second Prize: Maynard Gonzales Manansala, "Tao Po"
- Third Prize: Allan B. Lopez, "River Lethe"

=== Dulang Ganap ang Haba ===
- First Prize: No Winner
- Second Prize: No Winner
- Third Prize: Rolin Cadallo Obina San Nicolas, "Ang Sarsuwela"

=== Dulang Pampelikula ===
- First Prize: James Ladioray, "11 Septembers"
- Second Prize: Arden Rod B. Condez, "John Denver Trending"
- Third Prize: Andrian M. Legaspi, "Pandanggo sa Hukay"

== Regional Division ==
=== Short Story [Cebuano] ===
- First Prize: Januar E. Yap, “Baradero”
- Second Prize: Dave T. Pregoner, “Sunog”
- Third prize: Leoncio P. Deriada, “Dili Baya Ko Bugoy”

=== Short Story [Hiligaynon] ===
- First Prize: Early Sol A. Gadong, “Sa Lum-ok Sang Imo Suso”
- Second Prize: Alice Tan Gonzales, “Haya”
- Third Prize: Dulce Maria V. Deriada, “Candelaria”

=== Short Story [Iluko] ===
- First Prize: Ariel Sotelo, “Tabag Gasanggasat”
- Second Prize: Paul Blanco Zafaralla, “Sarming”
- Third Prize: Jaime M. Agpalo Jr., “Nakakidem-a-Simumulagat”

== Kabataan Division ==
=== Kabataan Essay ===
- First Prize: Floriane T. Taruc, “Worlds Behind Words”
- Second Prize: Jaz Varon Villanueva, “Boundless”
- Third Prize: Jana Gillian Ang, “A Passage to Reading”

=== Kabataan Sanaysay ===
- First Prize: Jack Lorenz Acebedo Rivera, “Paglaya Mula sa Pagtakas”
- Second Prize: Jacob Renz R. Ambrocio, “Sino ang Lumansag sa Lunday ni Lola Basyang?”
- Third Prize: Maria Jamaica S. Columbres, “Gulugod sa Pagsibol ng Binhi”
