= 2015 Palanca Awards =

Philippine literary award

65th Palanca Awards
- Date: September 1, 2015
- Location: The Peninsula Manila, Makati, Philippines

The 65th Don Carlos Palanca Memorial Awards for Literature was held on September 1, 2015, at The Peninsula Manila in Makati to commemorate the memory of Don Carlos Palanca Sr. through an endeavor that would promote education and culture in the country. Out of 895 entries, only 57 Filipino literary writers and artists emerged as victors. Dr. Gemino H. Abad [soon to be declared National Artist for Literature] was guest of honor and speaker at this year's awarding ceremony.

The 2015 winners are divided into four categories:

== English Division ==
=== Novel ===
- Grand Prize: Victorette Joy Z. Campilan, All My Lonely Islands

=== Short Story ===
- First Prize: Alexis A. L. Abola, "Phallic Symbols"
- Second Prize: Maria Carmen G. Aquino Sarmiento, "The Backroom Angels Buggaloo"
- Third Prize: Hammed Q. Bolotaolo, "The Storyteller"

=== Short Story for Children ===
- First Prize: Raymond G. Falgui, "Monster Rescue: A Children’s Story for Adult Readers"
- Second Prize: Victoria Estrella C. Bravo, "The Bear"
- Third Prize: Jonathan R. Guillermo, "The Three Questions of Tarongoy"

=== Poetry ===
- First Prize: Charisse-Fuchsia A. Paderna, "An Abundance of Selves"
- Second Prize: Arkaye Kierulf, "There Are No Monsters"
- Third Prize: Rodrigo V. Dela Peña Jr., "Aria and Trumpet Flourish"

=== Poetry Written for Children ===
- First Prize: Peter Solis Nery, "The Rainbow Collection"
- Second Prize: Patricia Celina A. Ngo, "Ordinary Adventures"
- Third Prize: Elyrah L. Salanga-Torralba, "The Cockroach’s Prayer"

=== Essay ===
- First Prize: Eli Rueda Guieb III, "Symphony of Dry Winds in a Time without Rain"
- Second Prize: Jennifer Dela Rosa Balboa, "Violence, A Biography"
- Third Prize: Miguel Antonio N. Lizada, "The Bangkok Masseur"

=== One-Act Play ===
- First Prize: Layeta P. Bucoy, "The Adopted Healthy Baby"
- Second Prize: Jose Elvin Bueno, "Looking for Ulysses"
- Third Prize: Jonathan R. Guillermo, "The Hawk and the Viper"

=== Full-Length Play ===
- First Prize: No Winner
- Second Prize: Jose Maria Manalo, "Obando"
- Third Prize: Jorshinelle Taleon-Sonza, "Haiyan"

== Filipino Division ==
=== Nobela ===
- Grand Prize: Charmaine Mercader Lasar, Toto O.

=== Maikling Kwento ===
- First Prize: John Carlo I. Pacala, "Ang Reyna ng Espada at mga Pusa"
- Second Prize: Lilia Quindoza Santiago, "Mag-ambahan Tayo"
- Third prize: Andrian M. Legaspi, "Johnson at Putol"

=== Maikling Kwentong Pambata ===
- First Prize: Manuelita Contreras-Cabrera, "Sulat sa Birhen"
- Second Prize: Salvador T. Biglaen, "Ang Alamat ng Gulugod Baka"
- Third Prize: Corazon L. Santos, "Ang Hiling sa Punso"

=== Tula ===
- First Prize: Christa I. De La Cruz, "Mula sa Silong"
- Second Prize: Abner Dormiendo, "Sa Antipolo pa rin ang Antipolo"
- Third Prize: Christian Jil R. Benitez, "Sapagkat Umiibig: Mga Tula"

=== Tulang Pambata ===
- First Prize: Errol A. Merquita, "Ang Iisang Paa ng Tsinelas"
- Second Prize: John Romeo Leongson Venturero, "Si Iking Pasaway"
- Third Prize: No Winner

=== Sanaysay ===
- First Prize: Adelma L. Salvador, "Silat"
- Second Prize: Dionie Cabral Tañada, "Tawag ng Pangangailangan"
- Third Prize: Jayson Bernard B. Santos, "Ang Tiktik sa Kalye Moriones"

=== Dulang May Isang Yugto ===
- First Prize: Allan B. Lopez, "Sa Isang Hindi Natatanging Umaga, at Ang Mga Ulap ay Dahan-Dahang Pumaibabaw sa Nabubulok na Lungsod"
- Second Prize: Vladimeir B. Gonzales, "Mal"
- Third Prize: Marco Antonio R. Rodas, "Igba"

=== Dulang May Ganap na Haba ===
- First Prize: Kanakan Balintagos, "Mga Buhay na Apoy"
- Second Prize: Edgardo B. Maranan, "Diwata ng Bayan"
- Third Prize: George A. De Jesus III, "Maniacal"

=== Dulang Pampelikula ===
- First Prize: Eloisa Angeli Andrada Palileo, "Pink o Blue"
- Second Prize: Brylle B. Tabora, "Sekyu"
- Third Prize: Nita Eden So, "Alyas FPJ"

== Regional Division ==
=== Short Story [Cebuano] ===
- First Prize: Lamberto G. Ceballos, "Tuba"
- Second Prize: Manuel M. Avenido Jr., "Sa Lalaking Naligsan sa may Interseksyon"
- Third Prize: Januar E. Yap, "Liboa’g Usa Ka Hugon-Hugon Kabahin sa Tagulilong"

=== Short Story [Hiligaynon] ===
- First Prize: Jesus C. Insilada, "Amburukay"
- Second Prize: Ritchie D. Pagunsan, "Kalamay Nga Pula"
- Third Prize: Gil S. Montinola, "Ang Lapsag sa Taguangkan ni Belen"

=== Short Story [Iluko] ===
- First Prize: No Winner
- Second Prize: No Winner
- Third Prize: Rhea Rose Domasing Berroy, "Ti Naimas a Luto ni Inangko ken Dagiti Babbai iti Biwong"

== Kabataan Division ==
=== Kabataan Essay ===
- First Prize: Catherine Regina Hanopol Borlaza, "That Man, That Hero in Our Stories"
- Second Prize: Richard C. Cornelio, "A Loaded Gun in the House Next Door"
- Third Prize: Annicka B. Koteh, "Until Transcendence"

=== Kabataan Sanaysay ===
- First Prize: Karl Gabrielle B. De Los Santos, "Hindi Ko Alam"
- Second Prize: Lance Lauren L. Santiago, "Ang Nakakikiliting Kalabit ng Bukang-Liwayway"
- Third Prize: Jason Renz D. Barrios, "Kahimanawari: Mga Kwentong Aswang ni Lola Basyang"
