= 2016 Palanca Awards =

Philippine literary award

66th Palanca Awards
- Date: September 2, 2016
- Location: The Peninsula Manila, Makati, Philippines

The 66th Don Carlos Palanca Memorial Awards for Literature was held on September 2, 2016, at The Peninsula Manila in Makati to commemorate the memory of Don Carlos Palanca Sr. through an endeavor that would promote education and culture in the country. The awarding body received almost a thousand entries this year in 20 categories. Antonio “Tony” Mabesa was guest of honor and speaker at the awarding ceremony.

The 2016 winners are divided into four categories:

== English Division ==
=== Short Story ===
- First Prize: Richard C. Cornelio, "Zoetrope"
- Second Prize: Larissa Mae R. Suarez, "Sundays at the Cardozas'"
- Third Prize: Michelle Abigail Tiu Tan, "Things That Matter"

=== Short Story for Children ===
- First Prize: No Winner
- Second Prize: No Winner
- Third Prize: Joemar L. Furigay, "Saranggola"

=== Poetry ===
- First Prize: Ana Maria K. Lacuesta, "Hush Harbor"
- Second Prize: Merlinda Bobis, "Accidents of Composition"
- Third Prize: Angela Gabrielle Fabunan, "Homecoming Collection"

=== Poetry Written for Children ===
- First Prize: No Winner
- Second Prize: Jaime An Lim, "The Small Bright Things"
- Third Prize: Patricia Celina A. Ngo, "Miniature Masterpieces"

=== Essay ===
- First Prize: Joel Vega, "A View From Masada"
- Second Prize: Hammed Q. Bolotaolo, "Circle"
- Third Prize: Maria Roselle G. Umlas, "Lip Reading"

=== One-Act Play ===
- First Prize: Peter Solis Nery, "Tic-Tac-Toe"
- Second Prize: Robert Arlo DeGuzman, "1990"
- Third Prize: Patrick James Manongdo Valera, "Gawani’s First Dance"

=== Full-Length Play ===
- First Prize: Joachim Emilio B. Antonio, "The Floret Road"
- Second Prize: No Winner
- Third Prize: Michael Aaron C. Gomez, "Tirador ng Tinago"

== Filipino Division ==
=== Maikling Kwento ===
- First Prize: Orlando A. Oliveros, "Ang Daga"
- Second Prize: Emmanuel T. Barrameda, "Bangkera"
- Third Prize: Paolo Miguel G. Tiausas, "Cutter"

=== Maikling Kwentong Pambata ===
- First Prize: Annalyn Leyesa-Go, "Ang Nakabibilib na si Lola Ising"
- Second Prize: Manuelita Contreras-Cabrera, "May Pula"
- Third Prize: Eugene Y. Evasco, "Ambon ng Liwanag"

=== Sanaysay ===
- First Prize: Christopher S. Rosales, "Pugon na De-Gulong"
- Second Prize: Eugene Y. Evasco, "Mga Pagsasanay sa Paggalugad ng Siyudad"
- Third Prize: Segundo Matias Jr., "#PaperDolls"

=== Tula ===
- First Prize: Mark Anthony S. Angeles, "‘Di Lang Lalang"
- Second Prize: Louie Jon Agustin Sanchez, "Tempus Per Annum at Iba Pang Tula"
- Third prize: Allan John Andres, "#PagsisiyasatSaSugat"

=== Tulang Pambata ===
- First Prize: German Villanueva Gervacio, "Ang Totoo, Raya, Ang Buwan ay Itlog ng Butiki"
- Second Prize: John Patrick F. Solano, "Tiniklop-tiklop na Bugtong"
- Third Prize: Vijae Orquia Alquisola, "Awit ng Bakwit"

=== Dulang May Isang Yugto ===
- First Prize: Guelan Varela-Luarca, "Bait"
- Second Prize: Mark Adrian Crisostomo Ho, "Billboard"
- Third Prize: Ma. Cecilia C. De La Rosa, "Ang Mga Bisita ni Jean"

=== Dulang May Ganap na Haba ===
- First Prize: No Winner
- Second Prize: No Winner
- Third Prize: Lito Casaje, "Chiaroscuro"

=== Dulang Pampelikula ===
- First Prize: Jimmy F. Flores, "Kulay Lila ang Gabi na Binudburan pa ng mga Bituin"
- Second Prize: Eric Cabahug, "Deadma Walking"
- Third Prize: Ymmanwel Rico Provinio, "Alay ng Lupa sa Daing ng Dagat"

== Regional Division ==
=== Short Story [Cebuano] ===
- First Prize: CD Borden, "Tigpamaba sa Magay"
- Second Prize: Gumer M. Rafanan, "Lumba"
- Third Prize: Manuel M. Avenido Jr., "Estatwa"

=== Short Story [Hiligaynon] ===
- First Prize: Ritchie D. Pagunsan, "Ang Panaad"
- Second Prize: Early Sol A. Gadong, "Nagakaangay nga Panapton"
- Third Prize: Alain Russ G. Dimzon, "Bahal Nga Tuba"

=== Short Story [Iluko] ===
- First Prize: No Winner
- Second Prize: No Winner
- Third Prize: Roy V. Aragon, "Pamulinawen"

== Kabataan Division ==
=== Kabataan Essay ===
- First Prize: Jill Esther V. Parreño, "To Thine Own Self Be True"
- Second Prize: Dawn Gabriela Emmanuele G. Dela Rosa, "Then The Abstract Was Misunderstood"
- Third Prize: Alpheus Matthew D. Llantero, "iThink, Therefore iAm"

=== Kabataan Sanaysay ===
- First Prize: Mikaela Lu Apollo, "Hulagway sa Rabaw ng Tubig"
- Second Prize: Harvey D. Lor, "Minsan Nag-Selfie ang Isang Propagandista"
- Third Prize: Jason Renz D. Barrios, "Ang Pinakamagandang Pamato sa Larong Piko"
