= Hongkong and Shanghai Hotels =

Hotel group holding company

The Hongkong and Shanghai Hotels, Limited
- Native name: 香港上海大酒店有限公司
- Type: Public
- Traded as: SEHK: 45
- Industry: Hotels, Real estate, Tourism
- Incorporated: Hong Kong (HKCR No. 0000003)
- Founded: March 2, 1866; 160 years ago in British Hong Kong
- Founders: Douglas Lapraik, Charles Henri Maurice Bosman, Emanuel Raphael Belilios, Gustav von Overbeck
- Headquarters: Central, Hong Kong
- Area served: Asia, Europe, North America
- Key people: Michael Kadoorie (chairman); Benjamin Vuchot (CEO)
- Brands: The Peninsula Hotels
- Owner: Kadoorie family (majority ownership)
- Subsidiaries: The Peninsula Hotels
- Website: hshgroup.com

Hongkong and Shanghai Hotels, Limited (HSH)
- Chinese: 香港上海大酒店有限公司
Transcriptions
Standard Mandarin
- Hanyu Pinyin: Xiānggǎng Shànghǎi Dàjiǔdiàn Yǒuxiàngōngsī
Yue: Cantonese
- Jyutping: hoeng1 gong2 soeng6 hoi2 daai6 zau2 dim3 jau5 haan6 gung1 si1

The Hongkong and Shanghai Hotels, Limited (HSH) is a Hong Kong-based holding company of a hotel group. It is engaged in the ownership, development and management of The Peninsula Hotels; commercial and residential properties in Asia, the United States and Europe; and the provision of tourism and leisure, club management and other services. Michael Kadoorie owns 47% of the shares of HSH.

== History ==
The company was incorporated in 1866 as The Hongkong Hotel Company Limited, owner of the Hongkong Hotel (opened in 1868). The company was bought by the Kadoorie family in the 1890s, it merged with the Shanghai Hotel in 1922 and used the current name of Hongkong and Shanghai Hotels in the following year.

It was one of the first companies in Hong Kong to be listed on the Stock Exchange of Hong Kong. In 2007, the Hong Kong Heritage Project was set up to archive historical materials from HSH, CLP Holdings and the Kadoorie family. The publicly accessible archive provides audio, visual and documentary evidence of HSH's activities through the 19th and 20th centuries.

== Ownership ==
The major shareholders in HSH are part of the Kadoorie family. Members of this family have been chairmen since 1937, when Elly Kadoorie was first appointed to the post.

List of chairmen:

- Elly Kadoorie (1937–1942)
- Lawrence Kadoorie, Baron Kadoorie (1945–1950)
- Horace Kadoorie (1950–1985)
- Michael Kadoorie (1985–current)

== Hotels ==
=== Current ===
Asia

- The Peninsula Hong Kong - 1928
- The Peninsula Manila - 1976
- The Peninsula Beijing - 1989
- The Peninsula Bangkok - 1998
- The Peninsula Tokyo - 2007
- The Peninsula Shanghai - 2009

North America

- The Peninsula New York - 1988
- The Peninsula Beverly Hills - 1991
- The Peninsula Chicago - 2001

Europe

- The Peninsula Paris - 2014
- The Peninsula London - 2023
- The Peninsula Istanbul - 2023

=== Former ===
- Hongkong Hotel - Hong Kong
- The Palace Hotel - Shanghai
- Astor House Hotel - Shanghai

== Other properties ==
- Peak Tower, Hong Kong
- Peak Tram, Hong Kong
- The Repulse Bay, Hong Kong
- St. John's Building, Hong Kong
- Quail Lodge Golf Club, Carmel, California
