= Gaddi's =

Building in People's Republic of China

Coordinates: 22°17′43.05″N 114°10′17.51″E

- Interactive map of Gaddi's

Restaurant information
- Established: 1953; 73 years ago
- Owners: The Hongkong and Shanghai Hotels
- Head chef: Chef de Cuisine Anne-Sophie Nicolas
- Food type: French
- Rating: Michelin 1 star
- Location: The Peninsula Hong Kong, Salisbury Road, Tsim Sha Tsui, Kowloon, Hong Kong
- Website: https://www.peninsula.com/en/hong-kong/hotel-fine-dining/gaddis-french-restaurant

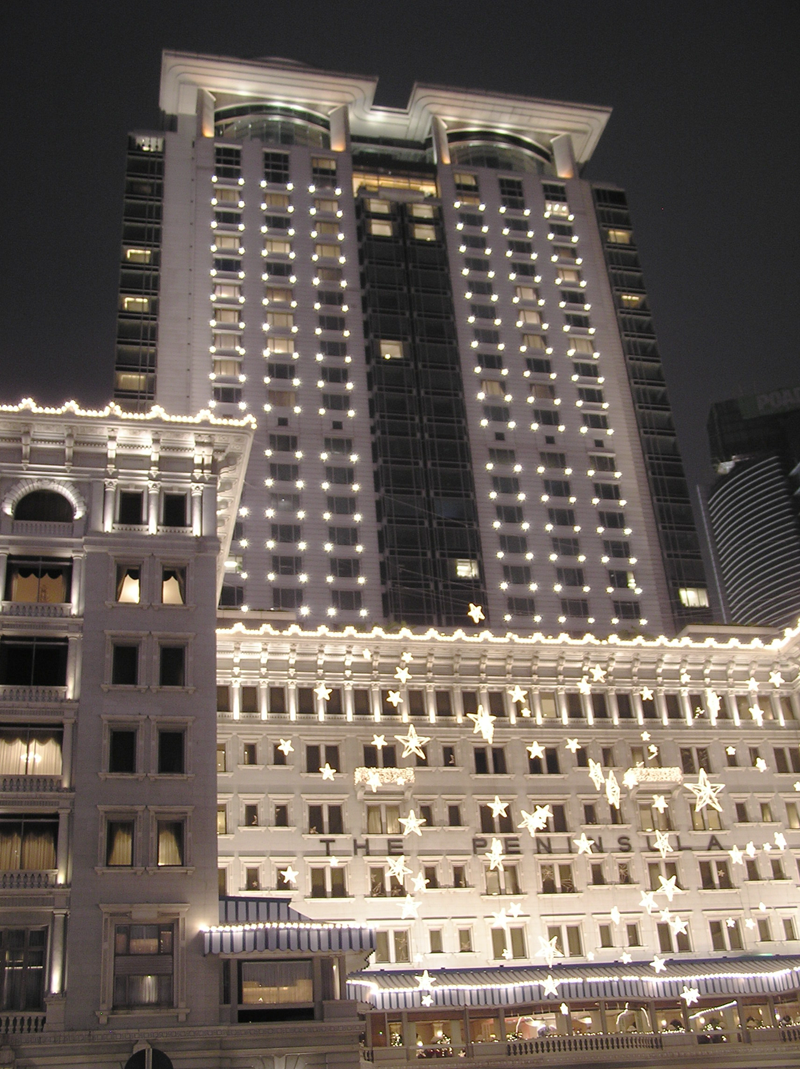
The Peninsula Hong Kong hotel, where Gaddi's is located

Gaddi's is a French haute cuisine restaurant situated in The Peninsula Hong Kong hotel. It was opened in 1953 and named after a former general manager of The Peninsula, Leo Gaddi.

Gaddi's opened in 1953 and moved from the hotel’s basement to its first-floor former ballroom in 1978. Anne-Sophie Nicolas became its first female chef de cuisine in 2024.

In November 2026, The Peninsula Hong Kong announced that Gaddi's would temporarily close on 31 December, as part of their renovation ahead of hotel's centenary in 2028.

== Decor ==
The decor is meant to evoke old Hong Kong and the hotel's original 1928 neoclassical architecture. It has a European dining room, with two six-foot crystal-and-silver chandeliers from Paris, Tai Ping carpets, and a Chinese coromandel screen dating from 1670.

It also created the first chef's table in Hong Kong where the Chef Table diners sit at a special table beside the Gaddi's kitchen viewing the dishes being prepared.

== Food ==
The food is classically French but with inventive European influences.Online Frommer's review

Chef Anne-Sophie combines classical French recipes with contemporary presentation and lighter preparations. She described drawing on historical French dishes while adapting their richness and presentation.

Ahead of the closure, there is a new 'Le Menu Heritage' which consolidates signature Gaddi's dishes over the years. Examples of these dishes include:

- Le Langoustine Bretonne with seaweed consommé and caviar
- Crayfish Quenelles with Nantua sauce and Alba white truffle
- Pigeon and Foie Gras Pithivier with Armagnac Salmis sauce and Perigord black turffle
- Grand Marnier Soufflé

The wine cellar is among the best and largest in Hong Kong, with a collection of rare vintages.

In a 2006 Independent feature on romantic dining, author Alexandra Antonioni wrote:

"They don't make restaurants like this any more and everyone should dine at Gaddi's at least once in their lifetime. Nothing can touch it for glamour and sheer indulgence."

== Recognitions ==
One Michelin star, <<Michelin Guide Hong Kong Macau>>, 2020 - 2026

Forbes Travel Guide Five-Star restaurant, 2018 - 2026

The Tatler Dining Award, 2024

One Diamond, Black Pearl Restaurant Guide, 2023

Pinor – China's Wine List of The Year Awards 2018

Wine Spectator 2020 – Best of Award of Excellence

Wine Luxe Magazine: Wine by The Glass Restaurant Awards Gold Medal 2020

Wine Luxe Magazine - Top 10 Wine Pairing Restaurant Awards 2020
