= The Peninsula Hong Kong =

Hotel in Tsim Sha Tsui, Hong Kong

- Chinese: 香港半島酒店

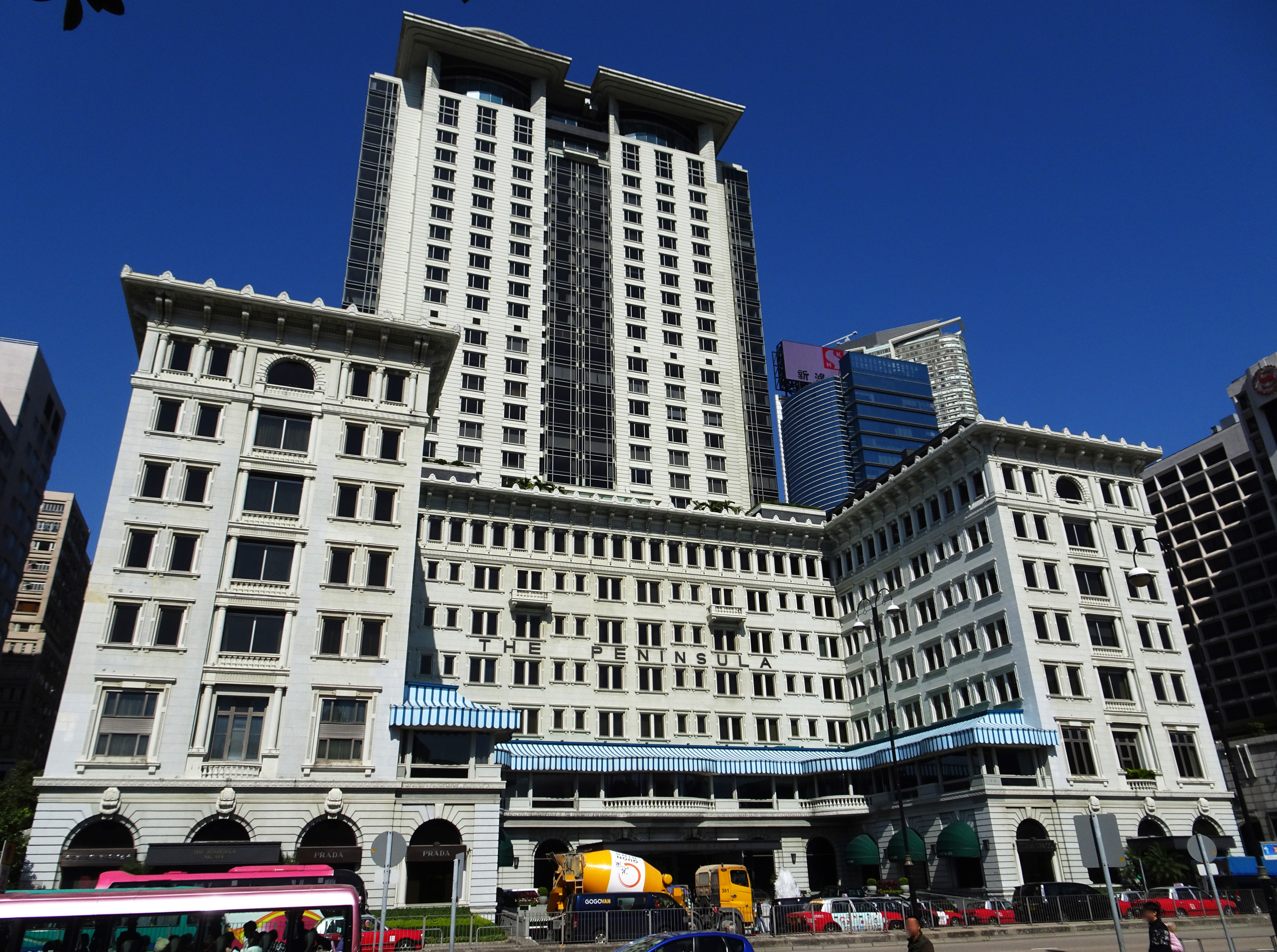
- The Peninsula and the Peninsula Office Tower in 2008

- Location within Hong Kong urban core
- Hotel chain: Hongkong and Shanghai Hotels

General information
- Location: Hong Kong, 22 Salisbury Road, Tsim Sha Tsui
- Coordinates: 22°17′43.05″N 114°10′17.51″E
- Opening: 11 December 1928; 97 years ago
- Renovated: 1994, 2012
- Renovation cost: HK$450 million
- Operator: The Peninsula Hotels Group

Other information
- Number of rooms: 300
- Number of restaurants: 8

Website
- Official website

The Peninsula Hong Kong
- Traditional Chinese: 香港半島酒店
Transcriptions
Yue: Cantonese
- Yale Romanization: Hēung góng bun dóu jáu dim
- Jyutping: Hoeng^{5} gong^{2} bun^{3} dou^{2} zau^{2} dim^{3}

The Peninsula Hong Kong is a colonial-style luxury hotel located in Tsim Sha Tsui, Kowloon, Hong Kong. It is the flagship property of The Peninsula Hotels group, part of the Hong Kong and Shanghai Hotels Group. The hotel opened in 1928 and was the first under The Peninsula brand. Expanded in 1994, the hotel combines colonial and modern elements, and is notable for its large fleet of Rolls-Royces painted a distinctive "Peninsula green".

== History ==
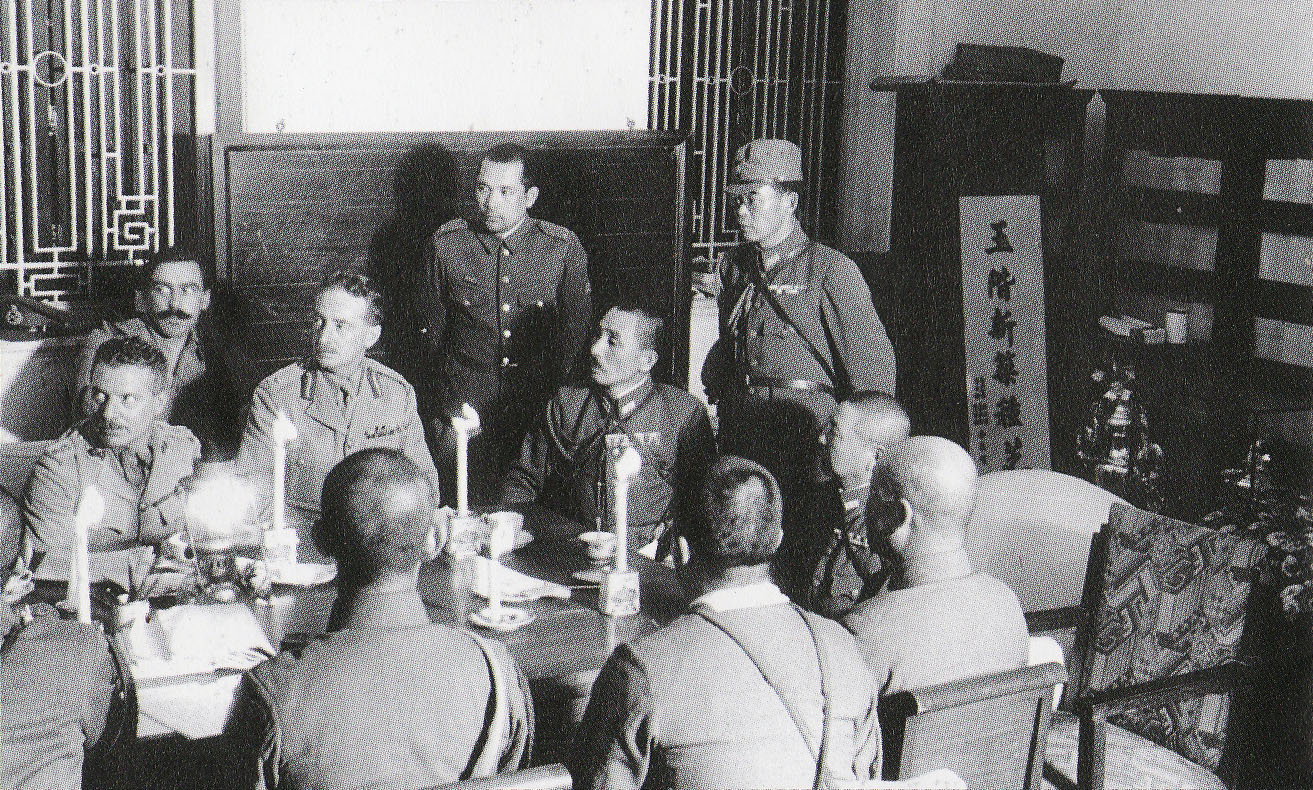
Major General Maltby discussing the arrangement of surrender with Japanese commanders at the Peninsula Hotel on 25 December 1941

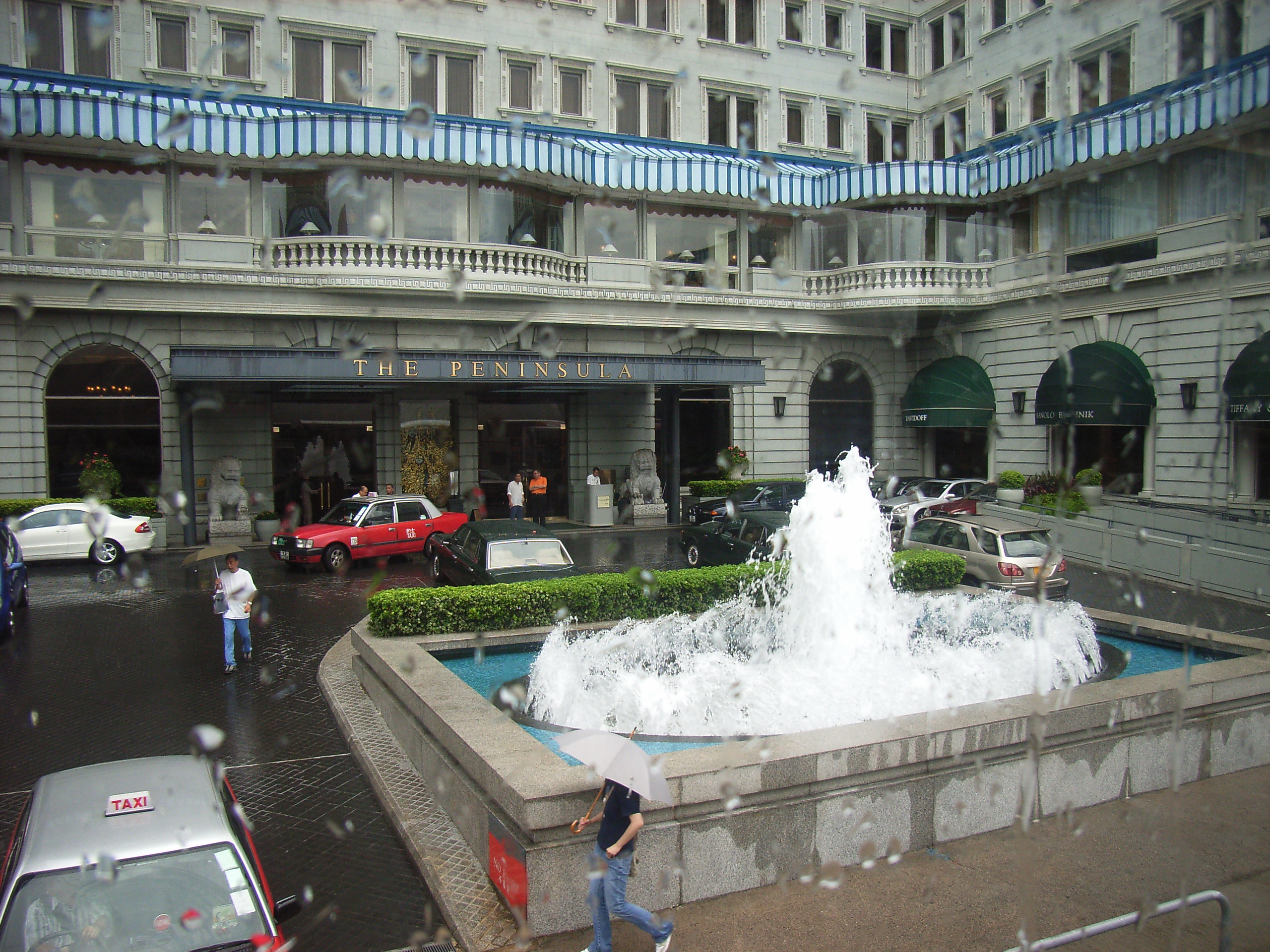
The main entrance

Founded by members of the Kadoorie family, The Peninsula was built with the idea that it would be "the finest hotel east of Suez". Originally planned for a 1924 opening, the hotel opened on 11 December 1928 and was the successor to Hongkong Hotel. The Peninsula was located in Tsim Sha Tsui, Kowloon, Hong Kong, at the junction of Nathan Road and Salisbury Road, directly opposite the quays where ocean liner passengers disembarked and near the terminus of the Kowloon-Canton railway.

Following the opening of the hotel, The Peninsula held Sunday concerts, nightly dinners on the terrace and twice-weekly dinners in the Rose Room. Dinner dances were held every night, with regular Afternoon Tea Dances. The Peninsula then became a popular meeting place for the community. It also became a place to spot celebrities. Charlie Chaplin and Paulette Goddard, stars of the 1930s film Modern Times, were among the hotel's guests.

On 25 December 1941, at the end of the Battle of Hong Kong, British colonial officials led by the Governor of Hong Kong, Sir Mark Aitchison Young, surrendered in person at the Japanese headquarters on the third floor of The Peninsula. The Governor was confined for two months in one of the hotel suites before being transferred to a prison in Shanghai. The hotel was then renamed "Tōa Hotel" (東亜ホテル, "East Asia Hotel"), and the rooms were reserved for Japanese officers and high-ranking dignitaries.

In his book God Is My Co-Pilot, Colonel Robert Lee Scott Jr., USAAF, commander of the 23rd Fighter Group, China Air Task Force, described in detail an aerial raid he led on the Japanese shipping anchored in Hong Kong harbour, conducted on 25 October 1942, and the lone attack he personally made in his Curtiss P-40K Warhawk (nicknamed Old Exterminator) upon the Peninsula Hotel:

"So, I looped above Victoria Harbour and drove for the Peninsula Hotel. My tracers ripped into the shining plate-glass of the penthouses on its top, and I saw the broken windows cascade like snow to the streets, many floors below. I laughed, for I knew that behind those windows were Japanese high officers, enjoying that modern hotel. When I got closer, I could see uniformed figures going down the fire escapes, and I shot at them...I turned for one more run on the packed fire escapes filled with Jap soldiers, but my next burst ended very suddenly. I was out of ammunition."

It was restored to its original name after Japan was defeated and the British regained control of the colony. The hotel today is part of the Hongkong and Shanghai Hotels group headed by Sir Michael Kadoorie and is the flagship property of The Peninsula Hotels group.

=== 1994 expansion ===
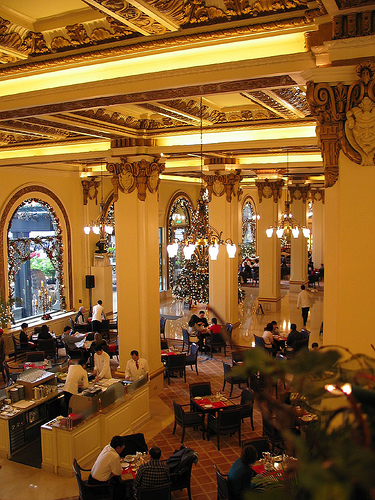
Lobby

In 1994, the hotel was expanded with a 30-storey tower in a similar architectural style to the existing building. The facade of the existing hotel building was preserved, including the forecourt, the lobby and the front facade. The hotel remained in operation while construction took place.

The new Peninsula Tower is topped with a helipad. It is used to transport VIP guests to the Hong Kong International Airport, a seven-minute flight away. World-record-holding Australian helicopter pilot Dick Smith, accompanied by Director-General Peter K. N. Lok of the Civil Aviation Department, piloted the inaugural certifying helicopter flight onto the helipad in 1994.

The redevelopment increased the total number of rooms to 300 with the addition of 132 rooms and suites. Other new features included 10 floors of office space, shops and hotel facilities.

=== 2012 refurbishment ===
To celebrate the hotel's 85th anniversary in April 2013, it launched a HK$450 million refurbishment programme. In September 2012, the first phase of the Peninsula Tower was completed. New features include digital enhancements ranging from touch-screen tablets and a DVD library of 3D movies to high-definition televisions. The decor of the rooms is in pared-down Oriental chic, with plain cream upholstery, vintage luggage-inspired drawer handles and Chinese ink painting-inspired ornaments. However, the renovation did not include the iconic lobby, restaurants and bars, which all remained unchanged.

== Architecture and facilities ==
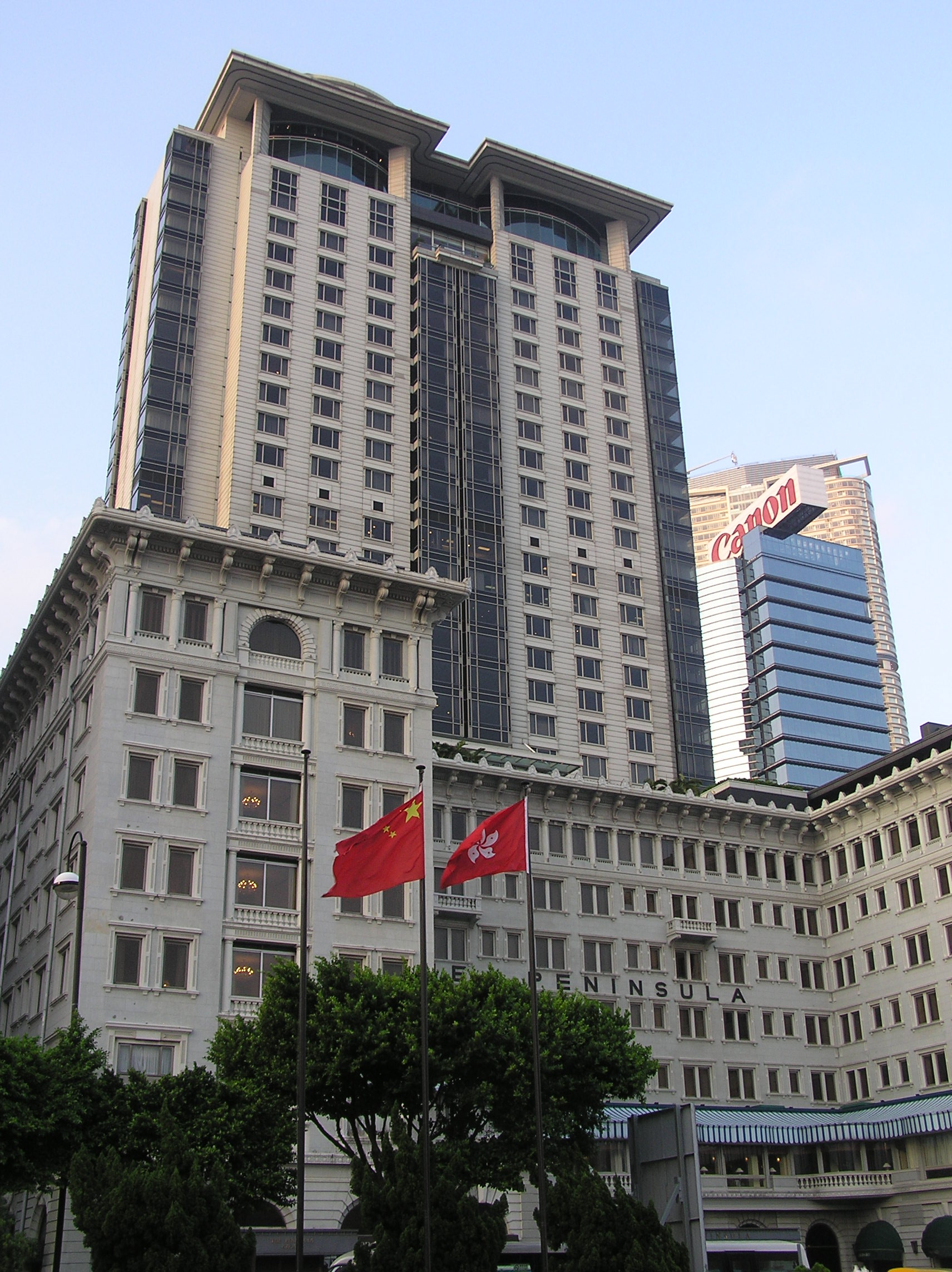
The exterior of the Peninsula hotel

The Peninsula is designed in the Italianate style. The lobby's design is a combination of Edwardian and Second Empire styles and includes ornamental stained glass, woodwork, and carpets and draperies dating from 1928.

=== Restaurants and bars ===
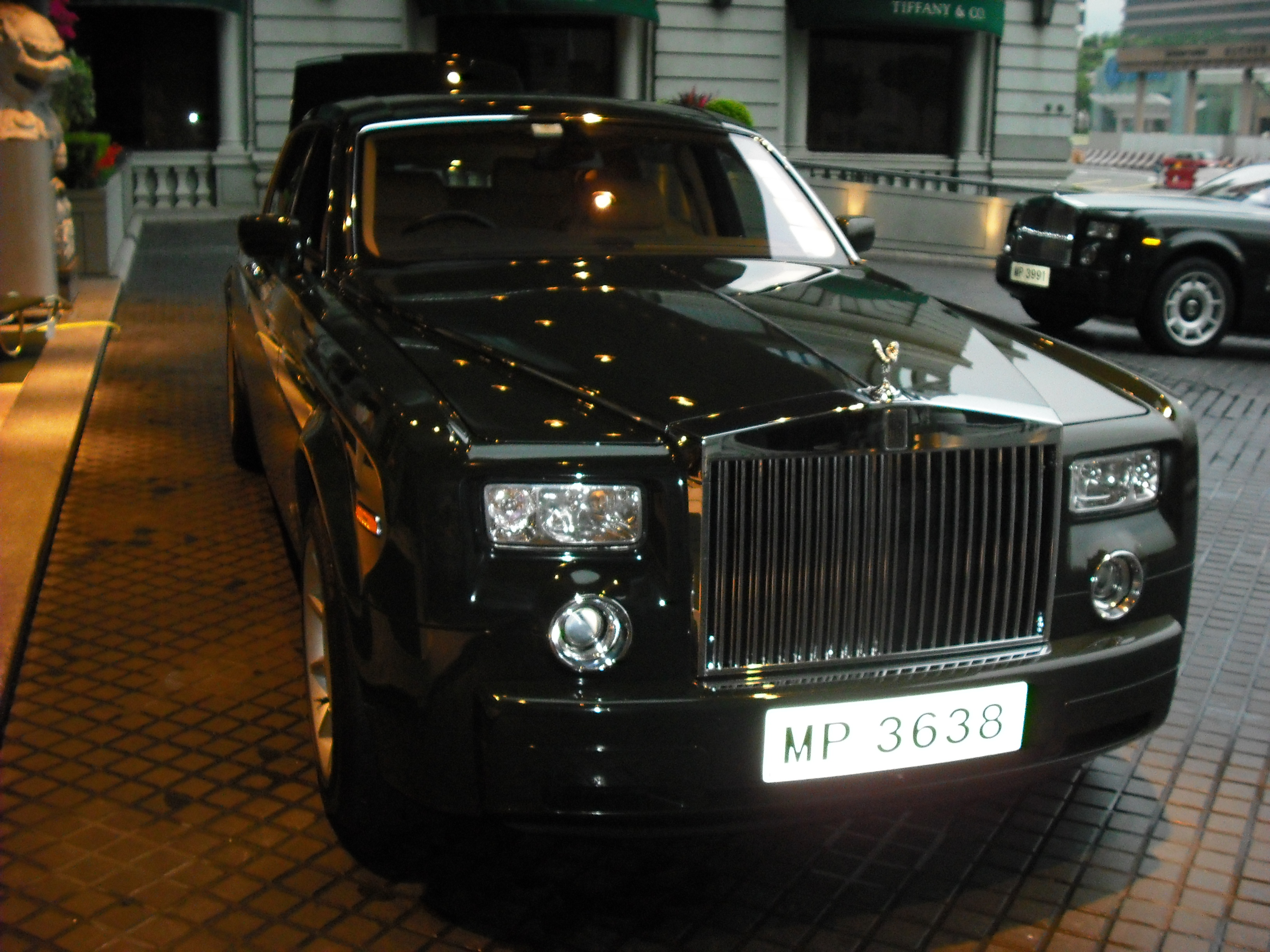
Rolls-Royce Phantom fleet

The hotel's food and beverage outlets include the gourmet French restaurant Gaddi's, which has one of the first chef's tables in Hong Kong, and the Philippe Starck-designed 'Felix'. Others are 'Spring Moon', 'Imasa', and 'Chesa', which specialise in Cantonese, Japanese, and Swiss cuisine respectively.

The Lobby serves traditional English-style Afternoon Tea, reminiscent of Hong Kong's colonial era.

=== Fashion arcade ===
The hotel has one of the oldest fashion arcades in Hong Kong. Throughout the years, it has housed international luxury brands such as Chanel, Dior, Hermès, Chrome Hearts, Gucci, Prada, Shiatzy Chen, Louis Vuitton, Cartier, Piaget, Roger Dubuis, Goyard, Franck Muller, Bvlgari, Tiffany & Co., Baccarat, ST Dupont, Harry Winston, Davidoff, Van Cleef & Arpels, Jacob & Co, and Ralph Lauren. Apart from international fashion houses, it was also home to Hong Kong brands, such as Betty Charnuis Clemos in the 60s, Dickson Poon in the 70s and Joyce Boutique in the 80s.

=== Fleet ===
Since December 2006, the hotel has had a fleet of 14 long wheelbase Rolls-Royce Phantoms painted in the hotel's signature green. It was the largest single order placed with Rolls-Royce in the history of the company. It replaced a fleet of Rolls-Royce Silver Spurs.

== In popular culture ==
In the 1974 James Bond film The Man with the Golden Gun starring Roger Moore, the hotel's fleet of Rolls-Royce Silver Shadows is mentioned.

The hotel was frequently featured in the TV series Dynasty and was the site of a number of negotiations over oil leases in the South China Sea. It was also prominently displayed in the 1988 NBC television miniseries Noble House. In the same year, Michael Palin visited the Hotel for the BBC's Michael Palin: Around the World in 80 Days.

In 2007, The Peninsula was used for a scene in the superhero film The Dark Knight, involving actors Morgan Freeman and Chin Han, who played Lucius Fox and Lau, respectively.

In 2015, The Peninsula was featured in the eleventh episode of the 27th season of The Amazing Race, serving as the location of the first route marker of the Hong Kong / Macau leg.

The hotel was also featured in an episode of Travel Man, guest starring Jon Hamm.

The Spring Moon Chinese restaurant of the hotel is sometimes credited with the invention of XO sauce.

== See also ==
- The Peninsula New York
- The Peninsula Beverly Hills
- The Peninsula Bangkok
- The Peninsula Manila
- The Peninsula Shanghai
- The Peninsula Beijing
- The Peninsula Tokyo
- The Peninsula Paris

== Literature ==
- William Warren, Jill Gocher (2007). Asia's legendary hotels: the romance of travel. Singapore: Periplus Editions. ISBN 978-0-7946-0174-4.
