= Betty Clemo =

莫蘭詩 (Mo Lan Shi) Betty Charnuis Clemo
- Born: Elizabeth Charnuis Borjigin; 1920; Beijing, China
- Died: 2005 (aged 84–85)
- Known for: Art director/Costume designer
- Awards: Asia Pacific Film Festival

Betty Clemo 莫蘭詩 (1920–2005) was a Hong Kong–based fashion and costume designer active in the 1950s until the end of the 1990s.

== Early life ==
Elizabeth 'Betty' Borjin Chernyshyova 'Charnuis' Clemo Yen was born in Beijing in 1920. Her father was Mongolian, belonging to the Mongolian Borjigit clan. Her mother, Yekaterina (Catherine) Chernyshyova was Russian, and apprenticed for Jeanne Lanvin in Paris. After her father's death, she moved to Shanghai, where her mother operated a couture house called Atelier Chernyshyova, later renamed Atelier Charnuis (Chinese: 夏如意). She employed primarily Russian refugees and catered to the high society of Shanghai, including the Soong sisters.

== Career ==
Clemo married English diplomat William Clemo in the 1930s and moved to London at the outbreak of World War II. William died during the war and Clemo eventually moved to Los Angeles under the advice of Elinor Glyn. With the help of Elsie de Wolfe, whose husband, Sir Charles Mendl, was a colleague of William Clemo, she was hired as a costume consultant for 20th Century Fox and worked extensively with Edith Head, Irene Sharaff, and Charles LeMaire. She later moved to New York and worked as the chief pattern maker for Valentina Schlee.

Clemo relocated to Hong Kong at the end of the 1950s to work as an art director and costume designer for Shaw's studio. Under the studio system, she worked at numerous projects and is best remembered for her collaboration with Lin Dai, where she designed most of her costumes on and off stage.

Generally regarded one of the first fashion designers in Hong Kong, she was the first to introduce Paris haute couture to Asia by importing licensed line-to-line adaptations of Paris haute couture fashions to Hong Kong. She created her eponymous boutique Betty Clemo's Couture in The Peninsula in 1962. Labels she carried throughout the years included Christian Dior, Nina Ricci, Maggy Rouff, Norman Hartnell, and Hanae Mori. Apart from local movie stars and socialites from Hong Kong, she also attracted a following of international celebrities such as Hollywood actresses Greta Garbo, Marlene Dietrich, Joan Crawford, Anna May Wong, Ava Gardner, Rita Hayworth, Merle Oberon, Jennifer Jones and Sophia Loren and royal figures such as the Duchess of Windsor and Princess Margaret.

She retired in the mid-1990s and moved to London with her grandchildren. She died in her sleep in 2005.

She is the grandmother of the New York fashion designer Chocheng.

== Awards ==
- 1961: Best Art Director at the Asia Pacific Film Festival for the movie Les Belles

== Filmography ==
=== Assistant costume designer ===
- Stage Fright (1946)
- Sudden Fear (1952)
- Affair in Trinidad (1952)
- Call Me Madam (1953)

=== Costume consultant ===
- Love is a Many Splendored Thing (1955)
- The King and I (1956)
- The World of Suzie Wong (1960)
- Flower Drum Song (1962)

=== Art director ===
- 千嬌百媚 (1961)
- 花團錦簇 (1962)
