= The Peninsula Chicago =

Luxury hotel in Chicago, Illinois

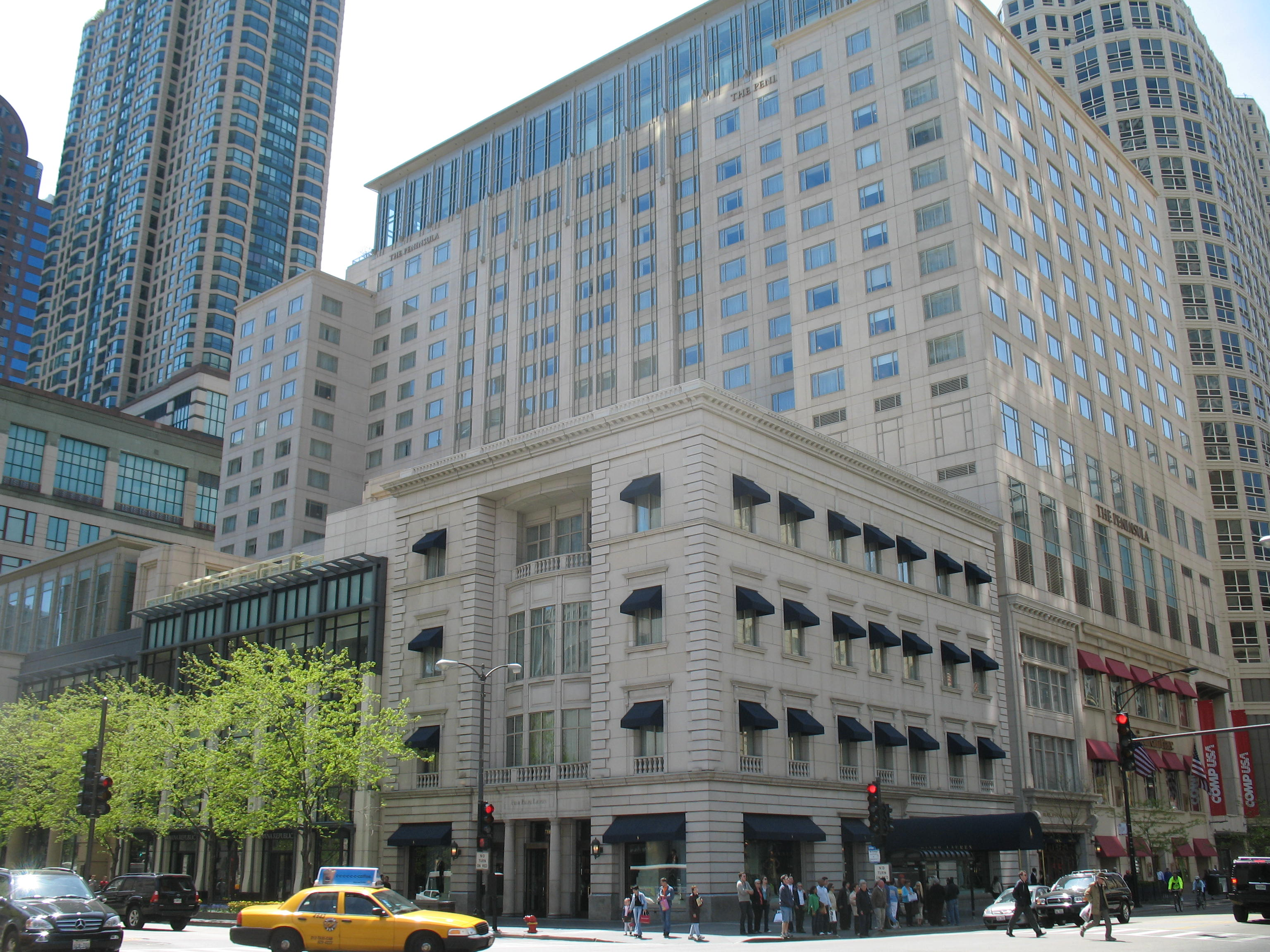
- The Peninsula Hotel viewed from North Michigan Avenue

- Location within Chicago

General information
- Location: 108 East Superior Street, Chicago, Illinois, U.S.
- Coordinates: 41°53′43.53″N 87°37′29.85″W
- Opening: January 2001
- Owner: Hongkong and Shanghai Hotels
- Operator: The Peninsula Hotels

Technical details
- Floor count: 20

Other information
- Number of rooms: 339
- Number of suites: 83
- Number of restaurants: 3 + 1 Bar

Website
- www.peninsula.com/en/chicago/5-star-luxury-hotel-downtown-chicago

The Peninsula Chicago is a hotel located at the intersection of East Superior Street and North Michigan Avenue in Chicago, Illinois. The hotel is part of The Peninsula Hotels group based in Hong Kong. The Peninsula Hotel group's parent Hongkong and Shanghai Hotels, who already owned 92.5% of the Chicago property's shares, purchased the remainder of the shares that it did not already own in late 2009, giving it full ownership of the hotel.

== Design ==
The Peninsula Chicago's architecture is inspired by the Peninsula group's flagship property in Hong Kong. Both hotels share the layout of arm-like wings projecting from the central section like a throne. The Chicago hotel's podium and high rise are derived from the flagship's original building and 30-story tower expansion, respectively. The Chicago hotel's Michigan Avenue side has a topside curtain wall and corduroy concrete patterns beneath the windows, similar to its Hong Kong forebear's historical facade. The Chicago hotel also has a two-story sky lobby, and the Superior Street entrance is flanked by Chinese marble lions, and most of its interior décor is similar to the Hong Kong hotel.

Designed by Elkus/Manfredi Architects of Boston and constructed by the Thomas J. Klutznick Co. of Chicago, the complex is a mixed-use project consisting of Phase 1, a 235,000-sf retail block that opened in 1997, and Phase 2, the 390,000-sf 339-room hotel that was completed in 2001. The high rise portion is set back from Michigan Avenue to reinforce the three-to four-story street-level scale, which allows the midday sun to filter into Water Tower Park.

== Location ==
Due to the hotel's proximity to Oak Street and the Magnificent Mile (Michigan Avenue), the building is within walking distance to Chanel, Armani, Gucci, and Louis Vuitton. As with most hotels in the area, the bottom floors are occupied by retailers, in this case Tiffany & Co., Ralph Lauren and Banana Republic.

== Features ==
The hotel offers limousine service to and from O'Hare International Airport and Chicago Midway International Airport. For business events and meetings the hotel has over 9,500 sq ft (880 m^{2}) available which includes boardrooms and a business center. For rooms, there are a total of 339 guestrooms and suites available. The hotel has multiple restaurants: Shanghai Terrace, Pierrot Gourmet, The Lobby and Z Bar serving Cantonese/Shanghainese, European, American cuisine small plates, and Global cuisine shared plates respectively. There are private dining rooms in Shanghai Terrace and Z Bar that are used for business meetings and special events.

The bar is named simply The Bar. The Fitness Centre takes up the top two floors. These floors are different from the rest of the hotel in that the pool room has floor-to-ceiling windows to optimize the view of Lake Michigan from the 25 m (82 ft) pool. The Fitness Centre also contains a spa which was awarded the Best Urban Spa Hotel by Spa Finder in 2007 and 2008. The city's only hotel ice skating rink (Sky Rink) is situated on the mezzanine.

== Awards ==
In 2018 the hotel was awarded the #2 best hotel in the U.S. by U.S. News & World Report and in 2017 the Travel + Leisure magazine's award for #1 Hotel in Chicago. The Peninsula is one of only four 5-star hotels in Chicago, the others being the Four Seasons Hotel Chicago, The Langham Chicago, and Trump Tower Chicago.

== See also ==
- The Peninsula New York
- The Peninsula Bangkok
- The Peninsula Manila
- The Peninsula Hong Kong
