= The Peninsula London =

London hotel

Coordinates: 51.5019°N 0.1519°W

Front of the hotel on Grosvenor Place

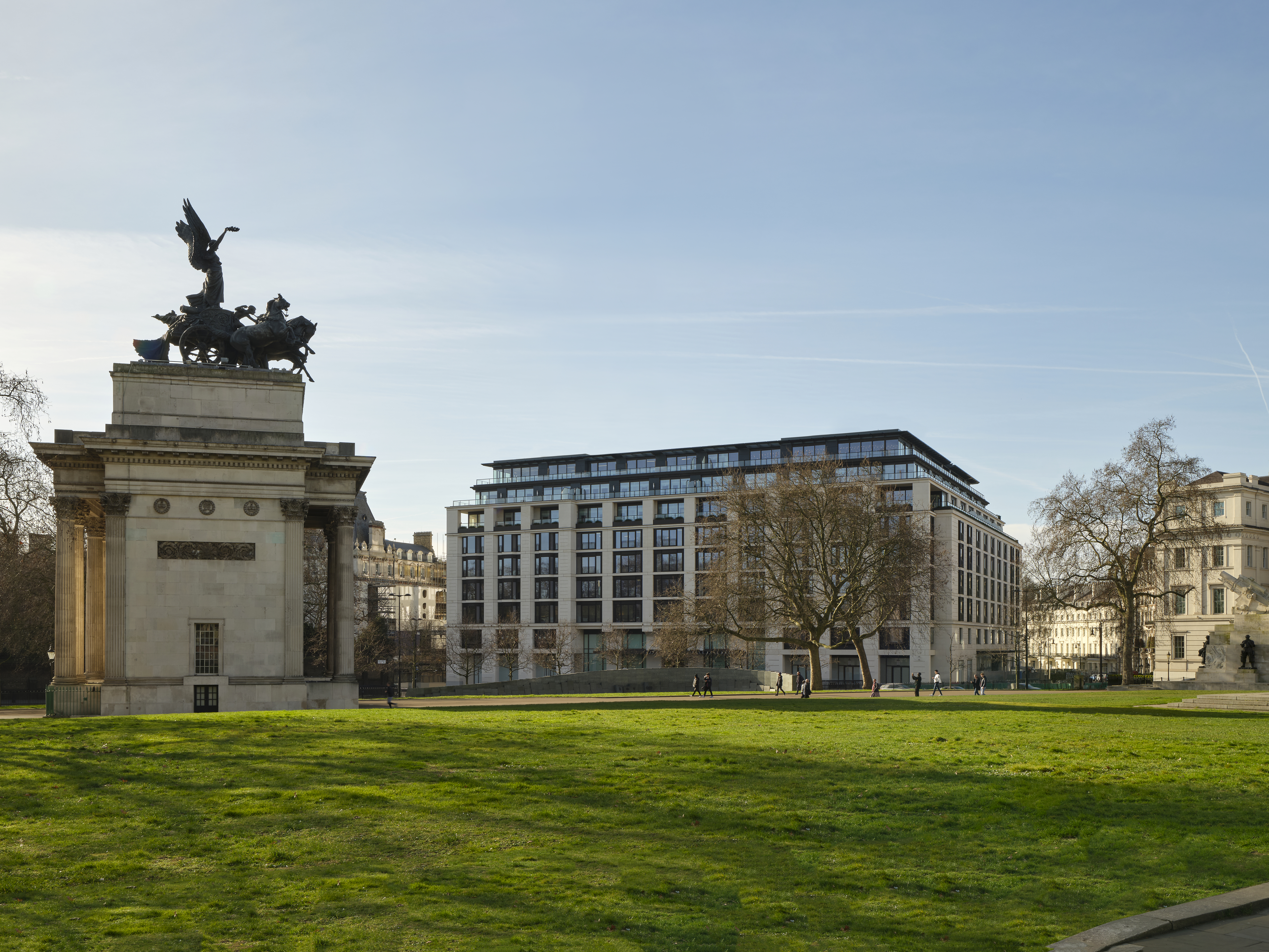
View of the hotel and Wellington Arch

The Peninsula London is a luxury hotel located at 1 Grosvenor Place in the Belgravia district of London, England. It is managed by The Peninsula Hotels group.

It was built specifically as a hotel, designed by architect Peter Marino. The reported cost of building the hotel was in excess of £1 billion.

The hotel had its first paying guests in September 2023. There are 190 guest rooms and suites, and another 24 longer stay apartments in The Peninsula Residences, attached to and served by the hotel.

== Brooklands bar ==
The hotel has a bar and restaurant named after the Brooklands racing circuit. It is decorated with a theme of historic motor racing and aviation related memorabillia.
