= The Peninsula Tokyo =

Luxury hotel in Tokyo, Japan

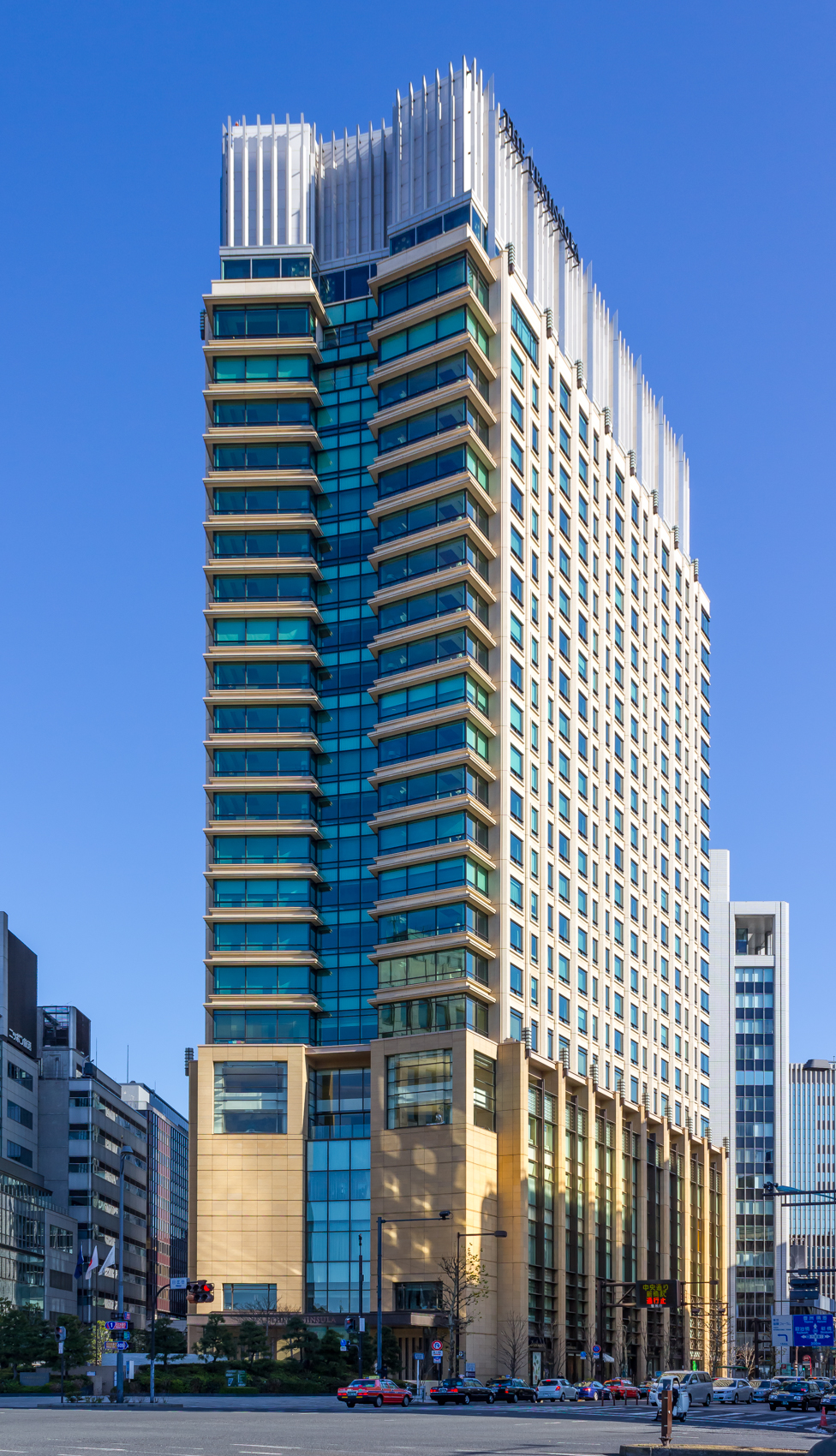

General information
- Location: Tokyo, Japan
- Opening: September 1, 2007
- Owner: Hongkong and Shanghai Hotels
- Operator: The Peninsula Hotel Group

Technical details
- Floor count: 24

Other information
- Number of rooms: 314
- Number of restaurants: 5

Website
- www.peninsula.com/en/tokyo/5-star-luxury-hotel-ginza

The Peninsula Tokyo is a 24-story luxury hotel located in Yurakucho, Chiyoda, Tokyo, Japan.

== Ownership ==
The hotel is operated by The Peninsula Hotel Group, and is the only Peninsula branded Hotel in Japan. It is owned by Hong Kong and Shanghai Hotels.

== Awards ==
In January 2012, the Peninsula Tokyo was awarded as the second best hotel in the world by American travel magazine Travel + Leisures annual '500 Best Hotels' List, only being beaten by the Mandarin Oriental, Tokyo, also in Japan. The Spa at the hotel was also awarded the 2011 Readers Choice award for favourite Spa in Japan by Spa Finder USA.

== Architecture ==
The hotel is also the first free-standing luxury hotel to be built in Tokyo in more than 10 years with direct street access, and it is described as 'international in design, but Japanese by inspiration.'

== Charity ==
The hotel is involved in Breast Cancer awareness and proudly supports the Japan Breast Cancer Screening Society.

== Restaurants and bars ==
- The Lobby
- Hei Fung Terrace
- Sushi Wakon
- Peter
- The Peninsula Boutique & Café

== See also ==
- The Peninsula Bangkok
- The Peninsula Hotels
- The Peninsula Hong Kong
- The Peninsula Manila
