= The Peninsula Beverly Hills =

Luxury hotel in Beverly Hills, California

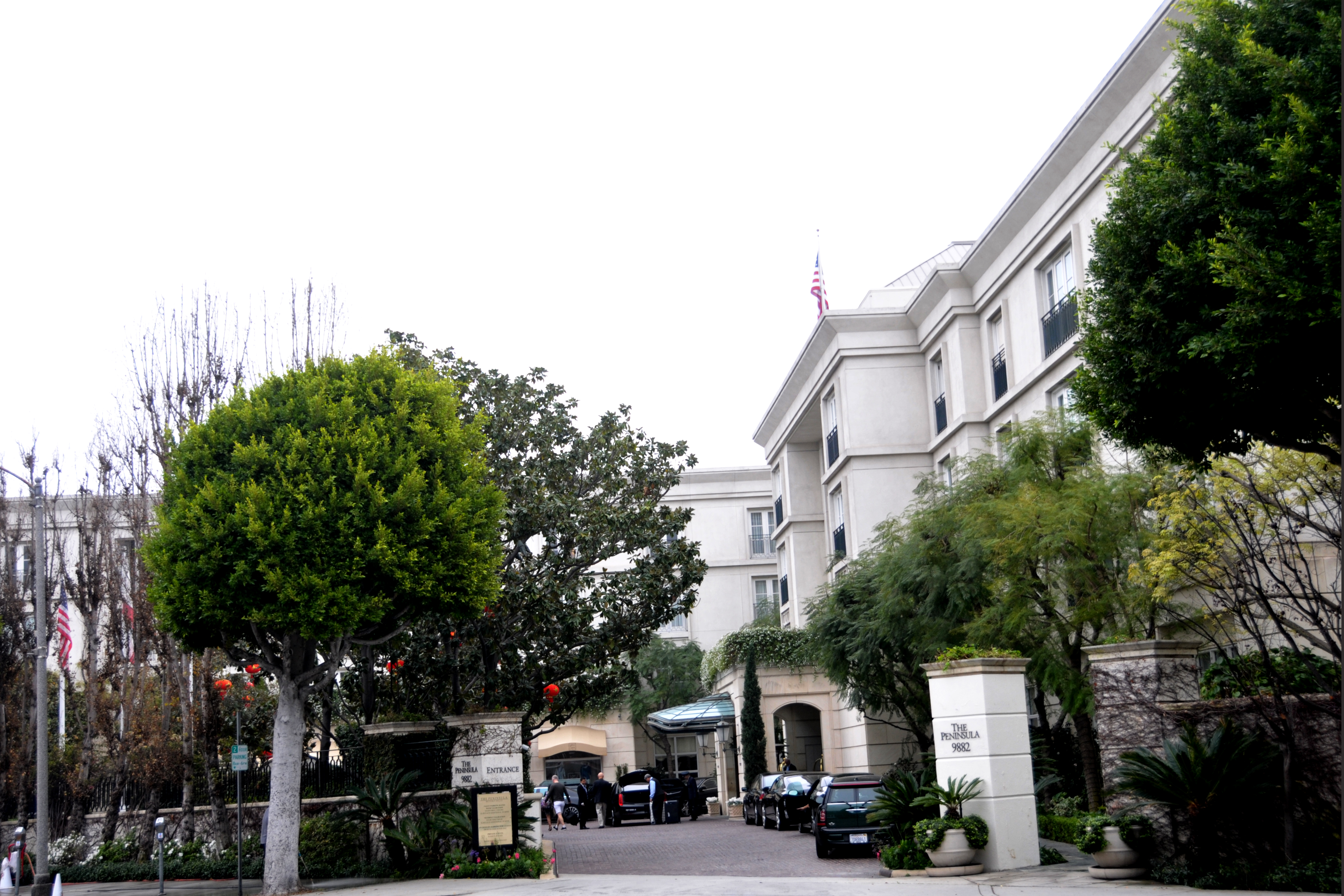
- The Peninsula Beverly Hills, 2015

- Location in the Western Los Angeles Area

General information
- Location: 9882 South Santa Monica Blvd., Beverly Hills, California, United States
- Coordinates: 34°3′57.22″N 118°24′40.08″W
- Opening: 8 August 1991
- Owner: Hongkong and Shanghai Hotels
- Management: The Peninsula Hotels

Technical details
- Floor count: 4

Design and construction
- Awards and prizes: Michelin key

Other information
- Number of rooms: 195
- Number of suites: 52
- Number of restaurants: 3 + 1 Bar

Website
- www.peninsula.com/en/beverly-hills/

The Peninsula Beverly Hills is a luxury hotel at the intersection of South Santa Monica Boulevard and Wilshire Boulevard. The hotel is part of The Peninsula Hotels, a chain owned by Hongkong and Shanghai Hotels. The Peninsula Beverly Hills was the second Peninsula branded hotel to open in the United States, with The Peninsula New York having opened three years earlier in 1988. When the hotel opened in 1991 it was the first new luxury hotel in Beverly Hills in 20 years.

== Location ==
The hotel is located in the centre of Beverly Hills, near public amenities such as Beverly Gardens Park, Westfield Century City and the Los Angeles Country Club. The nearby shopping street Rodeo Drive is located within a five-minute drive. The hotel is about a 35-minute drive from Los Angeles' main airport, LAX.

== Features ==
The hotel underwent a renovation in 2011 with all of the rooms being refurbished. There is also a 4,600 sq ft (430 m^{2}) spa at The Peninsula. Located next to the spa is a fitness center and a 60 feet (18 m) pool surrounded by 12 cabanas. The hotel has three restaurants: the Belvedere, the Living Room, and the Roof Garden. There is also a separate bar called The Club Bar.

== Notable events ==
- In February 1994, Anna Nicole Smith overdosed on prescription medication drugs here and was rushed to a hospital.
- In April 1994, Courtney Love was staying here when she was taken to hospital after an allergic reaction to prescription medication, and later arrested on suspicion of possession of a controlled substance and drug-related paraphernalia, but no charges were filed.
- In January 2002, American singer Carly Simon recorded her 25th album, Christmas Is Almost Here, in her room at the hotel.
- Author E. Lynn Harris died at the hotel in July 2009.
- The hotel has been featured in TV series including Bette and Family Law.

Film producer and convicted sex offender Harvey Weinstein committed many of his reported crimes in suites at the Peninsula Hotel.

== See also ==
- The Peninsula Chicago
- Chateau Marmont
- Beverly Wilshire Hotel
- Beverly Hills Hotel
- Hotel Bel-Air
