= The Peninsula Hotels =

Hong Kong–based hotel chain

- Company type: Subsidiary
- Industry: Hospitality
- Founded: 1928; 98 years ago
- Headquarters: Hong Kong
- Area served: Asia, Europe, United States
- Key people: Benjamin Vuchot (CEO)
- Services: Hotels
- Owner: Hongkong and Shanghai Hotels
- Parent: Hongkong and Shanghai Hotels
- Website: peninsula.com

The Peninsula Hotels is a chain of luxury hotels operated by Hongkong and Shanghai Hotels. Founded by the Kadoorie family, the first hotel opened in 1928 and now stands as the oldest in Hong Kong.

== History ==
The Hong Kong and Shanghai Hotels, Limited was incorporated in 1866. The company became engaged in real estate, acquiring land properties, and opened The Peninsula Hong Kong in Tsim Sha Tsui in 1928. The Peninsula Manila in Makati, Metro Manila, Philippines, opened in 1976. After a decade, the opening was followed by The Peninsula New York in 1988, as the company ventured into the US market. This was followed by a 1989 opening in Beijing and a 1991 opening in Beverly Hills.

In 2012, the company made headlines for issuing a ban on their menus to no longer serve shark fin soup, which is traditionally a popular delicacy in China. In 2015, The Peninsula Tokyo became EarthCheck certified. In 2017, The Peninsula Beijing became BREEAM accredited.

== Properties ==
As of 2024, Peninsula Hotels operates the following properties:

Property	No. of Rooms	Location	Country/Territory	Year opened	References
The Peninsula Hong Kong	300	Hong Kong	Hong Kong	1928	
The Peninsula Manila	351	Manila	Philippines	1976	
The Peninsula New York	235	New York City	United States	1988	
The Peninsula Beverly Hills	195	Los Angeles	United States	1991	
The Peninsula Beijing	230	Beijing	China	1996	
The Peninsula Bangkok	370	Bangkok	Thailand	1998	
The Peninsula Chicago	339	Chicago	United States	2001	
The Peninsula Tokyo	314	Tokyo	Japan	2007	
The Peninsula Shanghai	235	Shanghai	China	2009	
The Peninsula Paris	200	Paris	France	2014	
The Peninsula Istanbul	177	Istanbul	Turkey	2023	
The Peninsula London	190	London	United Kingdom	2023	

== Criticism ==
The Peninsula Hotels have been criticised by campaigners for the continued use of eggs from battery-caged hens across their hotel locations. A large number of the hotel group’s competitors including Mandarin Oriental, Hyatt and Intercontinental have made commitments to use only cage-free eggs by 2025. Hong Kong and Shanghai Hotels responded to the criticism by releasing a commitment to use only cage-free eggs by 2025.
