= The Peninsula Shanghai =

Luxury hotel in Shanghai, China

Coordinates: 31.2434°N 121.4847°E

- Traditional Chinese: 上海半島酒店
- Simplified Chinese: 上海半岛酒店
Transcriptions
Standard Mandarin
- Hanyu Pinyin: Shànghǎi Bàndǎo Jiǔdiàn

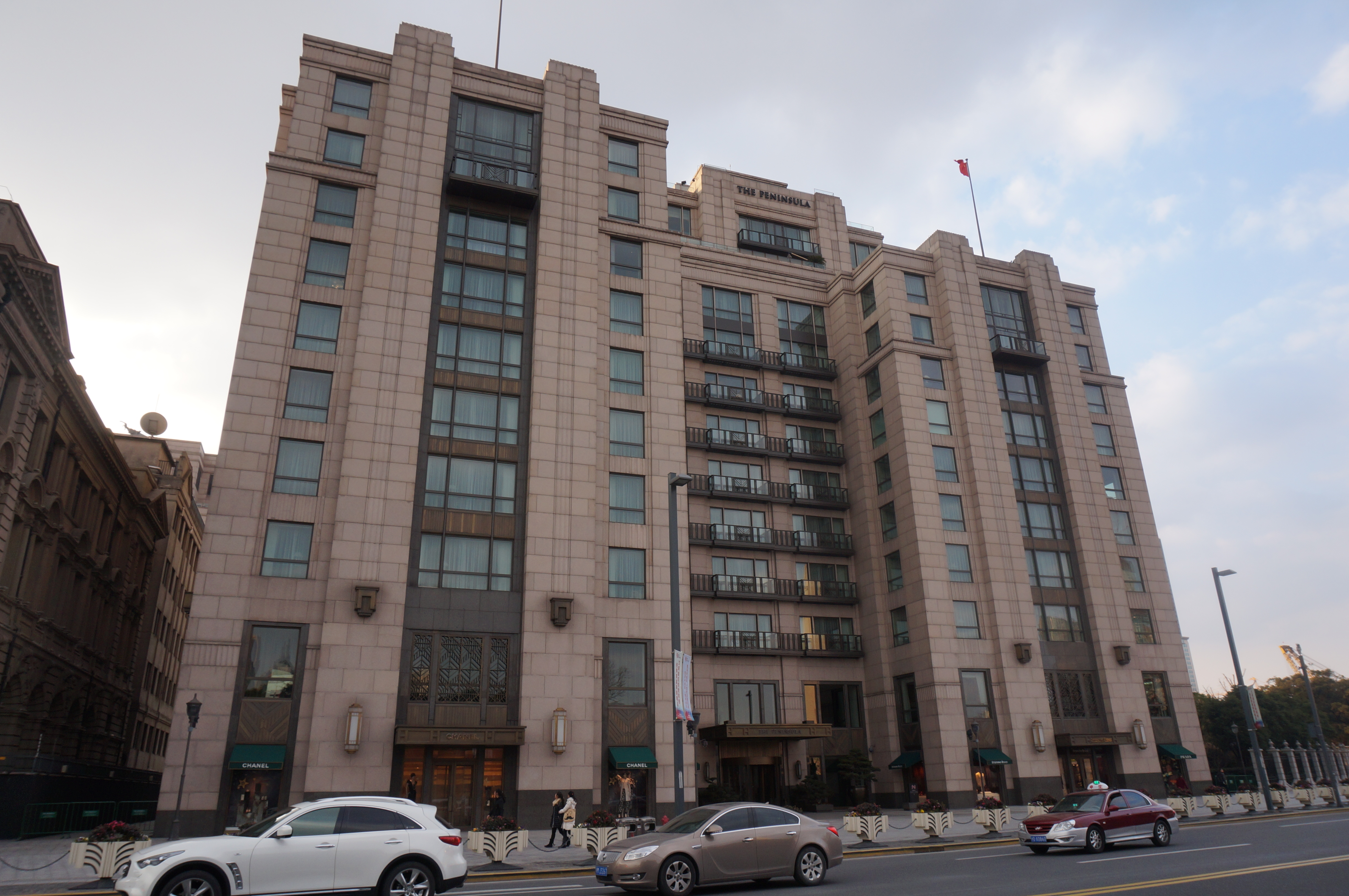
The Peninsula Shanghai

The Peninsula Shanghai is a luxury hotel among The Peninsula Hotel Group. It was ranked the No. 8 hotel in the world by Travel + Leisure in 2015. The Peninsula Shanghai opened in 2009 and is The Hong Kong and Shanghai Hotels second hotel in mainland China. Its address is No.32 Zhongshan East First Road, Shanghai 200002, China. It is right on the Bund.
