= The Peninsula Bangkok =

Luxury hotel in Bangkok, Thailand

- The Peninsula Hotel viewed from Chao Phraya River in 2022.

- Location within Bangkok

General information
- Location: Charoen Nakhon Road, Khlong San; Thailand
- Coordinates: 13°43′32″N 100°30′58.9″E
- Opening: November 1998
- Owner: Hongkong and Shanghai Hotels
- Operator: The Peninsula Hotels

Technical details
- Floor count: 37

Other information
- Number of rooms: 367
- Number of suites: 67
- Number of restaurants: 5

Website
- www.peninsula.com/en/bangkok/5-star-luxury-hotel-riverside

The Peninsula Bangkok is a 5-star hotel in Bangkok, Thailand. The hotel opened in 1998, counting 37 floors and 367 rooms. The hotel was 50% owned by the Hongkong and Shanghai Hotels (HSH) and 50% by the Phataraprasit family until 2020, when HSH purchased the Phataraprasit family's stake in the property.

== In popular culture ==
In the novel Snakehead by Anthony Horowitz, Alex Rider, the main character stays in this hotel while he is in Bangkok.

== See also ==
- List of tallest buildings in Thailand
- The Peninsula New York
- The Peninsula Hong Kong
- The Peninsula Manila
- The Peninsula Chicago
