= The Peninsula Paris =

Ultra luxury hotel in Paris

Coordinates: 48.8710°N 2.2933°E

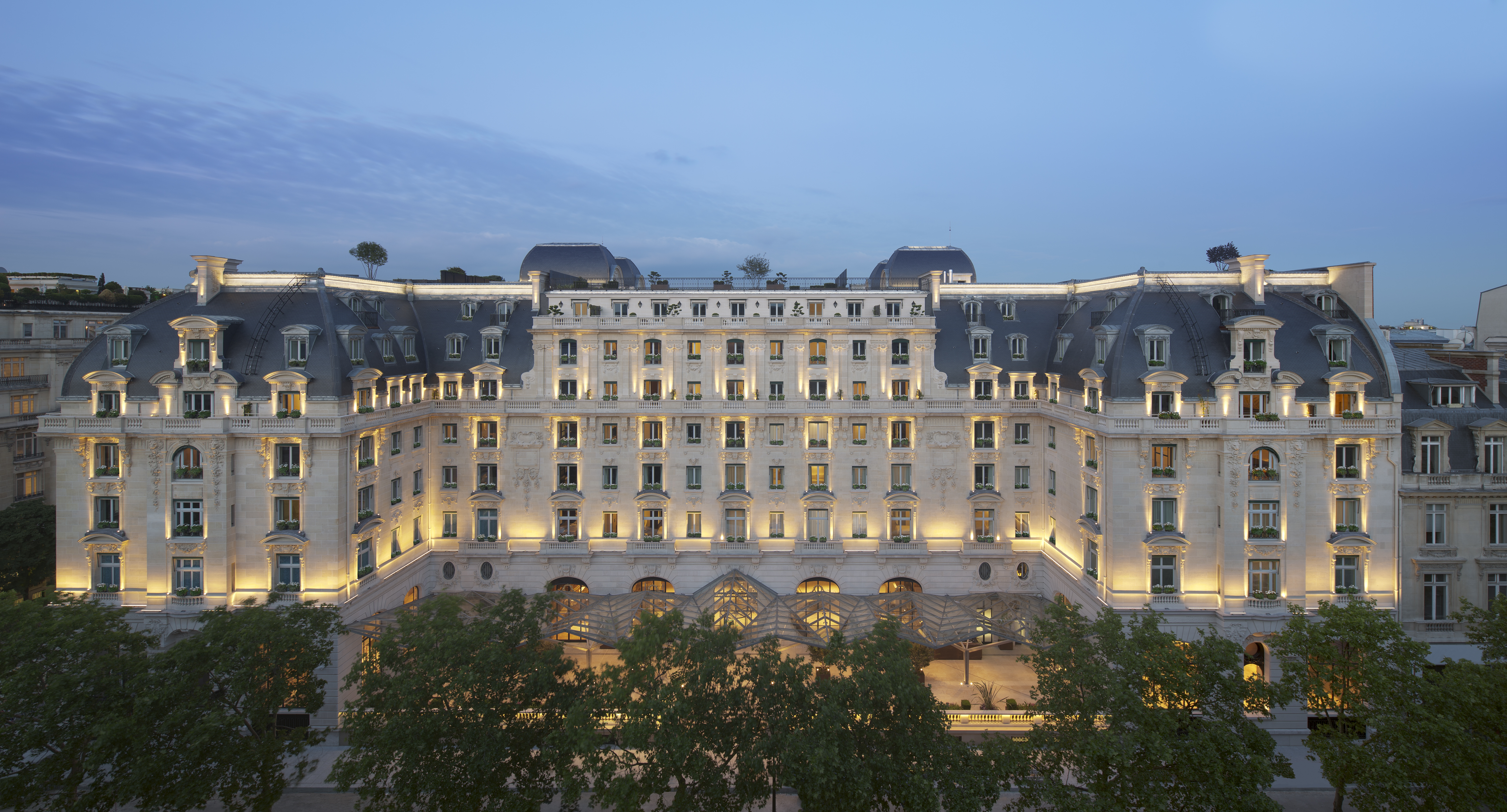
- The Peninsula Paris in 2014

General information
- Location: Paris, France, 19 Avenue Kléber
- Opened: 1908 (as Hotel Majestic); 2014 (as The Peninsula Paris)
- Owner: Katara Hospitality, Hongkong and Shanghai Hotels (20%)
- Operator: The Peninsula Hotels

Technical details
- Floor count: 6

Design and construction
- Architects: Armand Sibien (1908); Richard Martinet (2014)
- Developer: Leonard Tauber

Other information
- Number of rooms: 200
- Number of suites: 34
- Number of restaurants: 3
- Parking: 1

Website
- peninsula.com/paris

The Peninsula Paris is a historic luxury hotel and also part of the Palaces de France originally known as the Hotel Majestic, located on Avenue Kléber in the 16th arrondissement of Paris, France. It opened in 1908 as the Hotel Majestic and was converted to government offices in 1936. The hotel served as a field hospital for wounded officers during World War I, staffed largely by British aristocrats. During World War II, it served as the headquarters of the German military high command in France during the German occupation of Paris. The building played a pivotal role in the deportation of Parisian Jews and the 1944 assassination attempt on Hitler. The building reopened as The Peninsula Paris in August 2014, following a complicated and costly restoration.

== History ==
=== Early history of the site ===
Avenue Kléber, part of Baron Haussmann's rebuilding plan for Paris, was originally known as l'avenue du Roi de Rome in tribute to Napoleon I’s son, the Roi de Rome. In 1864, a rich Russian nobleman named Alexander Basilewski (de) constructed a palace at 19 avenue du Roi de Rome, designed by architect Clément Parent.

Basilewski sold the palace in 1868 to the Duke of Sesto, who renamed it the Palacio Castilla. It was bought on behalf of Queen Isabella II of Spain, who had just been exiled from Spain following the Glorious Revolution. The Duke of Sesto preceded the queen to France and arranged for her welcome by Emperor Napoleon III and Empress Eugénie. The Duke of Sesto and Eugénie had known one another since they were teenagers in Madrid.

The Palacio Castilla was used as the queen's home in exile, and it was where the Duke of Sesto and Queen Isabella plotted to have her son Prince Alfonso elevated to the Spanish throne. The duke talked Queen Isabella into abdicating on June 20, 1870, the ceremony taking place at Palacio Castilla in the presence of as many Spanish grandees as could be brought to Paris for the ceremony. The queen's abdication led toward France's declaration of war against Prussia less than a month later.

Queen Isabella continued to live in Paris, while the Duke of Sesto succeeded in arousing support in Spain for Prince Alfonso, who was welcomed into Madrid in 1875 as King Alfonso XII. However, he died at the age of 27 of tuberculosis, and he was succeeded by his son Alfonso XIII as an infant under the regency of his mother Queen Maria Cristina. Dowager queen Isabella continued to live in Paris until her death in 1904. The property was then acquired by hotel magnate Leonard Tauber after a bidding war that involved the United States government and the King of Belgium.

=== Hotel Majestic ===
==== World War I and the inter-war years ====
Tauber constructed the luxurious Hotel Majestic on the site, retaining Queen Isabella's bathroom accoutrements, including her marble bath, in the Presidential suite. Designed by Armand Sibien, construction began in 1906 and the hotel opened in December 1908. The hotel was purchased by Henry Devenish Harben for use as a military hospital at the outbreak of World War I in 1914, and served in this capacity for five months. It was damaged during its hospital service, and was not renovated and reopened until 1916. In 1919 the Hotel Majestic was the site for the Supreme Inter-Allied Council and Preliminary Peace Conference from February to June. In 1922 it was the site of a famous dinner hosted by Violet and Sydney Schiff and attended by Marcel Proust, Igor Stravinsky and Pablo Picasso. The "dinner party of the century" was immortalised in Richard Davenport-Hines's book, Proust at the Majestic: The Last Days of the Author Whose Book Changed Paris. The 1st unofficial Chess Olympiad was held at the hotel in 1924. George Gershwin wrote An American in Paris while staying at the hotel in 1928. British advertising tycoon David Ogilvy, having failed his exams in Oxford, worked in the hotel kitchens between 1931 and 1932.

==== World War II ====
The hotel was purchased by the French government in 1936 to serve as offices for the Ministry of Defence. It served as the headquarters of the German military high command in France (Militärbefehlshaber Frankreich) from October 1940 to July 1944 during the occupation of Paris in World War II. During the Nazi Occupation of Paris, staff army officials at The Majestic fought fierce battles with the Gestapo and the SS over policy, especially with regard to the deportation of Jews to concentration camps, reprisals against French partisans and protection of works of art in French museums. The Majestic became known as a centre of opposition to certain aspects of Adolf Hitler's policies, especially when Carl-Heinrich von Stülpnagel took charge of administering the Militärbefehlshaber Frankreich.

On May 22, 1942, following the Wannsee Conference, an exclusive presentation was made to the higher echelons of the German army at the Hotel Majestic by Reinhard Heydrich, one of the main architects of the Holocaust. He spoke of experiments for the killing of Jews using a specially prepared truck whose exhaust fumes would kill the deportees. In this context the word “gassing” was first used outside of Hitler's inner circle in relation to the extermination of the Jewish population of Paris. On this occasion, Heydrich introduced Carl Oberg, the new police and SS officer for Paris, who had been issued with the authority to order deportations of Jews without reference to the military commander of the French authorities. Militärbefehlshaber Frankreich staff at The Majestic were soon processing hundreds of deportation orders against the Jewish population of Paris. Joseph Goebbels established his Paris propaganda headquarters at the Majestic around the same time and the building's staff assumed control of the notorious Camp de Royallieu at Compiègne, known to the Germans as Frontstalag 122, which served as a feeder station for the extermination camps at Auschwitz, Ravensbrück, Buchenwald and Dachau.

Stülpnagel opposed the policy and decided to act against Hitler. With other members of the officer class working out of The Majestic and billeted in The Raphael next door, Stülpnagel began to plan Hitler's assassination from his office on The Majestic's second floor. On 20 July 1944, Stülpnagel's co-conspirator Claus von Stauffenberg made his assassination attempt on Hitler at the Wolfsschanze in East Prussia. For his part, Stülpnagel put his part of the plot into operation from The Majestic, ordering Hans Otfried von Linstow to round up all SS and Gestapo officers in Paris and imprison them. These events were witnessed by Walter Bargatzky, a high ranking German officer who wrote Hotel Majestic: Ein Deutscher im besetzten Frankreich and was a supporter of the plot to kill Hitler. After the plot failed, Bargatzky left his office at The Majestic and returned to room 409 in The Raphael to await his arrest. It never came and like other fringe members of the plot, Bargatzky was allowed to serve out the war at The Majestic.

The final battle for The Majestic took place on 25 August in the afternoon as Jaques Massu and Colonel Paul de Langlade of the French 2nd Armored Division moved their troops from the Champs-Élysées to the heavily fortified and barricaded Avenue Kléber. One of Massu's officers worked his way around the rear of The Majestic on Rue la Pérouse, which was protected by a blockhouse that could only be subdued by a bazooka, but the Germans inside the hotel said they would be willing to surrender to regular soldiers, rather than men of the Resistance. A German spokesman was brought to Massu under a white flag and with Langlade's approval, Massu went to The Majestic accompanied by Senior Sergeant Dannic. As they approached Dannic was shot dead by a sniper firing from the hotel's rooftop. Despite this, Massu continued up the hotel's steps and entered The Majestic's lobby to find fifty German officers and 300 other ranks. The Germans surrendered to Massu without further resistance, using a bilingual bell-boy from the hotel as their interpreter.

==== Post-war government offices ====
In the post war-era The Majestic served as the first headquarters of UNESCO, from September 16, 1946 until 1958, when it was converted into a conference center for the French Ministry of Foreign Affairs, known as the International Conference Center. The Organisation for Economic Co-operation and Development was founded at the hotel in 1960 and it was the location for the signing of the Paris Peace Accords on January 27, 1973 that ended American involvement in the Vietnam War. Later, on October 23, 1991, the 1991 Paris Peace Agreements, which ended the Cambodian-Vietnamese War and Khmer Rouge civil war, were also signed there.

=== The Peninsula Paris ===
The French government sold the building in 2008 as part of a cost-cutting measure to the Qatari Diar firm for $460 million. It reopened on August 1, 2014, following extensive rebuilding by Vinci Construction costing €338 million, as The Peninsula Paris, the famous hotel chain's first property in Europe, in a joint venture with Katara Hospitality. The Hongkong and Shanghai Hotels, Limited, parent company of Peninsula Hotels, owns a 20% interest in the property. The architectural designs were by Richard Martinet of Affine architecture & interior design, while the interiors were by Henry Leung of Hong Kong-based CAP Atelier Ltd. The hotel offers 200 luxury rooms, including 34 suites.

== 21 avenue Kléber ==
The Second Empire building was acquired in 2013 by The Peninsula Hotels and located next to Peninsula Paris. Built in 1900, the building is a commercial building along the historic Avenue Kléber.

== Gallery ==
The Peninsula Paris

German officers captured by Free French troops are lodged in the Hotel Majestic

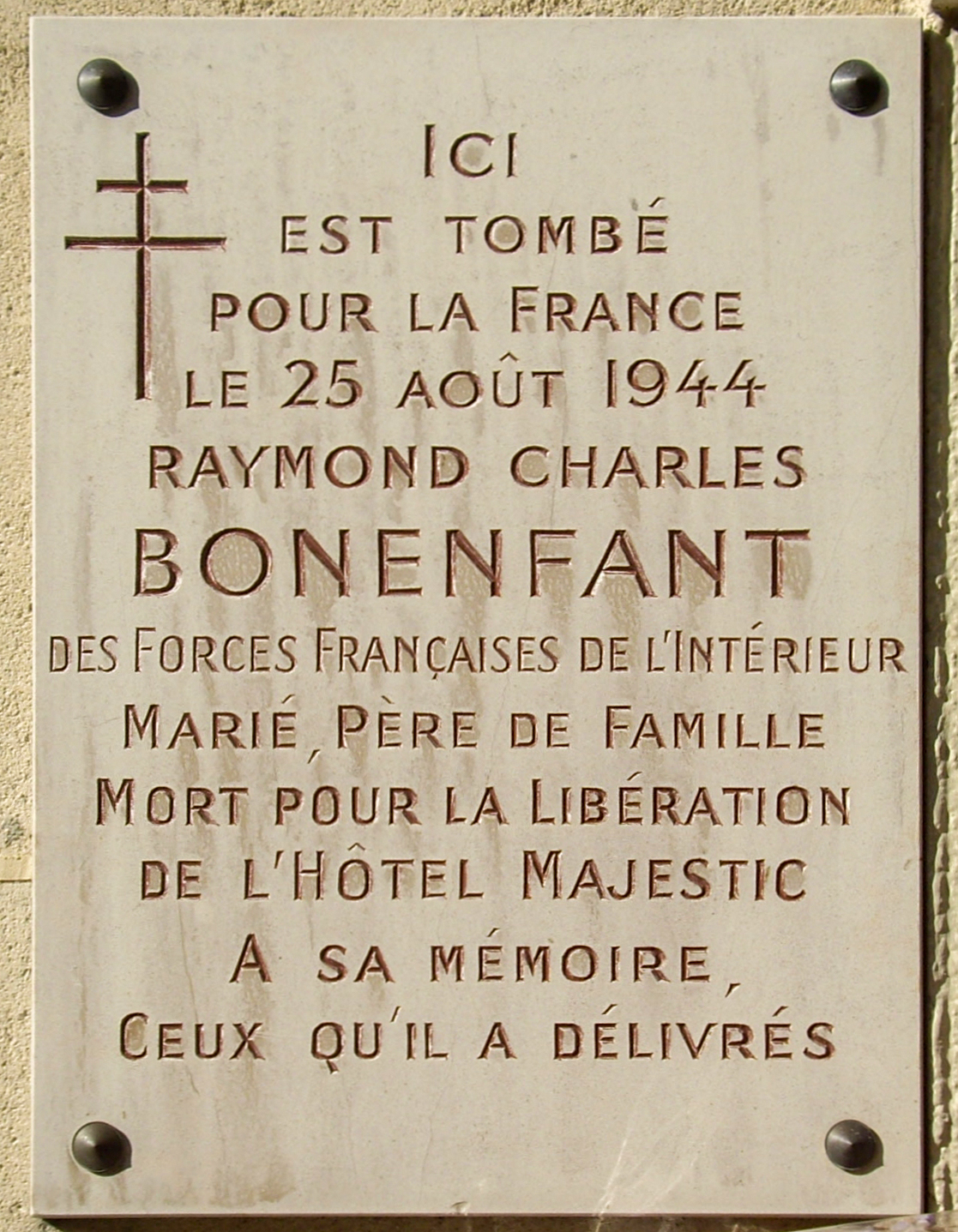
Plaque commemorating Raymond Bonenfant, who was killed at 17 rue Galilée in the battle for the nearby Hotel Majestic

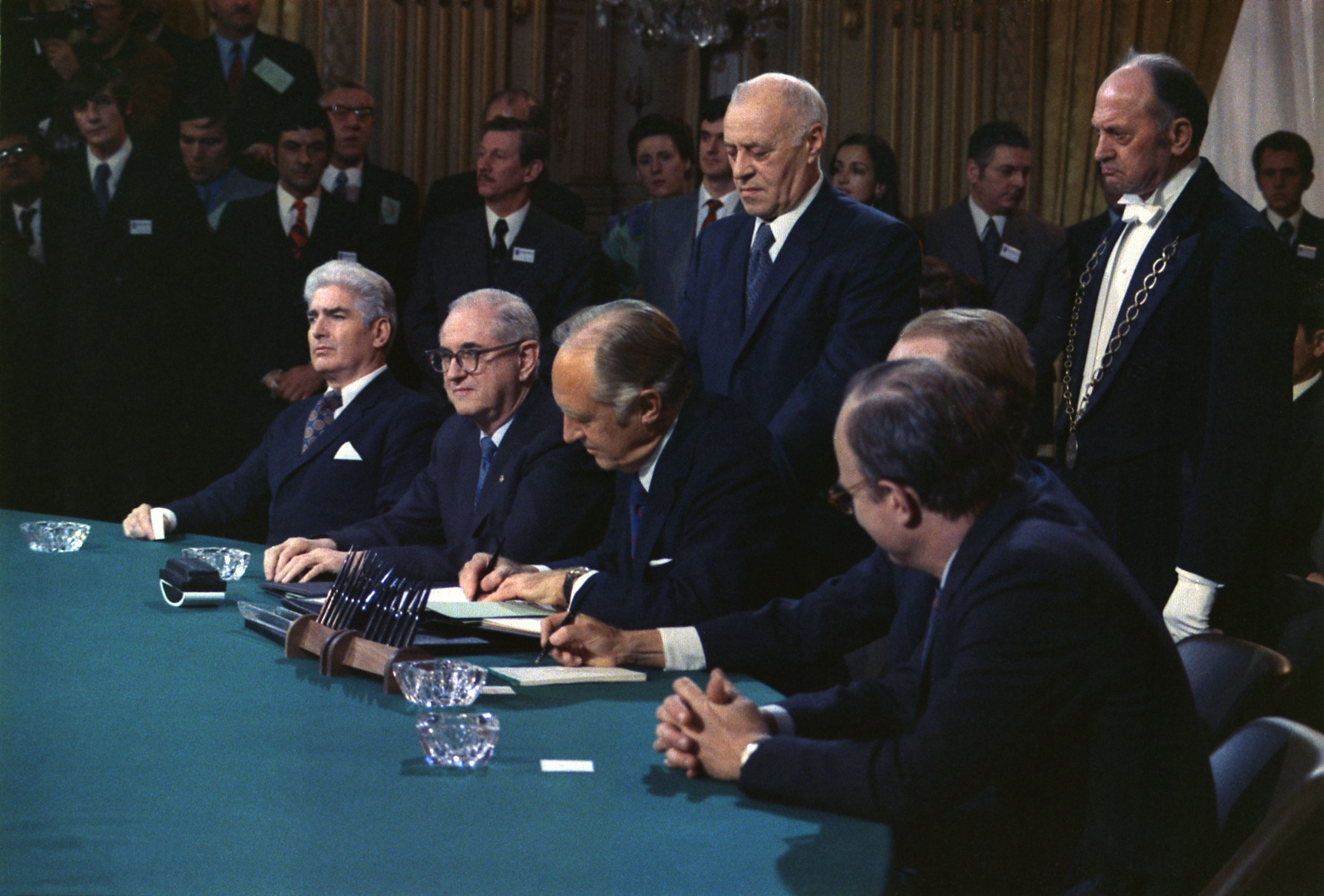
Signing the Paris Peace Accords, 1973

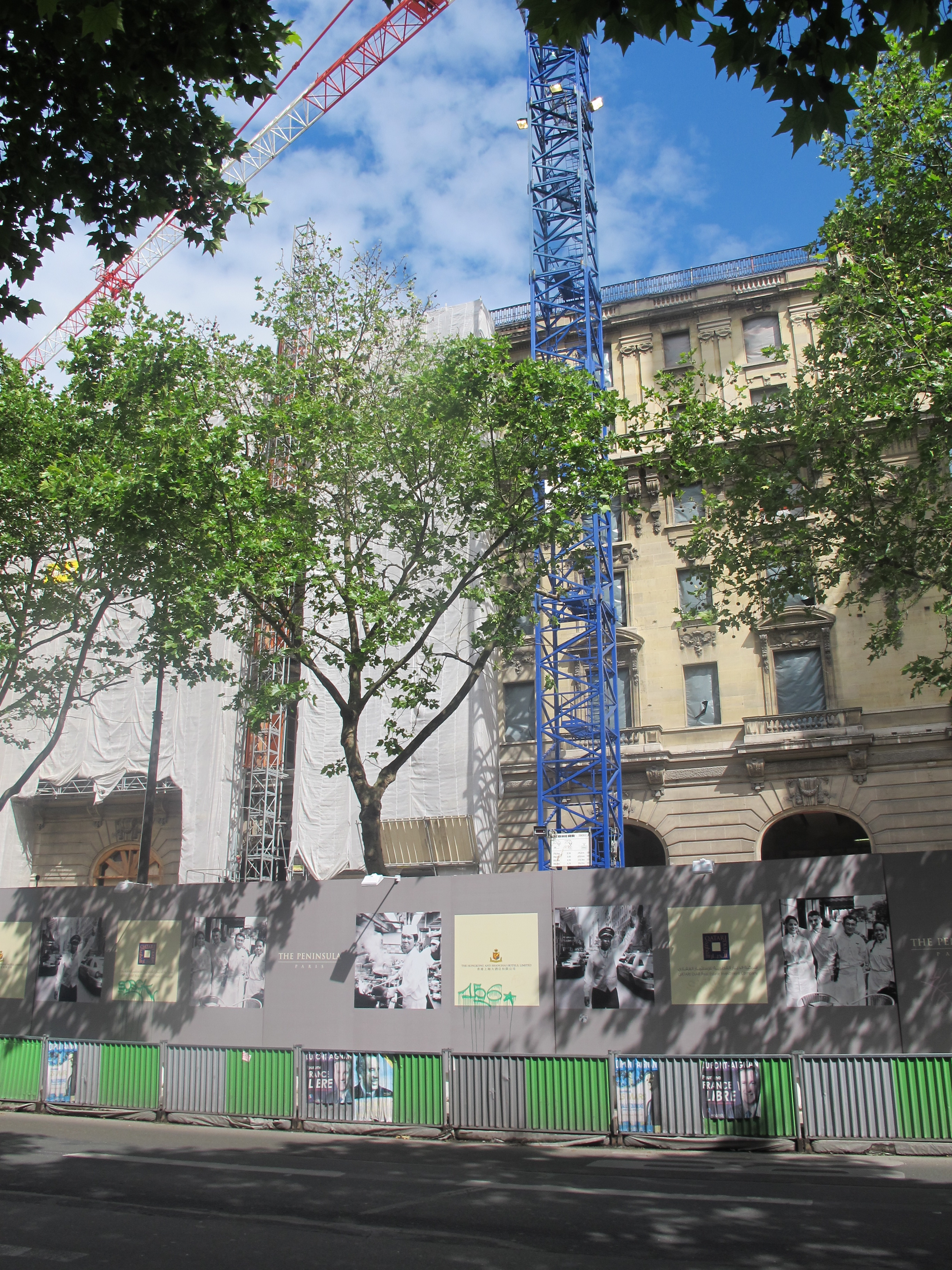
Construction at The Peninsula Paris, June 2012
