= The Peninsula Manila =

Luxury hotel in Makati, the Philippines

- The Peninsula Manila in 2015

General information
- Location: Corners of Ayala and Makati Avenues, Makati, Philippines
- Coordinates: 14°33′18″N 121°01′30″E
- Opening: September 14, 1976; 50 years ago
- Owner: Hongkong and Shanghai Hotels Ltd.
- Operator: Manila Peninsula Hotel, Inc.

Technical details
- Floor count: 11

Design and construction
- Architect: Gabriel Formoso

Other information
- Number of rooms: 469
- Number of suites: 46
- Number of restaurants: 7 (including 2 bars)

Website
- peninsula.com/manila

The Peninsula Manila (colloquially known as the Manila Peninsula or simply Manila Pen) is a 5-star luxury hotel in the Philippines. It is located on the corner of Ayala Avenue and Makati Avenue in the Makati Central Business District, falling under the jurisdiction of Barangay Urdaneta. The hotel is part of The Peninsula Hotels chain based in Hong Kong and is the first hotel of that chain outside the Chinese territory.

The land is owned by Ayala Hotels, Inc. (a subsidiary of Ayala Corporation) and is leased to Manila Peninsula Hotel, Inc., the hotel's operator.

== History ==
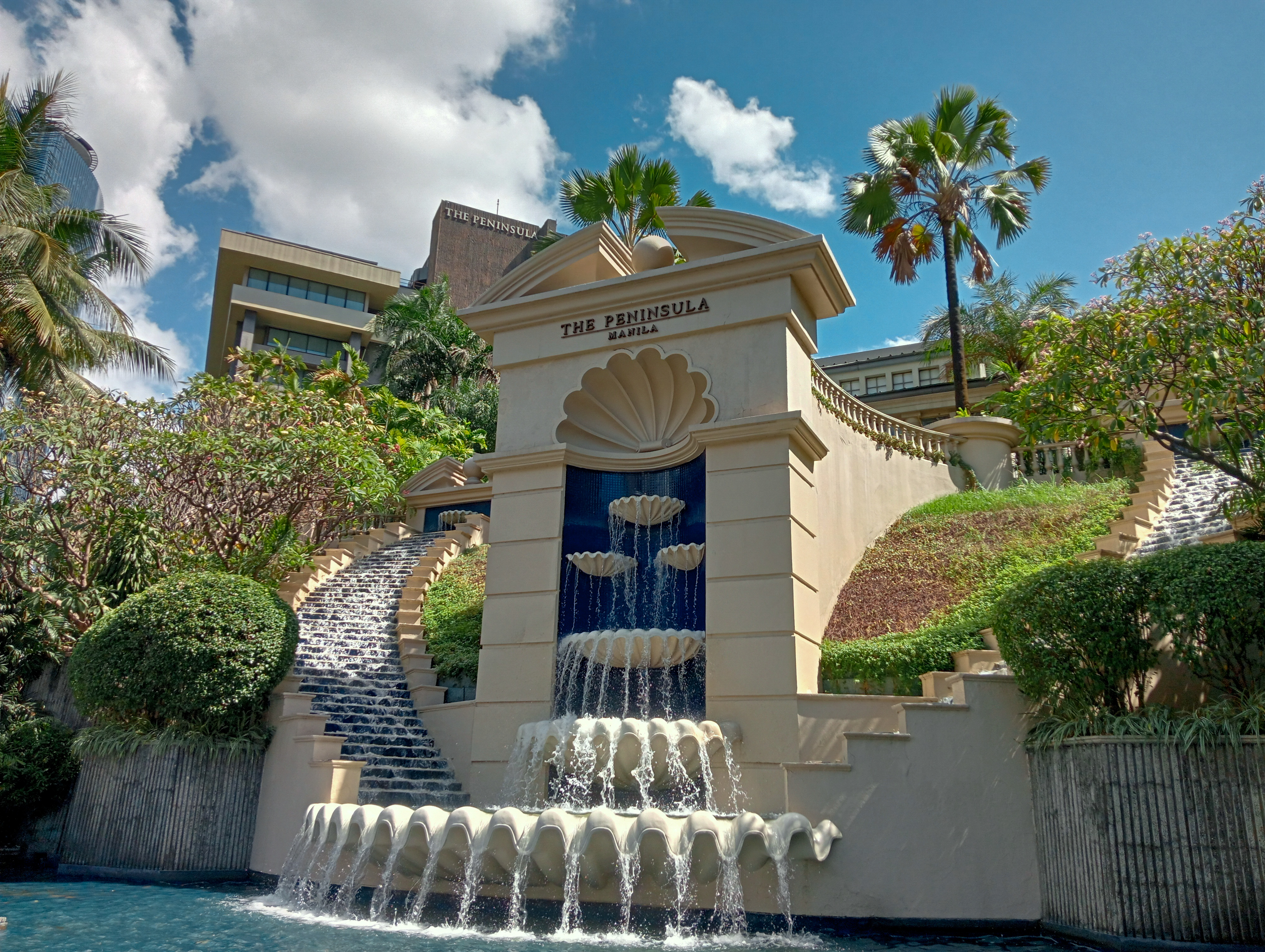
The fountain in February 2024

The Peninsula Manila was opened on September 14, 1976, ahead of that year's International Monetary Fund conference. The hotel's two buildings (or wings) were built on the corners of Ayala and Makati Avenues, after which they are named. In 1994, the hotel was renovated, with a new fountain and some of the hotel walls were painted with new colors.

The Manila Pen consists of two wings, which host all 497 rooms and suites.

In 2000, the hotel's fountain area, fronting the corner of Ayala and Makati Avenues, was the scene of Filipino singer Regine Velasquez for her performance of the country's millennial theme Written In The Sand together with 2,000 children, televised in 67 broadcast networks throughout the world to coincide with midnight in Manila for the BBC's millennium special 2000 Today on GMA Network which it was the official Philippine broadcaster.

== Manila Peninsula siege ==
The Manila Peninsula rebellion occurred on November 29, 2007. Detained Senator Antonio Trillanes IV, General Danilo Lim and other Magdalo officials walked out of their trial and marched through the streets of Makati, called for the ousting of President Gloria Macapagal Arroyo, and seized the second floor of The Peninsula Manila. Former Vice President Teofisto Guingona Jr. also joined the march to the hotel, as well as some of the soldiers from the Armed Forces of the Philippines. The siege was ended after the military stormed the lobby and the second floor where Rizal function room was located and Trillanes was seized.

The lobby of the hotel sustained much damage because of gunfire that rattled through its walls, windows and the main glass door was obliterated by an armored personnel carrier on the assault to serve Trillanes et al. their arrest warrants.

On December 4, 2007, David Batchelor, general manager of the hotel, announced the filing of damage suit within 10 days, as some estimated the damage at US$1.2 million or ₱50.766 million. Meanwhile, even before the reopening, it already received guests’ bookings or 51% room occupancy. The Peninsula Manila is 77% owned by the Hongkong and Shanghai Hotels Limited.

== Popular culture ==
Manila Peninsula at night

The front of the hotel was featured on Detective Conan: Black Iron Submarine.

== See also ==
- The Peninsula Hotels
- The Peninsula Hong Kong
- The Peninsula Tokyo
- The Peninsula Bangkok
