= Kadoorie Farm and Botanic Garden =

Botanical garden in Hong Kong

Coordinates: 22.43351°N 114.11807°E

- Traditional Chinese: 嘉道理農場暨植物園
- Simplified Chinese: 嘉道理农场暨植物园
Transcriptions
Standard Mandarin
- Hanyu Pinyin: Jiādàoli Nóngchǎng jì Zhíwùyuán
Yue: Cantonese
- Jyutping: gaa1 dou6 lei5 nung4 coeng4 kei3 zik6 mat6 jyun4

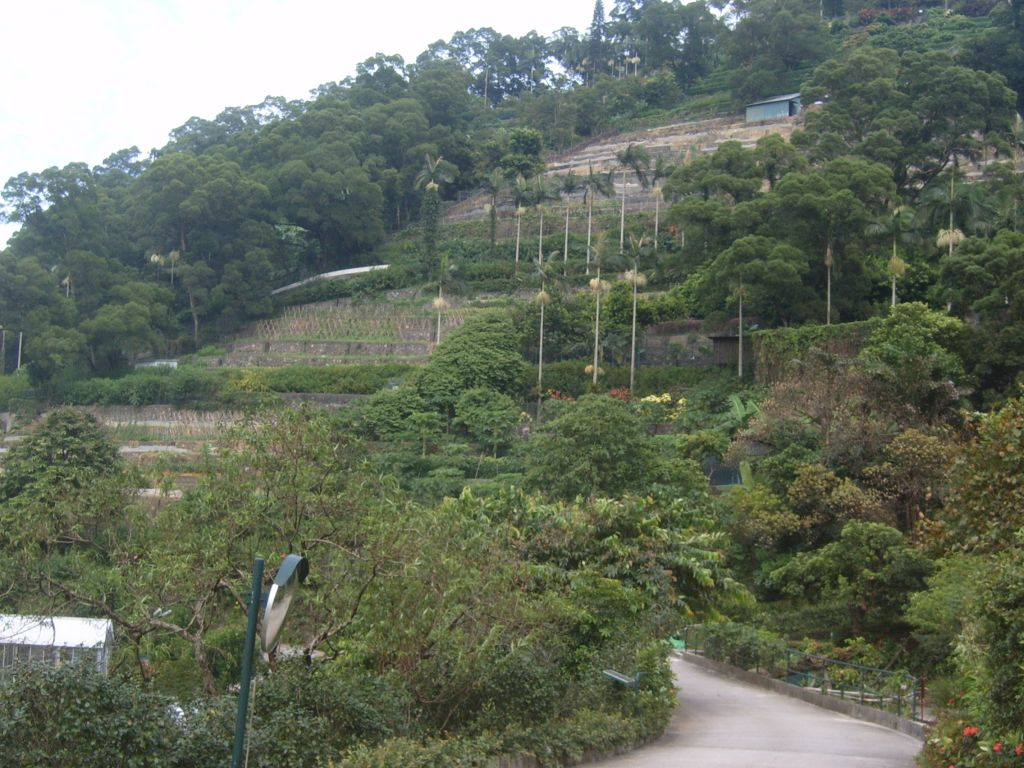
Kadoorie Farm and Botanic Garden

Kadoorie Farm and Botanic Garden (KFBG) (Chinese: 嘉道理農場暨植物園), formerly known as Kadoorie Experimental and Extension Farm (嘉道理試驗及推廣農場), or Kadoorie Farm (嘉道理農場), was originally set up to aid poor farmers in the New Territories in Hong Kong. It later shifted its focus to promote biodiversity conservation in Hong Kong and south China, and greater environmental awareness. It is located near Pak Ngau Shek, encompassing Kwun Yam Shan in the central New Territories; The Farm was built in a valley with streams, woodlands and terraces in 1956 by the Kadoorie Agricultural Aid Association. Now it is managed to integrate nature conservation, including a rescue and rehabilitation programme for native animals, along with holistic education and practices in support of a transition to sustainable living. The farm attracts about 3000 to 5000 visitors per week.

== History ==
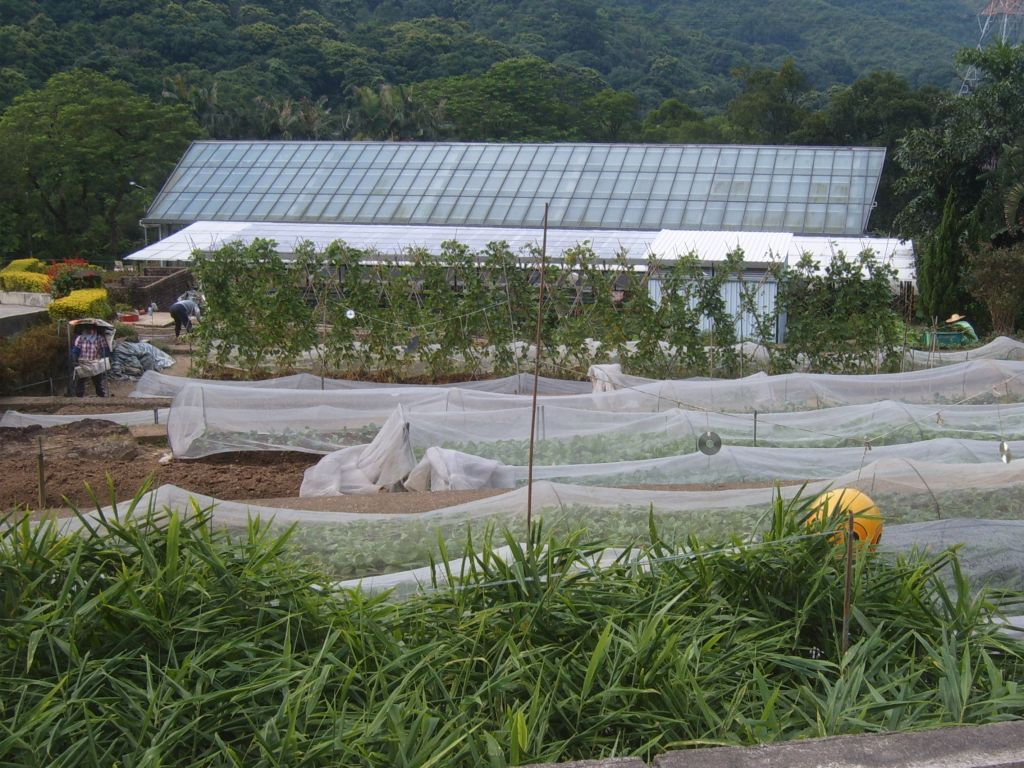
Kadoorie Agriculture

The Kadoorie brothers, Lord Lawrence Kadoorie and Sir Horace Kadoorie, planted the seeds for Kadoorie Farm and Botanic Garden when they founded the Kadoorie Agricultural Aid Association in 1951. The aim of the association was to encourage the right mental outlook by helping people to help themselves through training, supply of agricultural inputs and interest-free loans. In 1956, the association established an experimental and extension farm at Pak Ngau Shek on the present site as a centre for demonstrating crop production and animal husbandry, improving livestock breeds and training local farmers and Hong Kong–based Gurkha soldiers. Special breeds of pigs and chickens were developed which could cope with the local conditions.

On 20 January 1995, the Legislative Council passed an ordinance that established the Kadoorie Farm and Botanic Garden Corporation. This opened the door for a new era of flora and fauna conservation, organic agriculture, creative education and a focus on sustainability in Hong Kong. Its mission is to harmonise our relationship with the environment.

The chairman is Andrew McAulay (son of Ronald McAulay and nephew of Sir Michael Kadoorie); the executive director is Wander Meijer.

== Programmes ==
Programmes run by KFBG's Education Department include tree planting, improving wildlife habitat, art and environment workshops, as well as outreach programmes for schools and the local community. Increasingly there is an emphasis on holistic education, encouraging visitors to explore their relationship with nature by artistic means, internal inquiry, mindfulness and compassion. Meanwhile, through its Sustainable Living & Agriculture Department KFBG works to support community transition by developing new and economically workable opportunities for all parties in the food system. KFBG is actively trying to reduce the ecological footprint of its own operations.

KFBG has a range of biodiversity conservation programmes. Its Ecological Advisory Programme, launched in 1998, advises government, environmental NGOs, villagers, ecological consultants, academics and private developers, seeking to influence policy and practice in support of conservation. The Fauna and Flora Conservation Departments contribute through wildlife rescue work, ex-situ breeding and propagation programmes, and educational projects. KFBG seeks to integrate its multiple management objectives, for biodiversity, ecosystem services and holistic education, on its own 150-hectare estate.

Conservation work has been extended to Mainland China since 1998. Following some pilot surveys in Guangdong and Guangxi in 1997, the KFBG China Programme launched a series of collaborative rapid biodiversity assessments in the nature reserves of Hainan, Guangxi and Guangdong, leading to a series of reports highlighting the distribution, status and threats of the region's wildlife, focusing on vertebrates, plants, dragonflies, ants and some other groups. At the same time the Programme provided a communication platform among those involved in forest conservation in south China through its Living Forests magazine and website. Since 2000 the Programme's attention has gradually shifted to helping protected-areas authorities and communities with the conservation of key sites and species, especially in Hainan and Guangxi . A particular focus has been the great tropical forest of Yinggeling, central Hainan, which is now a provincial Nature Reserve called the Yinggeling National Nature Reserve. Since 2003 KFBG has been involved with conserving the Hainan gibbon (Nomascus hainanus), thought to be the rarest ape in the world, at its last refuge at Hainan Bawangling National Nature Reserve. In 2011 the KFBG China Programme was renamed Kadoorie Conservation China.

== Facilities ==
- T.S. Woo Memorial Pavilion
- Signpost Corner
- Jim Ades Raptor Sanctuary
- Insect House
- Piers Jacobs Wildlife Sanctuary
- Reptile Lookout
- Pigsties
- Sun Garden Animal Exhibit
- Native Mammal Display
- Amphibian and Reptile House
- Wildlife Walkthrough
- Monkey Haven

== See also ==
- List of non-governmental organizations in the People's Republic of China
- Agriculture in Hong Kong
- Lions Nature Education Centre
- List of zoos
- Ocean Park Hong Kong
