= Kadoorie Conservation China =

Department under Kadoorie Farm and Botanic Garden

Kadoorie Conservation China (KCC) is a department under Kadoorie Farm and Botanic Garden, which aims to minimize the loss of biodiversity and promote sustainability in China.

== History ==
The department was first known as the South China Biodiversity Team (SCBT), which was set up in 1998 in response to the urgent threats faced by China's biodiversity particularly in the south. In 2003, it expanded its focus from biodiversity conservation to include promotion of sustainable agriculture and sustainable living, and was restructured to form the China Programme (CP). In 2011, it was again renamed to become Kadoorie Conservation China. The first ten years of the programme were engaged primarily in channelling reliable information about biodiversity and its threats; providing communication and cohesion within the regional conservation community; boosting the ecological capacity of conservation scientists and managers; and initiating conservation interventions, including those that brought benefits to communities around nature reserves.

== Projects ==
=== Yinggeling Nature Reserve, Hainan ===
Yinggeling National Nature Reserve (YGL) sits deep in the interior mountains of Hainan Island, and was never properly studied by scientists before KCC conducted a pilot survey of the area in 2003, when team members discovered extensive primary rainforest biodiversity. In 2005, the Provincial Forestry Department and KCC led a 3-month expedition to study the area's biodiversity value. The team of over 60 specialists discovered a range of biodiversity, including species new to science such as the Yinggeling tree frog (Rhacophorus yinggelingensis), new records for China such as the tree Trigonobalanus verticillata, and over 160 new records for Hainan such as the tree Bretschneidera sinensis and pygmy wren-babbler (Pnoepyga pusilla). These findings underlined the irreplaceable conservation importance of YGL. However, like many other forested areas, the biodiversity value of YGL was slowly being degraded, by illegal activities such as poaching and logging. To preserve this unique biodiversity asset, KCC has supported the Hainan Provincial Forestry Department to develop YGL into a world-class nature reserve, even assigning a conservation biologist to assist in reserve management since 2006. In a span of few years YGL has made progress in reserve management, research & monitoring, and community-based conservation.

=== Hainan Exianling Limestone Ecosystem ===
Since 2004, KCC has been working with partners to study Hainan's limestone forest and its conservation value; researchers supported by KCC found pristine rainforest and uncovered a lot of new species and new China records in this specialised ecosystem. In 2006, KCC and Hainan Provincial Forestry Department co-organized the workshop 'Hainan Limestone Habitats and their Biodiversity' and since 2009 KCC has sponsored the construction of a reserve station, provided capacity building to the local wardens, improved their patrolling effectiveness and provided field equipment.

=== Hainan gibbon ===
In 2003, KCC was invited by the local authorities to take an active role in saving the Hainan gibbon (Nomascus hainanus). The first comprehensive population survey, as well as a conservation workshop for the Hainan gibbon were launched. During the survey and workshop, the existence of only 13 individuals in two groups was confirmed. In a hope to save the species from extinction, together with Bawangling National Nature Reserve, KCC implemented a series of in-situ conservation actions, including improvement of patrolling efficiency, establishment of the gibbon monitoring team, habitat enhancement of lowland habitat, in-depth scientific research, and educational activities. The gibbon population has increased to 3 groups of at least 24 individuals in less than a decade.

=== Eastern black crested gibbon ===
In 2006, the eastern black crested gibbon (Nomascus nasutus) was rediscovered in China by members of KCC after it was thought to be extinct in the country for years.

=== Oriental pied hornbill of Guangxi ===
KCC collaborated with Xidamingshan Nature Reserve and other partners to protect the Oriental pied hornbill (Anthracoceros albirostris) since July 2009. All-round conservation actions have been carried out, including scientific study, education and staff capacity building.

== Publications ==
=== Living Forests ===
Living Forests was a magazine published by KFBG/KCC from 2000 to 2010, to serve the community of conservationists active in South China. From the sixth issue onwards each issue had a particular theme, namely: (6) Community Power in Southwest China; (7) Holding On to Hainan's Forests; (8) Keeping South China's Ecosystems Intact; (9) Benign Harvests: Bringing Agriculture in Line with Biodiversity Conservation; (10) What is Environmental Education? (11) Reforesting South China: Beyond Planting Trees; (12) Roads Least Travelled: Ecotourism and Development in South China; (13) Knowledge to Practice: How can Science be Applied to Conservation Policy and Management?; (14) Countdown 2010: Are We Winning the Battle for Biodiversity?); (15) Full Table, Empty Forest: Can the Wildlife Trade be Controlled?; (16) The Challenge of the Century: Building Resilience to Peak Oil and Climate Change.

=== Sustaining the Pulse ===
Sustaining the Pulse: Managing for Biodiversity Conservation in South China's Forest Nature Reserve provides nature-reserve managers, especially those in the South China region, with the motivation, concepts, guidance and examples to help them in their vital work.
