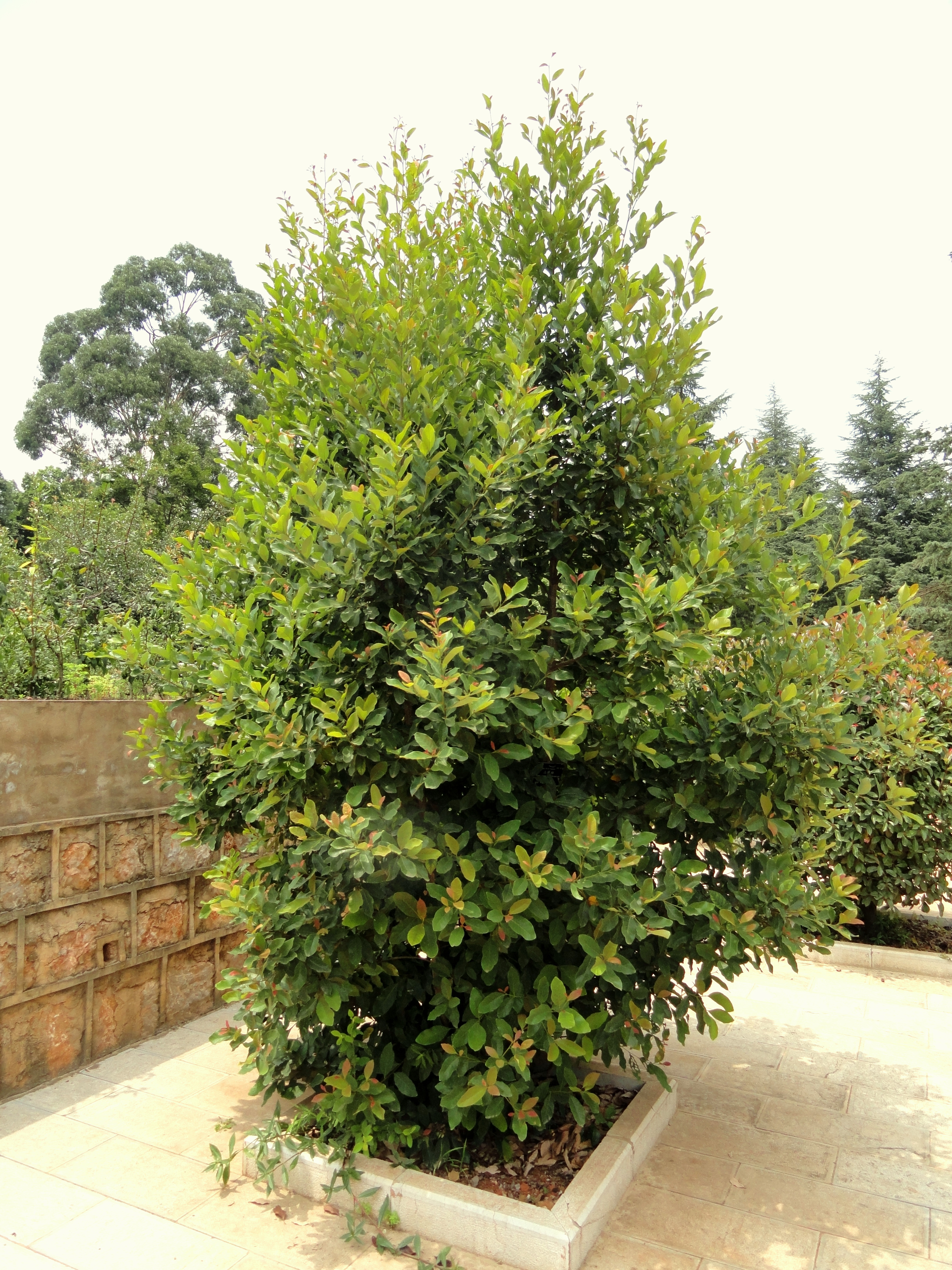

Conservation status
- Endangered (IUCN 3.1)

Scientific classification
- Kingdom: Plantae
- Clade: Tracheophytes
- Clade: Angiosperms
- Clade: Eudicots
- Clade: Rosids
- Order: Fagales
- Family: Fagaceae
- Genus: Trigonobalanus
- Species: T. doichangensis

Binomial name
- Trigonobalanus doichangensis (A.Camus) Forman

Synonyms
- Formanodendron doichangensis (A.Camus) Nixon & Crepet; Quercus doichangensis A.Camus (1933); Quercus daichangensis A.Camus, orth. var.

= Trigonobalanus doichangensis =

Species of tree

Trigonobalanus doichangensis is a species of tree in the family Fagaceae that can reach 21 metres (69 ft) in height. It is only found at few sites in Yunnan in China and at one site in Chiang Rai in Thailand. It is threatened by habitat loss and degradation. In China it is under second-class national protection.
