= Metrojet Ltd =

Airline based in Hong Kong

Metrojet Limited
IATA	ICAO	Call sign
–	MTJ	METROJET
- Founded: 1997; 28 years ago
- Hubs: Hong Kong International Airport
- Secondary hubs: Clark International Airport
- Destinations: Worldwide
- Parent company: Kadoorie family
- Headquarters: Tung Chung, Lantau, Hong Kong
- Key people: Michael Kadoorie (Chairman); Gary Dolski (CEO)
- Website: www.metrojet.com

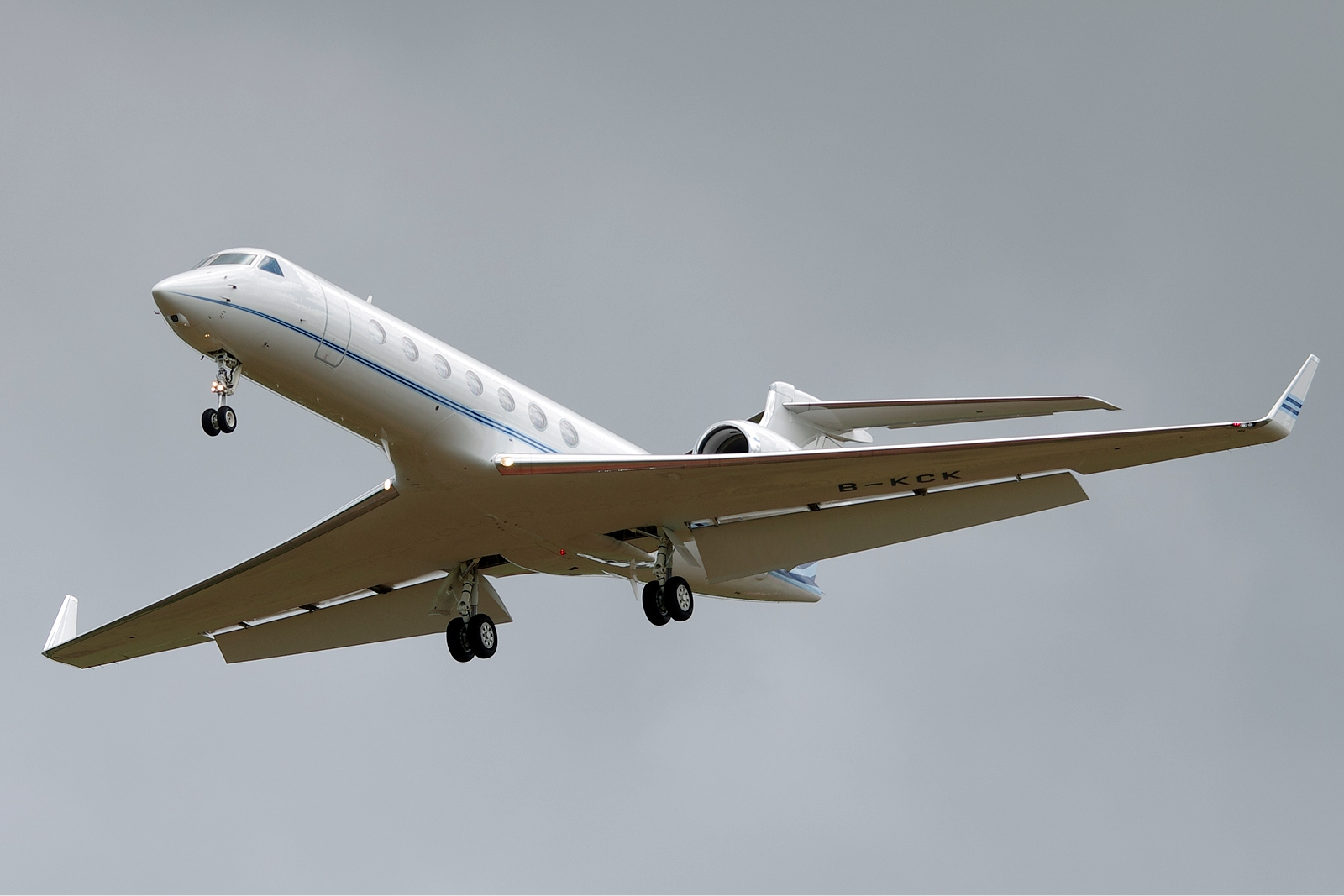
A MetroJet Gulfstream G550 DRW

Metrojet is a Hong Kong provider of business aviation services to users in the Asia Pacific region. Established in 1997, Metrojet pioneered business aviation services in Hong Kong and provides all-inclusive aircraft management, charter, maintenance, and aviation consultancy services. Metrojet also has a regional presence with satellite maintenance base in Clark, the Philippines.

Metrojet HK Maintenance, Repair and Overhaul (MRO) station is Hong Kong CAD, US FAA, Aruba DCA, Bermuda BCAA, Canada TCCA, Cayman Islands CAACI, Isle of Man IoM, Qatar QCAA and San Marino SMAR certified.

== History ==
Metrojet is part of The Kadoorie Group, which includes CLP Holdings, Heliservices (HK) Ltd, and The Peninsula Hotels. The Group has over 30 years business aviation experience in the region, with the establishment of Heliservices in 1978 and Metrojet in 1995.

== Corporate affairs ==
The head office is located in Suites 1303–1306 at One Citygate in Tung Chung. Previously it was at Suite 608 at One Citygate. On a previous occasion the head office was on the ninth floor of the China Hong Kong Tower in Wanchai.

== Fleet ==
Metrojet currently operates a fleet including Gulfstream G450, Gulfstream G550, Gulfstream G650ER, and Boeing Business Jet (BBJ) in the region. They also provide maintenance support to regionally based and transient aircraft.

== Services ==
=== Aircraft management ===
Metrojet assists the aircraft purchaser initially in connection with matters leading to and associated with aircraft registration, certification, inspection and delivery.

Metrojet also acts as the turn-key flight department, providing flight operations, flight crew, aircraft maintenance, regulatory compliance, aviation accounting, insurance and administration as well as pre-delivery assistance.

=== Aircraft maintenance ===
In addition to being a Gulfstream Authorized Warranty Repair Facility, Metrojet also maintains Boeing BBJ.

Metrojet's engineers have Pratt & Whitney, Rolls-Royce, GE and Honeywell aircraft engines and APU type ratings. Metrojet is also recognised as a Pratt & Whitney Authorized Service Facility and Mobile Repair Team, and a Rolls-Royce Authorised Service Facility for BR710 series engine. Their avionics and airframe engineers also have ratings on other aircraft.

=== Aircraft charter ===
Metrojet provides private jet charter services throughout Asia and beyond.
