= Spiralembolus =

Scientific classification
- Kingdom: Animalia
- Phylum: Arthropoda
- Subphylum: Chelicerata
- Class: Arachnida
- Order: Araneae
- Infraorder: Araneomorphae
- Family: Salticidae
- Tribe: Euophryini
- Genus: Spiralembolus; Wang & Li, 2023

Type species
- S. yinggeling Wang & Song, 2023

Species
- 2, see text

Genus of spiders

Spiralembolus is a genus of spiders in the family Salticidae.

== Distribution ==
The genus Spiralembolus is endemic to Hainan, China.

== Etymology ==
The genus name refers to the spiral embolus typical for this genus.

S. yinggeling is named after its type locality, Yinggeling National Nature Reserve in Qiongzhong County. 鹦哥岭; Yīnggē lǐng means "Parrot Ridge". S. yui bears the name of Chinese poet and emperor Li Yu (李煜; Lǐ Yù).

== Species ==
As of January 2026, this genus includes two species:

- Spiralembolus yinggeling Wang & Li, 2023 – China (Hainan)
- Spiralembolus yui Wang & Li, 2023 – China (Hainan)
