= Trigonobalanus excelsa =

Conservation status
- Endangered (IUCN 3.1)

Scientific classification
- Kingdom: Plantae
- Clade: Tracheophytes
- Clade: Angiosperms
- Clade: Eudicots
- Clade: Rosids
- Order: Fagales
- Family: Fagaceae
- Genus: Trigonobalanus
- Species: T. excelsa

Binomial name
- Trigonobalanus excelsa Loz.-Contr., Hern.Com .&Henao-S.

Species of tree

Trigonobalanus excelsa, commonly called the Colombian black oak, is a species of plant in the family Fagaceae. It is a tree endemic to Colombia.

The genus Trigonobalanus is related to the true oaks (Quercus) and includes three known species, T. excelsa and two species native to Southeast Asia.

== Description ==
Trigonobalanus excelsa is a tree which can grow to 20–40 m (66–131 ft) tall.

== Range and habitat ==
Trigonobalanus excelsa is known from five locations in the Colombian Andes. These locations are on different mountain ranges and distant from one another. The species' estimated area of occupancy (AOO) is less than 500 km^{2}.

- The largest population is in Huila Department at the southern end of the Cordillera Oriental. It includes a black oak forest in Cueva de los Guácharos National Natural Park totaling 40,000 ha, and mountaintop black oak groves 50 km north in the towns of Pitalito, Suaza, Timaná, and Acevedo. Black oak is found only on the western slope of the cordillera.
- In Guantentá-Río Fonce Flora and Fauna Sanctuary near Santander in the Cordillera Oriental, in small patches in riparian corridors, among forests of white oak (Quercus humboldtii).
- In the municipalities of Amalfi, Antioquia and Serranía de San Lucas, Bolivar in the Cordillera Central, 600 and 700 km north of the main Huila Department population.
- In Farallones de Cali National Natural Park and in Valle del Cauca in the Cordillera Occidental, about 200 km from the main Huila population.

It grows in humid Andean montane forests between 1,400- and 2,200-meters elevation. It is found in mixed forests and in monospecific stands, typically in areas with steep slopes and poor soils. Some populations grow near forests of white oak (Quercus humboldtii).

== Conservation ==
The species' conservation status is assessed as endangered. It is known from relatively small and isolated populations. Some populations are in protected areas. The main population in Huila is not protected and is threatened with habitat loss from ongoing deforestation. Other populations, like those in Antioquia and Bolivar departments, have been greatly reduced by deforestation, and survive only in remnant forest patches.
