= George Peabody Medal =

Annual music award

The George Peabody Medal, named in honor of George Peabody, is the highest honor bestowed by the Peabody Institute of Johns Hopkins University. The award was stablished in 1980, being presented annually to honor individuals who have made exceptional contributions to music in America, until in 2023 its name was updated as The George Peabody Medal for Outstanding Contributions to Music and Dance in America, in order "to be inclusive of more of the performing arts and to reflect the addition of a Dance degree in Conservatory."

== Recipients ==
2025

- Rakim

2024

- Misty Copeland
- Stevie Wonder

2023

- Terence Blanchard

2022

- Herbie Hancock

2021

- Renée Fleming

2020

- Alex Ross

2019

- Tori Amos

2018

- Leon Fleisher

2016

- Yo-Yo Ma

2015

- Jessye Norman

2014

- Kim Kashkashian

2013
- Pete Seeger

2012
- Roy Haynes
- Benjamin H. Griswold, IV

2011
- Marni Nixon

2010
- Libby Larsen
- James Levine

2009
- Michael M. Kaiser

2008
- Ken Robinson

2007
- Quincy Jones

2006
- Gilbert Kalish

2005
- George Crumb

2004
- John Corigliano

2003
- André Previn

2002
- Richard Goode
- Bobby McFerrin

2001
- Isaac Stern

2000
- Philip Glass

1999
- Eileen Farrell
- Leonard Slatkin

1998
- Anne Wiggins Brown

1997
- Jacques T. Schlenger
- Barry Tuckwell

1996
- David Zinman
- Wynton Marsalis

1995
- Robert O. Pierce
- Melvin A. Steinberg
- Hugo Weisgall

1994
- Jerome Hines
- Mstislav Rostropovich
- Billy Taylor

1993
- Dominick Argento

1992
- Josef Gingold
- Charles Rosen
- Randolph S. Rothschild

1991
- Robert Mann
- Ruth B. Rosenberg
- Eileen Southern

1990
- Steven Muller
- Robert Shaw
- André Watts

1989
- Marilyn Horne

1988
- Wilfred Bain
- David Lloyd Kreeger

1987
- Gian Carlo Menotti
- Oscar Peterson
- Nicolas Slonimsky

1986
- Boris Goldovsky

1985
- Sidney M. Friedberg
- Joseph Meyerhoff
- Julius Rudel
- William Schuman

1984
- Elliott Carter
- Todd Duncan
- William Schwann

1983
- Milton Babbitt
- Ella Fitzgerald
- Paul Fromm

1982
- Elliott W. Galkin
- Benny Goodman
- Gunther Schuller
- Roger Stevens

1981
- Peter Herman Adler
- Marian Anderson
- Carleton Sprague Smith

1980
- Leonard Bernstein
- Eubie Blake
- John Brademas
