= Ken Robinson (educationalist) =

British author, speaker, and education reformer (1950–2020)

Sir Ken Robinson
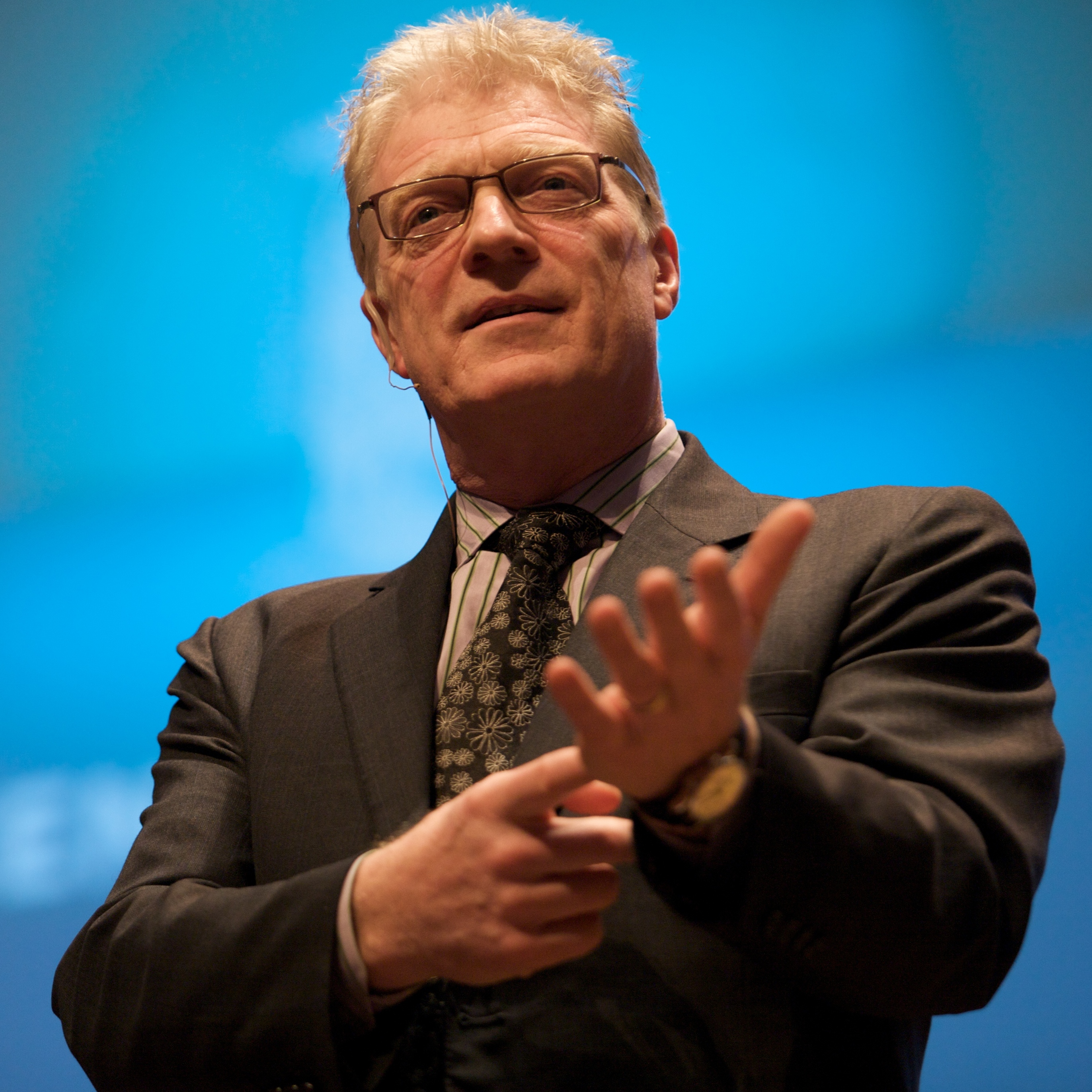
- Ken Robinson speaking in 2009
- Born: Kenneth Robinson; 4 March 1950; Liverpool, England
- Died: 21 August 2020 (aged 70); London, England
- Occupations: Author, speaker, expert on education, education reformer, creativity and innovation
- Spouse: Marie-Therese "Terry" Watts (m. 1982)
- Children: 2

Academic background
- Education: Liverpool Collegiate School; Wade Deacon Grammar School
- Alma mater: Bretton Hall College of Education (BEd); University of London (PhD)
- Thesis: A revaluation of the role and functions of drama teaching in secondary education, with reference to a survey of curricular drama in 259 secondary schools (1981)
- Website: sirkenrobinson.com

Sir Kenneth Robinson (4 March 1950 – 21 August 2020) was a British author, speaker and professor of education sciences. He served as director of Arts in Schools project from 1985 to 1989, then professor of arts education at the University of Warwick until 2001, and as professor emeritus after leaving the university. In 2003, he was knighted for services to the arts.

Originally from a working-class Liverpool family, Robinson moved to Los Angeles with his wife and children around September 2001 to serve as senior advisor to the president of the J. Paul Getty Trust.

== Early life and education ==
Born in Liverpool, to James and Ethel Robinson, he was one of seven children from a working-class background. One of his brothers, Neil, became a professional footballer for Everton, Swansea City and Grimsby Town. After an industrial accident, his father became quadriplegic. Robinson contracted polio at age four and spent 8 months in hospital. He attended Margaret Beavan Special School due to the physical effects of polio, then Liverpool Collegiate School (1961–1963) and Wade Deacon Grammar School, Cheshire (1963–1968). He then studied English and drama (Bachelor of Education – BEd) at Bretton Hall College of Education (1968–1972) and completed a PhD in 1981 at the University of London, researching drama and theatre in education.

== Career and research ==
From 1985 to 1988, Robinson was director of the Arts in Schools Project, an initiative to develop the arts education throughout England and Wales. The project worked with over 2,000 teachers, artists and administrators in a network of over 300 initiatives and influenced the formulation of the National Curriculum for England. During this period, Robinson chaired Artswork, the UK's national youth arts development agency, and worked as advisor to the Hong Kong Academy for Performing Arts.

For twelve years, he was professor of education at the University of Warwick, and became professor emeritus. He has received honorary degrees from the Rhode Island School of Design, Ringling College of Art and Design, the Open University and the Central School of Speech and Drama, Birmingham City University and the Liverpool Institute for Performing Arts. He received the Athena Award of the Rhode Island School of Design for services to the arts and education, the Peabody Medal for contributions to the arts and culture in the United States, the LEGO Prize for international achievement in education, and the Benjamin Franklin Medal of the Royal Society of Arts for contributions to cultural relations between the United Kingdom and the United States. In 2005, he was named as one of Time/Fortune/CNN's "Principal Voices". In 2003, he was made a Knight Bachelor for his services to the arts.

In 1998, he led a UK commission on creativity, education and the economy and his report, All Our Futures: Creativity, Culture and Education, was influential. The Times said of it: "This report raises some of the most important issues facing business in the 21st century. It should have every CEO and human resources director thumping the table and demanding action". Robinson is credited with creating a strategy for creative and economic development as part of the Peace Process in Northern Ireland, publishing Unlocking Creativity, a plan implemented across the region and mentoring to the Oklahoma Creativity Project. In 1998, he chaired the National Advisory Committee on Creative and Cultural Education.

In 2001, Robinson was appointed senior advisor for education and creativity at the Getty Museum in Los Angeles, which lasted at least until 2005.

Robinson gave three TED talks on the importance of creativity in education, which together have been viewed over 100 million times (2023) on the TED website. In April 2013, he gave a talk titled "How to escape education's death valley", in which he outlines three principles crucial for the human mind to flourish – and how current American education culture works against them. At the time of his death in August 2020, his "Do schools kill creativity?" presentation was the most watched TED talk of all time, with 66.3 million views on the TED channel and millions more on YouTube. It has been translated into 62 languages. In 2010, the Royal Society of Arts animated one of Robinson's speeches about changing education paradigms, which has been viewed more than 17 million times on YouTube as of August 2023.

=== Ideas on education ===
Robinson suggested that to engage and succeed, education has to develop on three fronts. Firstly, that it should foster diversity by offering a broad curriculum and encourage individualisation of the learning process. Secondly, it should promote curiosity through creative teaching, which depends on high quality teacher training and development. Finally, it should focus on awakening creativity through alternative didactic processes that put less emphasis on standardised testing, thereby giving the responsibility for defining the course of education to individual schools and teachers. He believed that much of the present education system in the United States encourages conformity, compliance and standardisation rather than creative approaches to learning. Robinson emphasised that we can only succeed if we recognise that education is an organic system, not a mechanical one: successful school administration is a matter of engendering a helpful climate rather than "command and control".

=== Writing ===
Learning Through Drama: Report of the Schools Council Drama Teaching (1977) was the result of a three-year national development project for the UK Schools Council. Robinson was principal author of The Arts in Schools: Principles, Practice, and Provision (1982), now a key text on arts and education internationally. He edited The Arts and Higher Education, (1984) and co-wrote The Arts in Further Education (1986), Arts Education in Europe, and Facing the Future: The Arts and Education in Hong Kong.

Robinson's 2001 book, Out of Our Minds: Learning to be Creative (Wiley-Capstone), was described by Director magazine as "a truly mind-opening analysis of why we don't get the best out of people at a time of punishing change." John Cleese said of it: "Ken Robinson writes brilliantly about the different ways in which creativity is undervalued and ignored in Western culture and especially in our educational systems."

The Element: How Finding Your Passion Changes Everything, was published in January 2009 by Penguin. "The element" refers to the experience of personal talent meeting personal passion. He argues that in this encounter, we feel most ourselves, most inspired, and achieve to our highest level. The book draws on the stories of creative artists such as Paul McCartney, The Simpsons creator Matt Groening, Meg Ryan, and physicist Richard Feynman to investigate this paradigm of success.

=== Publications ===
- 1977 Learning Through Drama: Report of The Schools Council Drama Teaching Project with Lynn McGregor and Maggie Tate. UCL. Heinemann. ISBN 0435185659
- 1980 Exploring Theatre and Education Heinemann ISBN 0435187813
- 1982 The Arts in Schools: Principles, Practice, and Provision, Calouste Gulbenkian Foundation. ISBN 0903319233
- 1984 The Arts and Higher Education. (editor with Christopher Ball). Gulbenkian and the Leverhulme Trust ISBN 0900868899
- 1986 The Arts in Further Education. Department of Education and Science.
- 1998 Facing the Future: The Arts and Education in Hong Kong, Hong Kong Arts Development Council ASIN B002MXG93U
- 1998 All Our Futures: Creativity, Culture, and Education (The Robinson Report). ISBN 1841850349
- 2001 Out of Our Minds: Learning to Be Creative. Capstone. ISBN 1907312471
- Robinson, Ken (2009). The element : how finding your passion changes everything. New York: Viking Press. ISBN 978-0-670-02047-8. OCLC 233549573.
- Robinson, Ken (2013). Finding your element : how to discover your talents and passions and transform your life. New York: Viking Press. ISBN 978-0-670-02238-0. OCLC 829096794.
- Robinson, Ken (2015). Creative schools: the grassroots revolution that's transforming education. New York: Viking. ISBN 978-0-14-310806-1. OCLC 893894810.
- Robinson, Ken (2018). You, your child, and school : navigate your way to the best education
- Robinson, Ken (2022). Imagine If... Creating a Future for us All. Penguin. ISBN 014199097X

=== Awards and honours ===
- 2003 Knighted for his life's work.
- 2004 Companionship of Liverpool Institute for Performing Arts
- 2008 Governor's Award for the Arts in Pennsylvania
- 2008 Gheens Foundation Creativity and Entrepreneurship Award
- 2008 George Peabody Medal
- 2008 Benjamin Franklin Medal from the Royal Society of Arts
- 2008 Honorary Degree from Birmingham City University
- 2009 Honorary Doctor of Fine Arts from the Rhode Island School of Design (RISD)
- 2011 Gordon Parks Award for Achievements in Education
- 2012 Arthur C. Clarke Imagination Award
- 2012 Honorary Doctor of Humane Letters from Oklahoma State University
- Honorary Fellow of the Central School of Speech and Drama

== Personal life ==
In 1977, Robinson met Marie-Therese "Terry" Watts, while delivering a course in Liverpool. They married in 1982 and had two children, James and Kate.

Robinson died on 21 August 2020, aged 70, at his home in London. According to his daughter, Robinson died of cancer.
