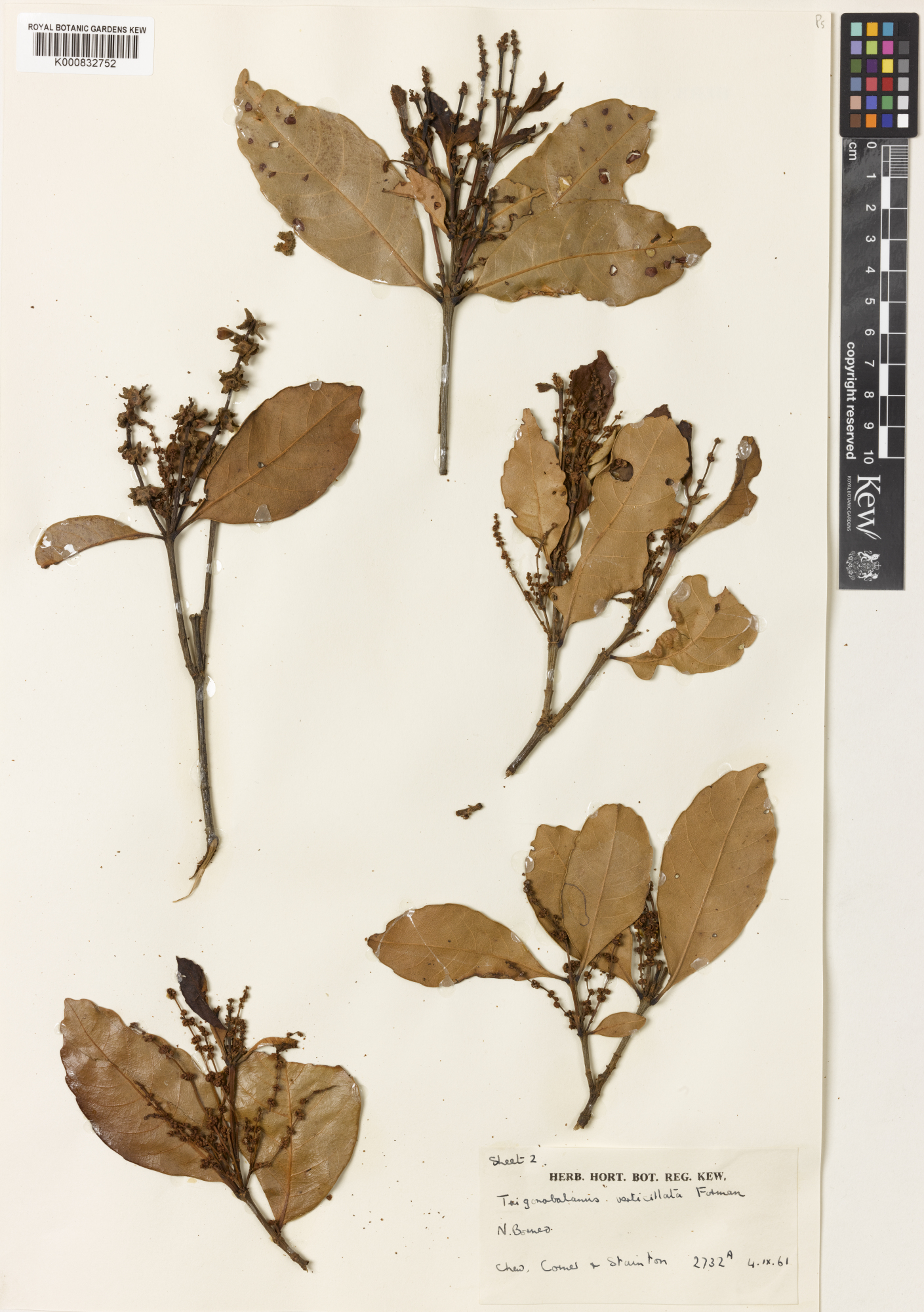

Conservation status
- Near Threatened (IUCN 3.1)

Scientific classification
- Kingdom: Plantae
- Clade: Embryophytes
- Clade: Tracheophytes
- Clade: Spermatophytes
- Clade: Angiosperms
- Clade: Eudicots
- Clade: Rosids
- Order: Fagales
- Family: Fagaceae
- Genus: Trigonobalanus
- Species: T. verticillata

Binomial name
- Trigonobalanus verticillata Forman

= Trigonobalanus verticillata =

Species of tree

Trigonobalanus verticillata is a species of plant in the family Fagaceae. It is a tree native to Borneo, Sumatra, Sulawesi, the Malay Peninsula, and Hainan.

== Description ==
Trigonobalanus verticillata is a tree which grows to 10–20 m (33–66 ft) tall. The trunk has a diameter of up to 70 cm (28 in) at breast height. It fruits between October and March.

== Range and habitat ==
Trigonobalanus verticillata is native to the highlands of Borneo, Sumatra, Sulawesi, the Malay Peninsula, and Hainan.

It is found in tropical montane rain forest and evergreen broadleaf forest in Indonesia and Malaysia, and in tropical moist monsoon forest on Hainan, at elevations of 900–2,000 m (3,000–6,600 ft).

On Hainan, it is often found with the trees Castanopsis tonkinensis, Lithocarpus fenzelianus, Liquidambar obovata, and Dacrydium pectinatum.

== Conservation ==
The species' conservation status is assessed as near threatened. It is threatened with habitat loss and fragmentation from deforestation, and its population is declining.
