= Andrew McAulay =

Hong Kong businessman

- Born: Andrew James Kadoorie McAulay
- Citizenship: British
- Education: Harrow School; Wadham College, Oxford (BA)
- Parent(s): Ronald James McAulay; Rita Laura Kadoorie
- Relatives: Sir Michael Kadoorie (uncle)

Andrew James Kadoorie McAulay is a Hong Kong businessman, philanthropist and conservationist who has chaired the board of Kadoorie Farm and Botanic Garden (KFBG) since December 1999. He helps to oversee the McAulay family's substantial stake in CLP Holdings, as well as charitable stakes held jointly with other family members.

McAulay is a director of Sir Elly Kadoorie & Sons Limited, which oversees the broader family's interests in property, textiles and aviation, among others. He is also a trustee of several Kadoorie family foundations, and chairs the board of Partnerships for Community Development (PCD), a sister organisation of KFBG.

A member of the Kadoorie family, he is the son of Ronald McAulay and Rita Laura McAulay (née Kadoorie), and a grandson of Lawrence Kadoorie, Baron Kadoorie.

== Early life ==
McAulay was born in Hong Kong and educated at Kowloon Junior School in Hong Kong before moving to England at the age of eight, where he attended Elstree School and Harrow School. He read law at Wadham College, Oxford, graduating in 1989.

His mother, Rita, is the daughter of his grandfather Lord Kadoorie and the sister of his uncle, Sir Michael Kadoorie. His father, Ronald McAulay, was a non-executive director of The Hongkong and Shanghai Hotels for more than 45 years until 2017. He also joined the board of CLP, then China Light & Power, in 1968.

He is a grand-nephew of Sir Horace Kadoorie, who founded the Kadoorie Agricultural Aid Association with Lawrence Kadoorie in 1951. As a child he regularly visited KFBG with his great-uncle Horace. In his early twenties he spent time at meditation centres in the United States and India before returning to Hong Kong.

== Career and Kadoorie Farm and Botanic Garden ==
The Kadoorie Agricultural Aid Association set up an experimental and extension farm at Pak Ngau Shek in 1956 to train local farmers. On 20 January 1995 the Legislative Council passed an ordinance incorporating the Kadoorie Farm and Botanic Garden Corporation as a non-profit conservation and education centre.

McAulay became its first executive director and oversaw its shift from agricultural aid to nature conservation and education. He was appointed chairperson of the board in December 1999.

KFBG extended its work into mainland China in 1998. Since 2003 it has worked with Bawangling National Nature Reserve in Hainan to conserve the Hainan gibbon. The population rose from 13 in 2003 to 42, in seven family groups, by late 2024.

Its Wild Animal Rescue Centre has rescued more than 76,000 wild animals since 1994. KFBG is primarily privately funded by the Kadoorie Foundation.

In January 2026, at the start of KFBG's 70th anniversary year, McAulay officiated with Chief Secretary Eric Chan at the opening of the Jockey Club Nature Conservation Centre. The centre houses more than 100 scientists and other professionals working on conservation, sustainable living and education.

KFBG's forest restoration programme was the first in the world to receive premium tier certification under the Global Biodiversity Standard.

KFBG also runs the Green Hub in Tai Po, a sustainable living centre in the restored Old Tai Po Police Station, which received an Honourable Mention in the 2016 UNESCO Asia-Pacific Awards for Cultural Heritage Conservation.

== Philanthropy and public roles ==
McAulay is a trustee of the Kadoorie Foundation, the charitable trust founded by Sir Horace Kadoorie in 1970.

In the late 1990s he joined the board of CLP.

Partnerships for Community Development, a Hong Kong charity set up in 2001 and funded by the Kadoorie Foundation, works on ecological agriculture, biodiversity conservation and community building in mainland China and Hong Kong. McAulay chairs its board.

== Writing and ecological thinking ==
McAulay is a contributor to UK-based Resurgence & Ecologist magazine. His 2014 article, "Embracing the Wild", followed an expedition to the Tshuapa Lomami Lualaba region of the Congo in September 2013, at the invitation of the Arcus Foundation.

He wrote Little Fish, a story inspired by the Kwun Yum Shan mountain at KFBG, which was developed into a long-running KFBG workshop and produced as a shadow play with the Taiwan Taiyuan Puppet Theatre Company.

He has published two books of poetry. He teaches meditation and is a breathwork facilitator.

Since 2010, McAulay has hosted numerous talks, workshops and retreats at KFBG. In April 2025 he held a public dialogue with renowned British spiritual ecologist Satish Kumar as part of KFBG's Kadoorie Earth Programme, and a second in 2026 for KFBG's 70th anniversary.
