= Cueva de los Guácharos =

National park in Colombia

- IUCN category II (national park)
- Location within Colombia
- Location: Huila & Caqueta, Colombia
- Nearest city
- Coordinates: 1°33′N 76°8′W
- Area: 90.78 km^{2} (35.05 sq mi)
- Established: November 9, 1960
- Governing body: SINAP

Cueva de los Guácharos National Natural Park (English: Cave of the Oilbirds) is the oldest national park in Colombia. Located in the western face of the Colombian Eastern Andean Range in the departments of Huila and Caquetá, the park covers an area of 9,000 hectares (90 km^{2}; 35 sq mi). The caves formed from the karstic zones of the Magdalena and Caquetá rivers.

The park is intended to protect the cloud forest and páramo ecosystems, as well as one of the world's largest and most accessible colony of namesake oilbirds. This area hosts one of the last intact oak forests in the country, with the native oak species Quercus humboldtii (Bonpl.) and Trigonobalanus excelsa (Lozano, 1979)

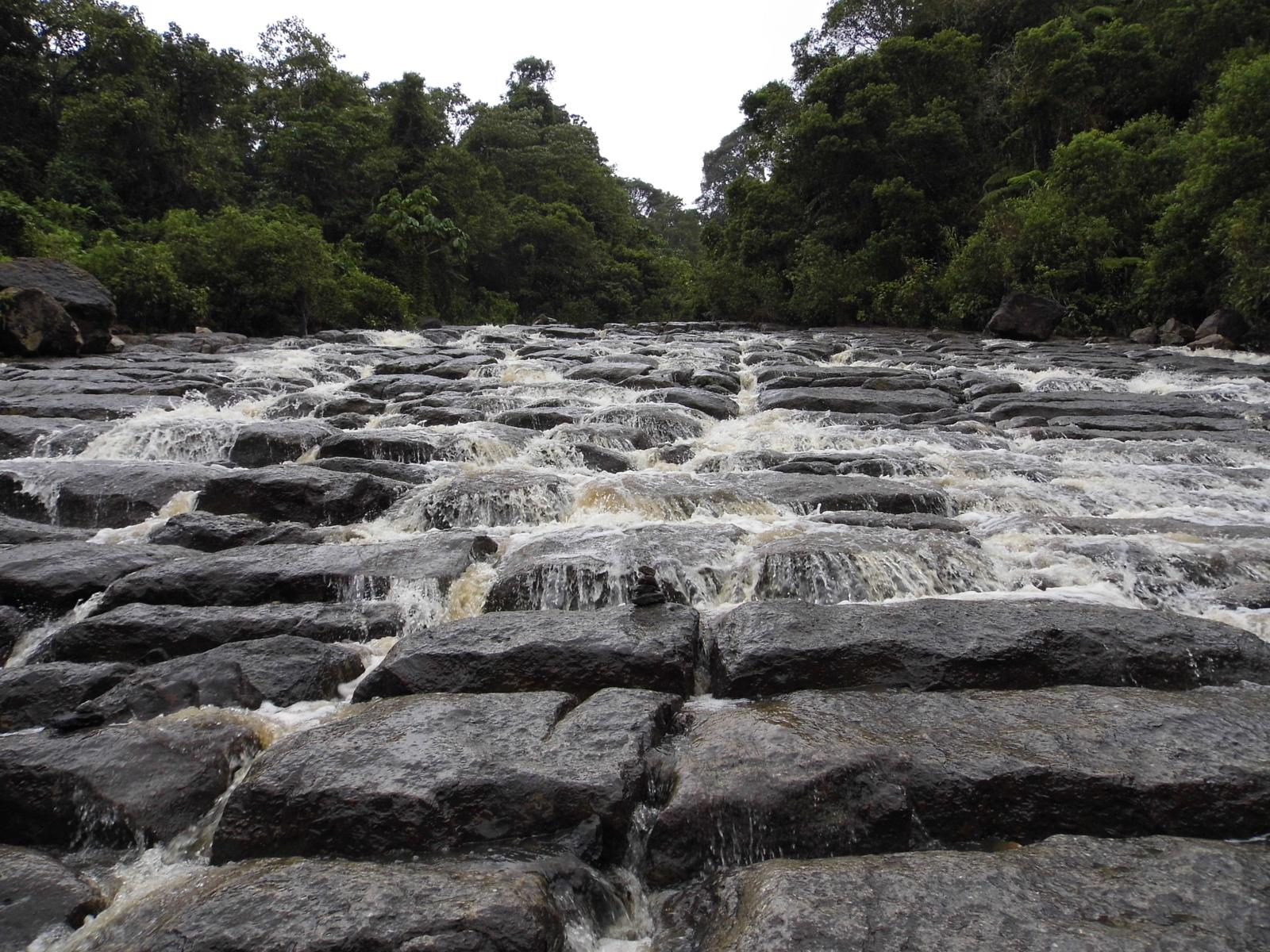

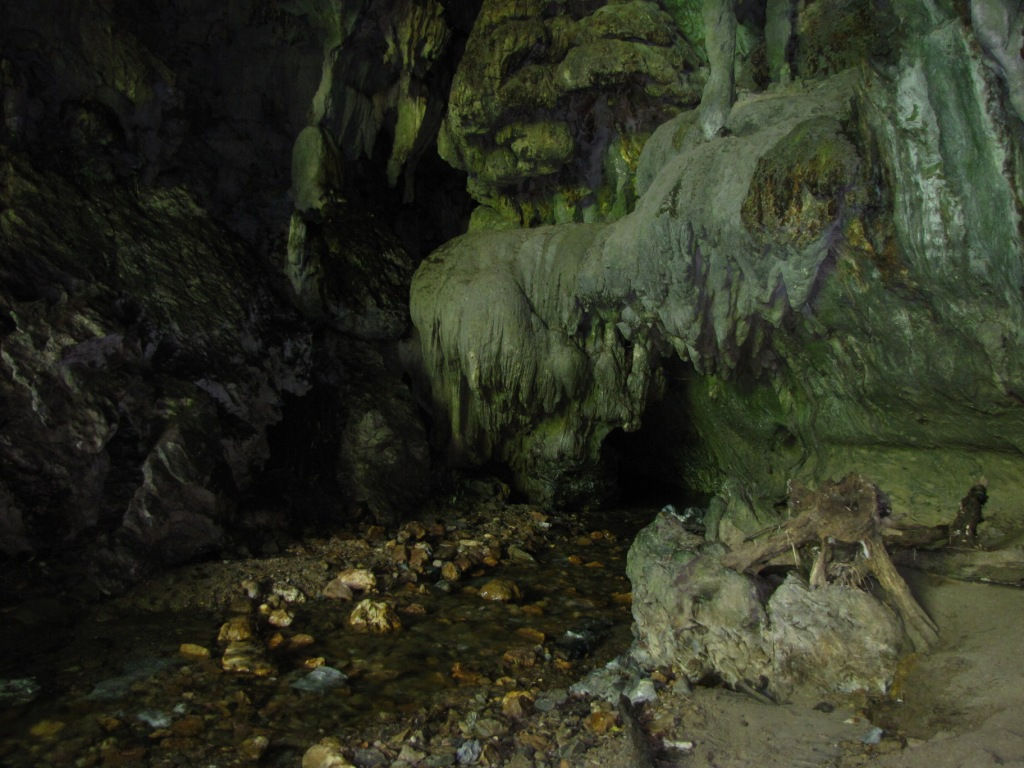

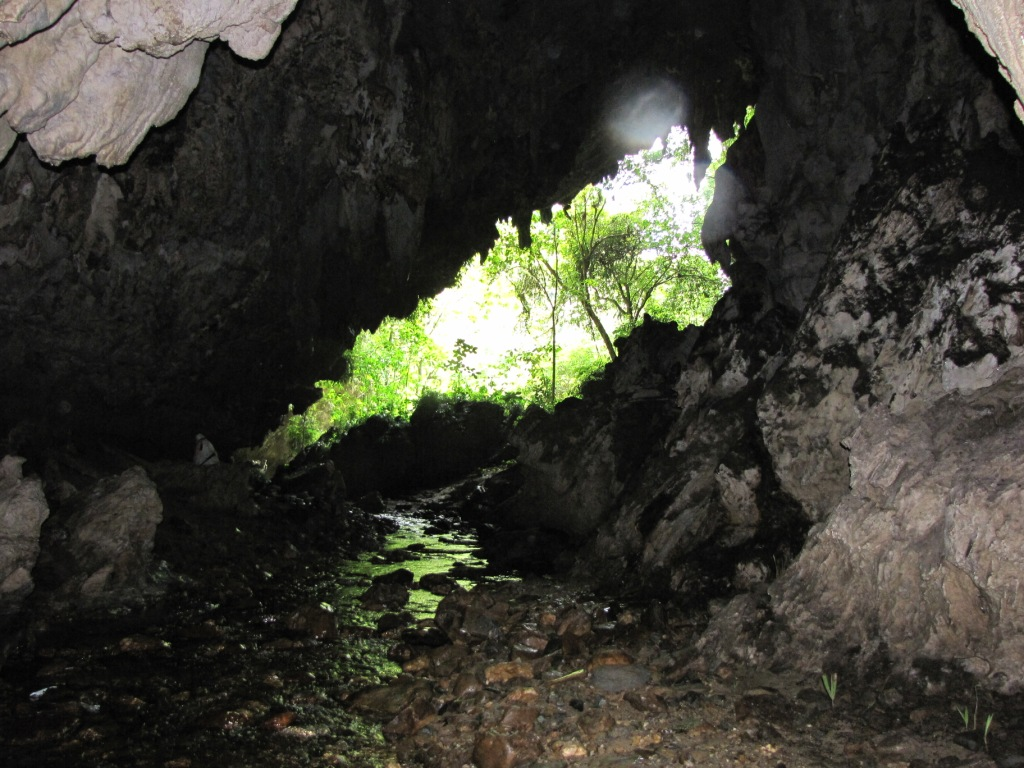

== Biodiversity ==
In 2005, the National Natural Parks System identified 296 registered species of birds in the park. Further recorded species are:

Biodiversity in Cueva de los Guácharos
Species	Family	Common name	Range	Conservation status
Lagothrix lagotricha lugens (Humboldt)	Cebidae/Atelinae	Churuco monkey	High Amazon valley	vunerable
Cebus apella (Linnaeus)	Cebidae/Cebinae	corn monkey	Andes\Amazonas	least concern
Ateles paniscus (Linnaeus)	Cebidae/Atelinae	marimonda	mid and low Amazon valley	vunerable
Mazama americana (Erxleben)	Cervidae/Odocoileinae	páramo deer	Neotropic	data deficient
Mazama rufina (Lesson)	Cervidae/Odocoileinae	páramo deer		vunerable
Pudu mephistophiles (De Winton)	Cervidae/Odocoileinae	rabbit deer	North Andean: northern Ecuador to southern Colombia	data deficient
Tapirus pinchaque (Roulin)	Tapiridae	páramo tapir	North Andean: northern Ecuador to southern Colombia	threatened
