= Ronald McAulay =

Hong Kong billionaire businessman (born 1935/1936)

- Born: 1935 or 1936 (age 89–90)
- Citizenship: United Kingdom
- Education: Gordonstoun School
- Board member of: Hongkong and Shanghai Hotels
- Spouse: Rita Laura Kadoorie
- Children: Andrew McAulay
- Relatives: Sir Michael Kadoorie (brother-in-law)

Ronald James McAulay (born 1935/1936) is a Scottish/Hong Kong billionaire businessman.

== Education ==
McAulay has a master's degree from the University of Glasgow.

== Career ==
McAulay qualified as an accountant, and is a member of the Institute of Chartered Accountants of Scotland.

McAulay has large holdings in, and has sat on the boards of Hongkong and Shanghai Hotels since 1972, and CLP Group since 1968. As of November 2015, Forbes estimated his net worth at US$2.6 billion.

== Personal life ==
McAulay is married to Rita Laura McAulay, the daughter of The Lord Kadoorie and sister of fellow Hong Kong billionaire Sir Michael Kadoorie, and they live in Hong Kong. They have a son, Andrew James Kadoorie McAulay, who has been chairman of Kadoorie Farm and Botanic Garden since 1999.
