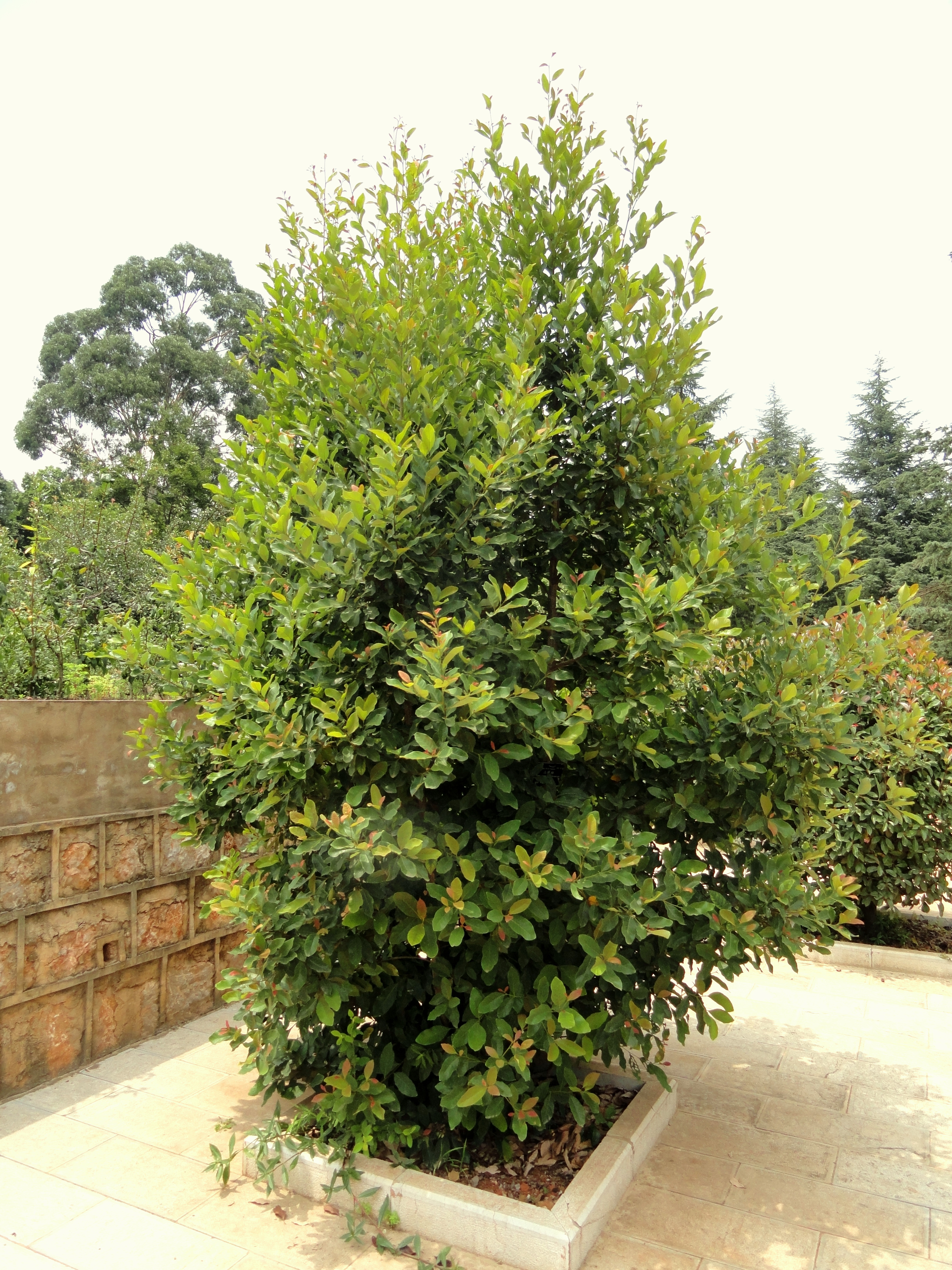
- Trigonobalanus doichangensis

Scientific classification
- Kingdom: Plantae
- Clade: Tracheophytes
- Clade: Angiosperms
- Clade: Eudicots
- Clade: Rosids
- Order: Fagales
- Family: Fagaceae
- Subfamily: Quercoideae
- Genus: Trigonobalanus; Forman

Species
- See text

Synonyms
- Colombobalanus Nixon & Crepet; Formanodendron Nixon & Crepet

= Trigonobalanus =

Genus of flowering plants in the family Fagaceae

Trigonobalanus is a genus of three species of evergreen trees in the family Fagaceae, related to oaks, beeches and chestnuts. The species are widely scattered, with one in northern South America and two in southeast Asia; some botanists treat the three species in separate genera. The three species, with their authors, major synonyms, and distribution, are:

- Trigonobalanus doichangensis (A.Camus) Forman (syn. Formanodendron doichangensis (A.Camus) Nixon & Crepet) – subtropical Yunnan to northern Thailand
- Trigonobalanus excelsa Lozano, Hern. Cam. & Henao (syn. Colombobalanus excelsa (Lozano, Hern. Cam. & Henao) Nixon & Crepet) – endemic to Colombia
- Trigonobalanus verticillata Forman – tropical Indonesia and the Malay Peninsula

The genus name derives from Ancient Greek τρίγωνος (trígōnos, "three-cornered") and βάλανος (bálanos, "acorn").
