= Heliservices =

Hong Kong-based helicopter operator

Heliservices (HK) Ltd.
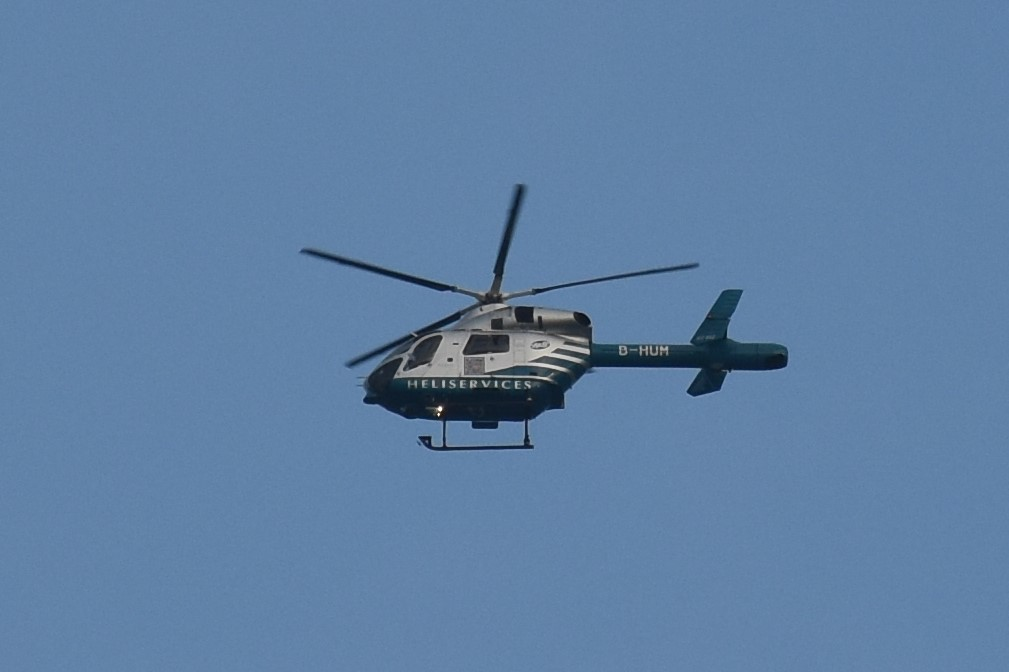
- An MD 902 Explorer operated by Heliservices
IATA	ICAO	Call sign
--	—	—
- Founded: 1978; 47 years ago
- AOC #: 3
- Operating bases: Shek Kong
- Fleet size: 3
- Headquarters: Hong Kong

Heliservices (HK) Ltd is a Hong Kong–based helicopter operator operating local and cross-border passenger charters and sightseeing services, including services from the rooftop helipad of the Peninsula Hotel in Kowloon, and from the Business Aviation Centre at Hong Kong International Airport. It also provides lifting and construction works services, aerial power line insulator washing for Hong Kong's power supply companies, and filming and photography services. The company has an operations and maintenance base near Shek Kong in the New Territories.

Heliservices is part of the Kadoorie group of companies, which also includes the Peninsula Hotels chain, and has significant holdings in CLP Holdings, one of Hong Kong's power supply companies. The Kadoorie group is owned by the Kadoorie family, and Sir Michael Kadoorie is chairman of Heliservices.

Heliservices was established in 1978, following the purchase of Hong Kong's first private helicopter by Michael Kadoorie.

== Fleet ==
Heliservices operates:

- Four MD Helicopters MD 902 Explorer
