= Kadoorie Agricultural Aid Association =

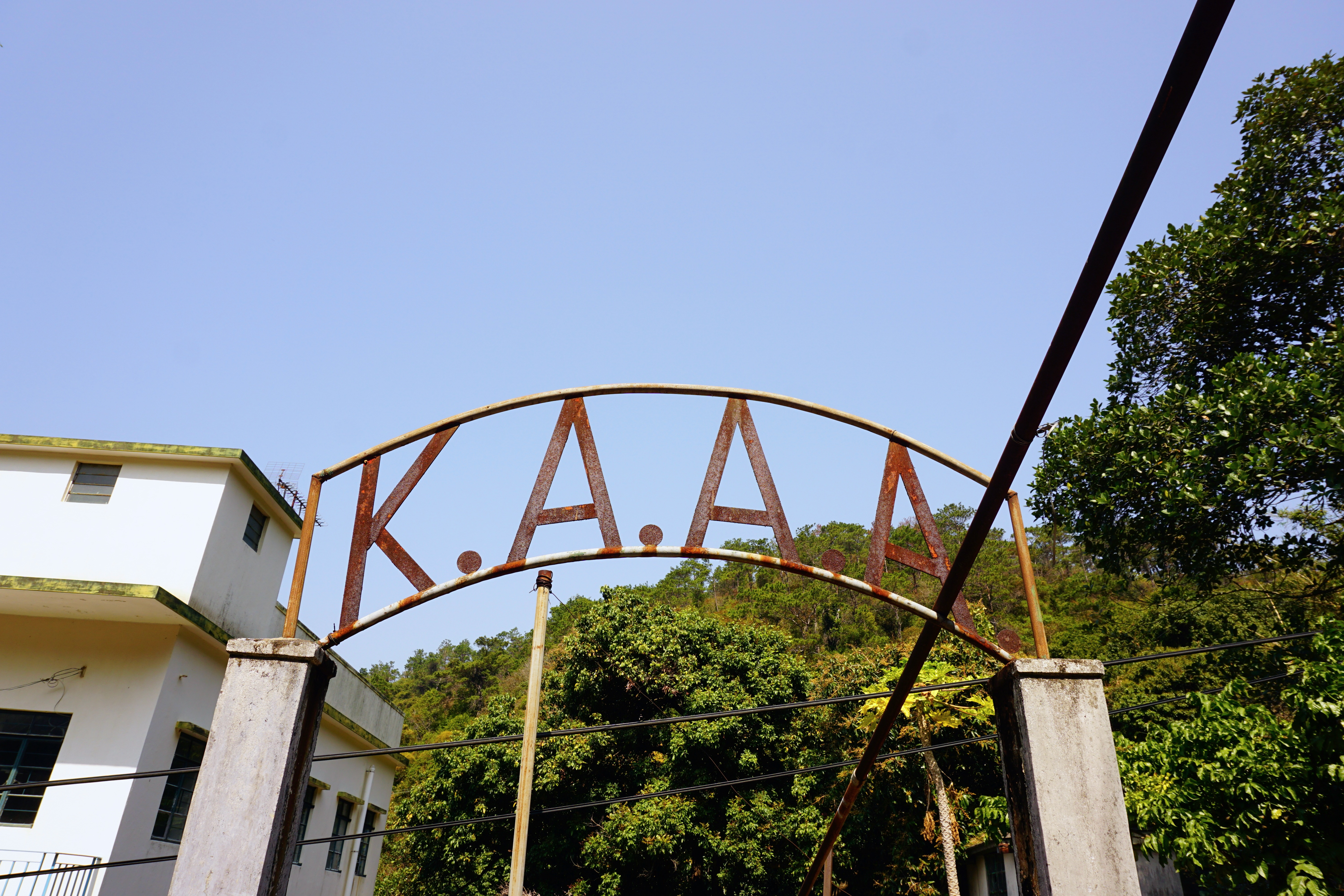
KAAA gate sign on Lantau Island.

The Kadoorie Agricultural Aid Association (KAAA) (Chinese: 嘉道理農業輔助會) was founded in 1951 in Hong Kong by two businessmen, Lawrence and Horace Kadoorie, to help destitute refugees transform their lives through various agricultural programmes.

== See also ==
- Kadoorie Farm and Botanic Garden
