= Zhangixalus yinggelingensis =

Conservation status
- Vulnerable (IUCN 3.1)

Scientific classification
- Kingdom: Animalia
- Phylum: Chordata
- Class: Amphibia
- Order: Anura
- Family: Rhacophoridae
- Genus: Zhangixalus
- Species: Z. yinggelingensis

Binomial name
- Zhangixalus yinggelingensis Chou, Lau, and Chan, 2007

Synonyms
- Rhacophorus yinggelingensis Chou, Lau, and Chan, 2007

Species of frog

Zhangixalus yinggelingensis (Yinggeling treefrog) is a species of frog in the family Rhacophoridae endemic to Yinggeling National Nature Reserve, Hainan, China.

== Description ==
Zhangixalus yinggelingensis is a medium-sized treefrog with a green body with some white spots. Its snout-vent length is about 43 mm (1.7 in). The inner surfaces of the legs are yellow or reddish in color. The iris of the eye is silver in color with some gold color on the top. The frog's call resembles "Auuu."

== Distribution ==
Zhangixalus yinggelingensis is currently only known from the Yinggeling mountain range in central Hainan at altitudes between 1,300 and 1,550 m (4,270 and 5,090 ft). It appears to be a montane species restricted to primary rain forest. It breeds in rainwater pools, which are rare in its mountainous habitat.

== Conservation ==
The species occurs within the Yinggeling National Nature Reserve. The high-altitude montane habitat is relatively undisturbed, but the species is rare and the total area of the habitat is small. IUCN considers Zhangixalus yinggelingensis as "vulnerable". Survey of the reserve has put the estimated total population size at around 3000 frogs.

== Etymology ==
The name of the genus honors Zhang Ya-Ping from the Chinese Academy of Sciences, in recognition to his contributions to biodiversity and evolution research in China, in combination with ixalus, a common generic root for treefrogs. Its specific name refers to the type locality, Yinggeling, a mountain range in central Hainan.
