= Michael Kadoorie =

Hong Kong entrepreneur and philanthropist

The Honourable Sir Michael Kadoorie GBS
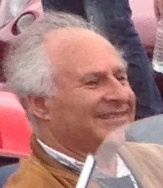
- Born: 1941 (age 84–85); Hong Kong
- Education: Institut Le Rosey
- Occupation: Businessman
- Known for: 18% owner of CLP Group; 47% owner of Hongkong and Shanghai Hotels; Founder and owner of Metrojet Ltd and Heliservices
- Title: Chairman, CLP Group
- Spouse: Betty Tamayo
- Children: 3
- Parent(s): Lawrence Kadoorie, Baron Kadoorie; Muriel Gubbay
- Relatives: Ronald McAulay (brother-in-law); Andrew McAulay (nephew)

Sir Michael David Kadoorie GBS (born 1941) is a Hong Kong billionaire businessman, and the chairman and 18% owner of CLP Group, Hong Kong's largest electricity producer. He also owns 47% of Hongkong and Shanghai Hotels. He is a member of the Kadoorie family.

== Early life ==
Born in 1941, to the Jewish Kadoorie family, the son of business tycoon Lawrence Kadoorie (1899–1993) and his wife, Muriel Gubbay, Kadoorie was educated at Kowloon Junior School in Hong Kong, as well as Institut Le Rosey in Switzerland. His family's roots in business in the Far East go back to his grandfather Elly Kadoorie, a descendant of Iraqi Jews originally from Baghdad, who first settled in Shanghai in 1880. His grandfather made a fortune in Shanghai, mostly lost in 1949, and later, in Hong Kong through finance, real estate and utilities. Headquartered in Hong Kong soon after 1949, Kadoorie's father and uncle Horace Kadoorie expanded the family businesses into a diversified group, led by the company flagship CLP Holdings Ltd.

== Career ==
Kadoorie is the chairman of CLP Holdings Ltd. which his family founded in 1890 and in which they still hold a 35% stake. The utility company provides electricity to 75% of Hong Kong as sole operator (licensed through a Scheme of Control) in Kowloon and the New Territories, and has equity interests in power plants in China, Southeast Asia and Australia.

He is also the chairman of the family's second largest listed group, Hong Kong and Shanghai Hotels, owners and operators of the Peninsula Hotel Group. He controls the companies Metrojet Ltd and Heliservices (HK) Ltd as well.

He donated £10 million to St Catherine's College, Oxford, which will provide accommodation for the college's postgraduate students and house the Collection of the Bodleian Library.

== Awards ==
A trustee of the Kadoorie Charitable Foundation, Kadoorie was made an Officer of the Legion of Honour by the government of France and a Commander of the Order of Léopold II of Belgium. He was awarded a knighthood, as a Knight Bachelor, in the Queen's Birthday Honours List in June 2005. In 2004, the University of Hong Kong awarded him an honorary doctorate.

== Car collector ==
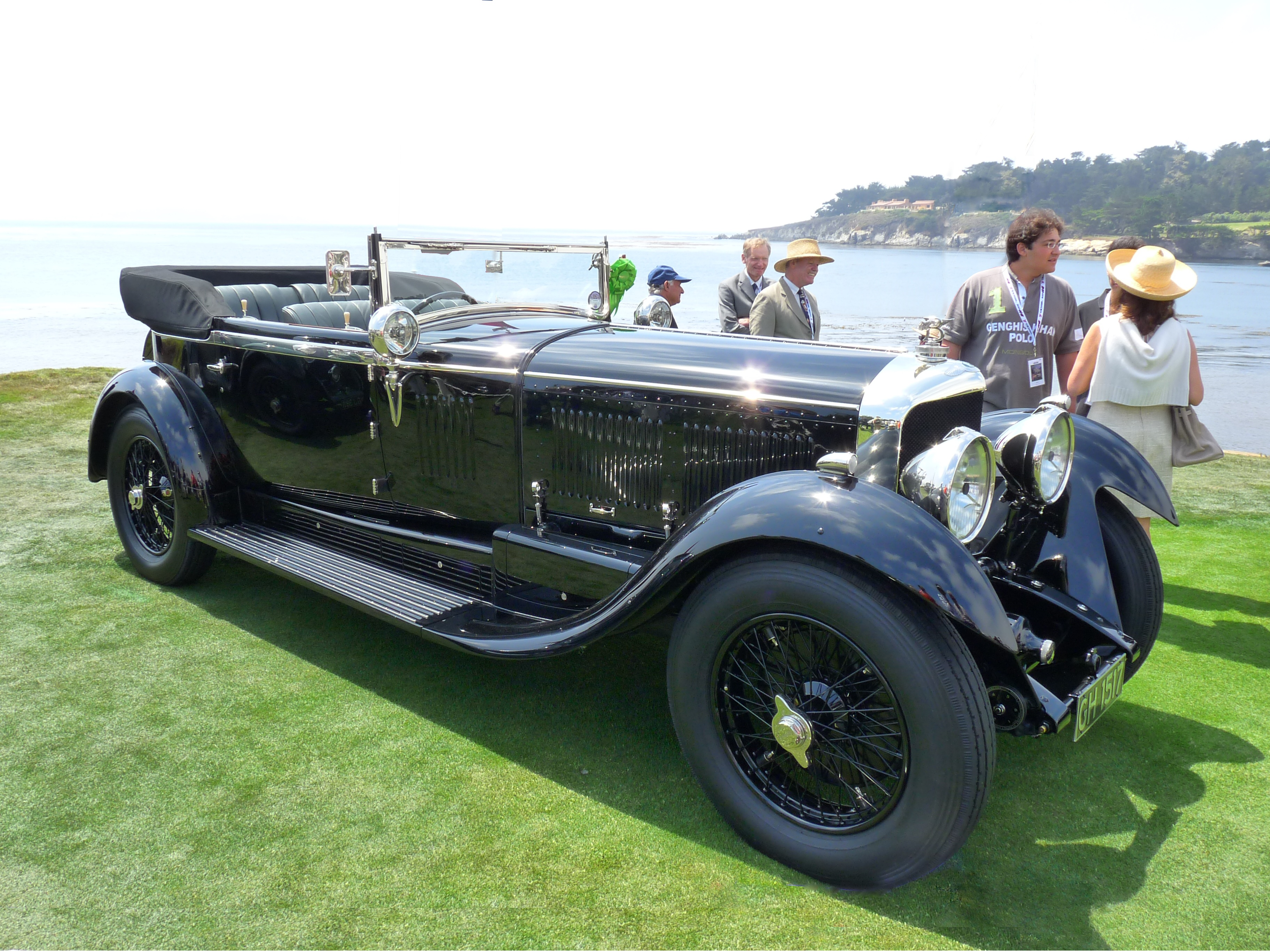
Sir Michael's Bentley Speed Six Mulliner drophead coupé

A photography buff, Kadoorie is also a helicopter pilot and a collector of classic cars. He is the owner of a number of rare automobiles, including a Bugatti Type 57, a 1932 Rolls-Royce Phantom II by Thrupp & Maberly, a 1934 Hispano-Suiza J12 Vanvooren Cabriolet, a 1969 Lamborghini Miura P400 S, a 1924 Vauxhall 30–98 Tourer, a Talbot T150 CSS Pourtout coupé (ex car of race driver "Pagnibon"), a Rolls-Royce Phantom III with Gurney Nutting body, and a Rolls-Royce Silver Ghost.

In 1998, he spent two months recovering from serious injuries at the John Radcliffe Hospital in Oxford, England after an accident in his vintage Ferrari when the spokes in two of the rebuilt wheels tore through the tyres.

== Personal life ==
Michael Kadoorie lived in Hong Kong with his Cuban-American wife, Betty Tamayo, known as "Lady Betty", until her death in Houston, Texas on 20 June 2021. They have three children.

His sister, Rita Laura Kadoorie, is married to fellow Hong Kong billionaire Ronald McAulay.

== See also ==
- Kadoorie family
- List of billionaires

Order of precedence
Preceded by Lo Ka-shui; Recipients of the Gold Bauhinia Star	Hong Kong order of precedence Recipients of the Gold Bauhinia Star	Succeeded by Simon Herbert Mayo; Recipients of the Gold Bauhinia Star
