= Creative education =

Creative education is when students are able to use imagination and critical thinking to create new and meaningful forms of ideas where they can take risks, be independent and flexible. Instead of being taught to reiterate what was learned, students learn to develop their ability to find various solutions to a problem. Coming up with various out-of-the box solutions is known as divergent thinking and there is no one way of cultivating this skill - largely due to the newness of the concept and the limited scientific information on creativity.

== Overview ==
=== Importance ===
The increasing interest in creative education is due to the need for more critical thinkers in business science, politics and every subject to be able to solve complex problems. As the world becomes more interconnected, it is no longer possible to make linear decisions in business and in politics. Current leaders are looking for people who can bring about new ideas to solve pressing issues. For instance, in a 2010 IBM study, Chief Executive Officers from more than 60 countries and 33 different industries worldwide were surveyed on creativity. Those 1,500 CEOs believe that in order for the industries to keep growing in this increasingly complex world, creative strategies must be implemented in education so that these graduating students and future employees are better prepared for massive shifts in industries once they go to workplace. This soft skill of creativity has been identified as a competency for a successful enterprise in the future.

When students have more say in their education, they become more engaged which helps facilitate learning. Plus, the goal of creative education is to challenge each student and encourage originality. Instead of "standardizing" how students approach a problem, different responses would be encouraged. This, in turn, allows more than one type of learner to exist within a classroom.

A growing number of colleges and universities are realizing the needs for more creative students in every field of education. Therefore, they are opening centers, such as Stanford University's d.school, Harvard University's i-lab, Oklahoma State University's Institute for Creativity and Innovation and Ball State University's Center for Creative Inquiry, to increase divergent thinking. Those centers are teaching students creative problem solving and design thinking. Creativity is a set of teachable skills and many universities are requiring students to take creativity classes as part of their undergraduate study.

=== Benefits of Creative Teaching ===
Research has found the following benefits for students using creativity in education:

- Makes learning more fun for students where they can learn faster and can increase their performance
- Students' dislike for science, mathematics, and social studies subjects can be diminished
- Improvement in student achievement

=== Barriers to Creative Teaching ===
- Some teachers may not have the mindset of teaching their students how to be creative
- Some teachers might view creative work as "extra" and not needed
- There is a "creativity gap" in classrooms where creativity is discouraged
- Some studies have found that teachers cannot be creative in classrooms due to pressures by the system, standards, and big classroom size

=== Ways to Increase Creativity in Classroom ===
These are few ways in which creativity in classroom can be increased:

- Don't limit assignments to one format. For example, instead of limiting the student to the writing assignment, they can create a podcast, video, role playing, poem, composing songs, etc.
- Set time aside for creativity. For instance, set aside one hour in a school day to let students explore their ideas
- Use technology to broaden your idea of assignments. For example, you can use Google Maps to teach geography and make the class more interactive.
- Introduce unconventional learning materials into class. Besides using the books in the classrooms, you can use educational podcasts and videos, such as Radiolab and Ted Talks, which can create entertainment with education
- Reward creative ideas, thoughts and products
- Encourage risk-taking, allowing mistakes, and imagining from various perspectives
- And finally, teach teachers to be more creative in classrooms and hold creativity workshops for them

=== Research ===
Early research viewed creativity as an intellectual ability possessed by few people. Creativity has been linked to intelligence. However, today creativity is viewed as a set of teachable skills not linked to intelligence. Some of the research that was done in early 2000, indicated that as people grow older, their creativity dampens. According to the Robinson Report, by the age of 5, a child's potential for creativity is 98%; by the age of 10, this percentage drops to 30%; at age of 15 it is 12%; and by the time we adults, our creativity is no more than 2%.

After two decades, employers and universities realized the need to foster creativity in students and eventually in the workforce.

In Csikszentmihalyi's five-step process to elicit creative thinking, incubation is a necessary step. Meaning, the use of unconscious thought is needed to solve complex problems. A problem such as 2+2 is a linear thought process that can performed in the consciousness. Trying to solve the equation for gravity requires more complex connections in the brain which has been seen to require the unconscious thought process. In application to education, this may include requiring more recess time to facilitate the creative thought process. However, there is limited research on how exactly the creative thought process works and how it can be elicited.

In relevance to education, there is research that emphasizes that students and teachers need more freedom to allow a more creative education process to take place. Students who can participate in their education show more creativity but for this type of education to work, teachers must also have more control over the curriculum. This may look like the teacher determining the curriculum for the entire year or determining how much time each students needs to spend on each subject. Instead of the decision making starting from the top-down (state to schools), the decision making starts from the ground-up (teacher to schools). This isn't suggesting there shouldn't be some national guideline but the idea is to place more trust in the teachers as they are on-the-grounds, engaging with each student.

=== Different methods ===
==== Creative Problem Solving (CPS) ====
The CPS method is a more explicit form of cultivating creativity and uses divergent and convergent thinking skills. Students are asked to brainstorm, plan ahead, and find solutions. Instead of changing an entire curriculum to be creative focused, this method is a more obvious way to teach students how to critically approach assignments.

==== The Torrance Incubation Model (TIM) ====
The Torrance Incubation Model (TIM), developed by Paul E. Torrance is made up of three stages: 1) Heighten Anticipation 2) Deepen Expectations 3) Extend the Learning. This model was created to allow instructors to integrate creativity into their lessons without affecting the subject material. Instead of having to put aside time to teach creativity, teachers can use the TIM model to address the subject and creativity at the same time. The teaching model also aspires to help teachers teach better and to increase interest in students.

==== Analogical Creative Dialogue (DAC) ====
Within Spanish-language educational literature, educator Saturnino de la Torre proposed Diálogo Analógico Creativo (Analogical Creative Dialogue, DAC) as a structured classroom sequence that uses analogy generation, perspective shifting and guided evaluation to turn initial intuitions into applicable proposals in group settings. The procedure has been used in higher education contexts and discussed alongside other creative teaching strategies that combine divergent and convergent phases.

=== Relating Concepts ===
Creative education is sometimes called design education but that may be confused with education pertaining to the design industry (i.e. architecture, graphic design, interior design, etc.).

Design thinking also explains the process of creatively solving problems in all faucets of life. Though this is very similar, creative education focuses on how classes are taught to oppress or encourage creativity.

== Increased prevalence across nations ==
=== Singapore ===
In OECD's PISA global education survey, Singapore was named for having the best education system in 2015. Singapore not only uses technology heavily in their classrooms, but there is emphasis on the idea that the teacher is a facilitator of finding information not the source of information. The argument is that kids are exposed to engaging screens outside of school so expecting them to not use their phones in school makes school boring. By using technology in the classroom, the can use the interest in technology as leverage to maintain student engagement. The technology skills are also more relevant to today's time. Additionally, teachers are encouraged to continually learn and change their teaching strategy by speaking with other instructors and allowing others to weigh-in on their classes - so the teaching method is constantly improving.

=== Finland ===
Finland has also been ranked as hosting one of the top education systems in the world. Not only does the country strive to have accessible education, but teachers usually stay with the same students over several years. The curriculum in Finland starts from the bottom-up so teachers have more control to change the design of the curriculum. This is partly due to the shift in how tests are viewed. Tests are still used as a means of assessing progress but there is no national testing. There has been several intiaitives taken across Finnish schools to bring 4C's - collaboration, creativity and communication as a part of curriculum. Education Finland program aimed to spread Finnish educational know-how outside Finland run by the Finnish National Agency for Education under Ministry of Education, Finland. The key organization members of Education Finland like Council for Creative Education, Finland focuses on developing the Finnish schools centered around creativity across several countries.

=== United Kingdom ===
From the 1960s through the 80's the UK's primary schools were recognized as innovative and surrounding around the child as recorded in the Plowden Report. A noteworthy school in the UK is A.S.'s Summerhill School which is a democratic school where parents, teachers, and students have a say in the education and where the education is designed around the students opposed to kids adapting to a standard school system.

Compared to the European Union, the UK, especially Northern Ireland, have a more frequent usage of creativity across multiple school subjects.

=== United States ===
The education system in the United States has been seen as an inhibitor of creativity. The extensive state-wide tests that are required have push educators to follow strict curriculum so there is less freedom among teachers. The tests also create a cyclical pattern in under-performing, poor schools - low performance leads to less funding. Essentially, money buys the quality of education in the United States.

=== Australia ===
The Ministerial Council on Education, Employment, Training and Youth Affairs (MCEETYA) in Australia has also begun to integrate more creativity within its education model in the Melbourne Declaration on Educational Goals for Young Australians.

== Advocates of creative education ==
=== Ken Robinson ===
Ken Robinson was an academic specializing in the need for creativity in education. He works with governments and education programs to work on creating more innovative education systems. He has a Tedtalk, "Do schools kill creativity?" that gained world recognition and is the most watched TED talk of all time, with 80.3 million views on the TED channel alone, as of 2026.

=== Council for Creative Education (CCE) Finland ===
Council for Creative Education (CCE) Finland is a global organization originating from Tampere, Finland with the motto of redefining education through creativity. Every year, CCE organizes the International Symposium on Creative Education, where in educators, researchers, teachers across the globe meet and contemplate over the advancements and future of creative education.

== Additional resources ==
- Best School Results in Finland - BBC Interview
- Finland Education Model
- Ken Robinson Official Website
- Programme for International Student Assessment (PISA)
- Why Finland's schools are top-notch - CNN Opinion
- Torrance Incubation Model of Teaching and Learning Brief Documentary
