= Yinggeling National Nature Reserve =

Nature reserve in Hainan, China

Coordinates: 19.03964°N 109.52783°E

- Interactive map of Yinggeling National Nature Reserve

The Yinggeling National Nature Reserve is a nature reserve in Hainan, China.

It is located deep between the mountains of Hainan Island and so far scientists have not properly explored it. The Kadoorie Conservation China Department (KCC) conducted a pilot study in 2003 and was stunned by the size of the primary rainforest and its rich biodiversity.

In 2016, two new species of plants were discovered, which were found only in the Yinggeling National Nature Reserve, namely Cladopus yinggelingensis and Terniopsis daoyinensis.

Rhacophorus yinggelingensis, the Yinggeling treefrog, is only known from the Yinggeling National Nature Reserve where it occurs in rainforest at elevations of 1,300 and 1,550 m (4,270 and 5,090 ft).
