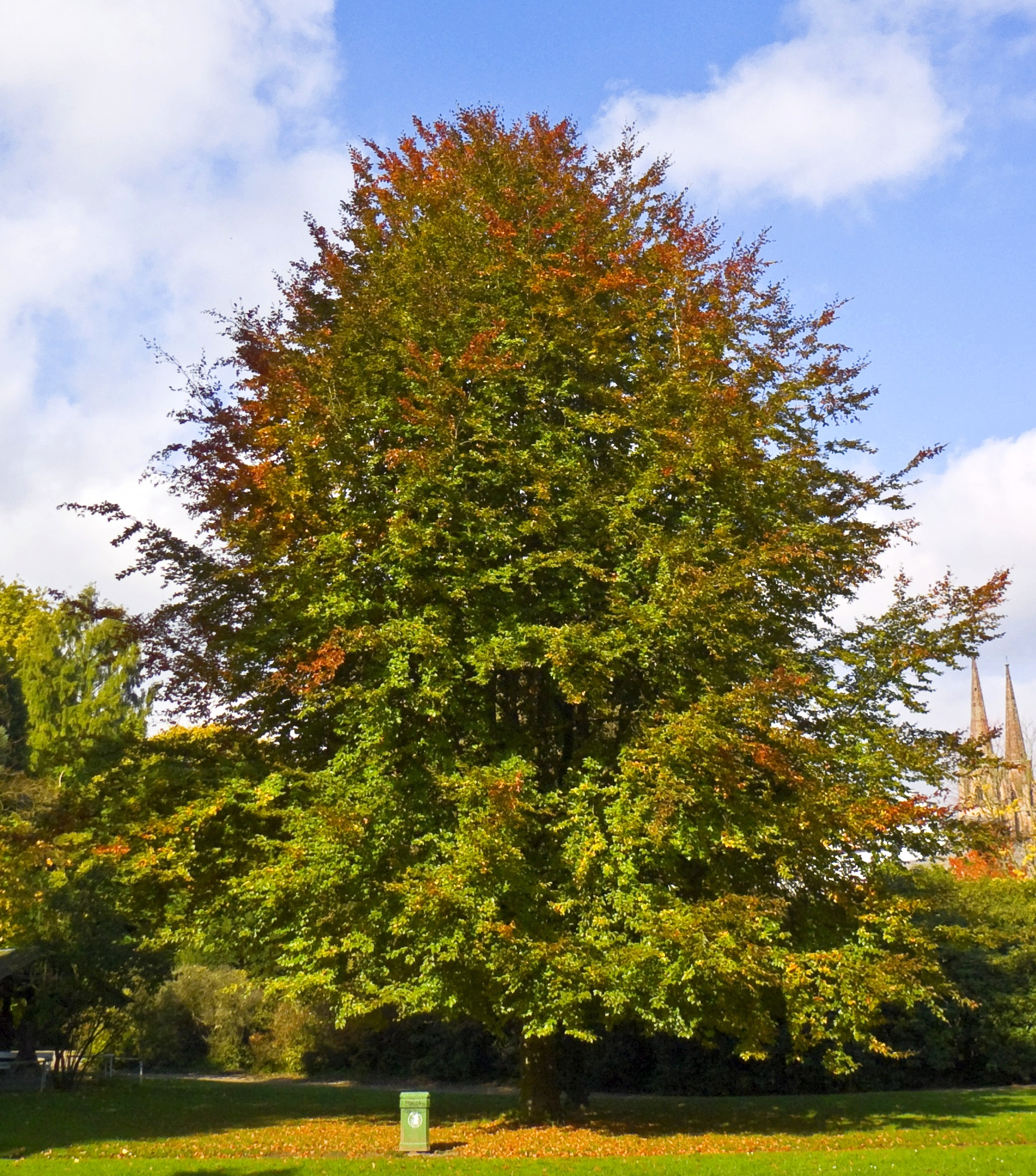
- European beech, Fagus sylvatica

Scientific classification
- Kingdom: Plantae
- Clade: Tracheophytes
- Clade: Angiosperms
- Clade: Eudicots
- Clade: Rosids
- Order: Fagales
- Family: Fagaceae; Dumort.

Type genus
- Fagus L.

Genera
- See text.
- The range of Fagaceae.

Synonyms
- Castaneaceae Brenner; Quercaceae Martinov

= Fagaceae =

Beech / Oak family

Family of flowering plants

The Fagaceae (/fəˈɡeɪsi.iː, -ˌaɪ/; from Latin fagus 'beech tree') are a family of flowering plants that includes beeches, chestnuts and oaks, and comprises eight genera with around 1,000 or more species. Fagaceae in temperate regions are mostly deciduous, whereas in the tropics, many species occur as evergreen trees and shrubs. They are characterized by alternate simple leaves with pinnate venation, unisexual flowers in the form of catkins, and fruit in the form of cup-like (cupule) nuts. Their leaves are often lobed, and both petioles and stipules are generally present. Their fruits lack endosperm and lie in a scaly or spiny husk that may or may not enclose the entire nut, which may consist of one to seven seeds. In the oaks, genus Quercus, the fruit is a non-valved nut (usually containing one seed) called an acorn. The husk of the acorn in most oaks only forms a cup in which the nut sits. Other members of the family have fully enclosed nuts.

Fagaceae is one of the most ecologically important woody plant families in the Northern Hemisphere, as oaks form the backbone of temperate forest in North America, Europe, and Asia, and are one of the most significant sources of wildlife food. Introduced diseases have caused declines in Fagaceae populations. The wood, bark, nuts, and aesthetic value of Fagaceae are also economically valuable. They can contain chemicals such as tannins and antioxidants that have been traditionally used by humans for making medicine and clothing.

== Classification ==
The Fagaceae are often divided into five or six subfamilies and are generally accepted to include 8 (to 10) genera (listed below). Monophyly of the Fagaceae is strongly supported by both morphological (especially fruit morphology) and molecular data.

The Southern Hemisphere genus Nothofagus, commonly called "southern beeches", was historically placed in the Fagaceae as sister to the genus Fagus, but recent molecular evidence suggests otherwise. While Nothofagus shares a number of common characteristics with the Fagaceae, such as cupule fruit structure, it differs significantly in a number of ways, including distinct stipule and pollen morphology, as well as having a different number of chromosomes. The currently accepted view by systematic botanists is that Nothofagus should be placed in its own family, Nothofagaceae.

=== Subfamilies and genera ===
There are two subfamilies:

==== Fagoideae ====
Auth. K. Koch. Monotypic

- Fagus L.—beeches; about 10 to 13 species, north temperate east Asia, southwest Asia, Europe, eastern North America

The genus Nothofagus (southern beeches: from the Southern Hemisphere), formerly included in the Fagaceae, is now treated in the separate monotypic family Nothofagaceae.

==== Quercoideae ====
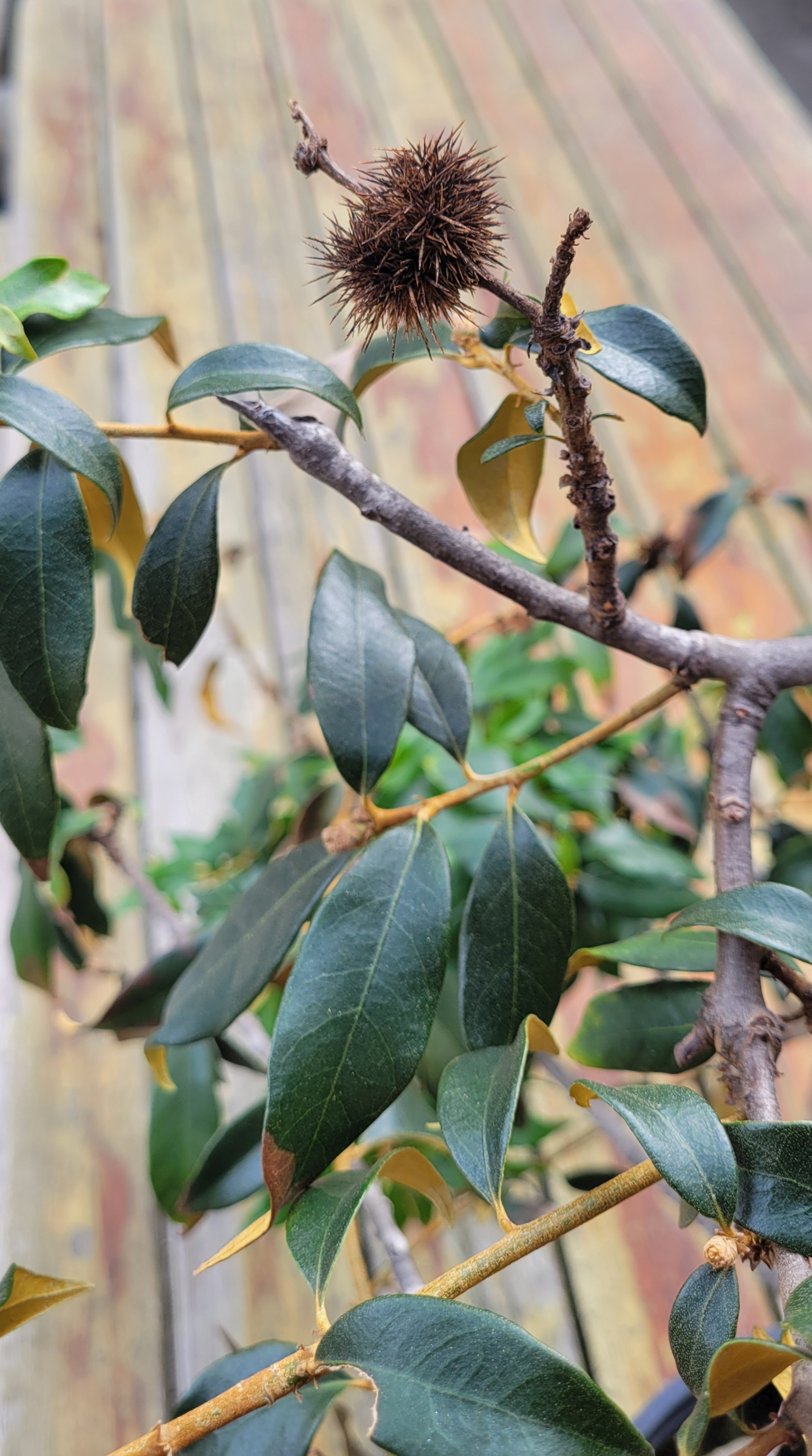
Golden Chinquapin (Chrysolepsis chrysophylla) growing in a pot. Shown are leaves and nuts.

Auth. Õrsted

- Castanea Mill. 1754—chestnuts; eight species, north temperate east Asia, southwest Asia, southeast Europe, eastern North America
- Castanopsis (D. Don) Spach 1841—chinquapins or chinkapins; about 125–130 species, southeast Asia
- Chrysolepis Hjelmq. 1948—golden chinkapins; two species, western United States
- Lithocarpus Blume 1826—stone oaks; about 330–340 species, warm temperate to tropical Asia
- Notholithocarpus P. S. Manos, C. H. Cannon & S.H. Oh 2008 [2009]—Tanoaks; 1 species (formerly Lithocarpus densiflorus), endemic to California and southwest Oregon
- Quercus L. 1753—oaks; about 600 species, widespread Northern Hemisphere, crossing the equator in Indonesia
- Trigonobalanus Forman 1962—three species, tropical southeast Asia, Northern South America (Colombia) (three species of Colombobalanus and Formanodendron are included)

The Quercus subgenus Cyclobalanopsis is treated as a distinct genus in Flora of China, but as a section or subgenus by most taxonomists.

== Distribution ==
The Fagaceae are widely distributed across the Northern Hemisphere. Genus-level diversity is concentrated in Southeast Asia, where most of the extant genera are thought to have evolved before migrating to Europe and North America (via the Bering Land Bridge). Members of the Fagaceae (such as Fagus grandifolia, Castanea dentata and Quercus alba in the Northeastern United States, or Fagus sylvatica, Quercus robur and Q. petraea in Europe) are often ecologically dominant in northern temperate forests. More than 400 species of Fagaceae, mostly Castanopsis and Lithocarpus, grow in Southeast Asia, with some species in similar dominant roles over large areas.

== Ecology ==
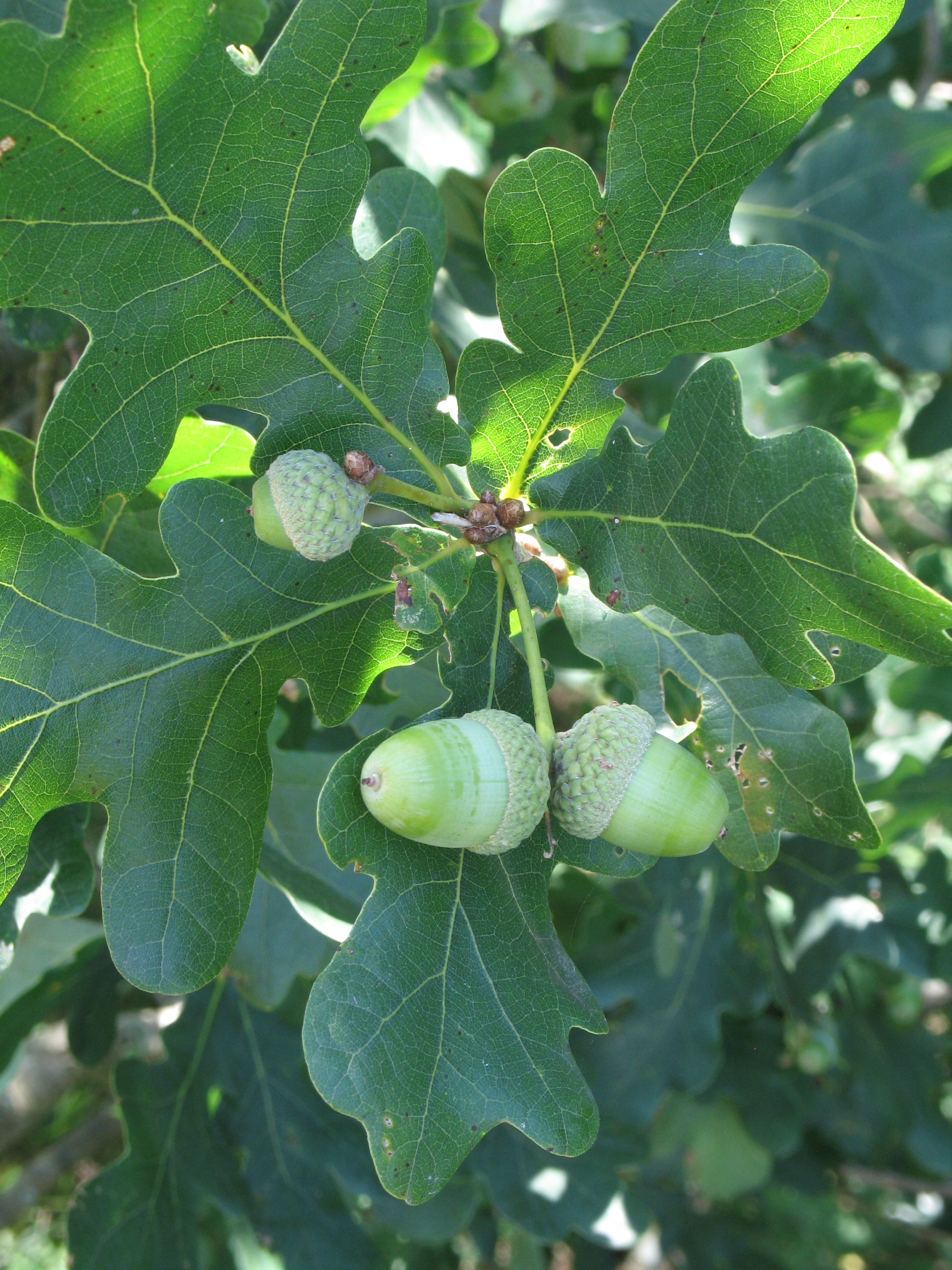
Leaves and acorns of the English Oak (Quercus robur).

Spanning across both hemispheres, Fagaceae is diverse in both temperate and tropical climates. In temperate forests Fagaceae is largely important because they make up many individuals in the ecosystems. Temperate species are often wind pollinated, while tropical trees are often insect pollinated. The acorns produced by oaks are eaten and dispersed by mammals and birds. Dispersers such as mice can also store seeds for later consumption.

Many temperate species in Fagaceae are deciduous, dropping their leaves seasonally to survive cold conditions. Leaf litter decomposes slowly while it deposits nutrients like nitrogen back into the soil. The moist, dark conditions created by leaf litter reduce herb germination and provide habitat for insects, worms, and fungi. Many species in Fagaceae are evergreen, keeping their leaves year round. In China as well as southern Japan and Korea, evergreen Fagaceae species dominate subtropical forests.

Quercus species are known to hybridize where their ranges overlap, but still maintain distinct species.

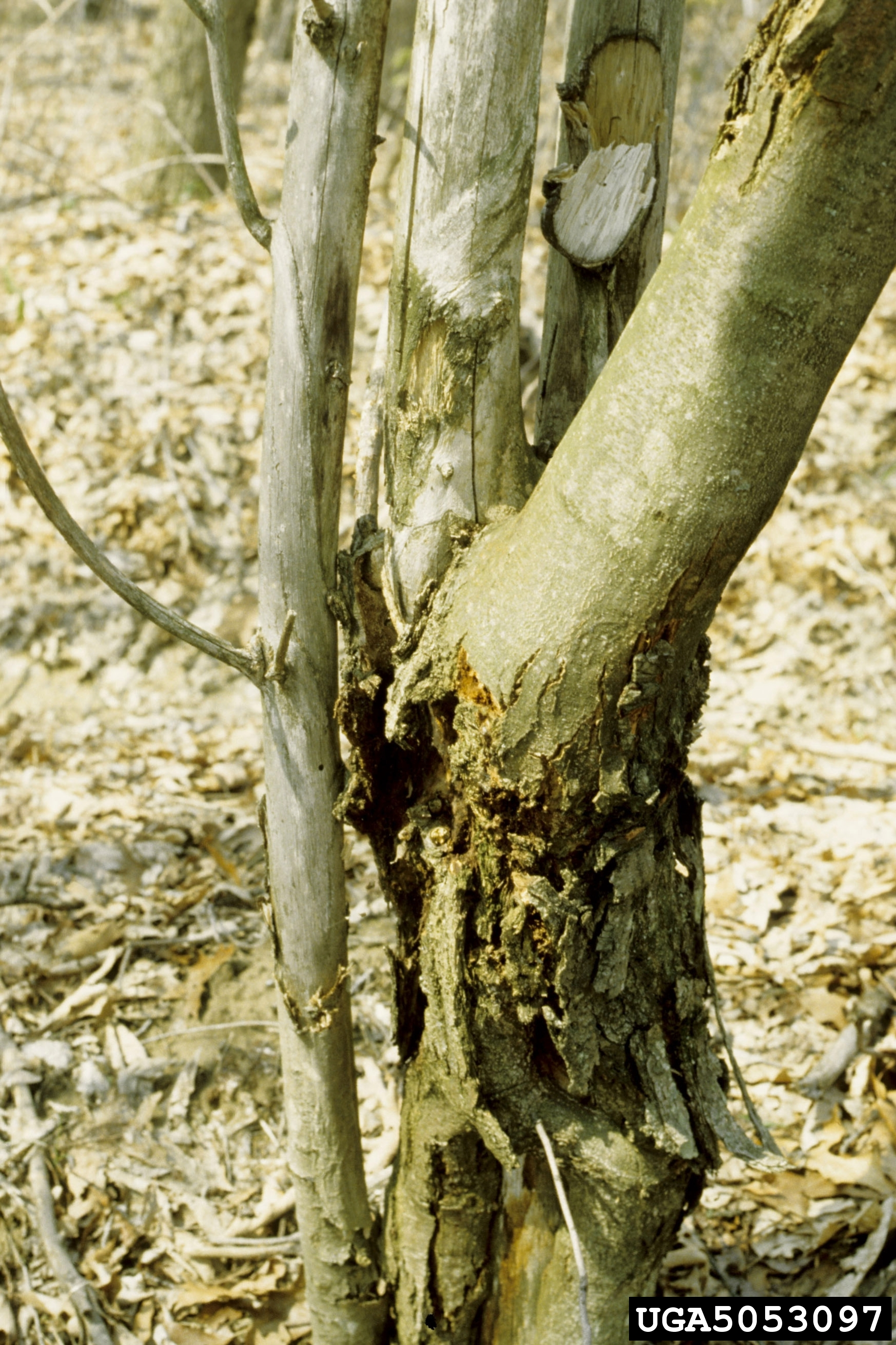
Chestnut blight on a chestnut tree.

=== Changes in ecology ===
In temperate forests, Fagaceae populations in Europe and East Asia are gradually increasing as trees from Pinaceae decrease.

Chestnut species in North America and Europe have experienced population declines due to the introduced disease Chestnut Blight. Chestnut Blight kills the saplings before they can get big enough make flowers or nuts, and are unable to provide the food or habitat they once did. Quercus and Lithocarpus species in North America have also seen population declines due to the disease Sudden Oak Death. The disease was first recorded in the US and Europe in the 1990s. Sudden Oak Death has not been confirmed as the cause of any tree deaths in Europe, but kills trees in its range along coastal California and Oregon.

== Economic uses ==
Several members of the Fagaceae have important economic uses. Many species of oak, chestnut, and beech (genera Quercus, Castanea, and Fagus, respectively) are commonly used as timber for floors, furniture, cabinets, and wine barrels. Cork for stopping wine bottles and a myriad of other uses is made from the bark of cork oak, Quercus suber. Chestnuts are the fruits from species of the genus Castanea. Numerous species from several genera are prominent ornamentals. Wood chips from the genus Fagus are often used in flavoring beers. Nuts of some species in the Asian tropical genera Castanopsis and Lithocarpus are edible and often used as ornamentals.

Oak timber is mostly used in flooring and railroad slats, and the trees are often harvested individually rather than clear-cut. Beech lumber is used for furniture, railroads, charcoal, and more. Chestnut wood has tannins and is used in leather tanning. The hardwood is used for furniture, and lumber can be used for fenceposts, railways, and more. Management strategies for beech timber include the use of thinning to increase growth rate and wood quality.

== Traditional uses ==
Quercus species are used to treat diarrhea, skin conditions, urinary tract infections, and more. Parts of the plant can be dried, decocted, or mixed with food to be ingested or applied. In Bronze Age Europe, Fagus species were used as winter fodder for keeping livestock. Fagus bark contains antioxidants, and native tribes in North America used the trees to treat burns. Uses for Castanea species in the Caucasus include treating joint inflammation, hemorrhoids, and diarrhea. They are also used in dying wool and their tannins in tanning leather. Traditional medicine in Asia uses Castanopsis species for their properties including anti-inflammatory and anti-microbial. The trees contain steroids and essential oils.

== Phylogeny ==
Modern molecular phylogenetics suggest the following relationships:

- Fagales
  - Nothofagaceae (outgroup)
  - Fagaceae
    - Fagoideae
      Fagus
    - Quercoideae
      - Trigonobalanus
      - - - Lithocarpus
          - Chrysolepis
        - - Quercus pro parte
          - - Notholithocarpus
            - - Quercus pro parte
              - - Castanopsis
                - Castanea
